= Mitchell (surname) =

Mitchell or Mitchel is an English, Scottish and Irish surname with three etymological origins. In some cases, the name is derived from the Middle English and Old French (and Norman French) name Michel, a vernacular form of the name Michael. The personal name Michael is ultimately derived from a Hebrew name, meaning "Who is like God?". In other cases, the surname is derived from the Middle English (Saxon and Anglian) words michel, mechel, and muchel, meaning "big". In some cases, the surname was adopted as an equivalent of Mulvihill; this English-language surname is derived from the Irish-language Ó Maoilmhichíl, meaning "descendant of the devotee of St. Michael".

== Geographical distribution ==
As of 2014, 65.5% of all bearers of the surname Mitchell were residents of the United States (frequency 1:759), 12.0% of England (1:639), 5.6% of Australia (1:581), 5.1% of Canada (1:987), 2.8% of Scotland (1:261), 2.4% of South Africa (1:3,154) and 1.3% of Jamaica (1:309).

In Scotland, the frequency of the surname was higher than average (1:261) in the following council areas:

1. Angus (1:159)
2. Dundee (1:161)
3. Aberdeenshire (1:167)
4. Clackmannanshire (1:181)
5. Inverclyde (1:182)
6. Moray (1:189)
7. Fife (1:207)
8. Aberdeen (1:210)
9. Perth and Kinross (1:217)
10. East Ayrshire (1:226)
11. Midlothian (1:240)
12. Scottish Borders (1:241)
13. East Ayrshire (1:242)
14. Falkirk (1:248)
15. North Ayrshire (1:258)

In the United States, the frequency of the surname was higher than average (1:759) in the following states:

1. Alabama (1:360)
2. Mississippi (1:388)
3. Louisiana (1:455)
4. Arkansas (1:460)
5. Georgia (1:501)
6. Tennessee (1:514)
7. Delaware (1:528)
8. North Carolina (1:534)
9. Oklahoma (1:541)
10. South Carolina (1:550)
11. Maine (1:562)
12. Virginia (1:576)
13. Kentucky (1:606)
14. Missouri (1:635)
15. Utah (1:670)
16. Maryland (1:680)
17. Texas (1:680)
18. Kansas (1:688)
19. West Virginia (1:728)
20. Idaho (1:734)
21. Indiana (1:739)
22. Michigan (1:743)
23. Alaska (1:758)

== People ==
=== A ===
- Akil Mitchell (born 1992), American basketball player
- Alan Mitchell (botanist) (1922–1995), British dendrologist and forester
- Alexander Mitchell (disambiguation), multiple people
- Alfred Mitchell (disambiguation), multiple people
- Alvin Mitchell (disambiguation), multiple people
- Andrea Mitchell, American TV journalist
- Andrew Mitchell (born 1956), British politician
- Arthur Mitchell (disambiguation), multiple people
- Austin Mitchell (1934–2021), British politician

=== B ===
- Barbara Mitchell (1929–1977), British actress
- Barry Mitchell (disambiguation), multiple people
- Belle Mitchell (1889–1979), American actress
- Beth Mitchell (1972–1998), American competitive shag dancer
- Betty Mitchell (disambiguation), multiple people
- Beverley Mitchell (born 1981), American actress
- Billy Mitchell (disambiguation), multiple people
- Bo Levi Mitchell (born 1990), American player of Canadian football
- Bobby Mitchell (1935–2020), American football player
- Brian David Mitchell, kidnapper of Elizabeth Smart
- Broadus Mitchell (1892–1988), American historian
- Bruce Mitchell (disambiguation), multiple people
- Bryant Mitchell (born 1992), American football player
- Bryce Mitchell (born 1994), MMA fighter

=== C ===
- Cal Mitchell (born 1999), American baseball player
- Cameron Mitchell (disambiguation), multiple people
- Casey Mitchell (basketball) (born 1988), American basketball player
- Charlene Mitchell (1930–2022), American civil rights activist
- Charles Mitchell (disambiguation), multiple people
- Charlotte Mitchell, British actress
- Christina Mitchell, American politician
- Christopher Mitchell (disambiguation), multiple people
- Chuck Mitchell (1927–1992), American actor
- Claire Mitchell, Scottish lawyer
- Cleta Mitchell (born 1950), American lawyer, politician and activist
- Colin Mitchell (cricketer) (1929–2007), English cricketer
- Colin Campbell Mitchell (1925–1996), British soldier and politician
- Collin Mitchell (born 1969), Canadian curler
- Coulson Norman Mitchell, Canadian recipient of the Victoria Cross

=== D ===
- Dale Mitchell (disambiguation), multiple people
- DaMarcus Mitchell (born 1998), American football player
- Daniel Mitchell (disambiguation), multiple people
- Danyel Mitchell (born 1972), American discus thrower and shot putter
- David Mitchel (c. 1591–1663), Scottish bishop
- David Mitchell (disambiguation), multiple people
- Demetri Mitchell (born 1997), English footballer
- Denis Mitchell (disambiguation), multiple people
- Dennis Mitchell (born 1966), American athlete
- Dennis Mitchell (pilot) (1918–2001), British air force pilot
- Dervilla Mitchell, Irish engineer
- Diana Mitchell (1932–2016), Zimbabwean historian and political activist
- Dickon Mitchell (born 1978), Grenadian Politician
- Dillon Mitchell (gridiron football) (born 1998), American football player
- Donovan Mitchell (born 1996), American basketball player
- Drew Mitchell (born 1984), Australian rugby player

=== E ===
- E. A. Mitchell (1910–1979), American politician
- E. Belle Mitchell (1848–1942), American educator and activist
- E. Coppée Mitchell (1836–1886), American professor
- E. Roger Mitchell (born 1971), American actor
- Eddy Mitchell (born 1942), French singer and actor born Claude Moine
- Edgar Mitchell (1930–2016), American astronaut
- Edith Mitchell (1947–2024), American Brigadier general and oncologist
- Edward Mitchell, multiple people
- Elijah Mitchell (born 1998), American football player
- Elisha Mitchell (1793–1857), American professor
- Elizabeth Mitchell (disambiguation), multiple people
- Eugene Mitchell (1866–1944), American lawyer and politician
- Ewan Mitchell (born 1997), English actor
- Ewing Mitchell (1910–1988), American actor

=== F ===
- Frederick Mitchell (disambiguation), multiple people
- Fondren Mitchell (1921–1952), American football player

=== G ===
- Garrett Mitchell (disambiguation), multiple people
- Gary Mitchell (disambiguation), multiple people
- Gay Mitchell, Irish politician, member of the European Parliament for the Dublin constituency
- Geneva Mitchell (1908–1949), American actress
- George Mitchell (disambiguation), multiple people
- Glenn Mitchell (disambiguation), multiple people
- Guy Mitchell (1927–1999), American singer and actor

=== H ===
- H. Lane Mitchell, American politician
- Hannah Mitchell (1872–1956), English suffragette and socialist
- Harold C. Mitchell (1872–1938), American lawyer and politician
- Henry Mitchell (disambiguation), multiple people
- Howard Hawks Mitchell (1885–1943), American mathematician

=== I ===
- Ian Mitchell (disambiguation), multiple people
- Isaac Mitchell (writer) (1759–1812), New York newspaper publisher and author
- Isaac B. Mitchell (1888–1977), New York state senator

=== J ===
- Jackson Mitchell (born 2001), American football player
- Jacqui Mitchell (born 1936), American bridge player
- James Mitchell (disambiguation), multiple people
- Jamie Mitchell (boxer) (born 1985), professional boxer
- Jane Mitchel (c. 1820–1899), Irish nationalist
- Jane E. Mitchell (1921–2004), African-American nurse
- Jeff Mitchell (disambiguation), multiple people
- Jemma Mitchell (born 1984), British–Australian convicted murderer
- Joan Mitchell (1925–1992), American painter
- John Mitchell (disambiguation), multiple people
- Joni Mitchell (born 1943), Canadian musician and painter
- Joseph Mitchell (disambiguation), multiple people
- Julian Mitchell (born 1935), English screenwriter and occasional novelist
- Juliet Mitchell (born 1940), British psychoanalyst

=== K ===
- Katie Mitchell (born 1964), English theatre director
- Kazuma Mitchell (born 2000), Japanese-American singer, songwriter and model
- Keaton Mitchell (born 2002), American football player
- Keith Mitchell (disambiguation), multiple people
- Kel Mitchell (born 1978), American actor
- Kelsey Mitchell (basketball) (born 1995), American basketball player
- Kenneth Mitchell (disambiguation), multiple people
- Kevin Mitchell (disambiguation), multiple people
- Kim Mitchell (born 1952), Canadian guitarist, solo recording artist and former lead singer for the band Max Webster
- Kris Mitchell (born 2000), American football player

=== L ===
- Latrell Mitchell (born 1997), Australian rugby league footballer
- Lauren Mitchell (born 1992), Australian gymnast, two time Olympic gymnast
- Laurie Mitchell (1928–2018), American actress
- Leilani Mitchell (born 1985), American basketball player
- Leona Mitchell (born 1949), American operatic soprano
- Les Mitchel (1904–1975), American film actor and radio producer, director and actor
- Leslie Mitchell (historian), British historian
- Leslie R. Mitchell (1923–2014), British Scouter and radio amateur
- Letila Mitchell, Rotuman performing artist from Fiji
- Lezmond Mitchell (1981–2020), American criminal
- Loften Mitchell (1919–2001), American playwright
- Lois Mitchell (born 1939), Canadian politician
- Lucy Miller Mitchell (1899–2002), educator and activist
- Lynette Mitchell, professor of Greek history and politics, University of Exeter

=== M ===
- MacNeil Mitchell (1904–1996), New York politician
- Maia Mitchell (born 1993), Australian actress
- Mairin Mitchell (1895–1986), Anglo-Irish author
- Margaret Mitchell (1900–1949), American author (Gone with the Wind)
- Margaret Mitchell (disambiguation), multiple people
- Margaretta Mitchell (born 1935), American photographer and writer
- Maria Mitchell (1818–1889), American astronomer
- Marion Mitchell (disambiguation), multiple people
- Mark Mitchell (disambiguation), multiple people
- Martha Mitchell (director), American television director
- Martha Beall Mitchell, American whistleblower, wife of politician John Mitchell
- Martha Reed Mitchell (1818–1902), American philanthropist and socialite
- Mason Mitchell (born 1994), American stock car racing driver
- Matthew Mitchell (basketball) (born 1970), American basketball coach
- Max Mitchell (born 1999), American football player
- Maybelle Stephens Mitchell (1872–1919), American suffragist
- Melvin Mitchell (born 1953), American football player
- Michael Mitchell (Australian rules footballer) (born 1961), Australian rules footballer
- Michael Mitchell (politician) (died 1699), Anglo-Irish politician
- Michael Bowen Mitchell (born 1945), American lawyer and politician
- Michael C. Mitchell (born 1946), American rural planner
- Michael P. Mitchell (1925–2017), American politician
- Michele Mitchell (diver) (born 1962), American diver and coach
- Michele Mitchell (journalist) (born 1970), American journalist and author
- Michelle Mitchell (born 1972), UK activist
- Mike Mitchell (actor) (born 1982), American comedian and writer
- Mike Mitchell (baseball) (1879–1961), American baseball player
- Mike Mitchell (basketball, born 1956), American basketball player
- Mike Mitchell (basketball, born 1967), American basketball player
- Mike Mitchell (cornerback) (born 1961), American football player
- Mike Mitchell (cricketer) (1843–1905), English cricketer and schoolmaster
- Mike Mitchell (director), American film director
- Mike Mitchell (drummer), Jazz drummer
- Mike Mitchell (musician) (1944–2021), American musician
- Mike Mitchell (Ohio politician), American politician
- Mike Mitchell (safety) (born 1987), American football player
- Mike Kanentakeron Mitchell, Canadian Mohawk politician, filmmaker and lacrosse builder
- Mildred B. Mitchell (1903–1983), American psychologist
- Millard Mitchell (1903–1953), American character actor
- Mitch Mitchell (1946–2008), English drummer
- Mitford Mitchell (1843–1914), Scottish minister
- Myron Mitchell (born 1998), American football player

=== N ===
- Nathan Mitchell (born 1988), Canadian actor
- Noble L. Mitchell (1854–1932), American politician
- Norman Mitchell (1918–2001), British actor
- Norman Mitchell (rugby league), rugby league footballer of the 1950s

=== O ===
- Oliver Mitchell (1917–1942), U.S. Marine killed in action during World War II
- Ormsby M. Mitchel (1810–1862), American Civil War general
- Osirus Mitchell (born 1998), American football player

=== P ===
- Patrick Mitchell (football), British Virgin Islands football manager
- Patrick Mitchell (priest) (1930–2020), English Anglican priest
- Penelope Mitchell, Australian actress
- Peter Mitchell (disambiguation), multiple people
- Priscilla Mitchell (1941–2014), American country music singer
- Pru Mitchell, Australian education librarian and Wikimedian

=== Q ===
- Quinyon Mitchell (born 2001), American football player

=== R ===
- Roma Mitchell (1913–2000), Australian judge
- R. Clayton Mitchell Jr. (1936–2019), American politician
- Radha Mitchell, Australian film actress
- R. J. Mitchell (Reginald Joseph Mitchell, 1895–1937), British aeronautical engineer and designer of the Supermarine Spitfire
- Rhea Mitchell, American film actress
- Richard Mitchell (disambiguation), multiple people
- Robert Byington Mitchell, American Civil War general
- Robin E. Mitchell (born 1946), Fijian sports official and IOC member
- Robert J. Mitchell, geology Professor at Western Washington University
- Rosamond Joscelyne Mitchell (1902–1963), English author, historian, and archivist
- Rosemary Mitchell (1967–2021), English academic Victorianist

=== S ===
- Sam Mitchell (disambiguation), multiple people
- Samuel Mitchell (disambiguation), multiple people
- Saundra Mitchell (born 1973), American novelist
- Scott Mitchell (disambiguation), multiple people
- Seanna Mitchell (born 1988), Canadian freestyle swimmer
- Shannon Mitchell (born 1972), American football player
- Sharon Mitchell (born 1956), American porn actress and director of the Adult Industry Medical Health Care Foundation
- Shay Mitchell (born 1987), Canadian actress and model
- Silas Weir Mitchell (actor) (born 1969), American actor
- Silas Weir Mitchell (physician) (1829–1914), American surgeon
- Stanley Mitchell (1932–2011), British translator, academic, and author
- Stanley Robert Mitchell (1881–1963), Australian metallurgist and ethnologist
- Steven Mitchell (American football) (born 1994), American football player
- Stuart Mitchell (1965–2018), Scottish pianist and composer
- Stuart Mitchell (American football) (born 1964), American football player
- Sydney Mitchell (1856–1930), Scottish architect
- Sydney B. Mitchell (1878–1951), Canadian librarian and horticulturist

=== T ===
- Taylor Mitchell (1990–2009), Canadian singer
- Terence Frederick Mitchell (1919–2007), British linguist
- Tevin Mitchel (born 1992), American football player
- Thomas Mitchell (disambiguation), multiple people
- Tre Mitchell (born 2000), American basketball player
- Ty Mitchell (born 1993), American writer and former actor
- Tyrone Mitchell (1955–1984), American school shooter

=== V ===
- Ve'ondre Mitchell (born circa 2003), American internet celebrity and recording artist
- Victor Mitchell (born 1965), American businessman and politician

=== W ===
- W. O. Mitchell (William Ormond Mitchell, 1914–1998), Canadian writer
- Warren Mitchell (1926–2015), English actor
- Warren Mitchell (basketball), American college basketball coach
- Wendy Mitchell (1932–1999), British nurse, midwife, politician and public servant
- Wesley Clair Mitchell (1874–1948), American economist
- William Mitchell (disambiguation), multiple people
- Willy Mitchell (born 1953), Canadian First Nations musician

=== X ===
- Xavier Mitchell (born 2006), American professional baseball player

=== Z ===
- Zack Mitchell (born 1993), Canadian ice hockey player

== Fictional characters ==
- Amy Mitchell (EastEnders), a fictional character in the British soap opera EastEnders
- Archie Mitchell, a fictional character in the British soap opera EastEnders
- Arthur Mitchell a.k.a. the Trinity Killer, a serial killer in the fourth season of the TV series Dexter
- Ben Mitchell, a fictional character in the British soap opera EastEnders
- Ben Mitchell, from the Australian horror film Wolf Creek
- Billy Mitchell, a fictional character in the British soap opera EastEnders
- Cameron Mitchell, from Stargate SG-1
- Carla Mitchell, a fictional character in the British soap opera EastEnders
- Clive Mitchell, a fictional character in the British soap opera EastEnders
- Courtney Mitchell, a fictional character in the British soap opera EastEnders
- Dana Mitchell, the Pink Ranger in Power Rangers Lightspeed Rescue
- Danny Mitchell, a fictional character in the British soap opera EastEnders
- Dennis the Menace, cartoon character
- Freddie Slater, a fictional character in the British soap opera EastEnders
- Gary Mitchell, villain in the original Star Trek series
- Glenda Mitchell, a fictional character in the British soap opera EastEnders
- Grant Mitchell, a fictional character in the British soap opera EastEnders
- Honey Mitchell, a fictional character in the British soap opera EastEnders
- Jack Mitchell, appears in numerous sketch stories by Henry Lawson
- Jamie Mitchell, a fictional character in the British soap opera EastEnders
- Janet Mitchell, a fictional character in the British soap opera EastEnders
- Jay Brown, a fictional character in the British soap opera EastEnders
- John Mitchell, fictional vampire from the TV series Being Human
- Kate Mitchell, a fictional character in the British soap opera EastEnders
- Kathy Beale, a fictional character in the British soap opera EastEnders
- Kat Slater, a fictional character in the British soap opera EastEnders
- Little Mo Mitchell, a fictional character in the British soap opera EastEnders
- Louise Mitchell, a fictional character in the British soap opera EastEnders
- Madge Mitchell, a fictional character in the British soap opera EastEnders
- Matthew Mitchell Cotton, a fictional character in the British soap opera EastEnders
- The Mitchells family in The Mitchells vs. the Machines
- Nadia Mitchell, a fictional character in the British soap opera EastEnders
- Peggy Mitchell, a fictional character in the British soap opera EastEnders
- Lt. Pete Mitchell ("Maverick"), in Top Gun and Top Gun: Maverick
- Phil Mitchell, a fictional character in the British soap opera EastEnders
- Ricky Branning, a fictional character in the British soap opera EastEnders
- Ronnie Mitchell, a fictional character in the British soap opera EastEnders
- Roxy Mitchell, a fictional character in the British soap opera EastEnders
- Ryan Mitchell, the Titanium Ranger in Power Rangers Lightspeed Rescue
- Sam Mitchell, a fictional character in the British soap opera EastEnders
- Sharon Watts, a fictional character in the British soap opera EastEnders
- Ted Mitchell, a fictional character in the British soap opera EastEnders
- Tiffany Mitchell, a fictional character in the British soap opera EastEnders
- Vi Mitchell, a fictional character in the British soap opera EastEnders
- Wil Mitchell, a fictional character in the British soap opera EastEnders

== See also ==
- Attorney General Mitchell (disambiguation)
- General Mitchell (disambiguation)
- Justice Mitchell (disambiguation)
- Senator Mitchell (disambiguation)
- Mittell, another surname
- Mitchell (given name)
