= Kenny Mitchell (disambiguation) =

Kenny Mitchell is a former US professional boxer.

Kenny Mitchell may also refer to:

- Kenny Mitchell (basketball), US collegiate basketball player in the 1996–97 NCAA Division I men's basketball season
- Kenny Mitchell (footballer), English footballer

== See also ==
- Kenneth Mitchell (disambiguation)
