= Ó Maoilmhichíl =

Irish-origin surname; from the clan of Saint Michael

Ó Maoilmhichíl is an uncommon surname of Irish origin devolving into the common Irish surnames Mitchell and Mulvihill.

The surname Mitchell is derived from the sept or clan name Uí Mhaoilmhichíl which means patrons or devotees of Saint Michael the Archangel.

As the English language began to replace Irish and Scottish Gaelic, the surname was anglicised as Mitchell, Michael, Mulvihill, Mulville, or Melville, and other variations.

A family motto Pro aris et focis originates from the Irish family name "Mulvihill".

== See also ==
- County Sligo
- List of Sligo people
- Mulvihill
- Sligo

== Descendants of the surname Ó Maoilmhichil ==
- Brother Walfrid (born Andrew Kearns), Marist Brothers
- John Francis Mitchell, Vice Chairman, Motorola, Inventor of Cell Phone
- Daráine Mulvihill/Ní Mhaolmhichil, Irish Person of the Year 2001
- William Mulvihill, Author
