= Margaret Mitchell (disambiguation) =

Margaret Mitchell (1900–1949) was an American author.

Margaret Mitchell may also refer to:

== Politics ==
- Margaret Mitchell (Canadian politician) (1925–2017), New Democratic Party Member of Parliament
- Margaret Mitchell (Scottish politician) (born 1952), Scottish Conservative politician

== People ==
- Maggie Mitchell (1832–1918), American actress
- Maggie Mitchell (artist) (1883–1953), British sculptor
- Margaret Mitchell (chief executive), CEO of YWCA USA
- Margaret Mitchell (photographer) (born 1968), Scottish photographer
- Margaret Mitchell (scientist), computer scientist working on fairness in artificial intelligence and machine learning
- Margaret Howell Mitchell (1901–1988), Canadian ornithologist
- Margaret J. Mitchell (1860–1952), American writer and dietician
- Margaret M. Mitchell (born 1956), scholar
- Maggie L. Walker (1867–1934), née Mitchell, Virginia businesswoman and first African American woman banker

== Characters ==
- Madge Bishop, also known as Madge Mitchell
- Peggy Mitchell, fictional EastEnders character
- Margaret Mitchell, fictional character on the Australian soap opera Home and Away

== Other ==
- Margaret Mitchell (Atlanta neighborhood), Buckhead, Atlanta, Georgia
