= Daniel Mitchell =

Daniel Mitchell may refer to:

- Daniel S. Mitchell (1838–1929), American photographer
- Daniel J. Mitchell (born 1958), American economist
- Daniel G. Mitchell, United States Army general
- Danny Mitchell (EastEnders), a fictional character from the BBC soap opera EastEnders
- Danny Mitchell (fighter) (born 1986), MMA fighter
- Danny Ray Mitchell (1943-2013), American politician
- Danny Mitchell (musician), see Modern Man (band)
- Dan Mitchell (musician), early member of American blues rock band ZZ Top
