= Denis Mitchell =

Denis Mitchell or Dennis Mitchell may refer to:

- Dennis Mitchell (scholar), Canadian-American provost of Columbia University
- Denis Mitchell (filmmaker) (1911–1990), British documentary filmmaker
- Denis Mitchell (sculptor) (1912–1993), English abstract sculptor
- Dennis Mitchell (born 1966), American sprinter
- Dennis Mitchell (RAF officer) (1918–2001), British military pilot and commander
- Dennis Mitchell (Dennis the Menace), fictional character
