= Thomas Mitchell =

Thomas or Tom Mitchell may refer to:

== Politics ==
- Thomas Alexander Mitchell (1812–1875), British member of parliament for Bridport
- Thomas B. Mitchell (died 1876), New York politician
- Thomas R. Mitchell (1783–1837), U.S. representative from South Carolina
- Thomas Mitchell (Iowa politician) (1816–1894), Iowa politician
- Tom Mitchell (Australian politician) (1906–1984), Australian politician, author and skier
- Tom Mitchell (Irish politician) (1931–2020), Irish republican

== Sports ==
- Thomas Mitchell (football manager) (1843–1921), manager of Blackburn Rovers and Woolwich Arsenal football clubs
- Thomas Mitchell (Kent cricketer) (1907–1960), English cricketer
- Tom Mitchell (American football) (1944–2017), American football player
- Tom Mitchell (Australian footballer) (born 1993), Australian rules football player
- Tom Mitchell (English footballer) (1899–1984), English footballer and manager
- Tom Mitchell (rugby union, born 1958), Fijian rugby union player
- Tom Mitchell (rugby union, born 1989), English rugby union player, captain of England national rugby sevens team
- Tommy Mitchell (1902–1996), Derbyshire cricketer
- Tommy Mitchell (footballer), (1905–1970), English footballer
- Tom Mitchell (hurdler) (born 1922), American hurdler, 1946 NCAA 100 m hurdles runner-up for the Indiana Hoosiers track and field team

== Other fields ==
- Thomas Mitchell (actor) (1892–1962), American actor
- Thomas Mitchell (explorer) (1792–1855), Scottish explorer of Australia
- Thomas Mitchell (Medal of Honor) (1857–1942), United States Navy sailor and Medal of Honor recipient
- Thomas Mitchell (merchant) (1798–1871), Glasgow merchant and ship owner.
- Thomas Mitchell (painter) (died 1790), English marine painter and naval official
- Thomas Mitchell (scholar) (1783–1845), English classical scholar and translator
- Thomas Noel Mitchell (born 1939), Irish academic
- Thomas W. Mitchell, American law professor
- Thomas Walker Mitchell (1869–1944), British physician and psychical researcher
- Tom M. Mitchell (born 1951), American computer scientist
- Thomas G. Mitchell,American medical mycologist, clinical microbiologist, and academic

== See also ==
- Thomas Michell (died 1551), English MP
