= Alexander Mitchell =

Alexander, Alex, Alec, or Sandy Mitchell may refer to:

== Arts and literature ==
- Alex Mitchell (Australian journalist) (born 1942), Australian political journalist
- Alex Mitchell (British journalist) (1947–2010), British religious journalist
- Alex Stewart (writer) (born 1958), British novelist who writes under the pseudonym Sandy Mitchell

== Law and politics ==
- Alexander Mitchell (Wisconsin politician) (1817–1887), American politician
- Alexander Mitchell (British politician) (1831–1873), British MP
- Alexander C. Mitchell (1860–1911), American politician
- Alexander Mitchell (Saskatchewan politician) (1912–2003), Canadian politician
- Alexander Graham Mitchell (1923–2010), Governor of the Turks and Caicos

== Sports ==
- Alex Mitchell (Australian footballer) (1912–2001), Australian rules footballer
- Alex Mitchell (rugby union) (born 1997), English rugby union player
- Alex Mitchell (English footballer) (born 2001), English footballer

== Others ==
- Alexander Mitchell (engineer) (1780–1868), Irish engineer
- Alexander Ferrier Mitchell (1822–1899), Scottish ecclesiastical historian
- Alexander H. Mitchell (1840–1913), United States military officer
- Alexander Crichton Mitchell (1864–1952), Scottish physicist
- Alec Duncan Mitchell (1888–1963), British chemist
- Sandy Mitchell (prisoner), British prisoner in Saudi Arabia

== See also ==
- Alex Michel (born 1971), American businessman
