= Sister Angelica =

Sister Angelica may refer to:

- Suor Angelica, an opera in one act by Giacomo Puccini
- Sister Angelica (film), a 1954 Spanish drama film
- Sister Angelica, a former ring name of Glenn Ruth, a professional wrestler
