= Mulvihill =

Surname

Mulvihill is a surname. Its Irish form is Ó Maolmhichíl or Ó Maoilmhichil. The motto of the clan is "Pro Aris et Focis", which translates as "For Hearth and Home".

== People ==
- Daráine Mulvihill/Ní Mhaolmhichil, Irish Person of the Year 2001.
- John Mulvihill (politician), Irish Labour Party politician.
- Liam Mulvihill, 17th Director General of the Gaelic Athletic Association.
- Margaret Mulvihill (1954–), Irish writer
- Patricia Mulvihill, colorist who has worked in the comics industry.
- Sarah-Jayne Mulvihill, Flight Lieutenant in the Royal Air Force who died in Iraq.

=== See also ===
- Ó Maoilmhichil
- Mitchell (disambiguation)
