= General Mitchell =

General Mitchell may refer to:

- Billy Mitchell (1879–1936), U.S. Army brigadier general (rescinded), posthumously appointed major general
- Daniel G. Mitchell (fl. 1980s–2020s), U.S. Army major general
- Edith Mitchell (born 1948), U.S. Air Force brigadier general
- Francis Mitchell (British Army officer) (1904–1954), British Army major general
- John Mitchell (born 1785) (1785–1859), British Army major general
- John G. Mitchell (general) (1838–1894), Union Army brigadier general and brevet major general
- Ralph J. Mitchell (1891–1970), U.S. Marine Corps lieutenant general
- Robert Mitchell (congressman) (1778–1848), Ohio Militia brigadier general
- Robert Byington Mitchell (1823–1882), Union Army brigadier general

== See also ==
- Ormsby M. Mitchel (1810–1862), Union Army major general
- Attorney General Mitchell (disambiguation)
