= Lon Pringle =

- Citizenship: American
- Education: Georgia Tech; University of South Carolina
- Scientific career
- Fields: Signal processing Radar
- Workplaces: Georgia Tech Research Institute

Lon N. Pringle is the deputy director for research at the Georgia Tech Research Institute (GTRI). He was the director of GTRI's Signature Technology Laboratory from 2008 to October 2013.

== Education ==
Pringle received a bachelor's degree in electrical engineering from Georgia Tech in 1978, and a PhD in theoretical physics from the University of South Carolina in 1988.

== Career ==
Pringle joined the Georgia Tech Research Institute in 1988 as a graduate student. He became a principal research scientist of the Signature Technology Laboratory in 2000, and the director of the lab in June 2008. There are two patents in his name. In October 2013, he was named GTRI's deputy director for research.
