= Bill Mitchell =

Bill or Billy Mitchell may refer to:

== People ==
=== In arts and entertainment ===
- Bill Mitchell (artistic director) (1951–2017), founder of theatre company Wildworks
- Billy Mitchell (pianist) (born 1943), American jazz pianist
- Billy Mitchell (saxophonist) (1926–2001), American jazz tenor saxophonist
- Billy J. Mitchell (1942–1999), American character actor
- Billy Mitchell, performer with the American rhythm and blues/doo-wop vocal group the Clovers
- Billy Mitchell, performer with the English folk rock and progressive rock band Lindisfarne
- Billy Mitchell, performer with the folk rock/electric folk group Jack the Lad
- Billy Mitchell (EastEnders), a character in the UK TV soap opera EastEnders

=== In sports ===
- Bill Mitchell (Canadian football) (born 1935), former award-winning professional Canadian football centre
- Bill Mitchell (ice hockey) (1930–2014), Canadian professional ice hockey defenceman
- Billy Mitchell (rugby) (1890–1959), New Zealand rugby footballer
- Billy Mitchell (billiards player) (1854–1931), player of English billiards
- Billy Mitchell (footballer, born 1910) (1910–1977), Irish footballer
- Billy Mitchell (footballer, born 2001), English professional footballer

=== In other fields ===
- Bill Mitchell (automobile designer) (1912–1988), American automobile designer
- Bill Mitchell (economist) (born 1952), Australian professor of economics at the University of Newcastle
- Bill Mitchell (politician) (born 1960), Republican member of the Illinois House of Representatives
- Billy Mitchell (1879–1936), United States Army general
- Billy Mitchell (politician) (born 1956), member of the Georgia House of Representatives
- Billy Mitchell (loyalist) (1940–2006), Northern Irish community activist
- Billy Mitchell (gamer) (born 1965), American video game player

== Places ==
- Billy Mitchell (volcano), a volcano in the central part of the island of Bougainville
- Billy Mitchell Airport, a public use airport in Dare County, North Carolina

== See also ==
- William Mitchell (disambiguation)
- Willie Mitchell (disambiguation)
