= William Mitchell =

William Mitchell may refer to:

== People ==
=== Media and the arts ===
- William Mitchell (sculptor) (1925–2020), English sculptor and muralist
- William Frederick Mitchell (1845–1914), British naval artist
- William Mitchell (writer) (1811–1878), English maritime writer
- William M. Mitchell (c. 1826 – c. 1879), American writer, minister and abolitionist
- W. O. Mitchell (1914–1998), Canadian writer
- W. R. Mitchell (William Reginald Mitchell, 1928–2015), British writer
- William Mitchell, former alias of actor Peter Finch
- William Paul Mitchell, known as Large Professor (born 1973), American hip hop producer
- Bill Mitchell (artistic director) (William John Mitchell, 1951–2017), British artistic director of Kneehigh Theatre
- Billy Mitchell (pianist) (William Allen Mitchell, born 1943), American jazz pianist
- Billy Mitchell (saxophonist) (William Melvin Mitchell, 1926–2001), American jazz tenor saxophonist
- Willie Mitchell (musician) (William Lawrence Mitchell, 1928–2010), American trumpeter, bandleader, record producer and arranger

=== Politics and the law ===
- William Mitchell (MP for City of London) (died 1426)
- William Mitchell (1742–1823), member of parliament for Plympton Erle, 1796–1799
- William Mitchell (Australian politician) (1850–1923), member of the Queensland Legislative Assembly
- William Mitchell (advocate) (died 1937), Scottish advocate and Liberal politician
- William Mitchell (Burnley MP) (1838–1914), Conservative MP for Burnley, 1900–1905
- William Mitchell (Canadian politician) (1851–1926), Canadian politician from Quebec
- William Mitchell (Indiana politician) (1807–1865), American politician from Indiana
- William Mitchell (Huntingdonshire MP) (c. 1703–1745), member of parliament for Huntingdonshire, 1741–1745
- William Mitchell (North Dakota politician) (1830–1890), American politician and educator from North Dakota
- William B. Mitchell (1832–1900), American judge from Minnesota
- William D. Mitchell (1874–1955), U.S. attorney general
- William F. Mitchell (Wisconsin politician) (1826–1899), American politician from Wisconsin
- William Foot Mitchell (1859–1947), Conservative Party politician in England, MP 1910 and 1922–1929
- W. Franklin Mitchell, American politician from North Carolina
- William Henry Mitchell (1834–1919), American politician and businessman from Washington
- William Henry Fancourt Mitchell (1811–1884), Australian politician from Victoria
- William O. Mitchell (1846–1930), American politician from Iowa
- William W. Mitchell Sr. (1880–1969), American politician and businessman from Arizona
- Billy Mitchell (politician) (William Weston Mitchell, born 1956), Amerian politician from Georgia
- William Mitchell (judge), Jamaican judge

=== Military ===
- William Mitchell (RAF officer) (1888–1944), senior Royal Air Force commander and Black Rod
- William Mitchell (Royal Navy officer) (c. 1745–1816), Royal Navy admiral
- Billy Mitchell (William Lendrum Mitchell, 1879–1936), American general and airpower advocate

=== Science and engineering ===
- William Mitchell (mathematician), set theorist, see Jónsson cardinal
- William Mitchell (physicist) (1925–2002), Oxford physicist who helped pioneer neutron scattering
- William A. Mitchell (1911–2004), corporate chemist responsible for Tang and Pop Rocks
- Bill Mitchell (automobile designer) (William L. Mitchell, 1912–1988), American automobile designer
- William McGregor Mitchell (1888–1970), Scottish veterinary surgeon

=== Sports ===
- William Mitchell (Canadian football) (born 1959), Canadian football player
- William Mitchell (cricketer, born 1859) (1859–1929), English cricketer
- William Mitchell (soccer), Australian soccer player
- William Grant Mitchell (1865–1905), English international rugby union player
- John Mitchell (cricketer) (William John Mitchell, born 1947), Northern Districts, New Zealand
- Bill Mitchell (cricketer) (William MacFarlane Mitchell, 1929–2005), English cricketer
- Bill Mitchell (ice hockey) (William Richard Mitchell, 1930–2014), Canadian ice hockey defencemen
- Billy Mitchell (footballer, born 1910) (William Mitchell, 1910–1977), Irish footballer
- Billy Mitchell (rugby) (William James Mitchell, 1890–1959), New Zealand rugby player
- Willie Mitchell (baseball) (William Mitchell, 1889–1973), American baseball pitcher
- Willie Mitchell (ice hockey) (William Mitchell, born 1977), Canadian ice hockey player

=== Other ===
- Will Mitchell (1953–2021), business scholar
- Bill Mitchell (economist) (William Francis Mitchell, born 1952), Australian economist
- William J. Mitchell (1944–2010), Australian-born American urban designer and architect
- W. J. T. Mitchell (born 1942), American historian
- William Mitchell (philosopher) (1861–1962), University of Adelaide professor, vice chancellor and chancellor, 1942–1948
- William Mitchell (missionary) (1803–1870), Anglican priest who established religious services in the Swan River Colony
- William Mitchell (Scottish entrepreneur) (1781–1854), co-founder of the Alloa Coal Company
- William Mitchell (moderator) (1670–1727), Scottish minister of the Church of Scotland
- Sir William Wilson Mitchell (1840–1915), British trader and colonial administrator
- Billy Mitchell (gamer) (William James Mitchell Jr., born 1965), American video game player
- Billy Mitchell (loyalist) (William Mitchell, 1940–2006), Northern Ireland loyalist
- William Mitchell, a Black man involved in the 1839 Marion riot

== Characters ==
- President Bill Mitchell, fictional president of the United States in the film Dave
- Will Mitchell, fictional character in the BBC soap opera EastEnders

== Institutions and companies ==
- William Mitchell College of Law, law school named for William B. Mitchell

== See also ==
- Bill Mitchell (disambiguation)
- Billy Mitchell (disambiguation)
- Willie Mitchell (disambiguation)
- Sir William Lane-Mitchell (1861–1940), British Conservative Party politician
- William Michell (1796–1872), MP
