= Bruce Mitchell =

Bruce Mitchell may refer to:

- Bruce Mitchell (American football), American football player
- Bruce Mitchell (cricketer) (1909–1995), South African cricketer
- Bruce Mitchell (drummer) (born 1940), jazz drummer
- Bruce Mitchell (scholar) (1920–2010), Anglo-Saxonist
- Bruce H. Mitchell (born 1948), president and chief executive officer of Canadian company Permian Industries Limited
- Bruce M. Mitchell (1883–1952), American film director and writer
