= Mary Mitchell =

Mary Mitchell may refer to:

- Mary Caroline Mitchell, birth name of Mary Caroline Blair (1848–1912), British Duchess
- Mary Mitchell, 18th-century English victim of abuse
- Mary Mitchell Holloway Wilhite (1831–1892), American physician, first female medical graduate from Indiana
- Mary Mitchell Birchall (1840–1898), American first female recipient of bachelor's degree in New England
- Mary Mitchell Slessor (1848–1915), Scottish Presbyterian missionary to Nigeria
- Mary Mitchell (athlete) (1912–2007), New Zealand track and field champion
- Mary Mitchell (landscape architect) (1923–1988), English co-author of 1988's The Pattern of Landscape
- Mary Mitchell O'Connor (born 1959), Irish Fine Gael politician and cabinet minister
- Mary Mitchell, American columnist for Chicago Sun-Times, writing since 1990s
- Mary Jo Mitchell, American sports journalist since 2000s, a/k/a Mary Jo Perino and Mary Jo Ford
- Maybelle Stephens Mitchell (Mary Isabel Stephens Mitchell; 1872–1919), American suffragist, clubwoman, and activist
- Mary Mitchell Gabriel (1908–2004), American basketmaker

== Other ==
- Mary B Mitchell (schooner), British and Irish schooner, launched 1892
- Mary B Mitchell (Q-ship), First World War service of above schooner

== See also ==
- Marion Mitchell (disambiguation)
