= Páraic Duffy =

Director General of the GAA (2008–2018)

Director-General of the Gaelic Athletic Association
- In office February 2008 – April 2018
- Preceded by: Liam Mulvihill
- Succeeded by: Tom Ryan

Personal details
- Born: 1 January 1951 (age 75) Castleblaney, County Monaghan, Ireland
- Spouse: Vera Duffy (m. 1976)
- Children: Mark, Paul, Úna
- Occupation: Secondary School Principal

Páraic Duffy (born 1 January 1951) is an Irish former gaelic football player who served as the 18th director general of the Gaelic Athletic Association from 2008 until 2018. Prior to that, he was also the first lay principal of St Macartan's College in County Monaghan.

== Early life ==
Born and raised in Castleblaney, Duffy attended primary school at the local St Mary’s Boys School, before continuing his education in St Macartan’s College in Monaghan Town. Duffy first gained an interest in gaelic games from his father (who was involved in the GAA locally) and attended his first All Ireland in 1958, where Dublin beat Derry to lift The Sam Maguire. Duffy also gained an interest in English soccer after the FA Cup began broadcasting on television, and became a lifelong fan of Tottenham Hotspur F.C.

After leaving school, Duffy studied history at University College Dublin, and then attended NUI Maynooth to be awarded a H-Dip. On graduation, Duffy returned to St Macartan’s College to become a teacher. Duffy would also later obtain a master's degree in educational management from the University of Ulster. In 1996, Duffy was promoted to school principal of St Macartan's College, thus becoming the first lay principal of that Catholic college.

== GAA career ==
=== Playing career ===
Duffy first played as a Gaelic footballer with his local club the Castleblayney Faughs, with whom he won the Under 16 and minor County Championship in 1968. Duffy also played minor football for the Monaghan county football team, before retiring from the game in his mid-20s to focus on the administrative aspects of the GAA.

=== Local Administrative Roles ===
Duffy was appointed as assistant secretary of the Monaghan county board in the early 1970's, where he worked alongside Seán McCague to improve the standard of the player's performances. A novel technique Duffy pioneered was the filming of matches and then holding video analysis sessions with the team afterwards, with the intent to identify the causes of performance drops. As a result of their steady improvements, Monaghan won the Ulster Senior Football Championship for the first time in 41 years when they defeated Donegal in 1979, with the team winning again in 1985 and 1988.

In 1982, Duffy was elected unopposed to be chairman of the Monaghan County Board, where he continued to introduce change and attempt to modernise aspects of the local organization. Duffy was also one of the selectors of the Monaghan senior county side between 1983 and 1987. Duffy began to step back from county level activities in the early 1990s to focus instead on juvenile and school aged players, coaching teams in both Scotstown and Emyvale as well as various teams from St Macartan's College.

=== National Administrative Roles ===
In 2000, Seán McCague became President of the Gaelic Athletic Association, and invited Duffy to become chairman of the Games Administration Committee, a role he held until 2003. Duffy then moved onto the Coaching and Games Development Committee between 2003 and 2006. Duffy was then In 2006, Duffy was then appointed as chairman of the National Audit Committee Duffy left his role as Principle of St Macartan's College to become the GAA's player welfare officer in 2006.

=== Director General of the GAA ===
In February 2008, Duffy became the director general of the GAA, replacing Liam Mulvihill after his 29-year tenure in the role.

==== Changes to Revenue Raising ====
Duffy worked hard to raise revenues for the GAA, with the €60 million total recorded in 2016 being over double the amount received by the organization in 2006. One of the more controversial decisions of Duffy's tenure was the broadcasting deal the GAA signed with Sky Sports in 2014, which entailed a number of live senior All-Ireland Championship matches being exclusively aired on its satellite TV subscription service. Although the GAA had previously agreed a broadcasting deal with Setanta Sports to show league matches, the Sky Sports deal entailed some Championship games being unavailable on terrestrial TV for the first time in the GAA's history.

Duffy defended the decision in media interviews, pointing out that the Gaelic Athletic Association Congress voted against restricting the TV rights to free-to-air broadcasters at its 2016 annual conference, adding that simple economics dictated that denying access to interested parties would seriously undermine the GAA's negotiating power with the remaining parties in any broadcasting rights auction. Duffy also asserted that all commercialization decisions were taken to increase financial revenues for the GAA, the vast majority of which were then invested in coaching costs and capital expenditure on stadium infrastructure and local gaelic grounds. He also predicted that the naming rights to Croke Park would never be sold by the GAA.

==== Changes to GAA Rules ====
In another major change, Duffy was instrumental in introducing the "Black Card" to gaelic games in 2014 to help combat unsportsmanlike behaviour, where players deemed to be committing cynical minor fouls to prevent an opponent from performing would be sent off the pitch for 10 minutes, similar to the sin bin used in rugby. Although the new rule was sometimes unpopular, in 2017 Duffy defended its implementation by pointing out that statistics showed that the number of goals per game had increased by 25% and the number of points per game had risen by over 8% since its introduction.

Duffy also helped to make significant changes to the manner in which quarter finals would be played from the 2018 All-Ireland Senior Football Championship onwards (informally known as the 'Super 8' system), where instead of the traditional knockout matches determining who would advance the teams would compete in a miniature round-robin tournament.

==== Notable Events ====
Some of the notable events Duffy presided over during his 10-year stint included the International Rules Series in Croke Park, hosting Queen Elizabeth II during her 2011 state visit, and meeting with foreign dignitaries such as Barack Obama and Xi Jinping.

==== Retirement from Director General role ====
In April 2018, Duffy was succeeded as director general by Tom Ryan. After stepping down, Duffy then took on the role of a selector for the Scotstown senior GAA team.

Preceded by Liam Mulvihill	GAA Director General; 2008–2018	Succeeded by Tom Ryan
