= Alfred Mitchell =

Alfred or Alf Mitchell may refer to:

- Alfred James Mitchell (1853–1928), English-born New Zealand police superintendent
- Alfred Mansfield Mitchell (1853–1936), Irish Anglican priest and activist
- Alfred R. Mitchell (1888–1972), American landscape painter
- Norval Mitchell (Alfred Norval Mitchell, 1906–1988), British civil servant and political officer in India
- Alf Mitchell (rugby league) (1910–1974), New Zealand rugby league player
- Alf Mitchell (javelin thrower) (born 1941), Australian javelin thrower
- Finesse Mitchell (Alfred Langston Mitchell, born 1972), American actor and comedian

== See also ==
- Samuel Alfred Mitchell (1874–1960), Canadian-American astronomer
- Alfred Mitchell-Innes (1864–1950), British diplomat and economist
- Edward Alfred Mitchell-Innes (1863–1932), British barrister
