= Elizabeth Mitchell (disambiguation) =

Elizabeth Mitchell (born 1970) is an American actress.

Elizabeth Mitchell may also refer to:

- Elizabeth Harcourt Mitchell (1833–1910), British writer
- Elizabeth Mitchell (fencer) (1919–1998), New Zealand fencer
- Libby Mitchell (born 1940), American politician
- Elizabeth Mitchell (musician) (born 1968), American singer
- J. Elizabeth Mitchell (born 1969), American politician, daughter of the last-named
- Beth Mitchell (1972–1998), American shag dancer
- Birth name of American actress Elizabeth Banks (born 1974)

== See also ==
- Liz Mitchell (born 1952), Jamaican singer from disco group Boney M.
- Betsy Mitchell (born 1966), swimmer
- Betty Mitchell (disambiguation)
