= Mark Mitchell =

Mark or Marc Mitchell may refer to:

== Sports ==
- Mark Mitchell (American figure skater) (born 1968), American retired competitive figure skater
- Marc Mitchell (basketball) in 2008 McDonald's All-American Boys Game
- Mark Mitchell (basketball) (born 2003), American college basketball player
- Mark Mitchell (Canadian figure skater), Canadian ice dancer
- Marc Mitchell (Canadian football), in 2004 CFL draft, Canadian player of Canadian football
- Mark Mitchell (footballer) (born 1951), Australian footballer in Australian-rules football
- Marc Mitchell (racing driver) (born 1983), American stock car racing driver
- Mark Mitchell (speed skater) (born 1961), American Olympic speed skater

== Others ==
- Mark Mitchell (actor) (born 1954), Australian actor and comedian
- Mark Mitchell (musician), former bass guitarist for American metal bands Throwdown, Culture and Until the End
- Mark Mitchell (New Zealand politician) (born 1968), New Zealand MP
- Mark Mitchell (researcher), director of the Applied Concepts Laboratory at Georgia Tech Research Institute
- Mark Mitchell (Vermont politician) (1934–2011), American architect and politician
- Mark E. Mitchell (born 1965), United States Army officer and Distinguished Service Cross recipient
- Marc Mitchell, see Tales from the Engine Room
