= Judge Mitchell =

Judge Mitchell may refer to:

- George J. Mitchell (born 1933), judge of the United States District Court for the District of Maine
- Lansing Leroy Mitchell (1914–2001), judge of the United States District Court for the Eastern District of Louisiana
- Samuel James Mitchell (1852–1926), in South Australia
- Suzanne Mitchell (born 1968), magistrate judge of the United States District Court for the Western District of Oklahoma

== See also ==
- Justice Mitchell (disambiguation)
