= Princeville, Illinois =

Princeville
- Village
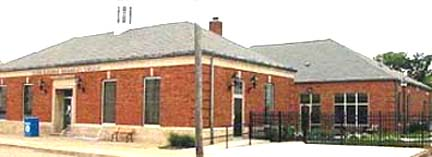
- Lillie M. Evans Library, Princeville

- Flag Logo
- Motto: The Village With A Vision
- Location of Princeville in Peoria County, Illinois.
- Coordinates: 40°56′09″N 89°45′08″W
- Country: United States
- State: Illinois
- County: Peoria
- Founded: 1837

Government
  - Village President: Jeff Troutman

Area
  - Total: 1.69 sq mi (4.39 km^{2})
  - Land: 1.69 sq mi (4.39 km^{2})
  - Water: 0 sq mi (0.00 km^{2})
- Elevation: 735 ft (224 m)

Population (2020)
  - Total: 1,728
  - Estimate (2024): 1,719
  - Density: 965.6/sq mi (372.81/km^{2})
- Time zone: UTC-6 (CST)
  - Summer (DST): UTC-5 (CDT)
- ZIP code: 61559
- Area code: 309
- FIPS code: 17-61925
- GNIS feature ID: 2399025
- Website: princeville.org

Princeville is a village in Peoria County, Illinois, United States. The population was 1,728 at the 2020 census, down from 1,738 in 2010. It is part of the Peoria, Illinois Metropolitan Statistical Area.

== Geography ==
According to the 2010 census, Princeville has a total area of 1.66 square miles (4.30 km^{2}), all land.

=== Climate ===
Climate data for Princeville, Illinois (1991–2020)
Month	Jan	Feb	Mar	Apr	May	Jun	Jul	Aug	Sep	Oct	Nov	Dec	Year
Mean daily maximum °F (°C)	32.5 (0.3)	37.4 (3.0)	50.2 (10.1)	63.5 (17.5)	74.5 (23.6)	82.9 (28.3)	85.6 (29.8)	83.8 (28.8)	78.2 (25.7)	65.4 (18.6)	50.7 (10.4)	37.4 (3.0)	61.8 (16.6)
Daily mean °F (°C)	23.5 (−4.7)	27.8 (−2.3)	39.1 (3.9)	51.0 (10.6)	62.5 (16.9)	71.7 (22.1)	74.4 (23.6)	72.3 (22.4)	65.2 (18.4)	53.1 (11.7)	40.4 (4.7)	28.6 (−1.9)	50.8 (10.5)
Mean daily minimum °F (°C)	14.5 (−9.7)	18.2 (−7.7)	28.0 (−2.2)	38.5 (3.6)	50.6 (10.3)	60.5 (15.8)	63.1 (17.3)	60.8 (16.0)	52.1 (11.2)	40.9 (4.9)	30.1 (−1.1)	19.9 (−6.7)	39.8 (4.3)
Average precipitation inches (mm)	2.18 (55)	1.90 (48)	2.42 (61)	3.67 (93)	5.05 (128)	4.00 (102)	4.48 (114)	3.70 (94)	3.86 (98)	3.11 (79)	2.40 (61)	2.05 (52)	38.82 (985)
Average snowfall inches (cm)	5.4 (14)	5.5 (14)	2.0 (5.1)	0.1 (0.25)	0.0 (0.0)	0.0 (0.0)	0.0 (0.0)	0.0 (0.0)	0.0 (0.0)	0.0 (0.0)	0.9 (2.3)	6.4 (16)	20.3 (51.65)
Source: NOAA

== Demographics ==
Historical population
Census	Pop.	Note	%±
1860	263		—
1870	424		61.2%
1880	509		20.0%
1890	641		25.9%
1900	848		32.3%
1910	982		15.8%
1920	1,035		5.4%
1930	994		−4.0%
1940	996		0.2%
1950	1,113		11.7%
1960	1,281		15.1%
1970	1,455		13.6%
1980	1,712		17.7%
1990	1,421		−17.0%
2000	1,621		14.1%
2010	1,738		7.2%
2020	1,636		−5.9%
U.S. Decennial Census

=== 2020 census ===
As of the 2020 census, Princeville had a population of 1,636. The median age was 40.2 years. 25.3% of residents were under the age of 18 and 21.6% of residents were 65 years of age or older. For every 100 females there were 95.2 males, and for every 100 females age 18 and over there were 85.2 males age 18 and over.

0.0% of residents lived in urban areas, while 100.0% lived in rural areas.

There were 648 households in Princeville, of which 33.8% had children under the age of 18 living in them. Of all households, 50.3% were married-couple households, 15.1% were households with a male householder and no spouse or partner present, and 30.7% were households with a female householder and no spouse or partner present. About 29.3% of all households were made up of individuals and 16.0% had someone living alone who was 65 years of age or older.

There were 728 housing units, of which 11.0% were vacant. The homeowner vacancy rate was 3.7% and the rental vacancy rate was 19.2%.

Racial composition as of the 2020 census
Race	Number	Percent
White	1,466	89.6%
Black or African American	12	0.7%
American Indian and Alaska Native	3	0.2%
Asian	7	0.4%
Native Hawaiian and Other Pacific Islander	0	0.0%
Some other race	51	3.1%
Two or more races	97	5.9%
Hispanic or Latino (of any race)	107	6.5%

=== 2000 census ===
As of the census of 2000, there were 1,621 people, 659 households, and 452 families residing in the village. The population density was 1,239.4 inhabitants per square mile (478.5/km^{2}). There were 748 housing units at an average density of 571.9 per square mile (220.8/km^{2}). The racial makeup of the village was 97.59% White, 0.31% Native American, 0.12% Asian, 1.30% from other races, and 0.68% from two or more races. Hispanic or Latino of any race were 2.71% of the population.

There were 659 households, out of which 33.1% had children under the age of 18 living with them, 56.4% were married couples living together, 10.0% had a female householder with no husband present, and 31.3% were non-families. 28.2% of all households were made up of individuals, and 13.2% had someone living alone who was 65 years of age or older. The average household size was 2.46 and the average family size was 3.02.

In the village, the population was spread out, with 26.5% under the age of 18, 7.3% from 18 to 24, 27.5% from 25 to 44, 21.5% from 45 to 64, and 17.3% who were 65 years of age or older. The median age was 37 years. For every 100 females, there were 92.7 males. For every 100 females age 18 and over, there were 89.8 males.

The median income for a household in the village was $40,060, and the median income for a family was $49,118. Males had a median income of $31,957 versus $22,727 for females. The per capita income for the village was $19,137. About 6.7% of families and 6.7% of the population were below the poverty line, including 8.2% of those under age 18 and 3.3% of those age 65 or over.

== Notable people ==
- Daniel G. Mitchell, Commanding General of the United States Army Sustainment Command
- Emmett Seery, outfielder for several Major League Baseball teams (1884–1892)

== Transportation ==
SR 90 in Princeville runs East and West through Princeville. SR 91 shares with SR 90 until it reaches Santa Fe Ave in Princeville. Those highways are all two lane highways.

== Schools ==
Princeville is District 326. They have 17 buses for students. It is a district with Princeville Junior/Senior High School, and Princeville Grade School. Princeville is a small community school district.

- Princeville Elementary School Grades K-5
- Princeville Junior/Senior High School Grades 6-12
