= Barry Mitchell =

Barry Mitchell may refer to:

- Barrie Mitchell (1947–2021), Scottish footballer
- Barry Mitchell (comedian) (born 1952), American television personality
- Barry Mitchell (basketball) (1965–2025), American professional basketball player
- Barry Mitchell (footballer) (born 1965), former Australian rules footballer
- Barry Mitchell, mathematician, see Mitchell's embedding theorem

== See also ==
- Mitchell (surname)
