= Senator Michel =

Senator Michel may refer to:

- Geoff Michel (born 1963), Minnesota State Senate
- J. Walter Michel (born 1960), Mississippi State Senate

== See also ==
- Senator Mitchell (disambiguation)
