= Scott Mitchell =

Scott Mitchell may refer to:

== Sports ==
=== Gridiron football ===
- Scott Mitchell (offensive lineman) (born 1989), Canadian football player in the Canadian Football League
- Scott Mitchell (quarterback) (born 1968), American football quarterback
- Scott Mitchell (wide receiver) (born 1983), American football wide receiver in the Arena Football League and Canadian Football League

=== Other sports ===
- Scott Mitchell (darts player) (born 1970)
- Scott Mitchell (footballer) (born 1985)
- Scott Mitchell (curler) (born 2001)

== Others ==
- Scott A. Mitchell, researcher of applied mathematics
- Scott Mitchell (architect) (born 1971)
- Scott Mitchell (Buddhist scholar)
- Scott Mitchell (journalist), co-founder of Lamesteam media with Osman Faruqi
- Captain Scott Mitchell, a fictional character in the Tom Clancy's Ghost Recon video game series
