= Kenneth Mitchell =

Kenneth Mitchell may refer to:

- Kenneth Mitchell (actor) (1974–2024), Canadian actor
- Kenneth Mitchell (politician) (born 1965), New York City Council member
- Kenneth Mitchell (cricketer) (1924–1986), English cricketer
- Ken Mitchell (1940–2026), Canadian poet, novelist and playwright
- Ken Mitchell (American football) (born 1948), American football player
- Kenny Mitchell (born 1960), American boxer
- Kenny Mitchell (footballer) (1957–2019), English footballer
- Ken Mitchell (cyclist) (born 1930), British cyclist
