= Marion Mitchell =

Marian or Marion Mitchell may refer to:

- Marion Mitchell (born 1941), English pop singer, stage name Janie Jones
- Marion Mitchell (singer) (1876–1955), New Zealand civic and charitable organiser
- Marion Mitchell, Spanish film actress during 1950s (1954's Sister Angelica)
- Marion Bonner Mitchell (1926–2014), American literary historian
- Marian Houghton Mitchell (1895–1986), Anglo-Irish author, pen name Mairin Mitchell
- Marion Juliet Mitchell (1836–1917), American poet and educator

== See also ==
- Mary Mitchell (disambiguation)
