= Joseph Mitchell =

Joseph or Joe Mitchell may refer to:

- Joseph Mitchell (city manager) (1922–1993), Newburgh, New York, city manager
- Joseph Mitchell, director of OzAsia festival in Adelaide, Australia, until 2019
- Joseph Mitchell (engineer) (1803–1883), Scottish civil engineer
- Joseph Mitchell (Indiana judge) (1837–1890), Associate Justice of the Supreme Court of Indiana
- Joseph Mitchell (Medal of Honor) (1876–1925), United States Navy sailor
- Joseph Mitchell (Mitchell Estate director) (1935–2011), director of Margaret Mitchell's estate
- Joseph Mitchell, New York City architect, see St. Benedict the Moor's Church (New York City)
- Joseph C. Mitchell (born 1948), American politician
- Joseph Mitchell (politician) (1840–1897), New South Wales politician and businessman
- Joseph Mitchell (writer) (1908–1996), American writer
- Joseph B. Mitchell (1915–1993), American military historian
- Vic Mitchell (Joseph Charles Victor Mitchell, 1934–2021), railway publisher and author
- Joseph S. B. Mitchell (fl. 1980s–2010s), American computer scientist
- Joe Mitchell (baseball) (fl. 1930s), American baseball player
- Joe Mitchell (footballer) (1886–1964), English footballer
- Joe Mitchell (politician) (born 1997), member of the Iowa House of Representatives
