= Jan Frans Vonck =

Belgian politician and leader of the Brabant Revolution

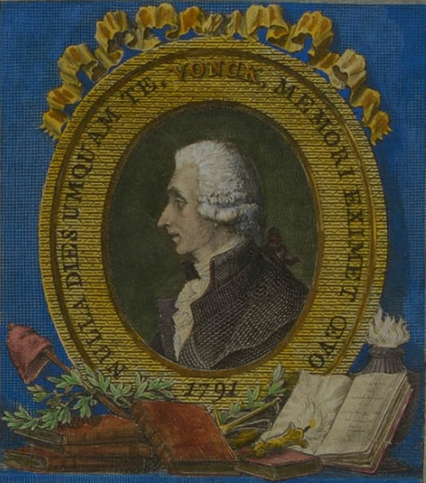
- Jan Frans Vonck (1791)
- Born: 29 November 1743; Baardegem, Flanders, Austrian Netherlands
- Died: 1 December 1792 (aged 49); Lille, Flanders and Hainaut, French Republic
- Occupation: Lawyer
- Political party: Vonckist

Johannes Franciscus Vonck, also known by the Francization Jean-François Vonck or the Netherlandization Jan-Frans Vonck, (29 November 1743 – 1 December 1792) was a lawyer and one of the leaders of the Brabant Revolution from 1789 to 1790. This Revolution led to the founding of the United States of Belgium in January 1790. Vonck was the leader of the radical Vonckists faction of revolutionaries which were named after him. They were inspired by the French Revolution, pleaded for the abolition of the feudal government of the state based on privileges and were in favour of a more centralised government.

== Childhood ==
Jan Frans Vonck was born in Baardegem, the son of a well-to-do farming couple, Jan Vonck and Elisabeth van Nuffel. He had a brother who later became priest, Benedictus Hieronymus, and three sisters: Maria Anna Josepha, Anna Margaretha and Maria Theresia. Vonck studied humanities at the Jesuit college in Brussels. Afterwards, he attended the gymnasium in Geel. From 24 January 1763 onwards, he studied law in Leuven at the college "De Valk", ("The Falcon"). After graduating, began his successful career as a lawyer.

== Brabant Revolution ==
During the Brabant Revolution, Vonck initially cooperated with Hendrik van der Noot and his faction of the Statists. In the course of the Revolution, Hendrik van der Noot became Voncks’ opponent as Van der Noot strived for the restoration of old privileges such as the "Joyous Entry", the "Blijde Inkomst". Vonck, influenced by developments in France on the other hand, aimed for less privileges. He pleaded for more democracy, and separation between legislative, executive and judicial powers. Vonck formulated his ideas in the Considérations impartiales sur l'état actuel du Brabant ("Impartial considerations on the current state of Brabant"), which appeared in January 1790. Vonck aimed to reform the existing structures rather than an Assemblée nationale as established by the French Revolution. Vonck wanted to extend the representation of the three social classes in the States General: clergy, nobility and the bourgeoisie. The clergy had to increase in number with secular representatives and the nobility also had to increase in number. According to Vonck, the representation of the third class, the bourgeoisie, who consisted of patricians, had to be extended to the higher middle class. Van der Noot wanted to preserve the privileges of the nobility and the Catholic church. He considered Vonck to be a danger and started to pursue him as he did with other opponents. The Vonck's house was looted and on 17 March 1790, he had to go into hiding in Brussels. Together with some comrades, Vonck had to flee to France, where he eventually arrived in Lille. Meanwhile, Vonck got a passport under the name of Van Nuffel, the name of his mother. There he translated his earlier Considérations into Dutch with the title Onzeydige Aenmerkingen over den tegenwoordige ghesteltenis van Brabant ("Impartial testament on the present situation of Brabant") and he added to it a Kort historisch verhael tot inleyding uytgegeven door den advocaat Vonck ("Short historical introductory story issued by the lawyer Vonck"). Shortly afterwards, he died in the city of Lille.

== Vonck’s nightcap ==
Vonck was buried in the village of Baardegem near Aalst where he was born. His resting place was rediscovered in 1923, when a gravedigger discovered a lead coffin. In the coffin, he found Vonck's skeleton, his wig and a well kept nightcap. That nightcap is nowadays preserved in the municipal archives and a monument now stands on his tomb. He bequeathed to the poor of the municipality among others and gave orders for a scholarship to be founded which still exists and which is managed by the provincial administration of East Flanders. His supporter and close friend Jan Baptist Chrysostomus Verlooy (1747–97), also a Brussels lawyer, wrote an essay, D'onacht der moederlycke tael ("On the neglect of the native language"), in 1788 which has been described a precursor to the Flemish Movement.

== Sources and external links ==
This page has been translated from the Dutch article on Wikipedia.

- Ron Vonck
- www.dbnl.nl
- Website Aalst
