= Jan-Baptist Verlooy =

Flemish journalist and politician (1746–1797)

- Born: 22 December 1746; Houtvenne, Brabant, Austrian Netherlands
- Died: 4 May 1797 (aged 50); Brussels, French First Republic
- Occupations: Jurist; politician
- Notable work: Essay on the disregard of the native language in the Netherlands
- Political party: Vonckist

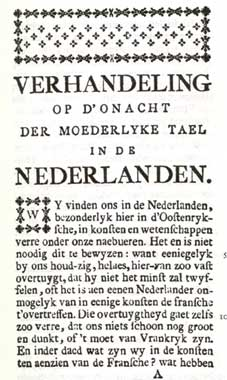
First page of the Essay on the disregard of the native language in the Netherlands (1788) by Jan-Baptist Verlooy

Jan-Baptist Chrysostomus Verlooy (Houtvenne, 22 December 1746 - Brussels, 4 May 1797) was a jurist and politician from the Austrian Netherlands who played an important role in the Brabant Revolution.

== Childhood and descent ==
Verlooy belonged to a family of local notables who owned extensive possessions and of whom some were invested with prominent power. An official document bearing 21 June 1720 as a definite date, bears testimony to the fact that his grandfather, Jan Verlooy (about 1657–1723), was a royal and hereditary notary ("conincklyck ende erfelyck notaris"). His grandfather Jan occupied the position of Secretary in Houtvenne. This position might have provided him with a degree of respectability which is proved by the fact that one of his grandchildren, Jan Frans Verlooy, referred to it when he applied to be a notary in the Chancery of Brabant in 1775. One can read in the assessment preceding his appointment that he descended from respectable parents, that his grand father was Secretary of Oosterwijk and that the family of his mother were one of the most honourable from the Campine ("van treffelijke ouders voortsgecomen, synen grootvader was Secretaris van Oosterwijck ende de familie van sijne moeder is eene van de treffelyckste uyt de Kempen"). Grand father Verlooy was buried in the church of Houtvenne, generally a privilege for the upper class.

Jan Baptist Chrysostomus’ father, Jan Frans Verlooy (1697–1773), was also Secretary in Houtvenne. If it is true that he was involved in agriculture as well, and this seems to be confirmed by the census in 1755, then he probably would not have been able to spend much time in this business. This can be deduced from the hundreds of pages in folio that he wrote while in service at his commune and which turn up in the registers of the municipal archives in Houtvenne, now in the state archives in Antwerp. He was mentioned various times in the journal of the priests of Houtvenne, now and then as Mr. Secretary Verlooy ("De Heer Secretaris Verloy"). The farmhouse he lived in, the so-called "Kauberg Schrans" was an impressive building. Situated to the north of the village, it belonged to the red brick construction of the hamlet "the Pig Market" ("de Varkensmarkt") or "the Square" ("de Plein"). It was surrounded by a deep moat, to the outside contiguous to the brick Saint Anne Chapel.

Jan Frans Verlooy carried responsibility for a large household. Ten children came from his first marriage with Anna Maria Meeus (Joanna Elisabeth, 1724, Jan Frans, 1726, Henricus, 1729, Anna Maria, 1730, Anna Catharina, 1732, Jan Frans, 1735, Petrus Antonius, 1737, Anna Barbara 1740, Ferdinandus Jozef, 1742, a nameless child, 1743). Out of his second marriage on 14 January 1744 with Anna Wouters, came eight descendants (Joannes Baptista, 1745, Joannes Baptista Chrysostomus, 1746, Adrianus Ferdinandus, 1748, Frans, 1750, Maria Theresia, 1752, Adrianus, 1754, Jan Frans, 1756, Guilelmus Norbertus, 1758). The second child from his second marriage was Jan Baptist Chrysostomus. Jan Frans Verlooy was buried on 1 September 1773 and his wife Anna Wouters was buried on 17 October 1764.

It would seem that Verlooy’s immediate ancestors could be considered to be among the notables of their village.

== Later life ==
In 1766 Verlooy went to Leuven to study law at the University. In 1774 he settled in Brussels and a year later he took the oath as a solicitor to the Brabant Counsel. In 1781 he published the Codex Brabanticus, a judicial manual about the laws valid in the Duchy of Brabant. The study bears testimony to his democratic and rationalist state of mind, as well as to his attachment to Brabant. In 1785 he wrote Emperor Joseph II in Vienna a letter denouncing the disregard of the Dutch language.

Verlooy’s most influential study on this subject appeared only two years later: the clandestine Essay on the disregard of the native language in the Netherlands, (in Dutch: Verhandeling op d’onacht der moederlyke tael in de Nederlanden). His point of view was one of a patriot and a democrat. He deeply regretted the worrisome situation of culture and literature in the Netherlands. He noticed that the Netherlands couldn’t compete in cultural matters with the French, the English, the Germans and the Italians, because the upper class and the intellectuals while adopting French neglected the language of the people, Dutch. This phenomenon first occurred when the Burgundian dukes ruled over the Netherlands and it reached its climax in Brussels, where the native language of 95% of the population was and remained nonetheless Dutch. Verlooy even noticed that some Flemings pretended to speak Dutch only poorly to make believe they had been educated in French. The writings of intellectuals who wrote in French but had French as a second language couldn’t compete with those by native French speakers, the result being that the writing style in French of the first was inferior to that of the latter. Verlooy considered the Dutch native language therefore as the only language in which the people could be cultivated and made to think for themselves. People should be aware of their history, the value of their language and their ancient democratic institutions. The language of a small people could be predestined for an important future. The awakening of the national sentiment would result in a political renaissance. Therefore, where Dutch is the language of the people, French should no longer be the language of the upper class, the intellectuals and the scientists, especially in Brussels. One could even consider the prohibition of all education in French. Fairytales in the primary section should be substituted by lectures treating subjects such as history and laws and charters of the Netherlands. In the secondary section, the French and Greek language would be optional, while as much time and care for the study of Dutch as that for the study of Latin would be taken. This whole programme would be accomplished by a mighty social class ready to claim its rights: the bourgeoisie, a class which will have to claim all rights for its language - the Dutch language of the people. To accept the benefit for the people as a criterion, to want to elevate the political awareness of the people and to want to remind them of the urban democracies in the Netherlands in former times, was in fact in 1788 quite an innovative idea, which made Verlooy anticipate modern thinking for about a century.

== Brabant Revolution ==
From the end of 1787 or beginning of 1788 on, he was regularly in contact with another advocate, Jan Frans Vonck. Vonck organised meetings with a group of advocates, usually at this home: Pieter Emmanuel de Lausnay, Martinus J.F. De Brouwer and Willem Willems. The meetings were in the Dutch language.

In the spring of 1789, Verlooy founded with Jan Frans Vonck the secret society "Pro Aris et Focis" (for Altar and Hearth), in order to prepare a rebellion against the emperor. In the fall of 1789 he became a member of the "Committee of Brussels" of the "Democrats" (with J.J. Torfs, Pieter Emmanual de Lausnay, J.Bpt.D. 't Kint, A. Daubremez, C.A. Fisco and De Noter). In fact, it is Verlooy who made the proposal to Vonck to organise a secret society with the name Pro Aris et Focis tasked with the liberation of the Belgian provinces from Austrian Habsburg despotism. They would simultaneously organise the rebellion in the cities and the emigration of patriots who would create an army willing to invade the homeland, which would also be the sign for a general revolt. Verlooy justified his intentions in a Dutch pamphlet and gave an explanation of his project: “three million Belgians suffer slavery... among them not less than 700.000 are fit enough to fight and are dissatisfied; ... one could easily find 300.000 people willing to risk their goods and their blood for their homeland. But in the same way as a prison guard is able to easily keep 200.000 prisoners in control - as they are locked up in isolation - a small number of soldiers - hardly 13.000 of them - separate us and keep us in slavery.” Vonck translated the regulations of the society into French, as they had first been drawn up in Dutch, and made them commonly known in all Walloon towns and cities. Thus, the initiative of Vonck and Verlooy led from a speechless but profound irritation and isolated riots to an overt and organised revolution.

During the Brabant Revolution which then started, he was thus part of the most liberal faction of the revolutionaries, known as the Vonckisten, named after their leader.

Verlooy’s Projet raisonné d’union des Provinces Belgiques had been published on 21 January 1790. The pamphlet was instantly seized by order of the Counsellor-General Prosecutor of Brabant. Verlooy was pleading for a kind of suffrage, based on ownership of property or tax assessment but which excluded few citizens of the right to vote, while allowing separated elections for the nobility and for the clergy. He also stated precisely that the deputies of the social classes would sit together in the Grand Conseil National. Verlooy became Vice President of the Société Patriotique, founded to take the lead for democratic action, and signed immediately after Vonck, the famous Adresse from 15 March 1790 requesting better representation of the population in the States. This Adresse would force him to run away and leave Brussels for Namur in the footsteps of Vonck, and afterwards to seek temporary shelter in Givet, Rijsel and Dowaai where he tried to reconcile the two main factions of the Brabant Revolution: the rather conservative Statists and the rather liberal Vonckists. He also brought together the exiled democrats in a new secret society: Pro Patria.

Verlooy only returned to Brussels after the Habsburg governors were restored to power.

== Occupation by the French ==
Verlooy’s enlightened ideas facilitated his choice for collaboration with the French during their military occupation of the Southern Netherlands. The Battle of Jemappes reignited his revolutionary fervour and he passionately dedicated himself again to politics. He was elected a provisory Brussels Deputy and became one of those tasked with visiting prisons to liberate those detainees who could be regarded as victims of arbitrariness or gothic and feudal laws. In the Treurenberg prison, Verlooy and the other investigators found only debtors. They also established that in the madhouses several individuals were detained rather for inhumane reasons than any natural disability. In the prison of Vilvoorde, they discovered prisoners who were detained due to not well-founded verdicts.

As a Deputy, Verlooy got into conflict with the majority of the provisory Deputies of Brussels, as he was anxious to establish a Belgian republic at once. Together with other radical democrats, he defended the immediate establishment of a central provisional government, whereas moderate democrats led by Cornet de Grez supported the election of a Convention nationale. Both parties tried in vain to get the support of the French General Dumouriez, commander of the French army of occupation.

When the foundation of a Belgian democratic republic seemed to be fruitless and as the policy of the French government proceeded from revolutionary intervention to annexation, Verlooy declared himself to be in favour of union with France.

On 15 January 1793 he published a Dutch pamphlet of forty pages, Zijn Geloof, Vryheyd en Eygendommen in gevaer ? (Are faith, freedom and property in danger?), in which he accused the privileged whom he thought to have become partisans of Austria and who would have called for the return of the Germans. Verlooy supported also the policy of the French Revolution towards religion.

In 1795 (18 Nivôse an III), he was appointed Mayor (maire) of the City of Brussels. While the French were at war with the whole civilised world of those days as well as demanding enormous efforts from the Belgians whose homeland they were simultaneously reshaping, Verlooy and his colleagues had the ungrateful task to protect their fellow citizens courageously and with dignity against the abuse and the atrocities of the new rulers. Verlooy did not keep his function as maire of Brussels for long: he withdrew from public life as soon as he saw through the real nature of the new regime and because he was also experiencing health problems. His health was already failing as a result of it being overstrained by what he went through during the Pro Aris et Focis episode of his life. He resigned as Mayor on the 10 Prairial, an III. On 1 November 1795 (10 Brumaire an IV), he led a delegation of Belgian patriots who came to find the representatives of the people, the commissaires of the Pérès and Portiez de l’Oise government who had arrived in Brussels with a mission, in order to warn them about the abuse with which the appointment to public functions is made and is renewed since the victorious arrival of the republican troops .... Appointed Judge of the Civil Court of the Department of the Dijle on 7 Frimair an IV (28 November 1795), Verlooy was forced to refuse this public function because of his health.

Verlooy died on 15 Floréal, an V (4 May 1797). His death had hardly been noticed in Brussels.

== Influence ==
In 1829, the Dutch professor J.M. Schrant, reprinted the Verhandeling op het niet achten der moederlijke tael in de Nederlanden, door een Brusselschen advocaat, in defence of the linguistic politics of King William I of the Netherlands. After the Belgian Revolution in 1830), another publicist, Adolphe Levae, blamed Verlooy for having voted for the union of Belgium with France. The historians of the Flemish Movement discovered around the 1900s that Verlooy was a unique advocate of the Dutch language. P. Hamelius mentioned him in his Histoire politique et littéraire du mouvement flamand (completed in 1894) and P. Fredericq did the same in his Schets eener geschiedenis der Vlaamsche beweging (published in 1906).

If Verlooy was a forerunner of the Flemish movement, his attitude towards the linguistic struggle was closely linked with profoundly democratic opinions and ideas.

Jan Baptist Verlooy was an advocate of the Dutch language and has hence been regarded as the founder of the Flemish movement. Nevertheless, he did not think about Flanders as his native country, but about Brabant and on a larger scale the whole of the Netherlands.

== Published works ==
Published works by Verlooy are, amongst others, the Codex Brabanticus and the Verhandeling op d’onacht der moederlyke tael in de Nederlanden.

== Sources ==
This English Wikipedia article is partly translated from the Dutch Wikipedia article, partly based upon a small essay by Suzanne Tassier.

- Jan Van den Broeck "J.B.C. Verlooy, vooruitstrevend jurist en politicus uit de 18e eeuw", Antwerpen, 1980 (nl)
- Paul De Ridder, "Nieuw licht op J.B.C. Verlooy (1746-1797) Vader van de Nederlandse beweging", Stichting Mens en Kultuur, Gent 2001 (nl)
- Suzanne Tassier, "J.-B.-C. Verlooy" in "Figures Révolutionnaires (XVIIIe s.)", La Renaissance du Livre, Brussel, 1942, blz. 87-105 (fr)
