= Alec Duncan Mitchell =

British chemist

Alec Duncan Mitchell (1888-1963) was a British chemist, assistant editor of the Journal of the Chemical Society, and a nomenclature expert to the International Union of Pure and Applied Chemistry.

== Publications ==
- British Chemical Nomenclature (1948)
