= Peter Mitchell =

Peter or Pete Mitchell may refer to:

== Media ==
- Pete Mitchell (broadcaster) (1958–2020), British broadcaster
- Peter Mitchell (newsreader) (born 1960), Australian journalist
- Peter Mitchell (photographer) (born 1943), British documentary photographer

== Sports ==
- Pete Mitchell (American football) (born 1971), American football player
- Peter Mitchell (cyclist) (born 1990), British racing cyclist
- Peter Mitchell (golfer) (born 1958), English golfer
- Peter Mitchell-Thomson, 2nd Baron Selsdon (1913–1963), British peer and racing driver
- Peter Mitchell (footballer), Northern Irish former professional footballer, wheelchair basketball player, actor and motivational speaker

== Others ==
- Peter Mitchell (politician) (1824–1899), Canadian politician
- Peter Chalmers Mitchell (1864–1945), British zoologist
- Peter D. Mitchell (1920–1992), British biochemist

== Fictional characters ==
- Peter Mitchell (Three Men and a Baby), from the film Three Men and a Baby and its sequel
- Pete Mitchell (Top Gun), nickname "Maverick", from the films Top Gun and Top Gun: Maverick
