= Margaret Howell Mitchell =

Canadian ornithologist

Margaret Knox Howell Mitchell (28 October 1901 – 3 October 1988) was Canada's first internationally recognized ornithologist.

== Early life and education ==
Howell was born in Toronto, Ontario on October 28, 1901 to her mother Lucy Knox, and George Howell. Mitchell chose to pursue an education at the University of Toronto. Mitchell graduated from the University of Toronto in 1924, where she studied Biology and Geology.

== Career ==
One of her most notable career achievements was becoming a Secretary at the Royal Ontario Museum in which she worked in the palaeontology department. After Mitchell's position at the Royal Ontario Museum she became a volunteer with the task of helping create and write the "Passenger Pigeon Inquiry" which later became "The Passenger Pigeon in Ontario" (1935). Her volunteer work in ornithology lead to Mitchell to attain the title of the first woman research affiliate in any natural history museum in Canada. She was also a member of the American Ornithologists' Union (AOU) in 1928 and the Wilson Ornithological Society in 1933, although at the time was not allowed to join the all-male birds clubs in the Toronto Area.

== Research and findings ==
Mitchell later moved to Brazil with her family in 1950. While in Brazil, she discovered the Avifauna, which eventually led to two papers to be published in The Auk and the Wilson Bulletin in 1954, and a monograph on Brazilian birds (1957). On top of that, Mitchell had discovered at least 289 bird species in Rio de Janeiro.

In 1958, she was made an "Elective member" of the AOU as a follow-up to her notoriety from her publishings. Mitchell's observations continued over to Britain, Barbados, and the Canadian Northwest.

== Personal life ==
Mitchell married Osborne Mitchell in 1927. Later in life she suffered from a few strokes and was a wheelchair user for the remainder of her life. She died in 1988.
