= Mittell =

Mittell is a surname. Notable people with the surname include:

- Jackie Mittell (1906–1976), Welsh professional footballer
- Jason Mittell (born 1970), American professor
- Lynn Mittell (born 1947), better known as Owen Money, Welsh musician, actor, comedian, and radio presenter

== See also ==
- Sybilla Mittell Weber (1892-1957), American artist
- Mitchell (disambiguation)
