= Alex Mitchell (Australian footballer) =

Australian rules footballer, born 1912

Personal information
- Full name: Alex Mitchell
- Born: 16 May 1912
- Died: 9 April 2001 (aged 88)
- Original team: Rosedale
- Height: 180 cm (5 ft 11 in)
- Weight: 93 kg (205 lb)
- Position: Ruck / forward

Playing career^{1}
| Years | Club | Games (Goals) |
| 1936–1940, 1943 | South Melbourne | 58 (34) |
- ^{1} Playing statistics correct to the end of 1943.

Alex Mitchell (16 May 1912 – 9 April 2001) was an Australian rules footballer who played for the South Melbourne Football Club in the Victorian Football League (VFL).
