= GTRI Advanced Concepts Laboratory =

Advanced Concepts Laboratory
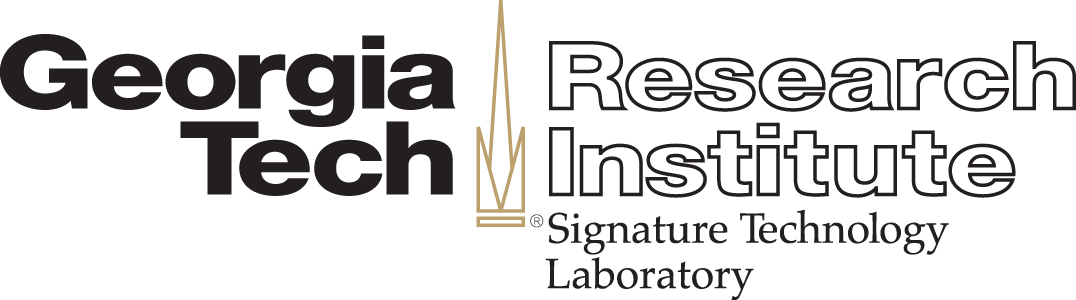
- Company type: Nonprofit
- Industry: electromagnetic materials, electromagnetic apertures, optical and infrared physics, quantum information systems
- Headquarters: Atlanta, Georgia, USA
- Key people: Mark Mitchell; Laboratory Director
- Parent: Georgia Tech Research Institute
- Website: gtri.gatech.edu/acl

The Advanced Concepts Laboratory (ACL), formerly the Signature Technology Laboratory, is one of eight labs in the Georgia Tech Research Institute and one of three labs under the Sensors and Intelligent Systems directorate. ACL conducts research and development in four technical areas: electromagnetic materials and structures, electromagnetic apertures and scattering, optical and infrared physics and phenomenology, and secure information systems.

== Research areas ==
ACL's primary focus is to take more academic-based research and create prototype devices that demonstrate new technologies. In particular, the laboratory specializes in antenna design, quantum computing, and electromagnetic materials. In addition to those fields, they are also specialized in signal processing, electronic attack and protection, and optical and infrared physics.

The laboratory maintains an extensive numerical modeling and measurement capability for the design and development of thin, broadband antennas with tailored performance and controlled impedance surfaces for management/control of signature characteristics of systems and components; they cover electromagnetic phenomena from quasi-static to ultraviolet wavelengths. Numerical modeling has recently been extended to nano- and micro-magnetics phenomena with emphasis placed on modeling of nano particle nonlinear magnetics (NPNM). Novel techniques for correlating optical and infrared scattering properties with material composition have been developed and modeled for application to paint and photographic film characterization, optical signature control, and the evaluation of sensors and image based tracking algorithms.

ACL maintains and operates extensive facilities for optical measurements specializing in laser and white light scatterometry, electromagnetic materials characterization, radar cross-section measurements, antenna characterization, computational electromagnetics, and ion trap quantum computing using hyperfine and optical qubits. The secure information systems work is nationally recognized for the design, development, and deployment of enterprise information systems requiring state-of-the-art database, platform, and Internet security.
