= Garrett Mitchell =

Garrett Mitchell may refer to:

- Garrett Mitchell (baseball) (born 1998), American baseball outfielder
- Garrett Mitchell (ice hockey) (born 1991), Canadian ice hockey player
- Lawrence Garrett Mitchell (born 1995), American YouTube personality who uses the persona Cleetus McFarland
