= Pro aris et focis =

Common latin phrase

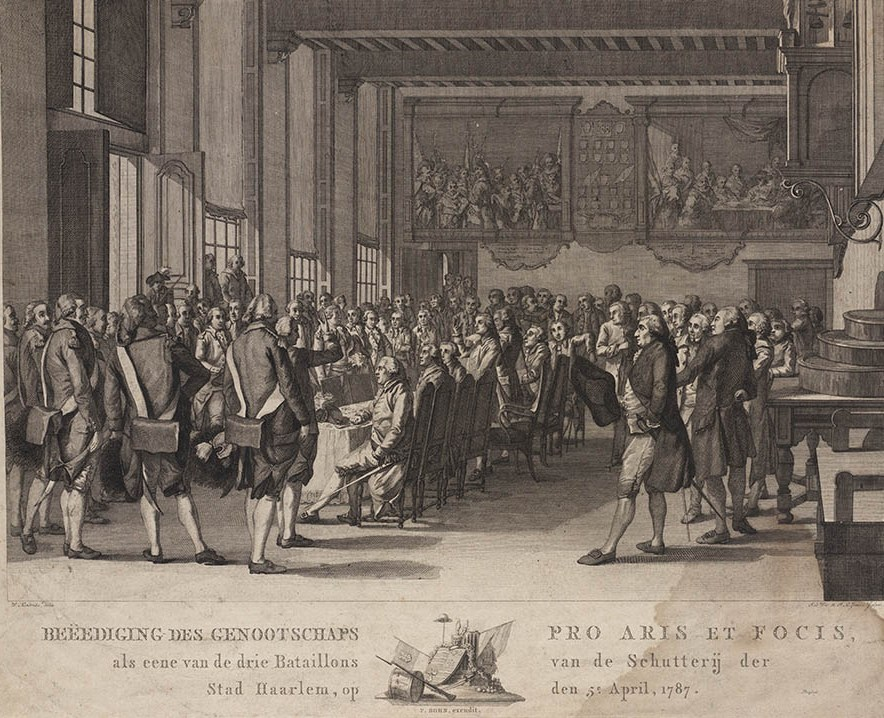
Formal end of the "orange" military Civic guard in Haarlem, and start of a new "Patriotic people's militia" called "Pro Aris et Focis" (1787)

Pro aris et focis ("for hearth and home") and Pro Deo et patria ("for God and country") are two Latin phrases used as the motto of many families, military regiments and educational institutions. Pro aris et focis literally translates "for altars and hearths", but is used by ancient authors to express attachment to all that was most dear and is more idiomatically translated "for hearth and home", since the Latin term aris generally refers to the altars of the spirits of the house (the Lares) and is often used as a synecdoche for the family home.

== Family motto ==
Pro Aris et Focis is the motto of many families such as the Blomfields of Norfolk, the Mulvihills of Ireland, the Waits of Scotland, a private members club in Australia, the United Service Club Queensland and of military regiments all over the world, such as the Middlesex Yeomanry of Britain, the Royal Queensland Regiment of Australia and the Victoria Rifles of Canada. In France, during the French Revolution, Henri du Vergier, Marquis de La Rochejacquelein, General-in Chief of the Catholic and Royal Army in the Vendée, took this motto.

== Secret society ==
Pro Aris et Focis is the name of a secret society in Brussels in 1789 which prepared the Brabant Revolution against the Austrian Emperor Joseph II. The leading figure was Jan-Baptist Verlooy.

== Motto of institutions ==
"For God and country" is the motto of the American Legion.

Deo et Patriae is the motto of Regis High School (New York City). Pro Deo et Patria is the motto of both Archbishop Carroll High School and American University in Washington, D.C.

"Pro Aris et Focis is the motto for "Academia San Jorge", a Puerto Rico PK-12 school. The motto is embedded in the school's shield and logo. The school is located in Santurce, Puerto Rico.

Pro Aris et Focis is the motto for Maritzburg College, a high school in South Africa, and the motto is embedded in the school's shield.

Pro Aris et PRO Focis was the motto of the 71st New York State Volunteers, "The American Guard", which was formed not long before the Civil War and saw service in that War, and down to almost the present time. Its HQ was in the old Armory at 34th and Park Avenue in New York City. The building no longer stands, but plaque parts of its original structure have been incorporated into the walls of the skyscraper that presently occupies the site.

It one of the mottoes of Bristol University.

"For God, for Country, and for Yale" is one of the mottoes of Yale University, inscribed in stone on many of the university's residential colleges and frequently invoked at the annual Harvard-Yale football game. It also features in Yale college songs like Bright College Years and is often seen on flyers and graffiti on the Yale campus.

"Deus et Patria" is the motto of the NAS Oceana based U.S. Navy Strike Fighter Squadron 32, nicknamed "The Fighting Swordsmen".

== God, Family, and Country ==
There exists a traditional English Hendiatris that combines elements from both of the Latin mottoes: "God, Family, and Country". The phrase is meant to express devotion to what many consider the three pillars of traditional society: religion, family values, and patriotism.

== Death of Osama Bin Laden ==
In May 2011, the phrase "For God and country" was used as a confirmation signal by U.S. Navy SEALs during the death of Osama bin Laden in Abbottabad, Pakistan. On his radio, the U.S. Navy SEAL Ground Commander reported over a radio, “For God and country, Geronimo, Geronimo, Geronimo.” After a pause, he added, “Geronimo EKIA” (enemy killed in action).
