= Sam Mitchell =

Sam Mitchell may refer to:

- Sam Mitchell (basketball) (born 1963), American former basketball player and coach
- Sam Mitchell (footballer) (born 1982), Australian rules player
- Sam Mitchell (EastEnders), fictional character in the TV series EastEnders
- Sam Mitchell (Florida politician)
- Sam Mitchell (Oklahoma politician)

== See also ==
- Samuel Mitchell (disambiguation)
