= Thomas Mitchell (painter) =

British marine painter and naval official (died 1790)

Thomas Mitchell (fl. 1735–1790; died 1790) was an English marine painter, who exhibited at the Free Society of Artists in 1763 and 1768 and at the Royal Academy from 1774 to 1789. He was also a naval official, and became eventually assistant-surveyor of the navy.

== Life ==
Thomas Mitchell was a shipwright by profession who also practised with some success as a painter of marine subjects. He first exhibited at the Free Society of Artists in 1763, when he was residing on Tower Hill. He exhibited there again in 1768 and the following years, when he was employed as assistant shipbuilder at Chatham dockyard. In 1774 he appears as builder's assistant at Deptford dockyard, and was afterwards employed in the navy office, becoming eventually assistant surveyor of the navy. He exhibited at the Royal Academy from 1774 to 1789. A number of drawings by Mitchell entered the print room at the British Museum, the earliest dated being a view of Westminster Bridge in 1735. Some of his drawings were engraved.

== Gallery ==
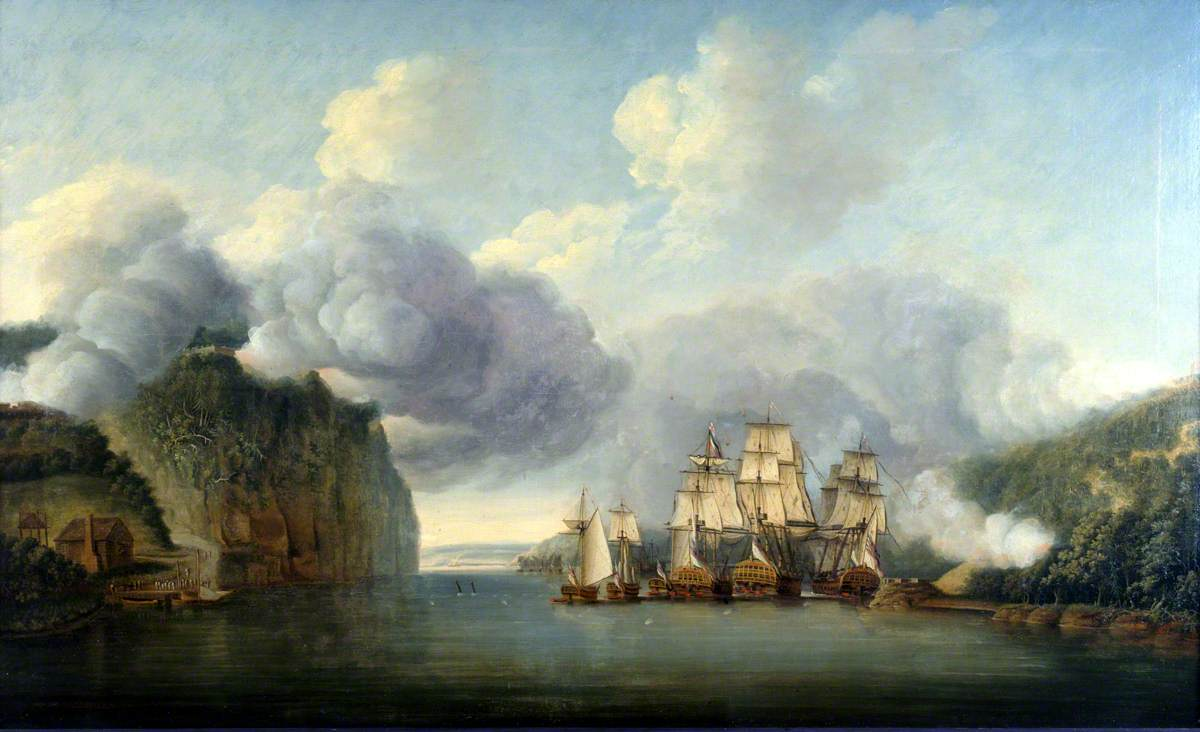
Forcing a passage of the Hudson River, 9 October 1776

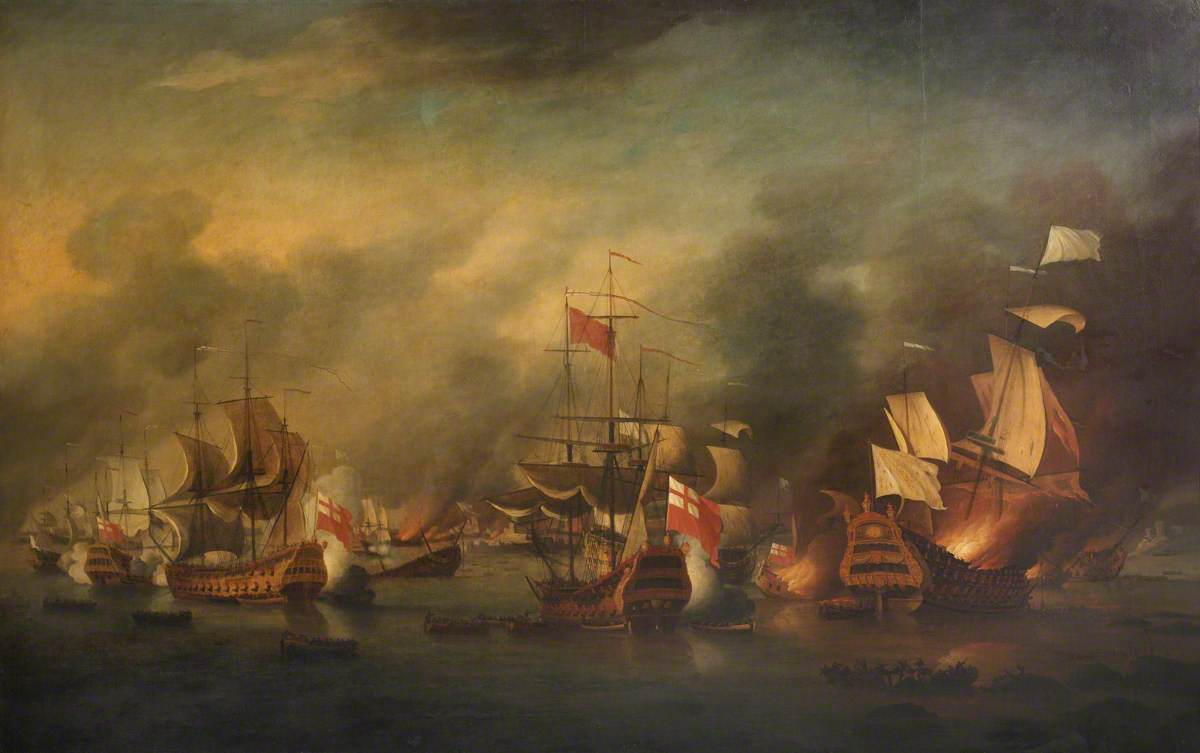
The Battle of La Hogue, 23 May 1692 (1779)

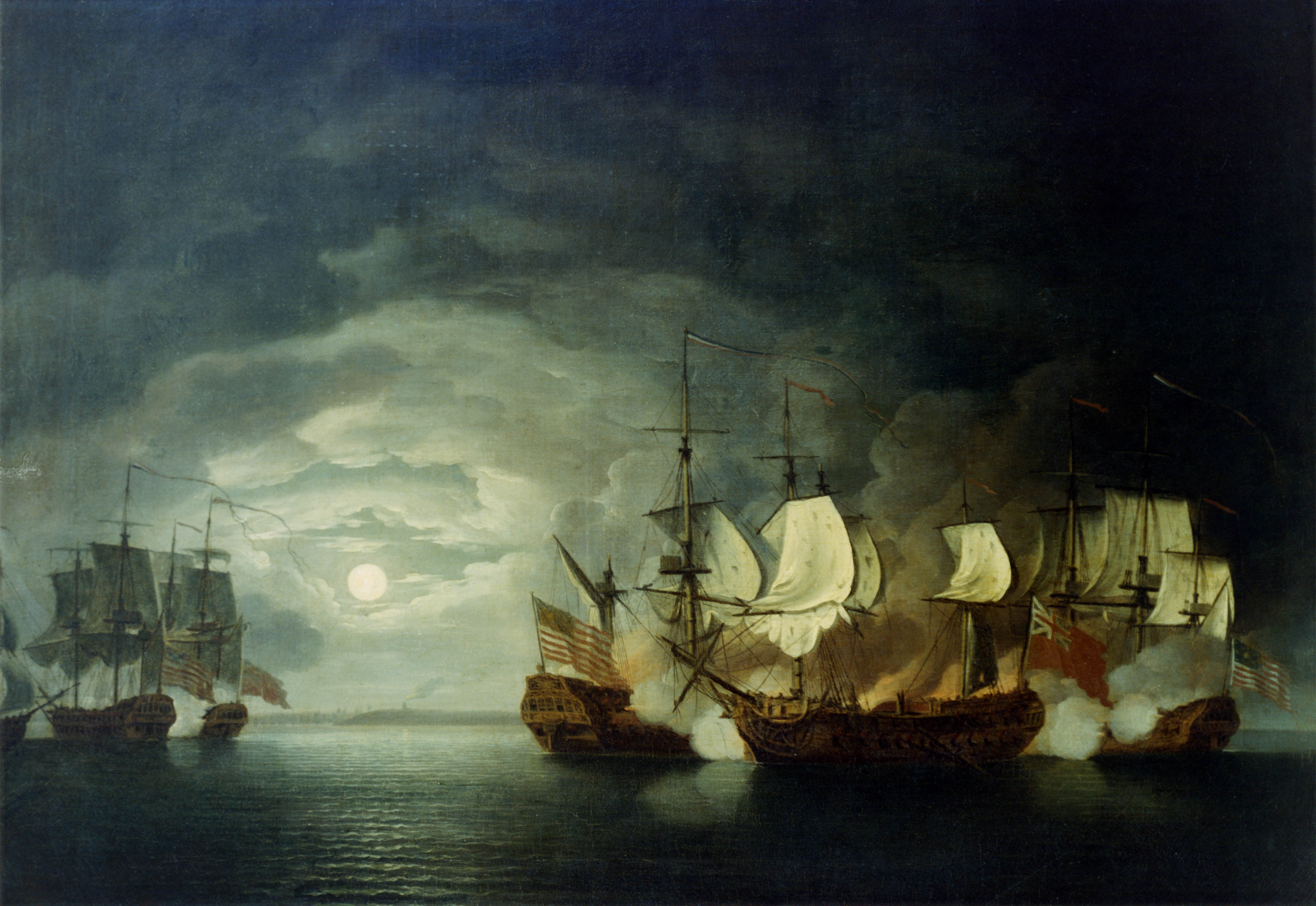
Bonhomme Richard and HMS Serapis (1780)

The Battle of the Saints, 12 April 1782 (1782)

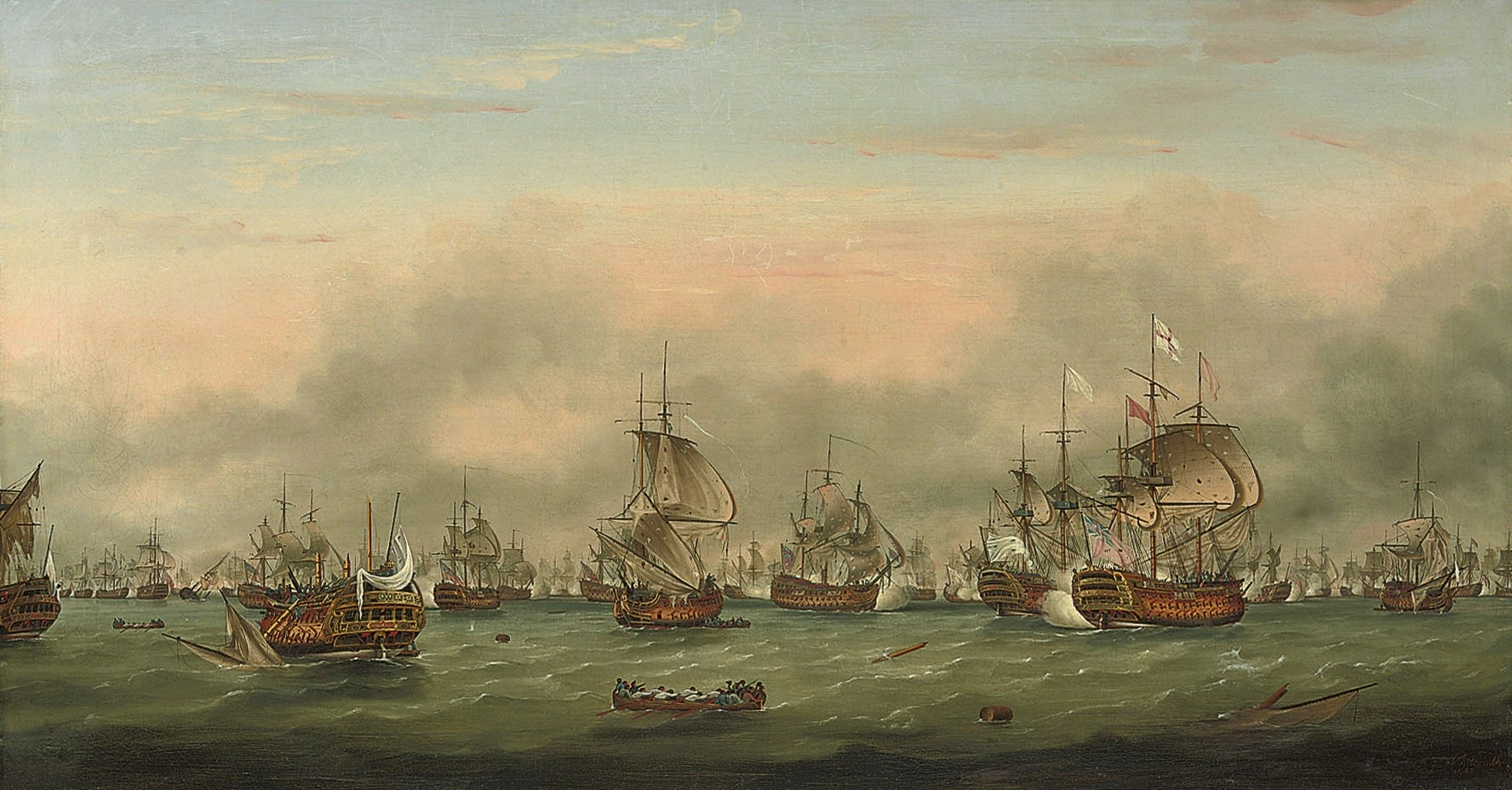
The Battle of the Saintes, 12th April, 1782

== Sources ==
- Cust, L. H.; Adolph, R. J. S (2008). "Mitchell, Thomas (d. 1790), marine painter and naval official". Oxford Dictionary of National Biography (online ed.). Oxford University Press. doi:10.1093/ref:odnb/18850. (Subscription or UK public library membership required.)
- Graves, Algernon (1884). A Dictionary of Artists Who Have Exhibited Works in the Principal London Exhibitions of Oil Paintings From 1760 to 1880. London: George Bell and Sons. p. 162.
- Oliver, Valerie Cassel, ed. (2011). "Mitchell, Thomas". Benezit Dictionary of Artists. Oxford Art Online. Retrieved 19 September 2022.
- Redgrave, Samuel (1878). "Mitchell, Thomas". A Dictionary of Artists of the English School. New ed. London: George Bell and Sons. p. 295.
- "Thomas Mitchell". The British Museum. Retrieved 19 September 2022.

Attribution:

- This article incorporates text from a publication now in the public domain: Cust, Lionel Henry (1894). "Mitchell, Thomas (fl.1735-1790)". In Lee, Sidney (ed.). Dictionary of National Biography. Vol. 38. London: Smith, Elder & Co. p. 73.
