= Norval Mitchell =

Indian civil servant (1906–1988)

Alfred Norval Mitchell in dress uniform with OBE and India General Service medal 1908-1935, 1943

Alfred Norval Mitchell OBE (18 December 1906 – 1988) was a British civil servant and political officer in India. He served in India from 1930 to 1947, initially with the Indian Civil Service and transferring to the Indian Political Service in 1934. He was appointed Officer of the Order of the British Empire in the London Gazette 2 June 1943 as Political Agent, Orissa States Agency.

His final position was Chief Secretary of the North-West Frontier Province under the Governor, Sir Olaf Caroe. His later career included Clerk to the Legislative Council of Northern Rhodesia and Secretary and Registrar of the University of St Andrews.

In 1968 he completed a biography of Sir George Cunningham, Governor of the Northwest Frontier Province of India 1937-46 and again 1947–48, which was published by William Blackwood, Edinburgh. In 1975 he completed an autobiography covering his early life and his service in India. This was edited and published posthumously in 2006 by his son, David Norval Mitchell, under the title The Quiet People of India. It is an account of the last 17 years of the British Raj in India.
