= Liam Mulvihill =

Irish Gaelic games administrator (born 1946)

Director-General of the Gaelic Athletic Association
- In office 1 June 1979 – 31 January 2008
- Preceded by: Seán Ó Síocháin
- Succeeded by: Páraic Duffy

Personal details
- Born: 25 May 1946 (age 79) Keenagh, County Longford, Ireland
- Spouse: Máire Ní Shiochrú (m. 1981)
- Children: Daráine, Aonghus, Fionán
- Occupation: Primary schools inspector

Liam Mulvihill (born 25 May 1946) is an Irish retired Gaelic games administrator. He served as Director-General of the Gaelic Athletic Association from June 1979 until January 2008.

Born in Keenagh, County Longford, Mulvihill was the eldest of ten children. He was educated at St. Mel's College, where he won a Hogan Cup medal in 1963, and later qualified as a primary school teacher from St. Patrick's College in Dublin. Mulvihill moved to Nenagh, County Tipperary in 1974 when he was appointed as a primary schools inspector.

Mulvihill played Gaelic football for Kenagh and at all grades for the Longford county team before becoming involved in the administration of the game. He served as secretary of the Kenagh minors, a position which led to his representing the club on the Longford Minor Board. Mulvihill was subsequently appointed to the Longford County Board. He was elected vice-president of the board at the age of 23 before being elected chairman in 1970. Mulvihill served in this position until 1974 when he was elected Longford county representative on the GAA's Central Council.

Mulvihill was the unanimous choice to succeed Seán Ó Síocháin as Director-General of the GAA in 1979. Over the course of his 29-year tenure he oversaw some of the major changes within the GAA, most notably the redevelopment of Croke Park between 1993 and 2005, the abolition of Rule 21 (2001) and Rule 42 (2007).

Sporting positions
Preceded by Séamus McGuire	Vice-President of the Longford County Board; 1969–1970	Succeeded by Brian Lynch
Preceded by Jimmy Flynn	Chairman of the Longford County Board; 1970–1974	Succeeded by John Fay
Preceded by Seán Ó Síocháin	Director-General of the Gaelic Athletic Association; 1979–2008	Succeeded by Páraic Duffy
