= Samuel Mitchell =

Samuel Mitchell may refer to:

- Samuel Mitchell (Western Australian politician) (1838–1912), Western Australian politician
- Samuel Mitchell (VC) (1841–1894), Victoria Cross recipient
- Samuel Alfred Mitchell (1874–1960), Canadian astronomer
- Samuel Augustus Mitchell (1790–1868), American geographer
- Samuel Brown Wylie Mitchell (1828–1879), founder of Phi Kappa Sigma fraternity
- Samuel James Mitchell (1852–1926), South Australian politician and judge
- Samuel N. Mitchell (1846–1905), American lyricist
- Samuel Mitchell (1750-1805), British Governor of Grenada from 1795-1796.

== See also ==
- Samuel L. Mitchill (1764–1831), American doctor and politician
- Sam Mitchell (disambiguation)
