= Ian Mitchell =

Ian Mitchell may refer to:

- Ian Mitchell (author), Scottish-South African writer
- Ian Mitchell (English cricketer) (1925–2011), English cricketer
- Ian Mitchell (footballer) (1946–1996), Dundee United F.C. player
- Ian Mitchell (ice hockey) (born 1999), Canadian ice hockey defenceman
- Ian Mitchell (murder victim), Scottish man murdered in the House of Blood murders
- Ian Mitchell (musician) (1958–2020), guitarist of Scottish pop group the Bay City Rollers
- Ian Mitchell (South African cricketer) (born 1977), South African cricketer
- Ian Mitchell (sailor), British World Champion sailor
