= Arthur Mitchell =

Arthur Mitchell may refer to:

- Arthur Mitchell (cricketer) (1902–1976), England Test cricketer
- Arthur Mitchell (dancer) (1934–2018), African-American dancer and choreographer
- Arthur Mitchell (physician) (1826–1909), antiquary, commissioner of Lunacy
- Arthur Mitchell (Yukon politician) (born 1950), leader of the Canadian Yukon Liberal Party
- Arthur Brownlow Mitchell, member of the Parliament of Northern Ireland for Queen's University of Belfast
- Arthur Crichton Mitchell (1864–1952), Scottish physicist and meteorologist
- Arthur Percy Mitchell (1880–1968), provincial politician from Alberta, Canada
- Arthur Wergs Mitchell (1883–1968), first African-American elected to the United States House of Representatives as a member of the Democratic Party
- Arthur Mitchell (Dexter), fictional character and main antagonist in the fourth season of Dexter
