= Letila Mitchell =

Letila Mitchell is a Rotuman performing artist from Fiji. She is the former director of the Fiji Arts Council and the founder of the Pacific Arts Alliance.

== Life ==
Mitchell studied sociology and psychology at the University of the South Pacific, graduating with a bachelor's degree. She also completed a postgraduate qualification at the university in cultural management.

Mitchell has worked with a number of Rotuman cultural groups, including Rako Pasefika which visited New Zealand in 2018 to connect the young people of the dance group with elderly Rotumans living in Auckland. The dance group also performed at the 2018 Commonwealth Games on the Gold Coast, Australia.
