= Danny Ray Mitchell =

American politician (1943–2013)

Danny Ray Mitchell, Sr. (August 23, 1943 – May 2, 2013) was an American businessman, Baptist minister, and politician.

Born in Shreveport, Louisiana, Mitchell graduated from Booker T. Washington High School. He served in the United States Air Force and then open a men's clothing store in Shreveport. Mitchell went to University of Maryland and then graduated from Southern University. In 1976, Mitchell became a Baptist minister and continued his education going to: Shreveport Bible College, United Theology Seminary, Baptist Christian College, and Moody Institute of Theology. Mitchell served in the Louisiana House of Representatives from 1991 to 1999 and was a Democrat. Mitchell died in Shreveport, Louisiana.
