= Joe Mitchell (baseball) =

American baseball player

- Outfielder

Negro league baseball debut
- 1932, for the Montgomery Grey Sox

Last appearance
- 1932, for the Montgomery Grey Sox
- Stats at Baseball Reference

Teams
- Montgomery Grey Sox (1932)

Joseph Mitchell is an American former Negro league outfielder who played in the 1930s.

Mitchell played for the Montgomery Grey Sox in 1932. In 26 recorded games, he posted 25 hits with a home run in 90 plate appearances.
