= Richard Mitchell (disambiguation) =

Richard Mitchell (1929–2002) was an American professor of English and classics.

Richard Mitchell may also refer to:

== Politicians ==
- Richard Mitchell (MP for Weymouth and Melcombe Regis), MP for Weymouth and Melcombe Regis
- Richard Mitchell (Florida politician) (born 1956), American politician from Florida
- Richard H. Mitchell (1869–1933), American judge and politician from New York
- Bob Mitchell (British politician) (Richard Charles Mitchell, 1927–2003), English politician

== Musicians ==
- Richard G. Mitchell (born 1956), film composer
- Blue Mitchell (Richard Allen Mitchell, 1930–1979), American trumpeter

== Others ==
- Mike Mitchell (cricketer) (Richard Arthur Henry Mitchell, 1843–1905), English amateur cricketer
- Richard Mitchell (cricketer, born 1913) (1913–1988), Grenadian-born Trinidadian cricketer
- Richard Mitchell (racing driver) (born 1967), American stock car racing driver
- Richard F. Mitchell (1889–1969), justice of the Iowa Supreme Court
- Richard P. Mitchell, history professor at the University of Michigan
- R. Bland Mitchell (1887–1961), Episcopal bishop
- Rick Mitchell (Richard Charles Mitchell, 1955–2021), Australian track and field athlete
- Richard Mitchell (EastEnders), fictional character
