= Mark Mitchell (researcher) =

American scientist

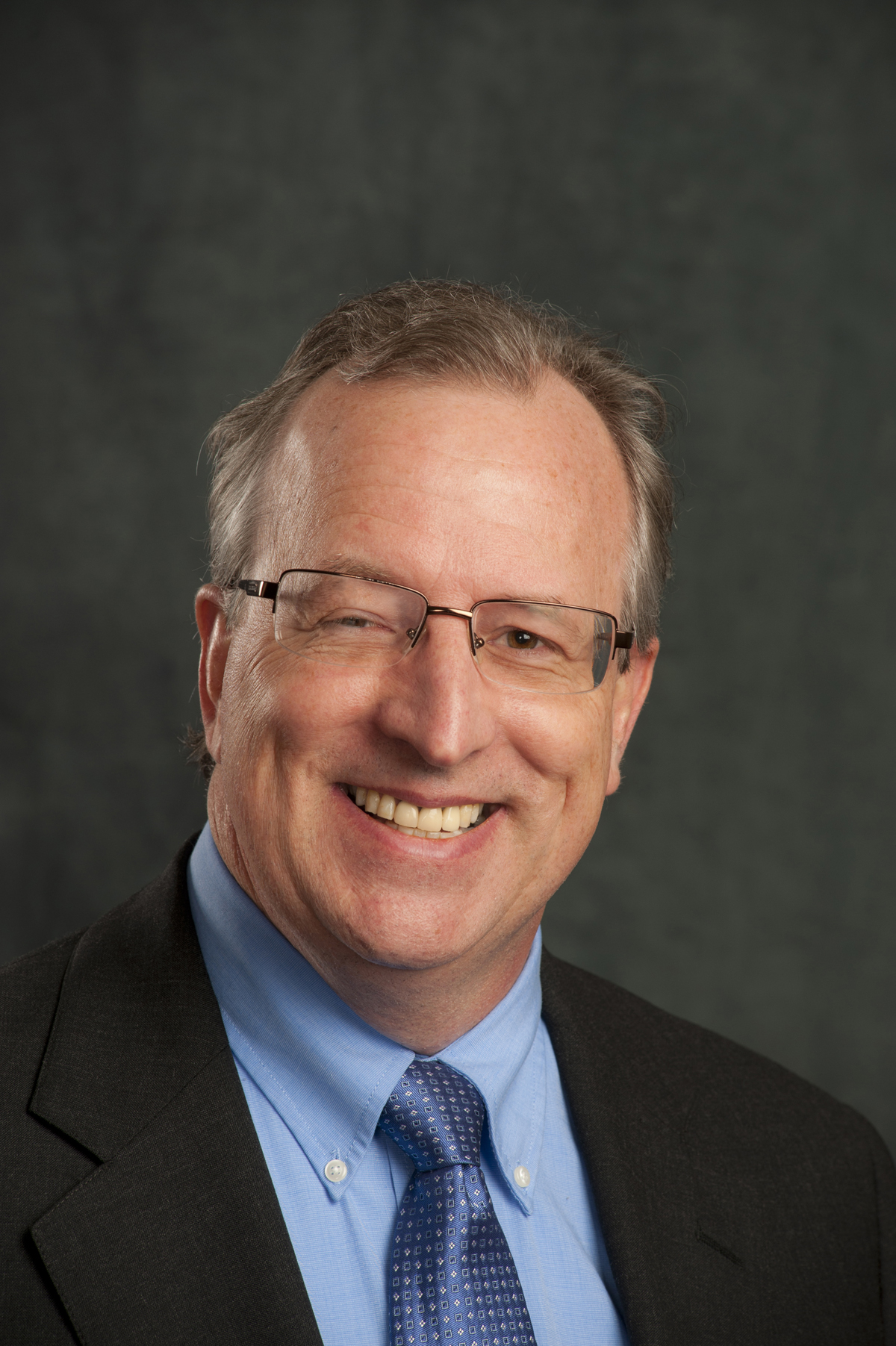
- Education: Georgia Institute of Technology (BS, MS)
- Known for: Antennas and radar research
- Scientific career
- Workplaces: Georgia Tech Research Institute

Mark A. Mitchell is the director of the Applied Concepts Laboratory at the Georgia Tech Research Institute, a position he has held since 2013.

== Education ==
Mitchell received Bachelor of Science in Electrical Engineering and Master of Science in Electrical Engineering degrees from the Georgia Institute of Technology in 1985 and 1986, respectively. As a student at Georgia Tech, he worked for the campus radio station, WREK, serving terms as music director and programming director during his time there.

== Career ==
Mitchell began working at GTRI in 1987 as a research engineer. During his career, he has been involved with the government teams that developed a number of modern phased array systems, including the THAAD radar and the Cobra Judy Replacement program. He undertook key roles in several defense acquisition programs heading several Antenna Integrated Product Team (IPT). Mitchell was named interim director of the Applied Concepts Laboratory in November 2013 and was later made permanent director.
