= William Mitchell (writer) =

English maritime writer

- Born: 1811; Modbury
- Died: 1 May 1878 (aged 66–67); Ivybridge, Devonshire
- Occupation: Maritime writer

Sir William Mitchell (1811 – 1 May 1878) was an English maritime writer.

== Biography ==
Mitchell was the son of John Mitchell of Modbury in Devon. He was born at Modbury in 1811. At an early age he came to London as a journalist, was for some time on the 'True Sun,' and from 1836 was chief proprietor and editor of the 'Shipping and Mercantile Gazette,' a daily paper which he established, and which at once took the high position it has since maintained. In 1840 he began to urge the importance, and indeed the necessity, of compulsory examinations for officers of merchant ships; and it was mainly in consequence of his action that the Mercantile Marine Act 1850 (13 & 14 Vict. c. 93) was passed. In 1857 he was called on to advise with the registrar-general of seamen in the preparation of the measure for the royal naval reserve, which eventually took form in the Royal Naval Reserve (Volunteer) Act 1859 (22 & 23 Vict. c. 40) 'for the Establishment of a Reserve Volunteer Force of Seamen, and for the Government of the same'. He succeeded in introducing an international code of signals, which was gradually adopted by every maritime country, and in establishing signal stations for reporting the movements of all ships using the international code. In reward for his public services he was knighted in 1867, and in 1869 was nominated by the king of Sweden a knight commander of the order of St. Olaf. He edited ' A Review of the Merchant Shipping Bill, being a Series of Leading Articles . . . from the " Shipping and Mercantile Gazette,"' 1869, 8vo, and < Maritime Notes and Queries, a Record of Shipping Law and 1873–6, 4to. He died at Strode, near Ivybridge, Devonshire, on 1 May 1878. He married in 1835 Caroline, eldest daughter of Richard Andrews of Modbury.
