= Senator Mitchell (disambiguation) =

George J. Mitchell (born 1933) was a U.S. Senator from Maine from 1980 to 1995. Senator Mitchell may also refer to:

== Members of the United States Senate ==
- Hugh Mitchell (politician) (1907–1996), U.S. Senator from 1944 to 1946
- John H. Mitchell (1835–1905), U.S. Senator from Oregon from 1901 to 1905; also served in the Oregon State Senate
- John I. Mitchell (1838–1907), U.S. Senator from Pennsylvania from 1881 to 1887
- John L. Mitchell (1842–1904), U.S. Senator from Wisconsin from 1893 to 1899; also served in the Wisconsin State Senate
- Stephen Mix Mitchell (1743–1835), U.S. Senator from Connecticut from 1793 to 1795

== United States state senate members ==
- Anderson Mitchell (1800–1876), North Carolina State Senate
- Betty Lou Mitchell (born 1937), Maine State Senate
- Clarence Mitchell III (1939–2012), Maryland State Senate
- Clarence Mitchell IV (born 1962), Maryland State Senate
- George Mitchell (Wisconsin politician) (1822–1908), Wisconsin State Senate
- Harlan Erwin Mitchell (1924–2011), Georgia State Senate
- Harry Mitchell (born 1940), Arizona State Senate
- Holly Mitchell (born 1964), California State Senate
- Isaac B. Mitchell (1888–1977), New York State Senate
- James George Mitchell (1847–1919), Pennsylvania State Senate
- Jethro Mitchell (fl. 1820s), Massachusetts State Senate
- John Joseph Mitchell (1873–1925), Massachusetts State Senate
- Libby Mitchell (born 1940), Maine State Senate
- MacNeil Mitchell (1904–1996), New York State Senate
- Nathaniel Mitchell (1753–1814), Delaware State Senate
- Richard Mitchell (Florida politician) (born 1956), Florida State Senate
- Richard H. Mitchell (1869–1933), New York State Senate
- Shawn Mitchell (fl. 1990s–2010s), Colorado State Senate
- Theo Mitchell (born 1938), South Carolina State Senate
- Thomas B. Mitchell (died 1876), New York State Senate
- Wendell Mitchell (1940–2012), Alabama State Senate
- Wiley F. Mitchell (born 1932), Virginia State Senate

== See also ==
- Senator Michel (disambiguation)
- Charles B. Mitchel (1815–1864), U.S. Senator from Arkansas in 1861 and Confederate States Senator from Arkansas from 1862 to 1864
- Samuel L. Mitchill (1764–1831), U.S. Senator from New York from 1804 to 1809
