= Bruce H. Mitchell =

Canadian business executive (born 1946)

Bruce H. Mitchell (born 1946) is a Canadian business executive. He is president and chief executive officer of Permian Industries Limited, a Toronto-based management and holding company with interests in the North American food processing, technology and water purification industries. Permian's wholly owned subsidiaries include Ajax Precision Manufacturing Ltd., a manufacturer of metal stampings and assemblies for the North American automobile industry; Trophy Foods, Inc., one of Canada's largest processors and distributors of edible nuts and related products; and Integrated Solutions Groups, Inc., a technology services and computer hardware provider operating in the U.S. Midwest. In total, Permian employs approximately 1,000 people at its 15 locations in North America.

Mitchell has been Vice-Chair of the Board of Trustees and a Councillor of Queen's University, Vice-Chair of the Canadian Institute for Advanced Research and has served on the Board and executive committees of Ridley College and UNICEF Canada.

Mitchell served on the board of directors of: CFM Corporation, Garbell Holdings Limited, GSW Inc and the Bank of Montreal. His total compensation from the Bank of Montreal in 2010 was $483,152.

Mitchell holds a B.Sc. (Civil Engineering) from Queen's University and an M.B.A. from Harvard University.

He previously served as the chairman of Promanad Communications Inc. and Corvair Oils Ltd., and was president of The Toronto Golf Club. In 2018 he was Captain of the Royal and Ancient Golf Club - the first Canadian to hold the office.

In 2023, Queen's University announced a $30,000,000 donation by Mitchell to advance various research programs at the University.
