= Daniel G. Mitchell =

U.S. Army general

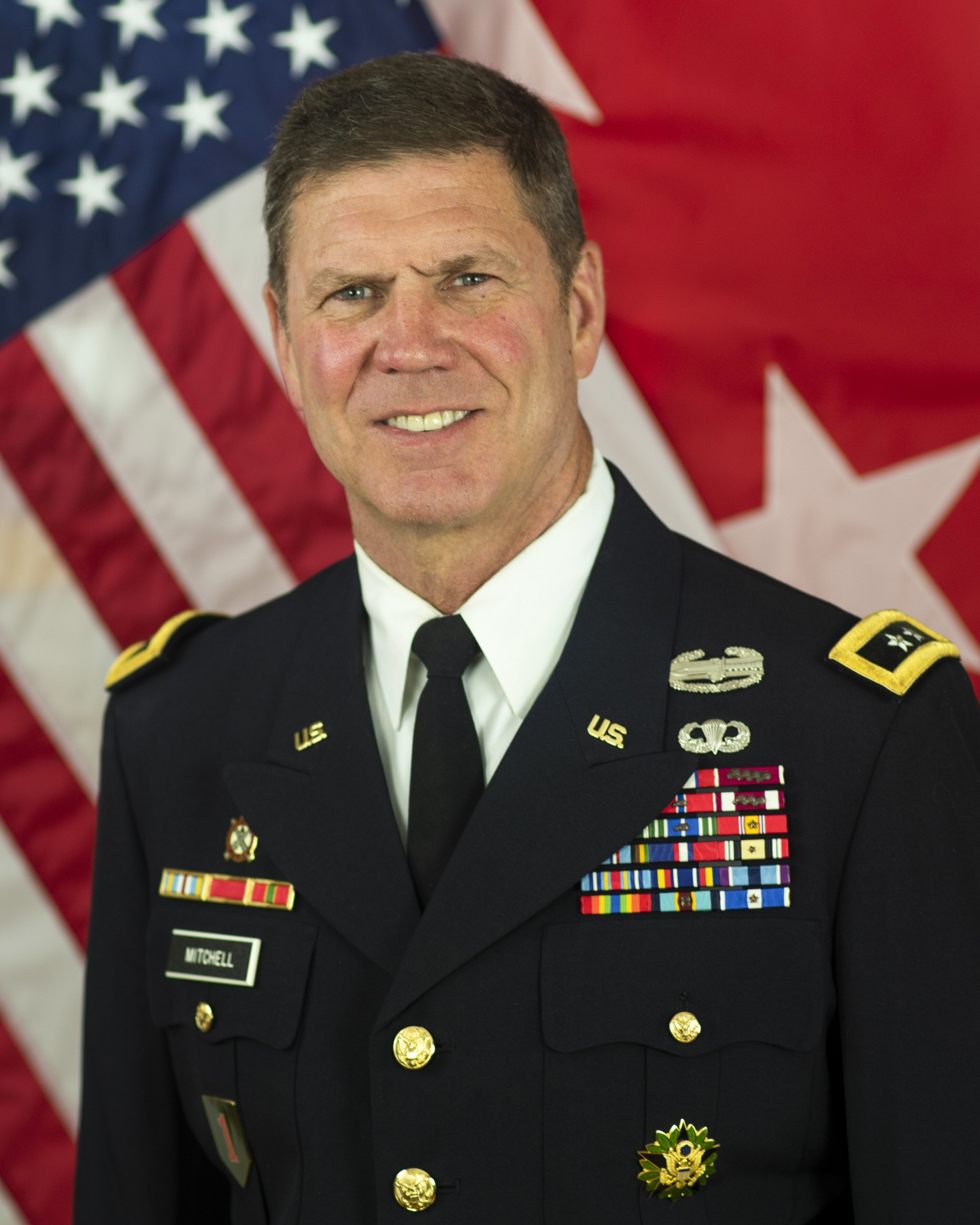
- Born: Princeville, Illinois, U.S.
- Military career
- Allegiance: United States
- Branch: United States Army
- Service years: 1985–2021
- Rank: Major General
- Commands: United States Army Sustainment Command

Daniel Garrett Mitchell is a retired United States Army major general who last served as the Commanding General of the United States Army Sustainment Command from June 24, 2020, to May 27, 2021. Previously, he served as the Commanding General of the United States Army Tank-automotive and Armaments Command. Mitchell graduated from Princeville High School in 1981. He subsequently attended the United States Military Academy where he played Division I rugby and graduated with a B.S. degree in mechanical engineering in 1985. He later earned master's degrees from the Naval Postgraduate School and the Army War College.

Military offices
Preceded by Jason T. Evans as Deputy Commanding General for Support	Director of Operations, Plans, and Training of the United States Army Installation Management Command; 2015–2017	Succeeded by ???
Preceded by Steven A. Shapiro	Deputy Chief of Staff for Logistics and Operations of the United States Army Materiel Command; 2017–2018	Succeeded by Rodney D. Fogg
Preceded by Clark W. LeMasters Jr.	Commanding General of the United States Army Tank-automotive and Armaments Command; 2018–2020	Succeeded by Darren L. Werner
Preceded by Steven A. Shapiro	Commanding General of the United States Army Sustainment Command; 2020–2021	Succeeded by Matt Sannito; Acting
