= Kenneth Mitchell (cricketer) =

English cricketer

Cricket information
- Batting: Left-handed

Career statistics
Competition	First-class
Matches	1
Runs scored	10
Batting average	5.00
100s/50s	0/0
Top score	10
Catches/stumpings	1/0
- Source: Cricinfo, 16 August 2022

Kenneth James Mitchell (5 December 1924 – 14 December 1986) was an English first-class cricketer who played a single first-class match, for Worcestershire against Nottinghamshire at New Road in 1946. Batting at four, he made 0 and 10. He also took one catch, to dismiss Tom Reddick.

Mitchell was born in Old Hill, which was then in Staffordshire but is now in West Midlands.
