= Margaret J. Mitchell =

Margaret J. Mitchell (1869–1952) was an American writer, the dietician of Manhattan State Hospital, New York, and director of domestic science, Drexel Institute, Philadelphia. She subsequently worked at the Bruce School in New York.

She is the author of two books: The Fireless Cook Book: A Manual of the Construction and Use of Appliances for Cooking by Retained Heat, and Cereal Foods and Their Preparation. She presented her work on cereal foods at the 1909 Housekeepers' Conference. While working at the Bruce School, Mitchell authored articles that were syndicated in United States's newspapers.
