= Keith Mitchell (disambiguation) =

Keith Mitchell (born 1946) is a Grenadian politician.

Keith Mitchell may also refer to:

- Keith Mitchell (American football) (1974–2026), American football player
- Keith Mitchell (baseball) (born 1969), American former baseball player
- Keith Mitchell (golfer) (born 1992), American golfer
- Keith Paul Mitchell, search and rescue technician

== See also ==
- Keith Coogan (Keith Eric Mitchell, born 1970), American actor
- Keith Michell (1926–2015), Australian actor
