= Princeville High School =

Location
- 302 Cordis Avenue; Princeville, Illinois; United States; 40°55′55.5″N 89°45′10.1″W

Information
- Type: Public secondary
- Superintendent: Tony Shinall
- Principal: Rich Thole
- Teaching staff: 27.50 (FTE)
- Grades: 6–12
- Enrollment: 336 (2023-2024)
- Student to teacher ratio: 12.22
- Campus: Rural, fringe
- Colors: Maroon and white
- Athletics: Baseball, Softball, Football, Volleyball, Track & Field, Basketball, Cross Country, Golf
- Nickname: Princes
- Website: Princeville High School

Princeville High School (PHS) is a public four-year high school located at 302 Cordis Avenue in Princeville, a village in Peoria County, Illinois, in the Midwestern United States. PHS is part of Princeville Community Unit School District 326, which also includes Princeville Grade School and Princeville Junior High School. The campus is 16 miles northwest of Peoria, Illinois and serves a mixed village and rural residential community. It is the only high school in the village of Princeville, part of the Peoria metropolitan statistical area.

Princeville Junior High School shares the same campus as Princeville Senior High School.

== Athletics ==
Princeville High School competes in the Lincoln Trail Conference and is a member school in the Illinois High School Association. Its mascot is the Prince, symbolized by an armored knight and horse carrying a shield and jousting lance. Princeville has competed in the IHSA Final Four a total of three times in boys' football (finished second in 1975) and girls' softball (second in 2016, third in 2017). The school has no state championships on record in team athletics.
