= Dennis Mitchell (scholar) =

Dennis A. Mitchell is a Canadian-American university leader and scholar of dental medicine. He currently serves as Dean of the Columbia University College of Dental Medicine, a position to which he was appointed in October 2025 after having served as interim dean since February 2025. Dr. Mitchell has held a number of leadership and teaching roles at Columbia since 1991 including executive vice president for university life, senior vice provost for faculty advancement, and professor of dental medicine at Columbia University Irving Medical Center at Columbia University.

== Early life and education ==
On the advice of an uncle, Mitchell left Canada to study in the US, earning his degree in Neurobiology and Behavior from Cornell University. He subsequently attended Howard University’s College of Dentistry, earning a Doctor of Dental Surgery degree, and earned an MPH in Executive Health Services Management from Columbia University's Mailman School of Public Health.

== Career and research ==
After receiving a full-time appointment at Columbia University, he co-created and directed the Community DentCare Network, which seeks to address the lack of oral healthcare services in northern Manhattan.

In 2004, Mitchell became the Dean for Diversity and Inclusion for the College of Dental Medicine at Columbia. He then became Columbia's Vice Provost for Faculty Advancement. Mitchell's office is the steward of $185 million in publicly committed funds. In August 2021, Mitchell was appointed as the executive vice president for university life.

On October 22, 2025, Columbia announced Mitchell’s appointment as Dean of the Columbia University College of Dental Medicine and Senior Vice President of the Columbia University Irving Medical Center. In a statement announcing the appointment, acting university president Claire Shipman referred to Mitchell as “one of the nation’s leading dental administrators,” adding the following: “We can think of no one more qualified to serve as the next Dean of the College of Dental Medicine.”

Dr. Mitchell is the winner of the 2022 American Dental Education Association Distinguished Service Award.
