= Justice Mitchell =

Justice Mitchell may refer to:

- Burley Mitchell (born 1940), associate justice and chief justice of the North Carolina Supreme Court
- Joseph Mitchell (Indiana judge) (1837–1890), associate justice of the Supreme Court of Indiana
- John R. Mitchell (judge) (1861–1939), associate justice of the Washington Supreme Court
- Henry L. Mitchell (1831–1903), associate justice of the Florida Supreme Court
- James T. Mitchell (1834–1915), associate justice of the Supreme Court of Pennsylvania
- Richard F. Mitchell (1889–1969), associate justice of the Iowa Supreme Court
- Stephen Mix Mitchell (1743–1835), associate justice of the Connecticut Supreme Court
- Walter J. Mitchell (1871–1955), associate justice of the Maryland Court of Appeals
- William B. Mitchell (1832–1900), associate justice of the Minnesota Supreme Court

== See also ==
- Judge Mitchell (disambiguation)
