= Willie Mitchell =

Willie Mitchell is the name of:

- Willie Mitchell (American football) (born 1940), American former National Football League player
- Willie Mitchell (baseball) (1889–1973), American Major League Baseball player
- Willie Mitchell (basketball) (born 1975), American basketball player, former Mr. Basketball of Michigan
- Willie Mitchell (ice hockey) (born 1977), Canadian National Hockey League player
- Willie Mitchell (musician) (1928–2010), American musician and record producer

== See also ==
- William Mitchell (disambiguation)
