= Jeff Mitchell (disambiguation) =

Jeff Mitchell is the name of:

- Jeff Mitchell (born 1974), American professional football player
- Jeff Mitchell (golfer) (born 1954), American professional golfer and college golf coach
- Jeff Mitchell (ice hockey) (born 1975), NHL hockey player
- Jeffrey Mitchell (actor) in Naked Amazon
- Geoff Mitchell in 1991 CFL draft
- Geoffrey Mitchell (conductor) and chorister
