= Thomas Mitchell (scholar) =

English classical scholar (1783–1845)

Thomas Mitchell (1783–1845) was an English classical scholar. Educated at Christ's Hospital, he went to Pembroke College, Cambridge, with one of the school exhibitions, and proceeded B.A. in 1806 and M.A in 1809. He was also a fellow of Sidney Sussex College, Cambridge, from 1809 to 1818. He translated the plays of Aristophanes into English verse, 1820–28, and edited the Greek texts of Aristophanes, 1834–3, and Sophocles, 1843.

== Life ==
Thomas Mitchell, born in London on 30 May 1783, was son of Alexander Mitchell, riding master, successively of Hamilton Place and Grosvenor Place, London. In June 1790 he was admitted to Christ's Hospital, and in October 1802 went to Pembroke College, Cambridge, with one of the hospital exhibitions. In 1806 he graduated B.A. as eighth senior optime and was first chancellor's medallist. By reason of a novel regulation, which enacted that not more than two students educated at the same school should be fellows of the college at one time, he was refused a fellowship at Pembroke, greatly to his disappointment, as he could have held it without taking orders. In 1809 he proceeded M.A. and was elected to an open fellowship at Sidney Sussex, which he had to vacate in 1812 on account of his refusal to be ordained. He supported himself by private tuition and literary work.

From 1806 to 1816 he was tutor successively in the families of Sir George Henry Rose, Robert Smith (whose son, afterwards the Right Hon. Vernon Smith, was his favourite pupil), and Thomas Hope. In 1810 he was introduced to William Gifford, and in 1813 he commenced a series of articles in the Quarterly Review on Aristophanes and Athenian manners, the success of which subsequently induced him to undertake his verse translation, which Gordon Goodwin calls "spirited and accurate", of Aristophanes's comedies of the Acharnians, Knights, Clouds, and Wasps (2 vols., 1820–2). He declined soon afterwards a vacant Greek chair in Scotland, on account of his objection to sign the confession of the Scotch kirk. In June 1813 Leigh Hunt invited him to dinner in Horsemonger Lane gaol, along with Byron and Moore. Byron afterwards spoke of his translation of Aristophanes as "excellent".

For the last twenty years of his life Mitchell resided with his relatives in Oxfordshire, occasionally superintending the publication of the Greek authors by the Clarendon Press. During 1834–8 he edited in separate volumes for John Murray the Acharnians (1835), Wasps (1835), Knights (1836), Clouds (1838), and Frogs (1839) of Aristophanes, with English notes. This edition was adversely criticised by the Rev. George John Kennedy, fellow of St. John's College, Cambridge, and Mitchell published a reply to Kennedy in 1841. His Preliminary Discourse was republished in vol. xiii. of Philippus Invernizi's edition of Aristophanes, 1826.

In 1839 he entered into an engagement with John Henry Parker, publisher, of Oxford, to edit Sophocles, but after the publication of three plays in 1842, Parker suspended the edition on the ground that schoolmasters objected to the diffuseness of English notes. Mitchell, left without regular employment, fell into straitened circumstances, but was granted by Sir Robert Peel 150l. from the royal bounty. In 1843 Parker resumed his publication of Sophocles, and Mitchell edited the remaining four plays, with shorter notes than before, and in 1844 he began a school edition of a Pentalogia Aristophanica, with brief Latin notes. He had nearly completed this task when he died suddenly of apoplexy, on 4 May 1845, at his house at Steeple Aston, near Woodstock. He was unmarried.

== Works ==
Mitchell also published indexes to Reiske's edition of the Oratores Attici (2 vols. 8vo, Oxford, 1828), Isocrates (8vo, Oxford, 1828), and Plato (2 vols. 8vo, Oxford, 1832).

In the British Library are Mitchell's copiously annotated copies of Æschylus, Euripides, Aristophanes, and Bekker's edition of the Oratores Attici.

== Sources ==
- Goodwin, Gordon; Smail, Richard (2004). "Mitchell, Thomas (1783–1845), classical scholar". Oxford Dictionary of National Biography (online ed.). Oxford University Press. doi:10.1093/ref:odnb/18851. (Subscription, Wikipedia Library access or UK public library membership required.)
- Lockhart, Arthur William, ed. (1876). List of University Exhibitioners, 1566–1875. Christ's Hospital, London. pp. 18, 19.
- Moore, Thomas (1844). Life of Lord Byron, with His Letters and Journals, and Illustrative Notes. London: John Murray. pp. 183, 455.

Attribution:

- This article incorporates text from a publication now in the public domain: Goodwin, Gordon (1894). "Mitchell, Thomas (1743-1845)". In Lee, Sidney (ed.). Dictionary of National Biography. Vol. 38. London: Smith, Elder & Co. p. 73.
