= Billy Mitchell (footballer, born 1910) =

Irish footballer

Personal information
- Full name: William Mitchell
- Date of birth: 22 November 1910
- Place of birth: Lurgan, Ireland
- Date of death: 30 November 1977 (aged 67)
- Height: 5 ft 5 1/2 in (1.66 m)
- Position: Half-back

Youth career
- Linfield Rangers

Senior career*
Years	Team	Apps	(Gls)
1928–1929	Cliftonville		
1929–1933	Lisburn Distillery		
1933–1940	Chelsea	108	(2)
1943–1945	Bristol City		
1945–1947	Bath City		

International career
1931–1937	Ireland	15	(0)
- * Club domestic league appearances and goals

William Mitchell (22 November 1910 – 30 November 1977) was an Irish footballer who played as a half-back.

== Club career ==
Mitchell played as a half-back for Chelsea, amassing 108 league appearances and two goals.

== International career ==
Mitchell was an international footballer for the Ireland national football team.
