= Betty Mitchell =

Betty Mitchell may refer to:

- Betty Mitchell (theatre director) (1896–1976), American-born Canadian theatre director and educator
- Betty Lou Mitchell (born 1937), American politician
- Bessie Guthrie (1905–1977), Australian designer, publisher, feminist and activist born Bessie Jean Thompson Mitchell
