= Daráine Mulvihill =

Irish television personality

Daráine Mulvihill (Irish: Daráine Ní Mhaolmhichil) (born c. 1983) is an Irish television personality.

== Biography ==
Daráine Mulvihill is the daughter of Liam Mulvihill, the former director general of the Gaelic Athletic Association (GAA). She is from Ashbourne, County Meath, and has two younger brothers. A survivor of meningitis, she lost both her legs due to the illness when she was 16. She was so ill she was not expected to live and was given last rites. She has been an advocate for immunization.

Mulvihill graduated in Communications Studies at Dublin City University.

She was voted a (Irish) People of the Year Award in 2001 because of her personal story and attitude. Daráine was appointed to the Irish Council of State by Mary McAleese for her second term as President of Ireland, starting in 2004.

In August–September 2012, Mulvihill was part of the UK Channel 4 TV presenting for the London 2012 Paralympics, presenting the Morning show programme. and had been researching for the role since the beginning of the year. Commenting on her job she said "Having gone through something similar to the athletes and living a life that faces up to some of the same challenges as them, I do think I have a natural affinity that other journalists might not have." Mulvihill also presented coverage of the Rio 2016 Paralympics for RTÉ Two Television. In 2017 she was part of the BBC team covering the Invictus Games from Toronto.
