= Kenny Mitchell (footballer) =

English footballer (1957–2019)

Personal information
- Full name: Kenneth Mitchell
- Date of birth: 26 May 1957
- Place of birth: Sunderland, England
- Date of death: 4 September 2019 (aged 62)
- Height: 6 ft 0 in (1.83 m)
- Position: Defender

Youth career
- –: Newcastle United

Senior career*
Years	Team	Apps	(Gls)
1975–1981	Newcastle United	66	(2)
1978	→ Morton (loan)	3	(0)
1978	→ Tulsa Roughnecks (loan)	3	(0)
1981–1982	Darlington	13	(1)
1982–1983	Workington		
1984–1985	Kuusysi	42	(0)
1986	Finnairin Palloilijat	17	(0)
1986	Gateshead	7	(0)
1987	Kuusysi	21	(1)
1988	Lapuan Virkiä	13	(2)
- * Club domestic league appearances and goals

Kenneth Mitchell (26 May 1957 – 4 September 2019) was an English footballer who played in the Football League for Newcastle United and Darlington, in the North American Soccer League for the Tulsa Roughnecks, in the Scottish League for Morton, and in the Finnish leagues for Kuusysi, FinnPa and Lapuan Virkiä. With Kuusysi, he won the Finnish league title in 1984, reached the quarter-final of the 1985–86 European Cup, and won the 1987 Finnish Cup. He also played non-league football for clubs including Workington and Gateshead.

== Life and career ==
Mitchell was born in Sunderland. He began his football career as an apprentice with Newcastle United, and made his senior debut on 16 February 1977 at home to Manchester City in the First Division. City took a 2–0 lead, but Newcastle reduced the deficit after an hour, and with six minutes left, City goalkeeper Joe Corrigan mishit a goal kick straight to Mitchell, 30 yards (27 m) from goal, who set up Micky Burns to score the equaliser. In stoppage time, "there was the poignant sight of Kenny Mitchell, a 19-year-old making his first appearance, angrily chastising himself for screwing the ball wide from a good position". He kept his place for the next two games, and on his second appearance of the 1977–78 season, he scored his first senior goal, the second in Newcastle's 4–0 defeat of Wolverhampton Wanderers on 17 December 1977. After two outings in the FA Cup in January, Mitchell spent a month on loan at Scottish club Morton. He played twice as a substitute in the Scottish Cup and started three league matches, all without scoring; Morton went on to win the 1977–78 First Division title and with it promotion to the Premier Division.

On his return to Newcastle, Mitchell came into the first team for the last few matches of the season. On 12 April, he was sent off for arguing with the referee after opponents West Bromwich Albion went two goals up, as Newcastle headed for relegation to the Second Division. After the end of the English season, Mitchell went to the United States where he played three times for NASL team the Tulsa Roughnecks. For the new campaign in the Second Division, Mitchell was a regular member of the first team, but as a midfielder and later as a defender rather than the forward positions he occupied at the higher level. He played only six times in 1979–80, returned to regular selection in the first half of the following season, and made his 72nd and final Newcastle appearance on 27 December 1980 in a 2–0 home defeat to Derby County.

In August 1981, Mitchell signed for Fourth Division club Darlington. He played 12 times in the League, scoring once, and after a spell with Northern Premier League club Workington, he moved on to football in Finland. He was a member of the Kuusysi team that won the 1984 Mestaruussarja (Finnish league) and reached the quarter-final of the 1985–86 European Cup, though he had left the club before that round was played. He spent the 1986 season with Finnairin Palloilijat playing in the second tier, returning to England for a few months with Conference club Gateshead. Mitchell then went back to Finland for another two seasons, initially returning to Kuusysi, with whom he won the 1987 Finnish Cup. He would see out the remainder of his career with third-tier side Lapuan Virkiä. In 1988, Mitchell and former Kuusysi teammate Kevin Todd played for Humbledon Plains Farm in the FA Sunday Cup final.

Mitchell died on 4 September 2019.
