= Dennis Mitchell (RAF officer) =

Sir Dennis Mitchell
- Military career
- Allegiance: United Kingdom
- Branch: Royal Air Force
- Service years: 1940–1966
- Rank: Air Commodore
- Commands: No. 26 Squadron RAF
- Conflicts: Second World War
- Awards: Knight Commander of the Order of the British Empire, Commander of the Royal Victorian Order, Distinguished Flying Cross, Air Force Cross

Air Commodore Sir Arthur Dennis Mitchell KBE CVO DFC AFC (26 May 1918 – 25 December 2001) was a British military pilot and commander.

Dennis Mitchell was educated at Bloxham School and Pangbourne College before becoming an air cadet at RAF Cranwell ad commissioning into the Royal Air Force. He flew multiple missions during the Second World War in the Far East and Europe. During the post-war 1940s Mitchell served at No 2 Group headquarters, British Air Forces of Occupation, No 84 Group and the Air Ministry, before learning to fly the Gloster Meteor, the RAF's first jet fighter.

Following brief command of No. 26 Squadron RAF, a Hawker Tempest squadron in Germany, he was posted to Brussels in 1948 as a member of an RAF delegation responsible for determining the needs of the future Belgian Air Force. In this period Mitchell met and married Comtesse Mireill Cornet de Ways Ruart.

He was decorated on several occasions, most notably being awarded a DFC and Bar in 1944 for his courageous leadership of squadrons under his command in the north-west Europe Campaign. From 1956 to 1959, he was Deputy Captain of the Queen's Flight and Captain from 1962 to 1964. In 1958, Mitchell was appointed Aide-de-Camp to Elizabeth II; he had been extra equerry since 1962. Mitchell was appointed KBE in 1977 and CVO in 1961. He was awarded the AFC in 1943 and French Croix de Guerre in 1945.

Mitchell died in 2001.
