= Sister Angelica (film) =

1954 film

- Spanish: Sor Angélica
- Directed by: Joaquín Luis Romero Marchent
- Written by: Francisco Gargallo; Joaquín Luis Romero Marchent
- Produced by: Ignacio F. Iquino
- Starring: Tilda Thamar; Marion Mitchell; Barta Barri
- Cinematography: Pablo Ripoll
- Edited by: Ramon Quadreny
- Music by: Augusto Algueró
- Production company: IFI Producción
- Distributed by: IFISA
- Release date: 25 October 1954
- Running time: 100 minutes
- Country: Spain
- Language: Spanish

Sister Angelica (Spanish: Sor Angélica) is a 1954 Spanish drama film directed by Joaquín Luis Romero Marchent and starring Tilda Thamar, Marion Mitchell and Barta Barri.

== Cast ==
- Josep Maria Angelat
- Mercedes Barranco
- Barta Barri
- Mario Bustos
- Manuel Gas
- Miguel Gila
- Luis Induni
- Marion Mitchell
- Rosa Moragas
- Jaime Paloma
- Rafael Romero Marchent
- Tilda Thamar
- Fernando Vallejo
