= Attorney General Mitchell =

Attorney General Mitchell may refer to:

- Bob Mitchell (Saskatchewan politician) (1936–2016), Attorney General of Saskatchewan
- David Brydie Mitchell (1760–1837), Attorney General of Georgia
- Henry Mitchell (Irish judge) (died 1384), Attorney General for Ireland
- John H. Mitchell (Iowa Attorney General) (1899–1992), Attorney General of Iowa
- John N. Mitchell (1913–1988), Attorney General of the United States
- Samuel James Mitchell (1852–1926), Attorney General of South Australia
- Tom Mitchell (Australian politician) (1906–1984), Attorney-General of Victoria
- William D. Mitchell (1874–1955), Attorney General of the United States
