= Robert de La Berge =

Early French colonist in North America (1638–1712)

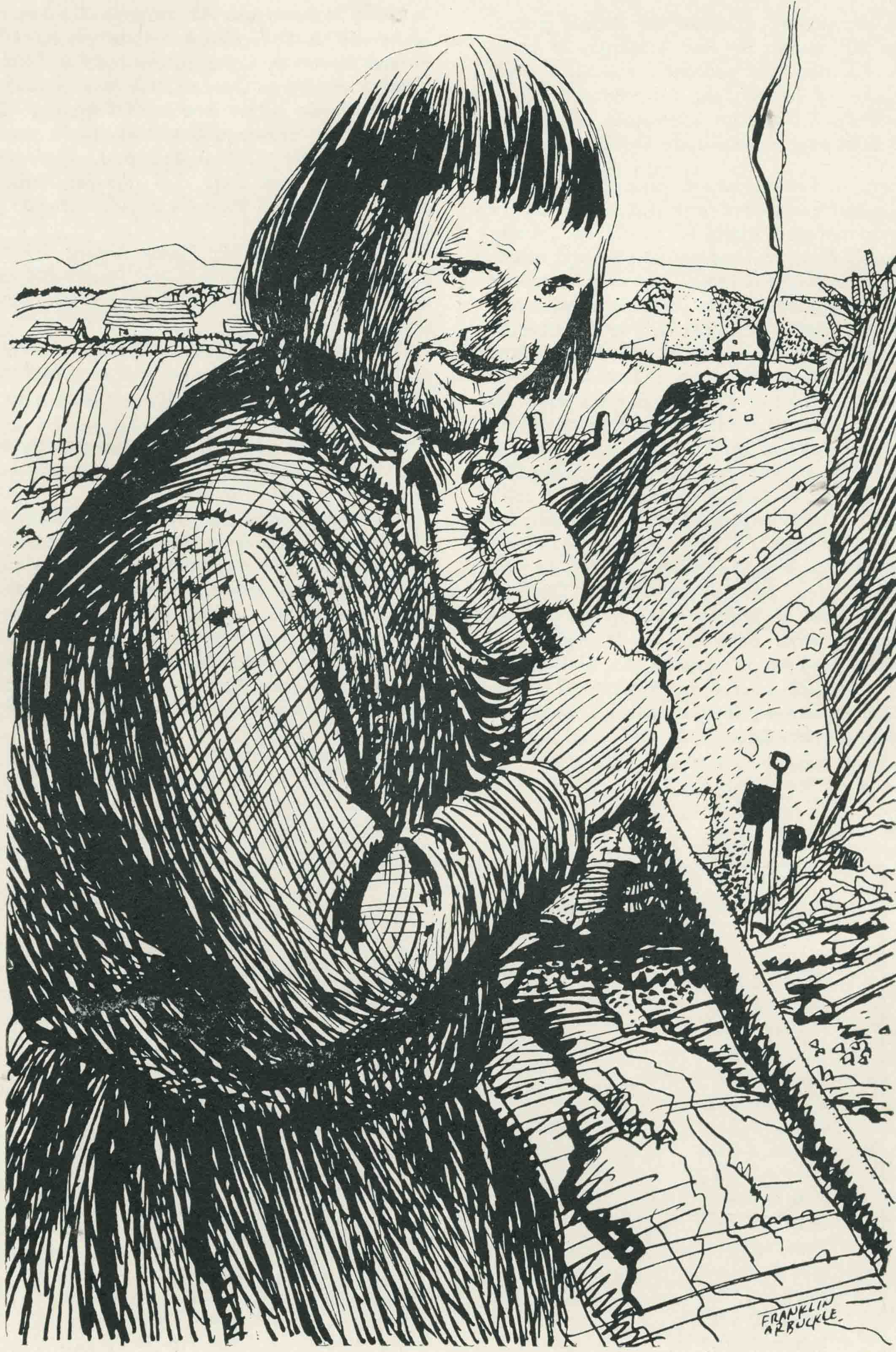
Robert de La Berge

Robert de La Berge (1638–1712) was one of the original colonists to settle in New France in 1658, and became one of the early industrialists in the area.

== Early life and journey to America ==
Robert de La Berge was born on May 24, 1638, in Colomby-sur-Thaon, Normandy, France, in what is now the department of Calvados. Robert was the son of Jacques de la Berge and Marie Poitevin who were married on May 8, 1636, in Colomby-sur-Thaon. Marie Poitevin was the widow of Jacques Touchet and had a son, Thomas, from that marriage. Jacques and Marie had two other sons: Abraham (born 2 September 1640) and Guillaume (born 15 February 1643). Abraham and Guillaume remained in France.

Thomas Touchet, a carpenter by trade, had spent the years from 1650 to 1653 in New France. When he returned to New France in 1658, he took his half-brother Robert with him. Robert went to New France as a labourer, under a three-year contract to work for a man named Massé Gravel in Château-Richer. Under the terms of the contract, Robert received a cash advance, an annual salary, and a guaranteed return trip to France. Robert arrived in New France aboard the ship Taureau on August 6, 1658.

In 1661, Robert completed his three-year obligation to Massé Gravel, but instead of returning to France, he received a concession of land in Château-Richer. In the October 1662, after a year of hard work, Robert sold the land to Charles Pouliot. Robert was apparently discouraged and intended to return to France. During the winter, Robert must have changed his mind. On February 4, 1663, Robert received a concession of land in the parish of Sainte-Famille.

At about this same time, Nicolas Durand and his wife Françoise Gausse dit Le Borgne were living on a farm in Château-Richer (which would later become L'Ange-Gardien) with their infant daughter, Marie-Ursule. Nicolas had received the land as a concession from Olivier Le Tardif and built a wood house with a stone chimney on it. That is the east side of Maison Laberge today. Françoise Gausse was the daughter of Maurice Gausse and Marguerite Blay of Noyon, Picardy, France. In late March 1663, Nicolas Durand died suddenly. The register stated that he "tué _____ sans pouvoir recvoir aucun sacrement" where a blank was left. It meant that he "died ____without being able to receive the sacraments." Did the registrar not know how he died, or did he not want to report it? That was abridged to say "S'est tué accidentellement dans son désert" where the word "desert" has multiple meanings. He could have died accidentally on his land in the "wilderness" cutting down trees; however, that would have been in the dead of winter. He could have also possibly died in the "desert" of his despair. We may never know. Unfortunately, his widow and young daughter were left to fend for themselves.

After only two months of widowhood, Françoise married Robert LaBerge on May 28, 1663, in Château-Richer. Françoise probably knew Robert from his earlier years in Château-Richer. Robert sold his property in Sainte-Famille and took up residence on the Durand farm in Château-Richer.

In the years that followed, Robert became a respected citizen. He participated in the election of the first three church wardens of L'Ange-Gardien. Records of his business transactions indicate that Robert prospered financially in New France. Robert was one of the early industrialists in the area. Sometime before 1674, Robert installed furnaces which were used for the manufacturing of lime. It was later expanded in 1692 for the retirement of Robert & Françoise and then again in 1791. Maison Laberge remained in the Laberge family until 1970 when it was sold to Jacques Gagnon. In 2011, Philip LaBerge purchased it and brought it back into the family. It is one of the oldest buildings in Canada. Maison Laberge is located at 14, rue Adrien Laberge, L'Ange-Gardien, Quebec, QC G0A 2K0.

The LaBerge household also grew over the years. Robert and Françoise had six children:

- Geneviève LaBerge was born on 22 April 1664 and was baptized the following day.
- Françoise LaBerge died a few days after her birth and was buried in Château-Richer on 6 February 1666.
- Catherine LaBerge was baptized on 15 September 1667. In 1687 she married Guillaume Maroist. In 1702 he purchased the western portion of the Laberge property from Nicolas who had received it as his inheritance. The 30th prime minister of Québec, Mme Pauline Marois, is a direct descendant of Guillaume Maroist.
- François LaBerge was born on 12 June 1669.
- Nicolas LaBerge was baptized on 29 February 1672. In 1702, Nicolas sold his property mentioned above, left his wife and children and went to help establish a tannery at present day Cairo, Illinois. After an epidemic broke out, he continued down the Mississippi to Mobile where he arrived in 1705. He was in the 1711 census and one of the very earliest inhabitants of French Louisiana.
- Guillaume LaBerge was born on 30 April 1674. In 1702, Guillaume had signed a contract to farm at Fort Pontchartrain du Detroit but did not leave most likely because of the lawsuit with Marie Ursule Durand mentioned below was resolved.

Robert was involved in a near-fatal accident during a trip to Québec. The event which took place prior to 1667 was recorded by Father Thomas Morel as follows:

Charles François, Michel Haynault and Robert de La Berge, all inhabitants of Beaupré, finding themselves on the water, going to Québec during bad weather, were seized by a great wind and by so furious a storm that their boat capsized, which obliged them, seeing themselves in danger of losing their life, to call upon Ste. Anne and make her a vow, following which they received a particular help, having been led to land, from where help had come to them, attributing their deliverance to this great Saint, which they assure and proved by coming to give thanks in her Church where I was fulfilling the duties of curate in the capacity of missionary.

== Later life and death ==
Monument to the first colonists of L'Ange-Gardien.

LaBerge became embroiled in a legal dispute with his stepdaughter, Marie-Ursule Durande, that lasted for five years before finally being resolved. On March 22, 1694, Robert obtained a receipt for 600 pounds from Marie-Ursule and her husband, Antoine Huppé dit Lagrois. This receipt was in return for the 600 pounds stipulated in her marriage contract and granted the entire property in L'Ange-Gardien to Robert.

Later, in 1697, Robert sold a half acre to his son Guillaume. In 1697, Robert sold most of the remaining property to his sons, Nicolas and Guillaume. It was after these transactions, in 1698, that Marie-Ursule and her husband filed a petition with Sovereign Council seeking to have their marriage contract declared null and void and to renounce their inheritances. Marie-Ursule alleged that she was short-changed on her inheritance by Robert and Françoise who underestimated the value of her father's estate. She also alleged that she was a victim of her stepfather's greed and that he had attempted to marry her off at the age of 12 to a simpleton. She stated that her marriage to Antoine Huppé freed her from the slavery and abuses of her stepfather, Robert. The Court initially decided in favour of Marie-Ursule. Robert and Françoise appealed and the decision was overturned on August 20, 1703 and all of Marie-Ursule's claims were dismissed.

Robert LaBerge lived to the age of 74. His son, François, took care of him during his last years. Robert was found dead in his bed on the morning of April 12, 1712. He died at the home of Guillaume Boucher, the father-in-law of his son, François. Robert was buried in Château-Richer on the same day.

Françoise Gausse died at the home of her daughter, Marie-Ursule Durant, in Beauport. She was buried on 8 March 1714. The burial records gave her age as 80 years.

== De La Berge surname and notable descendants ==
Robert was the first to arrive in North America with his surname. Most people today with the La Berge surname, and its variants, in North America trace their family roots back to him. While there are currently many Laberges in L'Ange-Gardien, where Maison Laberge is located, many Laberges migrated to Montreal and the town of Châteauguay, just south of it.

Captain Joseph LaBarge (1815–1899) - Joseph LaBarge of St. Louis, Missouri, was one of the most famous of the Mississippi river boat captains. He transported people and goods up and down the Mississippi and Missouri rivers. According to an 1898 newspaper article, Captain LaBarge was the man who taught Mark Twain about the Mississippi River. His illustrious life is documented in the book, History of Early Steamboat Navigation on the Missouri River: Life and Adventures of Joseph LaBarge by Hiram M. Chittenden.

Joseph Marie LaBerge (1787–1860) - The father of famed riverboat captain, Joseph LaBarge, Joseph Marie LaBarge Sr. was born at l'Assomption, Quebec, on July 4, 1787. In about 1808, he emigrated to St. Louis in a birch-bark canoe, travelling through various waterways to reach the Mississippi River. LaBarge served in the War of 1812 and was wounded in the battle of the River Raisin. In this battle, LaBarge lost two fingers from a gunshot and was scarred for life from a tomahawk wound to the head. He became a naturalized citizen following his service in the Army. For several years he was involved in the manufacture of charcoal and later owned a hotel and livery in St. Louis. He is probably best known for his exploits as a fur trapper in the far west. Several geographical landmarks such as LaBarge (or Battle) Creek and the city of La Barge, Wyoming, were named in his honor. These took their name from a battle with Indians in which LaBarge took part. Details of this event have been lost, however. LaBarge was also present in General Ashley's disastrous fight with the Aricara Indians on the Missouri River in 1823, and was the man who cut the cable of one of the keelboats so that it might drift out of range of the fire of the Indians. In January 1860, while on his way to visit an ill relative, LaBarge slipped on an icy St. Louis sidewalk and struck the curb. He died from his injuries two days later on January 22, 1860. (Further details of Joseph Marie LaBarge's life are contained in Hiram Martin Chittenden's book, History of Early Steamboat Navigation on the Missouri River: Life and Adventures of Joseph LaBarge, published by Ross & Haines, 1962.)

Mia LaBerge (born 1967) is an American artist who painted the first Steinway Art Case Piano created to honor a university. In 2006, LaBerge was commissioned to paint the Madison Bluestone Art Case Piano which celebrates the hundredth anniversary of James Madison University and also recognizes its status as Virginia’s first All-Steinway Music School. The Madison Bluestone was among the last Art Case pianos with which Henry Z. Steinway (1915-2008), the National Medal of Arts winner and last of the long line of Steinway family members to be president of Steinway & Sons, had direct involvement. The piano was exhibited in the rotunda of New York City's Steinway Hall and was ceremonially unveiled on stage at the Kennedy Center in Washington, DC. Steinway kept LaBerge unofficially "on call" to paint scenic music stands for the company's Madison Century series of limited-edition pianos. Circa 1990-2005, LaBerge's oil paintings were primarily realistic or painterly-realistic. Her art work from 2006 and later became ever more abstract—finally moving toward nonobjective subject matter.

LaBerge had minor gallery representation in Philadelphia and elsewhere, but from 2003 to 2008 she preferred to interact directly with prospective patrons by self-exhibiting at juried art festivals in the parks and streets of Chicago, Tampa, Madison, Norfolk, Philadelphia, and Richmond. Artist Terry Ward was LaBerge's roadie and occasional studio assistant at the time. In 2009 she ceased traveling for maternity leave. A distant descendant of the LaBerges after whom Lake Laberge was named, Minneapolis-born Laberge is an alumna of Virginia Commonwealth University and of James Madison University. She supplemented college studies in art with museum-study trips to the Louvre in Paris, Metropolitan Museum of Art in New York, and with frequent trips the National Gallery of Art. Her paintings have appeared in the coffee table book Virginia's Cattle Story : The First 400 Years (ISBN 0975274511) and on the cover of youth textbook All About You : A Course in Character for Teens (ISBN 0-9710966-0-0) . At least one LaBerge painting is in the collection of former US President Jimmy Carter.

Dr. Walter LaBerge - (1924–2004). Born in Chicago, Illinois, Dr. Walter B. LaBerge had a distinguished career in the field of aerospace engineering which encompasses over 20 years in private industry and over 20 years in service to the U.S. Government. During World War II, he was "skipper" of YMS 165 in the Pacific and served as Technical Director of the Naval Ordnance Test Station in China Lake, California. Dr. LaBerge was appointed to the positions of Assistant Secretary of the Air Force, Assistant Secretary General of NATO, and Under Secretary of the Army. In private industry, he was a Corporate Vice-President for Lockheed Corporation and Vice-President of Philco-Ford. During his career, Dr. LaBerge led an industrial team which designed and built the NASA Mission Control Center in Houston and was a principal participant on a government team which designed the Sidewinder missile. Dr. LaBerge was a member of the National Academy of Engineering and was a former chairman and member of the Army Science Board. He served as an adjunct professor at the University of Texas at Austin. Dr. LaBerge died on July 16, 2004. See Dr. Walter LaBerge bio. Walter's son Philip is the current owner of Maison Laberge.

Margaret Wade Labarge (1916–2009) was a Canadian historian and author specializing in the role of women in the Middle Ages. She was the adjunct professor of history at Carleton University.

Bernie LaBarge (born Ottawa, Ontario, on March 11, 1953) - Bernie started playing guitar at age 11 (1964) and began playing professionally in 1967. He was the frontman and/or guitarist for many popular bands in Ontario and nominated for Most Promising Male Vocalist at 1984 Juno Awards for his album entitled "Barging In" (Sony). Bernie has also been a sideman on over 100 albums and has toured or recorded with The Irish Rovers, Kim Mitchell, Frank Byner of Tower of Power, Long John Baldry, Doug Riley, Cassandra Vasik, Joel Feeney. He has composed and performed on many North American and worldwide commercial jingles. Bernie won the Canadian Songwriting Contest in 1986 (Best R&B Song category) and many top Canadian and International performers have covered his songs. Currently Toronto-based, Bernie is the lead guitarist for The Dexters, David Clayton-Thomas, and Danny B and the R&B All-Stars.

David LaBerge was born in 1929 in St. Louis, Missouri. He received his undergraduate degree from the College of Wooster, and his MA and PhD degrees from Claremont University and Stanford University, respectively. Dr. LaBerge formerly taught at Indiana University, Bloomington, University of Minnesota, and University of California at Irvine from 1955 until 1997. He was also a member of the adjunct faculty in psychology and biology at Simon's Rock College of Bard from 1997-2007. He is now a visiting scholar at the University of Washington, Seattle. Specializing in the attention process, he has conducted experiments using response-time methods of cognitive psychology and brain imagining methods of neurobiology.

Arthur LaBerge was a member of the Legislative Assembly of Quebec from 1956 to 1960. He served as a representative of Châteauguay for the Union Nationale. The 25th Legislative Assembly of Quebec was the Quebec, Canada provincial political legislature that existed from June 20, 1956, and June 22, 1960. The Union Nationale was the governing party for the fourth consecutive mandate. He served under Maurice Duplessis last term as Premier of Quebec.

Stephen LaBerge (born 1947) is a psychophysiologist and a leader in the scientific study of lucid dreaming. In 1967 he received his bachelor's degree in mathematics. He began researching lucid dreaming for his Ph.D. in psychophysiology at Stanford University, which he received in 1980. He developed techniques to enable himself and other researchers to enter a lucid dream state at will, most notably the MILD technique (mnemonic induction of lucid dreams), which was necessary for many forms of dream experimentation. In 1987, he founded The Lucidity Institute, an organization that promotes research into lucid dreaming, as well as running courses for the general public on how to achieve a lucid dream. His technique of signalling to a collaborator monitoring his EEG with agreed-upon eye movements during REM became the first published, scientifically-verified signal from a dreamer's mind to the outside world. The first confirmed signal came from Alan Worsley under study in England; however his group did not publish their results until later. Though the technique is simple, it opens broad new avenues of dream research and pushed the field of dream research, or oneirology, beyond its protoscientific and largely discredited psychoanalytic roots, establishing it as a fruitful and respectable discipline.

Édouard Laberge (August 21, 1829 – August 22, 1883) was a physician and political figure in Quebec. He represented Châteauguay in the Legislative Assembly of Quebec from 1867 to 1882 as a Liberal. He was born in Sainte-Philomène, Lower Canada, the son of François Laberge and Appoline Brault. Laberge was educated at the collège de Montréal and McGill University. He qualified to practise as a doctor in 1856 and set up practice at Sainte-Philomène. In 1862, he married Nathalie Poulin. Laberge died in office at Sainte-Philomène at the age of 54.

Louis Laberge, PQ (February 18, 1924 – July 19, 2002) was a French Canadian labour union leader. He was president of the Fédération des travailleurs du Québec (Quebec Federation of Labour). In 1988, he was made an Officer of the National Order of Quebec. A state funeral was held at Montreal's Mary, Queen of the World Cathedral.
