= Spread Eagle (steamboat) =

American steamboat

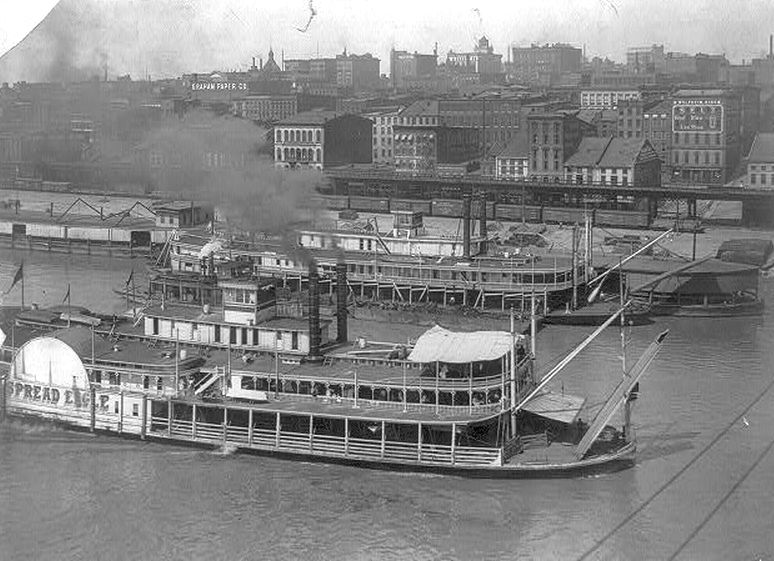

The Spread Eagle was a steam-driven sidewheel riverboat that transported passengers, goods and supplies to the forts and trading posts along the Missouri River between 1857 and 1864. It was constructed and launched at Brownsville, Pennsylvania. The vessel was a wooden hull packet, 210 feet (64 m) long, with a beam of 36 feet (11 m), a draft of 6 feet (1.8 m), and was rated at 389 tons. It was powered by two steam engines with 3 boilers each, at 40 inches (1,000 mm) in diameter and 24 feet (7.3 m) in length. The Spread Eagle was constructed by Captain Benjamin Johnson who sold the vessel to the American Fur Company upon her arrival at Saint Louis, Missouri. Commanded by captain Bailey, she was once engaged in a race along the Missouri from St. Louis to Fort Benton where she rammed her opponent.

== Service ==
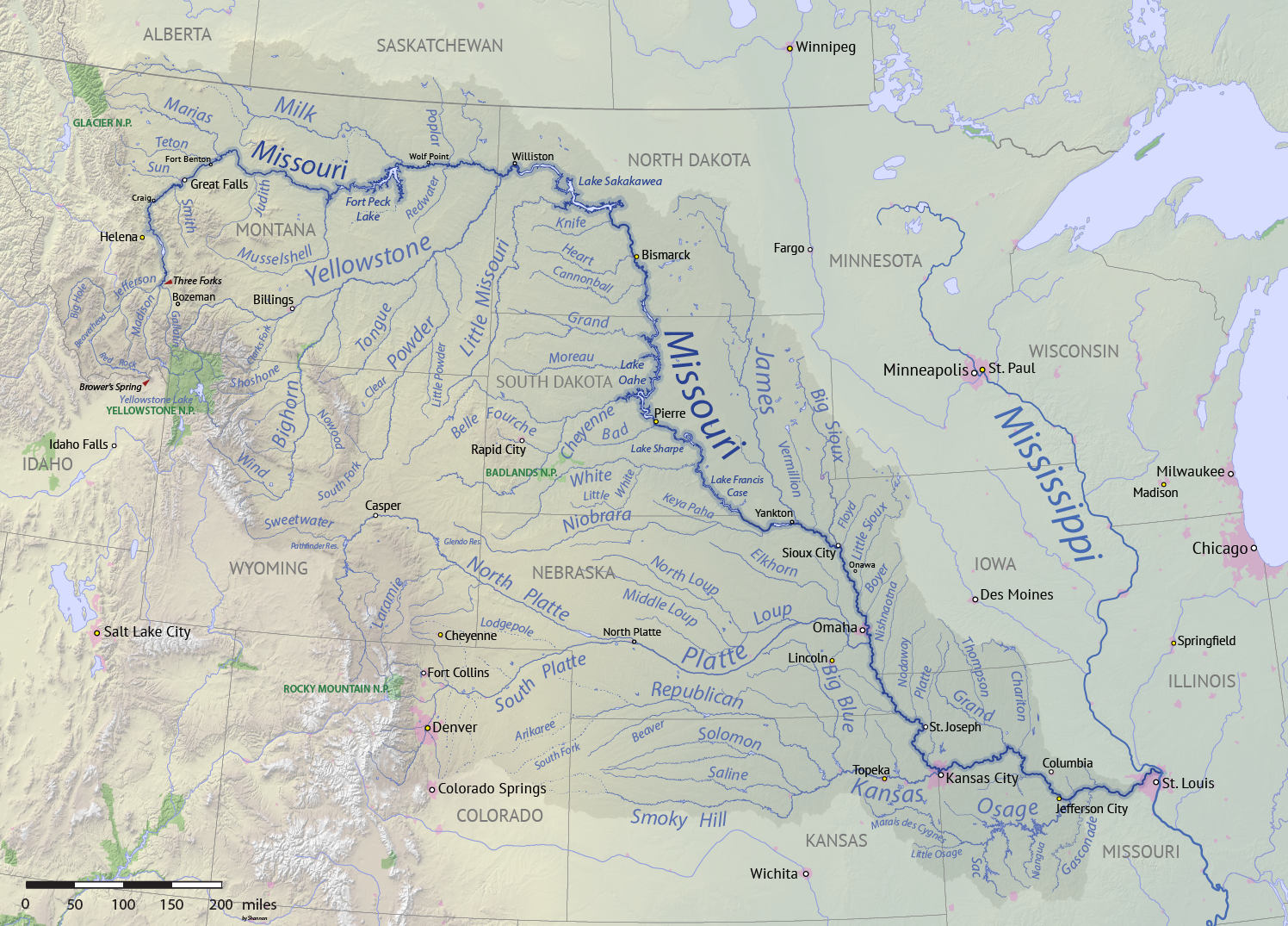
Missouri River

Spread Eagle carried goods and plied trade from Saint Louis to Omaha, Nebraska and Council Bluffs, Iowa. On June 6, 1862, it raced against Captain LaBarge's Emilie on the upper Missouri River from moorings near Fort Berthold in the Dakota Territory.

In early 1859 the American Fur Company sent two vessels up the Missouri River, commanded by Joseph LaBarge and his brother, John, with its annual outfit of men and supplies. The Company employed its newly acquired riverboat, the Spread Eagle, and a chartered riverboat, called the Chippewa. The Chippewa was a much lighter vessel, and her owner, Captain Crabtree, was contracted to reach Fort Benton, or as far past this point as was possible. At Fort Union Crabtree defaulted in his contract and the Chippewa was sold to the company for the sum about equal to its charter price. At this time, freight from the Spread Eagle was transferred to the Chippewa.

The Spread Eagle was commanded by Captain LaBarge, while his brother, John, assumed command of the Chippewa. On July 17, 1859, the Chippewa successfully made her way to within fifteen miles (24 km) of Fort Benton, and unloaded her cargo at Brule bottom, where Fort McKenzie had once stood. This vessel managed to reach a point further from the sea by river navigation than any other boat had up to this time.

== Race with the Emilie ==
The Spread Eagle was owned by the American Fur Company, (Note: Owned by the famous John Jacob Astor) based in Saint Louis. In early 1862 Joseph LaBarge and several partners formed the firm of LaBarge, Harkness & Co., also based in Saint Louis, for purposes of trading on the upper Missouri River. Their biggest and fiercest competitor was the American Fur Company. The two companies were about to make their annual run up the Missouri River outfitted with supplies and men. The American Fur Company, determined to be the first to arrive at Fort Benton, departed Saint Louis with the Spread Eagle, commanded by Captain Robert E. Bailey, and piloted by William Massie. Three days later Captain LaBarge departed with the Emilie, the faster of the two steamboats. The Emilie eventually caught up to the Spread Eagle at Fort Berthold and passed her.

Rivalry between the two crews had been building, and because Massie earned a reputation as a skilled pilot who had made previous trips in record time, a wager had been made as to which vessel would reach Fort Benton first.

When Captain Bailey realized he was being beaten, he resorted to playing a desperate and reckless game, demonstrating to what extent he would go to win. The two vessels were now approaching an island in the middle of the river, with narrow channels on either side. The Spread Eagle took to passage through the wider channel, while the Emilie, passed in what Bailey had assumed was an impassable channel, which happened to be the shorter route. The two vessels were less than fifty feet (15 m) apart, when Bailey, realizing he was about to be out-maneuvered and fall behind, ordered the pilot, William Massie, to intentionally put his rudder to port, and plunge the bow of his boat into the Emilie close to her boilers. The danger of a serious wreck was imminent. However, though the point of impact was very close to Emilie's boilers, the vessel only suffered minor damage. LaBarge, observing the event from the pilot-house, was not expecting such tactics and could not believe that even the American Fur Company would resort to such a ploy when human life hung in the balance. Immediately he called out to Spread Eagle's pilot to stop his engines and fall back or he would take to arms and fire upon him. LaBarge's threats were effective, and the captain of the Spread Eagle gave orders to fall back and was not seen again during the race. Emilie reached Fort Benton and won the race by four days, with the Spread Eagle finally arriving on June 20. (Note: LaBarge's close friend, Father Pierre-Jean De Smet, the famous Catholic missionary on his way to Fort Benton, was also aboard the Spread Eagle during the race.)

When the Spread Eagle returned to Saint Louis charges were preferred against Bailey for his reckless endangerment to passengers of, and damage to, the Emilie. When Bailey was brought to trial before the steamboat inspector, his license was revoked. Massie was subsequently made the new captain of the Spread Eagle.

As steamboating was Bailey's only trade it was a serious blow to his livelihood, as he had a large family to support. About a month later, Bailey appealed to LaBarge with the explanation that he had been trying to get the inspector to reinstate him, but would not do so unless LaBarge pardoned Bailey with the recommendation that Bailey be allowed back on the river. Bailey having admitted his guilt in the affair, said that he acted under pressure from the company's agents, and pleaded with LaBarge to reinstate him for the sake of his family. LaBarge finally acquiesced, spoke with the inspector, and got Bailey reinstated. (Note: Several accounts by passengers aboard the Spread Eagle were recorded in diaries, including one from Father Pierre-Jean De Smet. A number of these diaries are in the possession of the Montana Historical Society.)

Two years after the race on March 20, 1864, the Spread Eagle hit a snag and sank at Pinckney Bend.

== See also ==
- Rocky Mountain Fur Company
- Yellowstone (steamboat)
- Grant Marsh — Riverboat captain on the Missouri River
- Joseph Marie LaBarge, Senior—Father of Joseph LaBarge, riverboat pilot, fur trader

== Sources ==
- Casler, Michael M. (1999). Steamboats of the Fort Union fur trade: An illustrated listing of steamboats on the Upper Missouri River, 1831-1867. Fort Union Association. ISBN 978-0-9672-2511-1.
- Chittenden, Hiram Martin (1903). History of early steamboat navigation on the Missouri River : life and adventures of Joseph La Barge, Volume I . New York : Francis P. Harper.
- —— (1903). History of early steamboat navigation on the Missouri River : life and adventures of Joseph La Barge, Volume II . New York : Francis P. Harper.
- ——; de Smet, Pierre-Jean; Richardson, Alfred Talbot (1905). Life, letters and travels of Father Pierre-Jean de Smet, S.J., 1801–1873, Volume II. New York : Francis P. Harper.
- Martin, G. W., ed. (1906) [1875]. Collections of the Kansas state historical society, Vol IX. State Printing Office, Topeka, Kansas.
- Morgan, Lewis Henry; White, Leslie A. (1993). The Indian Journals, 1859–62. Courier Corporation. ISBN 978-0-4862-7599-4.
- "Spread Eagle". Riverboat Dave's. 2016.
- Eriksmoen, Curt (2012). "Riverboat captain 'carried' bullet that killed Hickok". Bismarck Tribune.
- "Captain William Rodney Massie". Steamboats.org.
- Schake, Lowell M. (2006). La Charrette: A History of the Village Gateway to the American Frontier. iUniverse Star. ISBN 978-0-5958-0603-4.
- Barbour, Barton H. (2001). Fort Union and the Upper Missouri Fur Trade. University of Oklahoma Press. ISBN 978-0-8061-3295-2.
- O'Neil, Paul (1975). The Riverman. Time-Life Books. ISBN 978-0-8094-1496-3. - (Also in PDF format)
