= Walk-in-the-Water (steamboat) =

American sidewheel steamboat

Coordinates: 42.878°N 78.885°W

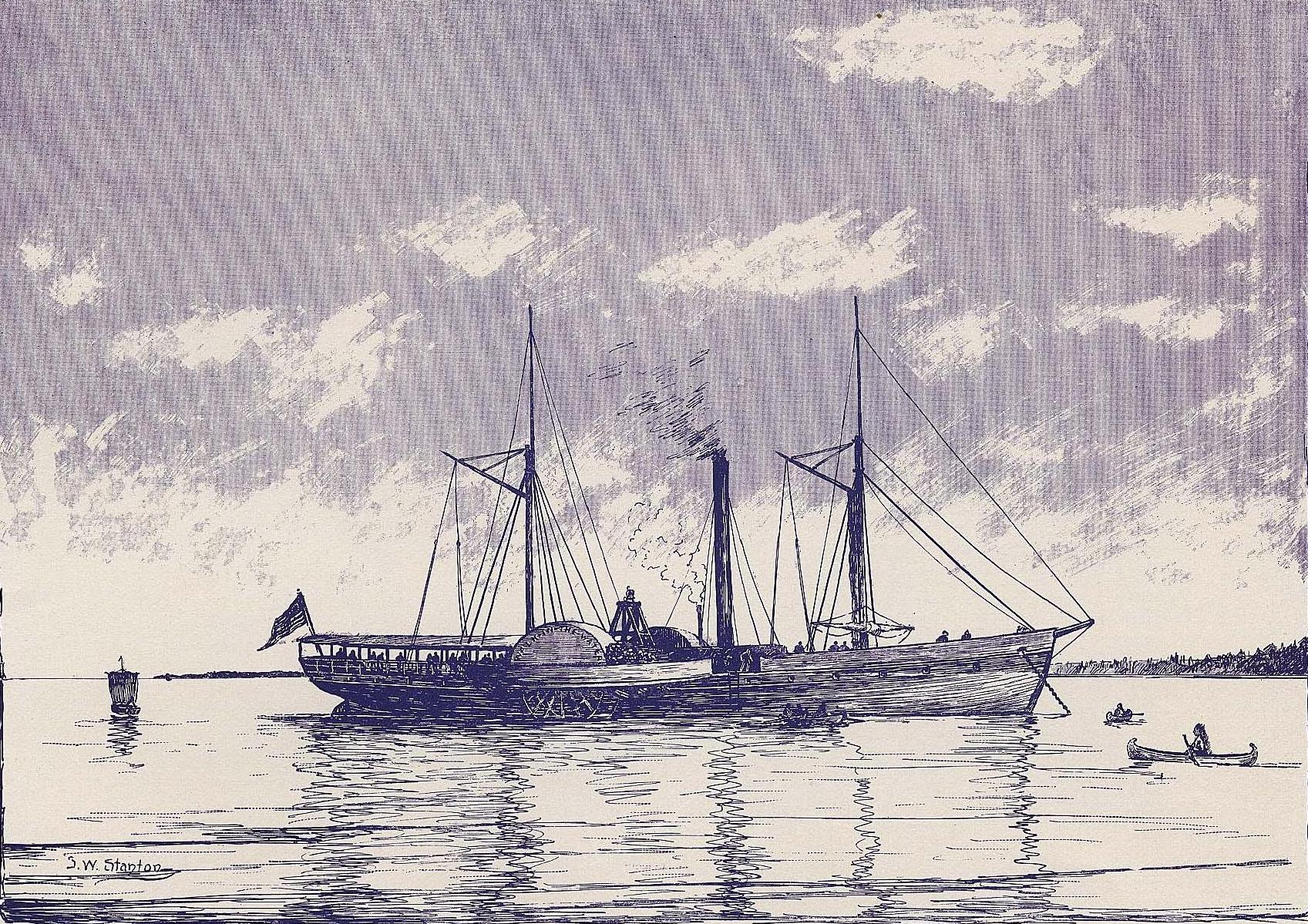
- Walk-in-the-Water – 1895 pen-and-ink drawing by S. W. Stanton, based on an unidentified earlier image

History
- Name: Walk-in-the-Water
- Owner: Lake Erie Steamboat Company
- Route: Buffalo, New York – Detroit, Michigan
- Launched: 28 May 1818
- Maiden voyage: 25 August 1818
- Fate: Ran aground, 1 November 1821
- Notes: First steamboat to traverse three of the Great Lakes

General characteristics
- Type: Sidewheel steamboat
- Tonnage: 240 tons burden
- Length: 132 ft (40 m)
- Beam: 32 ft (9.8 m)
- Depth: 8.5 ft (2.6 m)
- Installed power: Crosshead steam engine
- Propulsion: Sidewheels; auxiliary sails
- Speed: 6–10 mph (9.7–16 km/h)

Walk-in-the-Water was a sidewheel steamboat that played a pioneering role in steamboat navigation on the Great Lakes. She was the first such craft to run on Lake Erie, Lake Huron and Lake Michigan. Launched in 1818, she transported people and supplies to sites and points of interest around the Great Lakes, before being grounded and wrecked in a gale force storm in Buffalo's bay in 1821. According to some sources, Walk-in-the-Water's name originated from an Indian's impression of a steamboat moving ("walking") on the water with no sails.

== Description ==
Walk-in-the-Water was built in 1818 at Black Rock, New York for the Lake Erie Steamboat Company by Noah Brown. Her keel was constructed at Scajaquada Creek, and she was launched sideways on May 28, 1818.

Walk-in-the-Water was 132 ft (40 m) long with a beam of 32 ft (9.8 m) and a draft of 6.5 ft (2.0 m). She had two masts, a quarterdeck raised 3.5 ft (1.1 m) above the spar deck, and a transom stern. A steamboat that ran on the Great Lakes in the early 19th century, there are no photos of the vessel, but there are several eyewitness accounts of its configuration. The raised quarterdeck allowed space for the cabins below, and better visibility for the helmsman as the ship's wheel was mounted on the quarterdeck at the stern. The hull was painted white overall, with two black stripes running the length of the vessel, and gray below the waterline. The rails were green, and the stem and transom were both ornamented with gold scrolling. Mounted in the bow was a four-pound wheeled cannon, used to announce the steamer's arrivals, departures and presence, as steam whistles had yet to be invented.

Walk-in-the-Water was powered by a single cylinder, 73-horsepower crosshead steam engine with a 40 in (100 cm) bore and 4 ft (1.2 m) stroke, built in New York City by Robert McQueen. The engine was described as having "a curious arrangement of levers with as many cogs as a grist-mill", driving the paddlewheels, which were 16 ft (4.9 m) in diameter, through a series of gears. "Old-fashioned" coupling boxes between the main shaft and the paddlewheel shafts enabled the two paddlewheels to be individually engaged or disengaged. The boiler was built of copper, reportedly 24 ft (7.3 m) in length with a diameter of 9 ft (2.7 m), with a single 30 ft (9.1 m) high smokestack. The fuel was wood, preferably "well-seasoned pine and hemlock split fine". The vessel is said to have had a speed of somewhere between 6 and 10 mph (9.7–16 km/h). (Note: There is a discrepancy between these two accounts about the vessel's average speed.)

According to one of her captains, Baton Atkins, she was named after a Wyandot Indian chief, who lived about 12 mi (19 km) south of the Detroit River. Alternatively, her name may have alluded to the expression "walks in the water", reputedly said by an Indian who had seen North River, Robert Fulton's pioneering steamboat, on the Hudson River in 1807.

== Service history ==
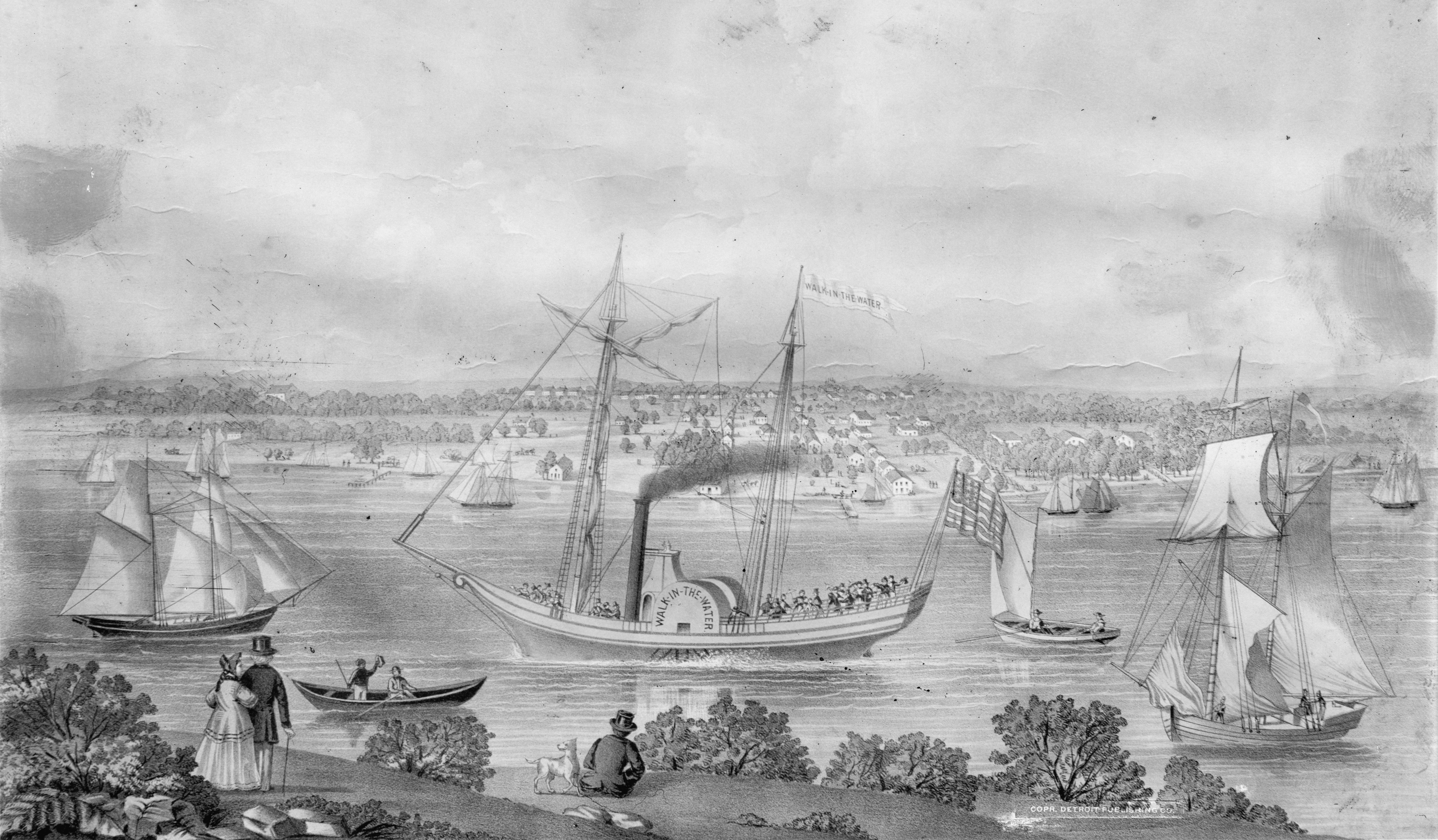
Walk-in-the-Water at Detroit, 1820. This contemporaneous sketch by George H. Whistler appears to depict many details of the vessel accurately, such as the transom stern, raised quarterdeck and twin (black) stripes along the hull.

Walk-in-the-Water was considered the pioneer of steamboat navigation on several of the Great Lakes, the first steamboat to run on Lake Erie. Job Fish was Walk-in-the-Water's first captain. Chief engineer was Brock Grant, and the second engineer was his cousin, William Whitney Grant. (Note: Grant was the former lighthouse keeper at Conneaut, Ohio.) Fish was dismissed when he rammed into the dock and blamed it on the engine crew. while he was cussing through the megaphone, where the company that owned Walk-in-the-Water soon found a replacement.

Walk-in-the-Water's maiden voyage began on August 25, 1818, from Black Rock, New York, carrying 29 passengers, bound for Dunkirk, New York; Erie, Pennsylvania; Cleveland, Ohio, and her destination port of Detroit. Because she lacked sufficient power to make headway against the strong currents of the Niagara River, a team of 20 oxen were required to assist in hauling the steamboat out of the river on the first leg of this voyage. The vessel then started her routine trips from Buffalo to Detroit on September 1, 1818. Buffalo at this time had no docks to accommodate large vessels. The steamboat completed her journey in about 9 days and traveled at about 9 mi (14 km) per hour on average. The fare for the trip in a cabin was $18 and less than half that for a bunk in steerage. Upon arrival in Cleveland, most of the townspeople came to the shore to greet the vessel.

In September 1818, Walk-in-the-Water ran aground near Erie. After repairs, she traveled in 1819 to Mackinac Island, Michigan, via Lake Huron and then to Green Bay, Wisconsin, thus becoming the first steamboat to operate on both Lakes Huron and Michigan. The widely anticipated trip was announced in the May 1819 issue of the New York Mercantile Advertiser. It took ten days for the Walk-in-the-Water to travel from Buffalo to Detroit and back again carrying supplies and goods for the American Fur Company.

During her employment on the Great Lakes, Walk-in-the-Water's passengers included many notable people, including generals Winfield Scott and Henry Leavenworth. The steamboat could accommodate one hundred cabin passengers along with a good number in the steerage deck. The vessel included a dining room, smoking room, and baggage room.

=== Loss ===
On November 1, 1821, Walk-in-the-Water was wrecked at night during gale force weather while near Buffalo, becoming the first steamboat wreck to occur on Lake Erie. She was full of freight and carried 18 passengers. Bound for Detroit, the vessel, commanded by Captain J. Rogers, had departed Buffalo at 4 p.m., on October 31 and proceeded to cross Lake Erie en route. Before reaching Point Abino some 11 mi (18 km) west of Buffalo on the Canadian shore of the lake, gale-force winds had developed. Captain Rogers made navigational efforts to avoid the winds but was unsuccessful. It was raining heavily and completely dark. The vessel was leaking badly, due to structural stress from the turbulent waters. In the late evening, the captain realized that it was virtually impossible to continue, so he turned about and proceeded back to Buffalo. After declining a dangerous proposal to dock in the river, the captain attempted to navigate to the city's pier. The light from the Buffalo Main Lighthouse was not visible because of the heavy rains and storm. At around 10 p.m., three anchors were dropped, unwittingly causing the vessel to plunge violently at its anchorage, while the leaking continued to worsen. Using the full power of the engine, the pumps were engaged while the vessel continued to drag her anchors.

Walk-in-the-Water was now in imminent danger of foundering, and a decision was made to run the vessel towards the shore. After hours of toil, around 4:30 a.m., the captain ordered all passengers on deck to avoid the possibility of them being trapped below. Not knowing their exact location, and unable to see any lights from the shore, the crew cut the anchors. With the gale behind it, the vessel drifted towards shore, and finally made contact with the beach in Buffalo's bay, near the lighthouse. The next swell lifted the vessel and set her down with a crash, causing the keel of the boat to fracture in several places, wrecking her beyond repair. Her cargo, belonging to the passengers, was also considerably damaged. Because of the darkness it was difficult for crew and passengers to know exactly where they had landed. There were no casualties involved, as all the passengers made their way to the lighthouse and took refuge inside by its fireplace. One of the passengers, Mary Palmer, who was aboard the Walk-in-the-Water on her first regular voyage and present during her final voyage, later wrote an account of the ship's loss.

Sometime later the engine of Walk-in-the-Water was salvaged and placed in the new steamboat Superior, built as a replacement for Walk-in-the-Water. In 1835 the engine was again re-used, in the saw mill of Gardner Williams in Saginaw City, Michigan.

== Legacy ==
On March 3, 1989, the United States Postal Service issued a 25-cent postage stamp depicting and commemorating the Walk-in-the-Water. Modern day historian and artist, Robert McGreevy, who writes for the Lake Shore Guardian, a historical news forum of Great Lake's history, gives lectures on the history surrounding Walk-in-the-Water and has recently completed a painting of the vessel.

== See also ==
- Yellowstone and Emilie, other steamboats that played pioneering and record-breaking roles during the mid-19th century
- Joseph LaBarge, famous steamboat captain, designer and builder of the early to mid-19th century
- Ontario, the first steam-driven sidewheeler steamboat to see active service on the Great Lakes, at Lake Ontario
- Independence, the first steamboat to run on Lake Superior, in 1846
- Spread Eagle (steamboat), owned by the American Fur Company, one of the first such vessels to navigate the upper Missouri River
- SS Merchant, first iron hulled merchant ship built on the Great Lakes

== Bibliography ==
- Heyl, Erik (1956). Early American Steamers. Vol. II. Buffalo, New York: Erik Heyl. p. 275. OCLC 1626009
- Hodge, William (1883). Papers concerning early navigation on the Great Lakes. I. Recollections of Capt Wilkeson. Buffalo, Printing house of Bigelow brothers.
- Hotchkiss, George Woodward (1898). History of the Lumber and Forest Industry of the Northwest. G.W. Hotchkiss & Company.
- Knox, Thomas Wallace (1900). The Life of Robert Fulton and a history of steam navigation. New York: G.P. Putnam.
- Mansfield, John Brandt (1899). History of the Great Lakes. Vol. I. Chicago: Beers.
- Mansfield, John Brandt (1899). History of the Great Lakes. Vol. II. Chicago: Beers.
- McGreevy, Robert (August 2018). "Walk-in-the-Water". The Lakeshore Guardian. Harbor, Beach, Michigan, serving Huron, Sanilac, St. Clair, and Tuscola Counties, Michigan. Archived from the original on June 26, 2020.
- McGreevy, Robert (2019). Mensah, Carol (ed.). "The first Great Lakes steamboat was a Walk in the Water". Great Lakes Echo.
- Musham, H. A. (January 1945). "Early Great Lakes Steamboats: The Walk-in-the-Water". The American Neptune. Salem, MA: The American Neptune, Inc. pp. 27–42. hdl:2027/mdp.39015018430473.
- Palmer, Mary A. Witherell (1821). "The Wreck Of The Walk-in-the-Water, Pioneer Steamboat On The Western Lakes". Buffalo and Erie County Historical Society, transcribed and published 1865.
- "Loss of a Steamboat". Cleveland Weekly Herald. Cleveland. November 13, 1821.
- "Walk-in-the-Water". Encyclopedia of Cleveland History. 2019.
