= Joseph Marie LaBarge, Senior =

Canadian-American frontiersman

Joseph Marie LaBarge, Senior (Note: The original spelling was Laberge, which is the common usage in Quebec; but the family in Saint Louis for many years has spelled the name in two words, La Barge.) (July 4, 1787 – January 22, 1860) was a Canadian frontiersman, trapper and fur trader, and the father of famed riverboat captain Joseph LaBarge. He journeyed to the United States in 1808, traveling many miles from Quebec in a birch-bark canoe across the Great Lakes and over rivers to Saint Louis. LaBarge later served and was wounded twice in the War of 1812. He lived a varied life in St. Louis, Missouri.

== Family ==
Joseph LaBarge Senior was born at l'Assomption, Quebec, on July 4, 1787. LaBarge was the only person of that name who emigrated to the United States. Born in 1633, LaBarge's grandfather, Robert LaBarge, (Note: French spelling: Robert de La Berge) came from Normandy, France, in the town of Colombières in the diocese of Bayeux. Robert came to the New World in his early years and made his home in Montmorency, near Quebec City, where he married in 1663. He is believed to be the only LaBarge who left France for the new world. His numerous descendants still inhabit the district of Beauharnois and possibly throughout the province of Quebec.

LaBarge married Eulalie Alvarez-Hortiz LaBarge on August 13, 1813; her father was Joseph Alvarez Hortiz, who had served as military attaché to Spanish territorial governors Zénon Trudeau and Charles Dehault DeLassus, in Upper Louisiana. Two years later, they purchased a farm at Baden, just north of St. Louis, Missouri. Their marriage brought seven children, three boys and four girls, including Joseph LaBarge, who became a noted riverboat captain on the Missouri River.

== Exploits ==
In 1808, LaBarge traveled from Quebec to St. Louis in a birch-bark canoe; to make the complex journey, he sailed up the Ottawa River, over its various tributaries in Ontario, crossed Georgian Bay, Lake Huron, into Lake Michigan, up the Fox River thence overland to the Wisconsin River and down that river to the Mississippi River, which he descended to St. Louis, with only 8 mi (13 km) of portaging along the way. During this time, the Sauk and Fox Indians were often making raids on settlers along the upper Mississippi. LaBarge was employed delivering dispatches to trading posts and settlements on Rock Island and had volunteered for this dangerous task when others refused.

LaBarge served in the War of 1812 and was wounded in the battle of the River Raisin. During the battle he had two fingers shot off by enemy fire, while also receiving a head wound from a tomahawk, leaving him with permanent scars. As a result of his service in the U.S. Army, he became a naturalized citizen and, under U.S. law, was entitled to receive a pension; however, he never requested one.

While living in St. Louis he manufactured, transported to, and sold charcoal. Not long after he moved into town, he became acquainted with many of the townspeople, particularly among the travelers and traders from Canada. LaBarge opened up a boarding-house and converted it into a hotel with a tavern. The building also had a livery stable adjoining it, which became one of the most successful in the city. However, he is said to be best noted for his fur trapping exploits in the far west. LaBarge was also present in General Ashley's ill-fated battle with the Aricara Indians on the Missouri River in 1823. He was also the man who cut the cable of one of the keelboats, allowing it to drift away from the gunfire of the Indians.

On January 20, 1860, while visiting a sick relative in St. Louis, LaBarge slipped on some icy pavement on the sidewalk at the corner of Olive and Fourth streets, resulting in serious injuries that resulted in his death two days later, on January 22.

== Legacy ==
LaBarge was best known for his adventures in the far west as a fur trapper. Various landmarks were named in his honor, including LaBarge Creek (aka Battle Creek) in Wyoming and the city of La Barge, also in Wyoming.

== See also ==
- North American fur trade
- Rocky Mountain Fur Company

== Sources ==
- Bowdern, T. S. (July 1968). "Joseph LaBarge Steamboat Captain". Missouri Historical Review. 62 (4). The State Historical Society of Missouri: 449–470.
- Chittenden, Hiram Martin (1903). History of early steamboat navigation on the Missouri River : life and adventures of Joseph La Barge, Volume I . New York : Francis P. Harper.
- Dobbs, Gordon B. (2015). Hiram Martin Chittenden: His Public Career. University Press of Kentucky. ISBN 978-0-8131-6275-1.
- LaBerge, Philip C. "Joseph Marie LaBarge (1787–1860)" (PDF). Philip C. LaBerge.
- Bowdern, T. S. (1968). "Joseph LaBarge, Steamboat Captain". The Missouri Historical Review published by the State Historical Society of Missouri.
