= 1st Missouri Cavalry Regiment =

1st Missouri Cavalry Regiment may refer to:

- 1st Missouri Cavalry Regiment (Confederate), a regiment in the Confederate States Army
- 1st Missouri Cavalry Regiment (Union), a regiment in the Union Army
- 1st Northeast Missouri Cavalry Regiment, a regiment in the Confederate States Army
