= La Barge, Wyoming =

La Bargé Wyoming
- Town
- Location of La Barge in Lincoln County, Wyoming
- Coordinates: 42°15′43″N 110°11′41″W
- Country: United States
- State: Wyoming
- County: Lincoln

Area
  - Total: 1.00 sq mi (2.58 km^{2})
  - Land: 0.97 sq mi (2.51 km^{2})
  - Water: 0.027 sq mi (0.07 km^{2})
- Elevation: 6,594 ft (2,010 m)

Population (2020)
  - Total: 394
  - Density: 586.2/sq mi (226.34/km^{2})
- Time zone: UTC-7 (Mountain (MST))
  - Summer (DST): UTC-6 (MDT)
- ZIP code: 83123
- Area code: 307
- FIPS code: 56-43455
- GNIS feature ID: 1590442
- Website: www.townoflabarge.org

La Bargé is a town in Lincoln County, Wyoming, United States. The population was 413 at the 2020 census. It is approximately 22.5 miles from Big Piney.

== History ==
The town is named for Joseph Marie La Barge, Senior, a French-Canadian voyageur turned fur trapper, mountain man, and steamboat operator, and father of the famed riverboat captain Joseph LaBarge.

== Geography ==
According to the United States Census Bureau, the town has a total area of 1.00 square mile (2.59 km^{2}), of which 0.97 square miles (2.51 km^{2}) is land and 0.03 square miles (0.08 km^{2}) is water.

== Climate ==
According to the Köppen Climate Classification system, La Barge has a warm-summer humid continental climate, abbreviated "Dfb" on climate maps. The hottest temperature recorded in La Barge was 96 °F (36 °C) on August 13, 1986, July 13–14, 2002, July 20, 2005, and July 30, 2006, while the coldest temperature recorded was −52 °F (−47 °C) on December 23, 1990.

Climate data for La Barge, Wyoming, 1991–2020 normals, extremes 1958–2012
Month	Jan	Feb	Mar	Apr	May	Jun	Jul	Aug	Sep	Oct	Nov	Dec	Year
Record high °F (°C)	59 (15)	57 (14)	68 (20)	79 (26)	88 (31)	95 (35)	96 (36)	96 (36)	90 (32)	81 (27)	68 (20)	58 (14)	96 (36)
Mean maximum °F (°C)	43.9 (6.6)	47.8 (8.8)	58.8 (14.9)	71.2 (21.8)	78.9 (26.1)	86.4 (30.2)	91.8 (33.2)	89.9 (32.2)	84.1 (28.9)	74.1 (23.4)	58.9 (14.9)	46.6 (8.1)	91.2 (32.9)
Mean daily maximum °F (°C)	29.6 (−1.3)	32.8 (0.4)	44.5 (6.9)	54.0 (12.2)	63.7 (17.6)	73.9 (23.3)	83.3 (28.5)	81.5 (27.5)	71.9 (22.2)	58.3 (14.6)	41.9 (5.5)	29.9 (−1.2)	55.4 (13.0)
Daily mean °F (°C)	13.7 (−10.2)	17.4 (−8.1)	30.7 (−0.7)	39.2 (4.0)	48.3 (9.1)	57.1 (13.9)	64.8 (18.2)	62.7 (17.1)	53.1 (11.7)	41.0 (5.0)	26.3 (−3.2)	14.9 (−9.5)	39.1 (3.9)
Mean daily minimum °F (°C)	−2.3 (−19.1)	1.9 (−16.7)	16.9 (−8.4)	24.3 (−4.3)	32.9 (0.5)	40.4 (4.7)	46.2 (7.9)	43.9 (6.6)	34.2 (1.2)	23.6 (−4.7)	10.8 (−11.8)	−0.1 (−17.8)	22.7 (−5.2)
Mean minimum °F (°C)	−25.1 (−31.7)	−25.1 (−31.7)	−6.2 (−21.2)	11.1 (−11.6)	18.8 (−7.3)	27.3 (−2.6)	34.8 (1.6)	31.5 (−0.3)	20.3 (−6.5)	8.9 (−12.8)	−12.4 (−24.7)	−24.1 (−31.2)	−31.6 (−35.3)
Record low °F (°C)	−42 (−41)	−45 (−43)	−35 (−37)	−1 (−18)	4 (−16)	16 (−9)	27 (−3)	22 (−6)	8 (−13)	−7 (−22)	−30 (−34)	−52 (−47)	−52 (−47)
Average precipitation inches (mm)	0.40 (10)	0.42 (11)	0.45 (11)	0.71 (18)	1.26 (32)	0.95 (24)	0.85 (22)	0.85 (22)	0.96 (24)	0.89 (23)	0.34 (8.6)	0.47 (12)	8.55 (217.6)
Average snowfall inches (cm)	5.2 (13)	6.0 (15)	4.2 (11)	4.8 (12)	1.2 (3.0)	0.0 (0.0)	0.0 (0.0)	0.0 (0.0)	1.2 (3.0)	3.3 (8.4)	2.4 (6.1)	5.5 (14)	33.8 (85.5)
Average precipitation days (≥ 0.01 in)	3.1	3.3	2.8	3.6	5.8	5.0	4.2	5.0	4.4	3.1	2.2	2.9	45.4
Average snowy days (≥ 0.1 in)	2.8	3.2	1.9	1.7	0.4	0.0	0.0	0.0	0.2	0.9	1.3	2.6	15.0
Source 1: NOAA
Source 2: National Weather Service (mean maxima and minima 1981–2010)

== Demographics ==
Historical population
Census	Pop.	Note	%±
1980	302		—
1990	493		63.2%
2000	431		−12.6%
2010	551		27.8%
2020	394		−28.5%
U.S. Decennial Census

=== 2010 census ===
As of the census of 2010, there were 551 people, 233 households, and 141 families living in the town. The population density was 568.0 inhabitants per square mile (219.3/km^{2}). There were 290 housing units at an average density of 299.0 per square mile (115.4/km^{2}). The racial makeup of the town was 92.4% White, 0.4% African American, 4.4% Native American, 0.9% from other races, and 2.0% from two or more races. Hispanic or Latino of any race were 4.4% of the population.

There were 233 households, of which 30.0% had children under the age of 18 living with them, 52.4% were married couples living together, 5.2% had a female householder with no husband present, 3.0% had a male householder with no wife present, and 39.5% were non-families. 29.6% of all households were made up of individuals, and 10.8% had someone living alone who was 65 years of age or older. The average household size was 2.36 and the average family size was 3.02.

The median age in the town was 37.8 years. 26.5% of residents were under the age of 18; 5.9% were between the ages of 18 and 24; 25.6% were from 25 to 44; 32.4% were from 45 to 64; and 9.4% were 65 years of age or older. The gender makeup of the town was 53.9% male and 46.1% female.

== Education ==
Public education in the town of La Barge is provided by Sublette County School District #9. Schools serving the town include La Barge Elementary School (grades K-5), Big Piney Middle School (grades 6–8), and Big Piney High School (grades 9-12).

La Barge has a public library, a branch of the Lincoln County Library System.

== See also ==
- Cabanne's Trading Post
