= Yellowstone (steamboat) =

History
- Name: Yellowstone
- Owner: American Fur Company (1831) and Thomas Toby & Brother of New Orleans (1835)
- Operator: Benjamin Young, Anson G. Bennett, Joseph La Barge, Thomas Wigg Grayson, John E. Ross, and James V. West
- Route: Missouri River, Mississippi River, Brazos River, and the Gulf of Mexico
- Ordered: November 24, 1830
- Builder: Louisville, Kentucky
- Cost: ~$4,000 for boat and ~$4,000 for engine.
- Maiden voyage: April 20, 1831
- Fate: unknown, possibly sank in Buffalo Bayou

General characteristics
- Class & type: Side-wheeler, packet boat
- Displacement: 144 tons
- Length: 120 ft (37 m) or 130 ft (40 m)
- Beam: 20 ft (6.1 m) or 19 ft (5.8 m)
- Depth: 6 ft (1.8 m) or 5.5 ft (1.7 m)
- Decks: Three: Hold, Main Deck and Boiler Deck.
- Installed power: 1 boiler, as built; refitted with two boilers in 1835.
- Propulsion: Two 18 ft (5.5 m) paddlewheels
- Capacity: 75 tons, 72 passengers, and 22 crew.
- Crew: 22
- Notes: First steamboat to reach above Council Bluff, Iowa, on the Missouri River (1831); First steamboat to reach mouth of Yellowstone River (1832); Crossed Texan Army on Brazos River in Texas War for Independence (1836).

The steamer Yellow-Stone on the 19th April 1833 (circa 1832): aquatint by Karl Bodmer from the book Maximilian, Prince of Wied's Travels in the Interior of North America, during the years 1832–1834

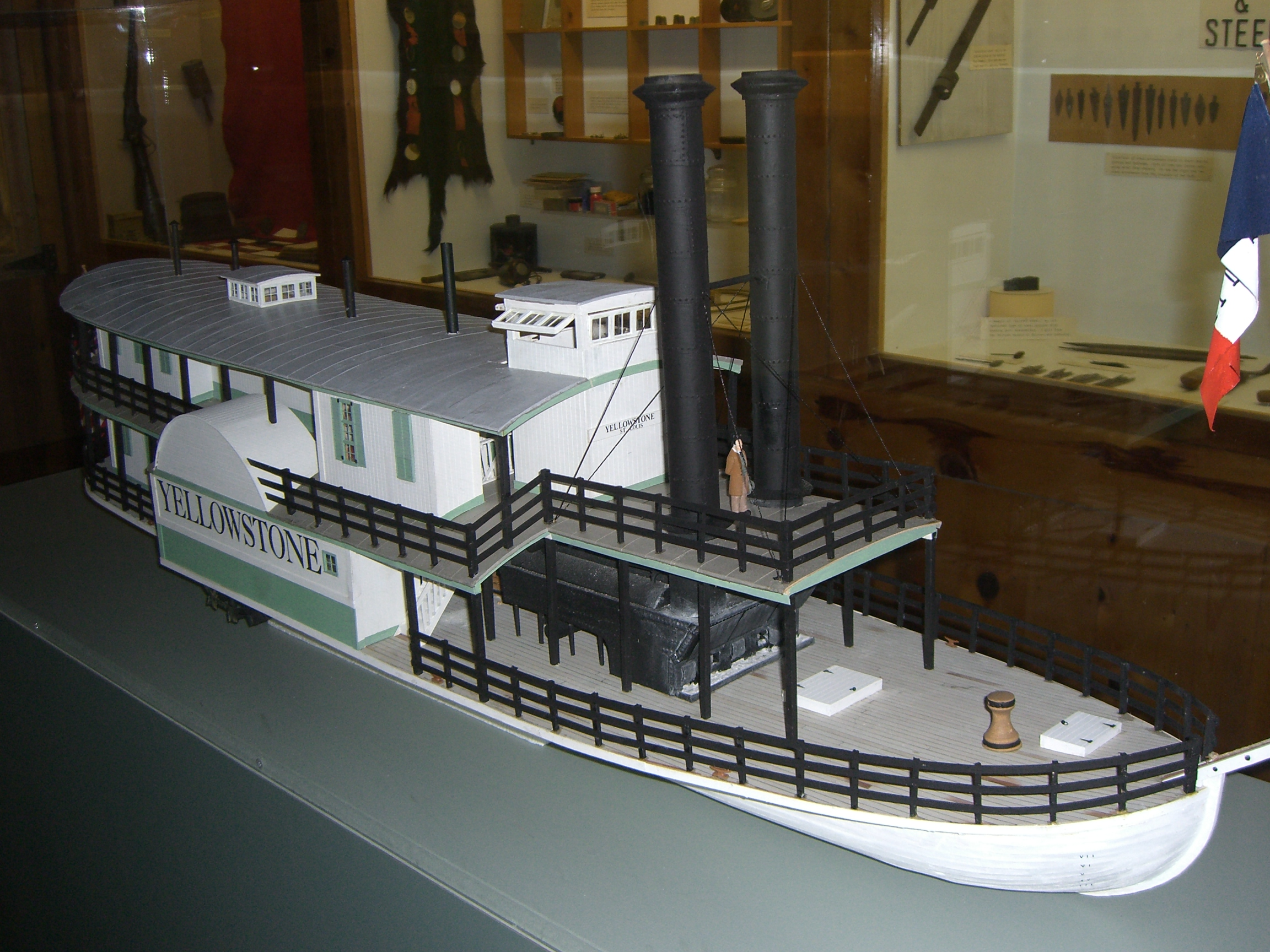
Model of Steamboat "Yellowstone", Museum of the Fur Trade, Nebraska, USA

The steamboat Yellowstone (sometimes Yellow Stone) was a side wheeler steamboat built in Louisville, Kentucky, for the American Fur Company for service on the Missouri River. By design, the Yellowstone was the first powered boat to reach above Council Bluffs, Iowa, on the Missouri River achieving, on her maiden voyage, Fort Tecumseh, South Dakota, on June 19, 1831. The Yellowstone also played an important role in the Texas Revolution of 1836, crossing the Texas Army under Sam Houston over the swollen Brazos River ahead of Santa Anna's pursuing Mexican Army.

== Early career on the Missouri River ==
The Yellowstone was built between 1830 and 1831 in Louisville, Kentucky, for the American Fur Company to service the fur trade between Saint Louis, Missouri, and the trading camps along the Missouri River up to the mouth of the Yellowstone River in western North Dakota in support of their Montana fur trade. Prior to the Yellowstone, fur traders beyond Council Bluff relied on un-powered keelboats which had to be dragged up-river for supply and then floated downstream with their furs. Beginning in St. Louis, The Yellowstone made her maiden voyage on April 20, 1831, and reached Pierre, South Dakota, on June 19, 1831, six hundred miles farther than any other steamboat, dramatically opening the way for regular travel and trade along the upper stretches of the Missouri River. She returned, fully loaded, to Saint Louis on July 15, 1831.

The following year, 1832, the Yellowstone reached the mouth of the river for which she was named. That voyage was chronicled by George Catlin.

In 1833, German naturalist Prince Alexander Philipp Maximilian zu Wied-Neuwied, together with Swiss artist Karl Bodmer traveled the Missouri River on board the Yellowstone. That journey was also chronicled in Maximilian's Reise in das Innere Nord-Amerikas. Karl Bodmer's depiction of the Yellowstone struggling over a sand bar may be the most accurate depiction of the steamboat in existence.

In July 1833, the crew and passengers of the Yellowstone was overcome by cholera. Many of the crew and passengers, including the firemen and assistant Indian Agent Robinson Pemberton Beauchamp, died, and the boat was under threat of being burned by locals in both Iowa and Nebraska who were afraid of contagion. Leaving famed steamboat captain, then a clerk and pilot, Joseph LaBarge, to hold and protect the boat and its ailing crew, the Yellowstone's captain, Anson G. Bennett, ventured downstream to St. Louis, and soon returned with a new crew.

From 1831 through 1833, regular runs of the steamboat took advantage of the higher river due to April snow melts and again in June and July by favor of snow melt from the Rocky Mountains. During the winters when ice prevented such travel and late summer when water levels were insufficient for the six foot draft of the vessel, the Yellowstone served the cotton and sugar cane markets along the lower Mississippi River. After the final July 1833 run up the Missouri River, the steamboat continued the work along the Mississippi River with Captain John P. Phillips, under new ownership.

In November 1835, the Yellowstone steamed to New Orleans for a significant refit, a second boiler was added and much of the wooden components replaced with newer wood. Meanwhile, she was sold yet again and registered by the new owners for trade runs in foreign (specifically, the then Mexican Texas) waters.

== Career in Texas Revolution ==
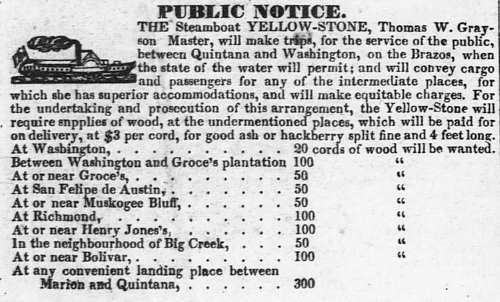
A December 1836 advertisement for packet service on the Brazos River, Republic of Texas, between Quintana and Washington.

The steamboat was purchased by Thomas Toby & Brother to focus upon the cotton trade along the Brazos River in Texas, carrying bales from the growers down to Quintana on the Gulf Coast. Departing New Orleans on New Year's Eve, 1835, she was loaded with arms, ammunition and forty-seven volunteers of the Mobile Greys destined to support the Texans in their fight for Independence against Santa Anna.

In late March and early April 1836, despite three Mexican forces under Generals Antonio Lopez de Santa Anna, Antonio Gaona and Jose Urrea all searching for the Texas army along the right bank of the Brazos River, the Yellowstone steamed upstream to continue collecting cotton from the growers. In early April, Santa Anna was camped at San Felipe de Austin, fifteen miles below the yet undiscovered Texas camp near Groce's Landing, while General Gaona was marching southward down the Brazos from the San Antonio Road, leaving the Texans caught between.

On April 2, Sam Houston sent word to the Yellowstone to remain at Groce's Landing, and prepare to assist in crossing the Texas Army. The captain and crew complied. On April 12, the Yellowstone began crossing the entire Texas Army, completing the crossing with multiple trips by mid-afternoon the following day. On April 14, as the Texans marched toward San Jacinto, the Yellowstone, still armored in cotton bales, began her sprint downstream to pass the Mexican camps on her way to the Gulf.

With her bell clanging and smoke billowing, the Yellowstone sent many of the Mexican soldiers running in fear, having never known the existence of such a craft as a steamboat. One Mexican soldier is reported to have attempted to lasso her by her smoke stack as others fired on the craft heeding Santa Anna's order to capture the boat for his own crossing. The bullet-ridden stacks represented the only damage the steamboat incurred as she quickly outran her pursuers.

Soon after the Texans' victory at San Jacinto on April 21, 1836, the Yellowstone was waiting nearby and received the wounded Commander in Chief, Sam Houston, the new republic's interim president David G. Burnet, the captured Santa Anna and forty-seven Mexican prisoners. She was held for a time for the purpose of returning the captive Santa Anna to Mexico, but Santa Anna's return would be delayed many months.

Later that year and still in service (then as a packet boat along Buffalo Bayou), the Yellowstone was called upon to take the body of Texas hero Stephen F. Austin to burial, and then return mourners along the Brazos River afterward.

== Final disposition ==
The ultimate fate of the Yellowstone is not recorded. Texas legend is that she sank in Buffalo Bayou in 1837; however, no record of such an end exists. A record does exist stating that a steamboat by that name passed through the Louisville and Portland Canal on the Ohio River, in the summer of 1837. The Daughters of the Republic of Texas Library in San Antonio is said to contain a brass bell purported to be that of the Yellowstone.

== See also ==
- Ontario (steamboat), the first steam driven sidewheeler steamboat to see active service on the Great Lakes, at Lake Ontario.

== Sources ==
- Jackson, Donald, Voyages of the Steamboat Yellow Stone, New York: Ticknor & Fields, 1985.
- Chappell, P. E., A History of the Missouri River, Kansas State Historical Society Pub. Vol. IX, p. 282
- Cushing S. W.,Wild Oats Sowing, Daniel Fanshaw, New York 1857.
- Puryear, Pamela Ashworth and Nath Winfield Jr., Sandbars and Sternwheelers, Steam Navigation on the Brazos; Texas A&M University Press, College Station, 1976.
- Moore, Stephen L. Eighteen Minutes the Battle of San Jacinto and the Texas Independence Campaign. Dallas: Republic of Texas, Distributed by National Book Network, 2004.
