= Ontario (steamboat) =

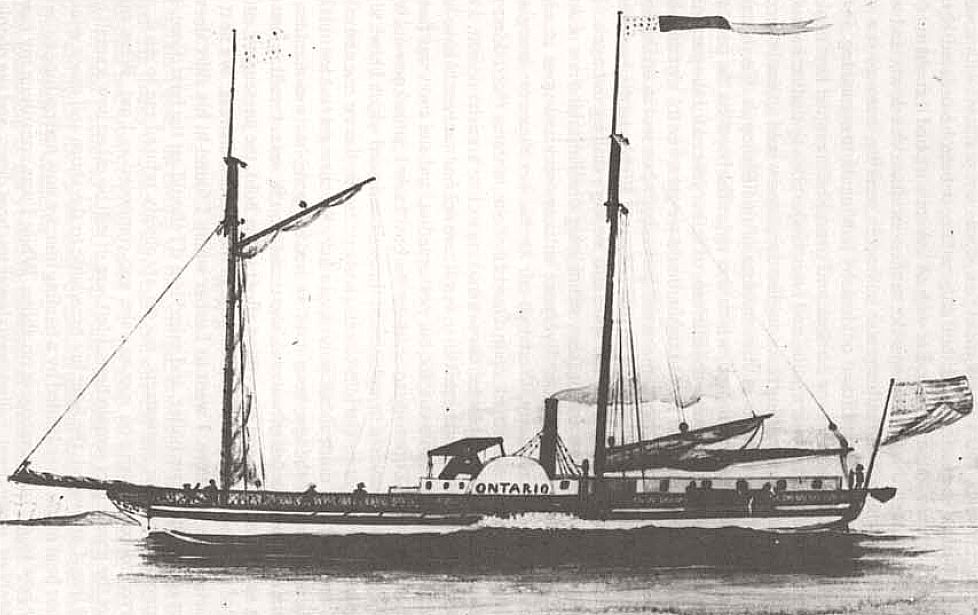
- Illustration of Ontario

History
- Name: Ontario
- Owner: Ontario Steamboat Company
- Route: Ogdensburg–Lewiston
- Builder: C. Smyth, D. Boyd, J. DeGraff, E. Lusher, and A. Van Santvoord, Sackets Harbor
- Launched: 1817
- Maiden voyage: April 1817
- Fate: Broken up, 1832

General characteristics
- Class & type: Sidewheeler steamboat
- Tonnage: 240 tons
- Installed power: 21 hp
- Propulsion: 1× crosshead steam engine; 2× 11 ft (3.4 m) paddle wheels; Sails (two masts, schooner rig)
- Speed: 5 mph (8.0 km/h)

The Ontario was a steam driven sidewheeler steamboat, launched in 1817, and the first such craft to see active service on the Great Lakes, at Lake Ontario. Ontario departed Sackets Harbor, New York on its maiden voyage sometime in April 1817. Financed by the late Robert Fulton's estate, the Ontario was built with the hopes that it would fare well commercially, and prove efficient on the often windy and turbulent Great Lakes. Her time on the lake delivering people and goods proved a success, and helped to usher in a new era of maritime commerce.

== Description ==
The Ontario was 110 ft (34 m) in length, had a beam of 24 ft (7.3 m), an 8 ft (2.4 m) depth of hold with a capacity of 240 tons. The ship's chief carpenter was Ashel Roberts. The engine for Ontario was a low pressure 21 horsepower crosshead, built in New York City by the J. P. Allair Works. Her boilers were 17 ft (5.2 m) long and 3.5 ft (1.1 m) in diameter, with a steam cylinder of 20 in (510 mm) in diameter with a 3 ft (0.91 m) stroke. (Note: Accounts of cylinder dimensions vary: The Ontario and St. Lawrence Steamboat Company's hand-book reports the engine cylinder diameter at 34 in (860 mm) with a 4 ft (1.2 m) stroke.) Her paddle wheels had a diameter of 11 ft (3.4 m). Ontario was also outfitted with two masts and schooner style sails to assist the engine when the wind was effective enough.

== Construction ==
Preliminary to the construction of the Ontario, articles of agreement were drawn up in 1815 for Harris Fulton and William Cutting of New York, the executors of the estates of the late Robert Fulton, Robert Livingston, (Note: Livingston was a founding father who administered the Oath of Office to George Washington.) and Charles Smyth, Thomas Duane and David Boyd, who were now the owners of the rights and privileges of steamboat navigation in New York State. The agreement gave Smyth and Joseph C. Yates the sole right for employment of steam navigation on Lake Ontario.

The Ontario (Note: Not to be confused with the schooner, Ontario, built in 1809, or the gunboat USS Ontario, that fought in the War of 1812, both of which operated in the Great Lakes.) was built by Charles Smyth, David Boyd, John DeGraff, Eri Lusher, and Abraham Van Santvoord, who petitioned the New York State Legislature for the rights to incorporate and be the sole steamboat operators on Lake Ontario, which would give them a monopoly on steam navigation. The courts decided against their claims.

The Ontario was the first such steamboat placed on lakewater, subject to high winds and swells, and one of the main reasons for her construction was to "test the power of steam against wind and wave". Her construction was financed by a grant from the heirs of Robert Fulton, and marked the beginning of an important era in steamboat navigation. Before Ontario's appearance on the Great Lakes, steamboat navigation had been confined to rivers.

With the Fulton rights assigned to them, Smyth and Lusher proceeded, having already invested a substantial amount of capital, and formed a partnership. The articles were finalized on January 16, 1817. When its proceeds exceeded 20 percent, and with the help of the U.S. Navy, the Ontario Steamboat Company was established, which held a $200,000 capital. Subsequently, construction of Ontario commenced at Sackets Harbor, using a large quantity of surplus lumber and supplies left there after the War of 1812 by, and purchased from, the U.S. Navy.

== Service history ==
The date Ontario was launched is not the same date of her actual maiden voyage across the lake, which occurred shortly thereafter. Dates for the maiden voyage of Ontario vary and are not absolutely conclusive. According to a letter, dated April 22, 1817, mailed from Sackets Harbor, her maiden voyage occurred on April 16, 1817. Newspaper accounts vary and cover the event in general terms. When the Ontario was launched, untested in rough waters, it was assumed that the enormous weight of the paddle wheels and shaft were enough to keep the apparatus in place on their bearings. Still, the large and momentous waves lifted and heaved the paddle wheels off from their bearings, which tore away the wooden coverings, forcing the captain to turn about and discontinue the voyage. After making the necessary repairs the shaft was securely held on its mounts.

The first commander of the Ontario was Captain Francis Malaby, of the U.S. Navy. Ontario's first commissions involved trips between Ogdensburg on the Saint Lawrence River, and Lewiston across the lake on the Niagara River, cruising at an average speed of 5 mph. Ontario's unprecedented journeys were announced by the various local newspapers and she was greeted with cheers and celebration wherever she arrived.

The Ontario remained in operation until 1832, and was dismantled in Oswego, New York, that year.

== See also ==
- Independence (steamboat), first steamboat to run on Lake Superior, 1846
- Walk-in-the-water (steamboat), first steamboat on Lakes Erie, Huron and Michigan
- Joseph LaBarge, famous record breaking steamboat captain on the Missouri River
- Great Lakes passenger steamers
- SS Merchant, first iron hulled merchant ship built on the Great Lakes

== Bibliography ==
- Cumberland, Barlow (1913). A century of sail and steam on the Niagara River. Toronto : Musson Book Co.
- Mansfield, John Brandt (1899). History of the Great Lakes, Vol I. Chicago, Beers.
- Mansfield, John Brandt (1899). History of the Great Lakes, Vol II. Chicago, Beers.
- Palmer, Richard F. (1988). First Steamboat on the Great Lakes (PDF). Archived from the original (PDF) on 2019-10-16.
- Ontario (Steamboat), 1 Aug 1816
- The Ontario and St. Lawrence Steamboat Company's hand-book for travelers to Niagara Falls, Montreal and Quebec, and through Lake Champlain to Saratoga Springs. Buffalo [N.Y.] : Jewett, Thomas & Co. 1852.
