= John E. Sunder =

American historian

John E. Sunder (1928-2011) (a.k.a. Jack Sunder) was an American historian, specializing in the early American West, and a naturalist and birdwatcher.

== Personal and professional life ==
John Edward Sunder was born in St. Louis, Missouri on October 10, 1928. He graduated with his Bachelor of Arts in 1949, Master of Arts in 1950 and Ph.D. in history in 1954 from Washington University in St. Louis. He joined the United States Army and served in Korea for two years. After returning from Korea, he moved to Austin, Texas in 1956. Sunder started birdwatching in the 1960s. He taught western history at the University of Texas. Sunder's historical research focused on the North American fur trade, the history of the Arctic, Canada, and American Indian history. He was the first person to teach a course about American Indian history in the University of Texas history department. He died in 2011.

== Nature writing & birding ==
Sunder would become an active birder, in Central Texas, in the 1960s. He co-founded the American Birding Association. He participated in the Christmas Bird Count and was a frequent visitor to Pedernales Falls State Park, Bastrop State Park, McKinney Falls State Park, and Barton Springs. He also birded internationally, visiting New Zealand, South America, Finland and Iceland. He was a member of the Sierra Club and Nature Conservancy.

== Legacy ==
Sunder's journals, "Occasional Observations on Nature," are held in the collection of the Austin History Center. His papers, and a collection of his photographs, are held in the collection of the Dolph Briscoe Center for American History. The University of Alaska Anchorage holds a collection of his photographic slides from trips to Alaska, British Columbia and the Yukon.

He is buried at Austin Memorial Park Cemetery, Austin, Texas.
