= Hiram M. Chittenden =

American engineer & historian (1858–1917)

- Chittenden in 1916
- Born: Hiram Martin Chittenden; October 25, 1858; Yorkshire, New York, U.S.
- Died: October 9, 1917 (aged 58); Seattle, Washington, U.S.
- Resting place: Lake View Cemetery, Seattle
- Education: United States Military Academy at West Point
- Engineering career
- Institutions: Army Corps of Engineers
- Projects: Chittenden Memorial Bridge, Grand Loop Road Historic District, Roosevelt Arch, Chittenden Locks, Sylvan Pass (Wyoming)

Hiram Martin Chittenden (October 25, 1858 – October 9, 1917) was an American engineer and historian. A graduate of West Point, he was the Seattle district engineer for the Army Corps of Engineers from 1906 to 1908). Chittenden was one of the first three elected Port Commissioners at the Port of Seattle. He also helped found the Pacific Coast Association of Port Authorities, later known as the Association of Pacific Ports in 1913. The Hiram M. Chittenden Locks in Seattle are named in his honor.

As a historian he was noted for his work on the American West, especially the fur trade. Historian Gordon B. Dodds stated,

His works on the Yellowstone, the fur trade, and on Missouri River steamboating were long recognized as definitive....His style was formal, clear, and undramatic. His works contain a mass of detail. He was typical of the Progressive era of American history in his strong belief in progress and in 'the divine mission of the Anglo-Saxon.'

Chittenden also wrote the noted work History of early steamboat navigation on the Missouri River: life and adventures of Joseph La Barge.

== Early life ==
Hiram Martin Chittenden was born on October 25, 1858, in Yorkshire Township, New York, near Buffalo. He was the oldest child of William Fletcher Chittenden (1835–1923) and Mary Jane Wheeler Chittenden (1836–1924), who owned a farm. Chittenden had a younger brother, Clyde (1860–1953), and a sister, Ida (1864–1954).

In 1878 Chittenden accepted a scholarship to Cornell University and an appointment by his congressman to the United States Military Academy at West Point. After attending Cornell for two terms, he studied literature, languages, and history briefly at Ithaca, New York before transferring to West Point in 1880. Steaming down the Hudson River on the Vibbard, Chittenden arrived at the United States Military Academy at West Point. He found its atmosphere quite different than at Cornell, with its rigorous schedule and emphasis on discipline, and the constant drilling. Chittenden graduated on June 15, 1884, first in his class in the area of discipline and third overall. Shortly after graduation, Chittenden was commissioned as a 2nd Lieutenant in the Army Corps of Engineers. In September 1884, he continued his education at the university at Willets Point in New York City, an engineering school serving the Corps of Engineers. On December 30, 1884, he married Nettie at Arcade, her home town. Their marriage brought two sons and a daughter. After completing his education, his tours of duty were mainly in the West, including two terms of service in Yellowstone Park (1891–1893, 1899–1904). His service at Yellowstone sparked his lifelong interest in history and conservation.

== Career ==
=== Engineering projects ===
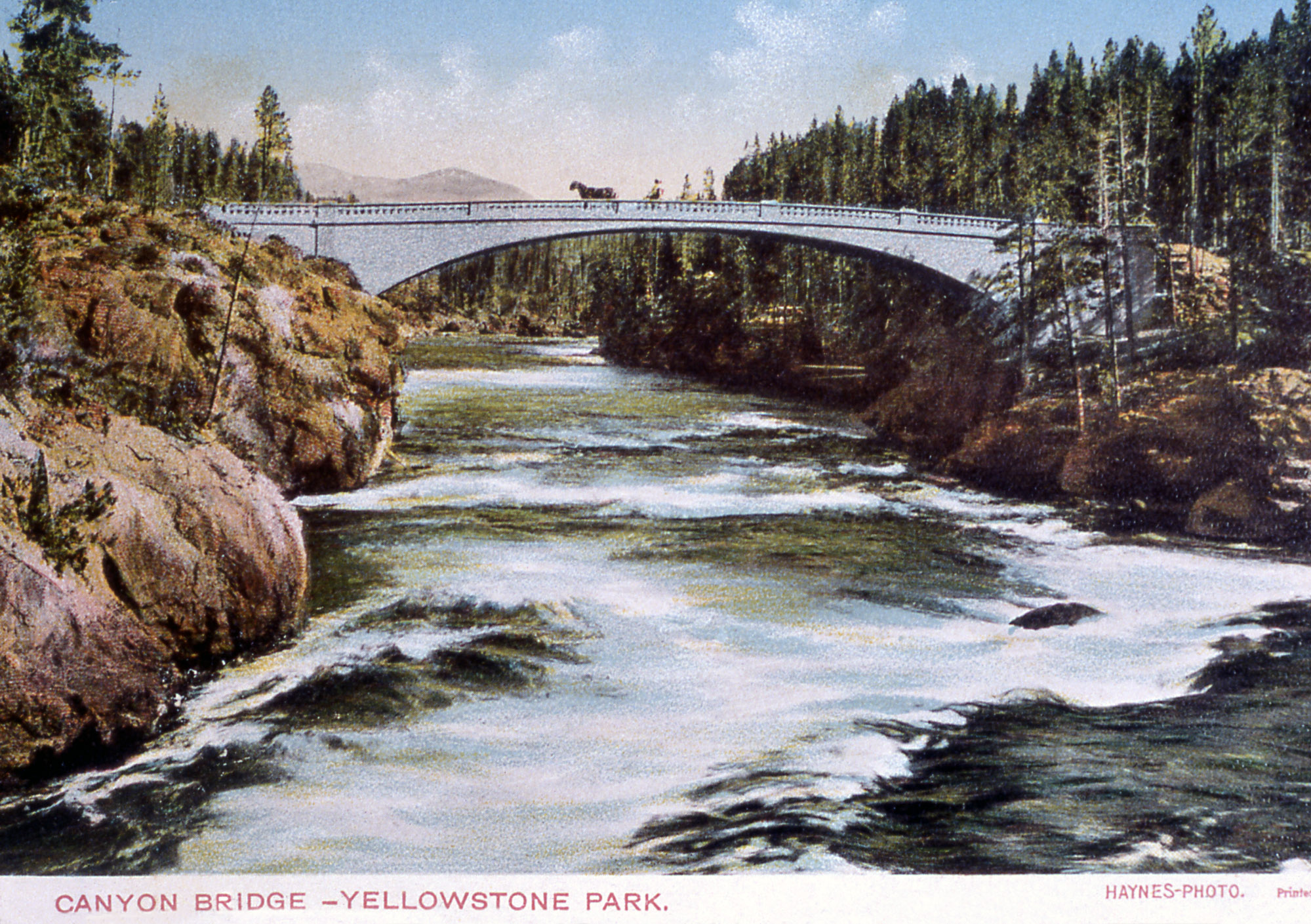
1903 colored postcard image of the Chittenden Memorial Bridge

With the Army Corps of Engineers, Chittenden was in charge of many notable projects throughout the United States. In 1899 after the Spanish–American War he was again sent to Yellowstone National Park and was in exclusive charge of the road work and general improvements, the basalt arch at the northern entrance and the single-span Chittenden Memorial Bridge (formerly the Melan arch bridge) across the Yellowstone River.

Chittenden served as an engineer in two terms of service at Yellowstone National Park in 1891–1892 and 1899–1906. In 1891 he was commissioned as an assistant to the officer in charge of road construction. From 1899 to 1906 Chittenden held several posts concurrently and was assigned to a number of projects that kept him moving to different regions, eventually bringing him to Yosemite National Park in the far west. Yosemite was in need of having its boundaries officially established, as the national park was created in stages in piecemeal fashion. Chittenden was commissioned by the Secretary of the Interior, Ethan A. Hitchcock, to determine boundary changes because of his expertise in such matters. Of greatest concern to the government was the various private land claims in and around the park. Chittenden was requested by Hitchcock to take on the task and assume the role of senior member on the commission to study the Yosemite region. The chief of Engineers approved the choice of Chittenden, asserting that his "service would be of more value than any other officer" because of his extensive experience. Along with Chittenden, R. B. Marshall, a topographer, and Frank Bond, from the United States General Land office were also members of the commission.

In the spring of 1906 Chittenden moved to Seattle, Washington. That year the developer James A. Moore offered to complete a canal to link Lake Washington, Lake Union, and Salmon Bay, at a cost of half a million dollars. Calls for such a project had been in the works for years. Since the Federal government had jurisdiction over the navigable waters, congressional approval was necessary to commence work on the project and would inevitably require Chittenden's involvement. Chittenden in May 1906 was directed to review Moore's plan for canal work. Having found it inadequate he reported his findings on May 26. However, on June 11 President Taft signed a bill approving Moore's proposal. Disappointed, Chittenden prepared an extensive report on how to accomplish the task of completing the canal work. He submitted several proposals that called for alterations to Moore's plan, some of them proving to be controversial, calling into question the required number of locks and their locations. An issue that had bothered Chittenden from the start was the location of the locks on Salmon Bay; either location would compromise the interests of the various parties involved, including residents, mill owners, and steamboat owners. He came up with a proposal calling for both a large and a small lock, which would be constructed of concrete and masonry work next to each other at the narrow foot at the west end of Salmon Bay, rather than using Moore's proposal for a single lock constructed of wood at the head of the bay. Chittenden found himself in an uncomfortable position and did not want to shoulder the responsibility of making the difficult choice. He ultimately contended that the decisions should be made by the various local interests since they were providing the financing required for the work involved. On March 18, 1907, the Washington legislature passed a bill permitting the construction of locks on the western end of Salmon Bay. Chittenden prepared a full report on the existing canal to the Chief of Engineers, knowing that if the plan and its financing were supported by the people he could complete the canal before the winter of 1909 set in. Chittenden reached the rank of brigadier general on February 5, 1910, and five days later he retired.

Chittenden's outlook over his remaining years in the service changed when an order issued by President Theodore Roosevelt a famous veteran cavalry man himself, that the annual physical exam require each officer to pass a fifty-mile test on horseback, or face retirement. Chittenden was anxious of the test because his health was not the best due to his arduous service fraught with perils, including typhoid fever, causing gradual paralysis of his legs and attacks of nervous exhaustion. At forty-nine, he had to pass the test or be forced to retire, with only the prospect of a small pension to support his wife and children. To ready himself he began taking practice rides. On his birthday in 1907 Chittenden was examined by military doctors, who discovered his precarious physical condition. Of the three officers on the health board, two refused to let him take the long ride. Alarmed by the looming consequences, Chittenden pleaded with the board to reconsider and permit him to take the ride. The board subsequently referred the matter to senior officer General Adolphus W. Greely, who left the decision to Chittenden. Upon completion of the test he suffered a major physical setback that caused a partial paralysis in his legs.

=== Historian ===
Chittenden's 1902 history of the fur trade has been highly influential among historians of the West. His first major work and publication was Yellowstone National Park: Historical and Descriptive (1895), which he authored during his first years working at Yellowstone. He also authored a two-volume book on the life of Joseph LaBarge and his life as a fur trader and steamboat captain on the Missouri River. In 1896 Chittenden decided to write an account of steamboat wrecks that occurred on the Missouri River in an attempt to determine which types of improvements for navigation were needed. Searching for information he met the retired Joseph LaBarge, who had an extensive and often first-hand knowledge of steamboat history on the Missouri River. Though LaBarge was willing to forgo any pay, Chittenden hired him as an assistant. While working with LaBarge, he soon discovered how knowledgeable and involved LaBarge was with Missouri River history and asked him to compile his documents and memoirs involving his career as a riverboat captain. Work was interrupted when Chittenden was called away during the Spanish–American War of 1898. While stationed in Huntsville, Alabama, he received news from Saint Louis that LaBarge was dying. Chittenden immediately telegraphed LaBarge's son asking him to assure LaBarge that "I shall faithfully finish his work. It will take me a long time, but I shall not fail to do it." Chittenden's telegraph reached LaBarge one and a half hours before he died.

Historian Gordon Dobbs maintains that no other historian before or after Chittenden has gone through the "half carload" of documents and manuscripts from the American Fur Company.

== Later life ==
In June 1916, Chittenden penned a letter to the editor of the New York Times, praising the U.S. Congress for passing the Ransdell-Humphreys bill by a huge margin. In international matters, his views during his last years became more nationalist towards the idea of war readiness and its effect on peace, a departure to what he espoused in his book War or Peace that preparing for war would prevent war, sentiments he had expressed in another letter to the New York Times editor. In 1917 he condemned President Woodrow Wilson's speech "Peace without Victory". When Germany continued its unrestricted submarine warfare campaign he wrote "I hope so" to the prospect of the United States entering the war. This was Chittenden's last public cause. One of the great events for Chittenden during his last years was the opening of the Lake Washington Canal, which was inaugurated before a huge crowd.

On October 9, 1917, Chittenden died in Seattle shortly after midnight, at the age of 58. Funeral services were held two days later, with Reverend Mark Matthews delivering the service. Because the country was then at war, there was no military service conducted. The service was simple with a prayer and two hymns sung, in accordance with Chittenden's wishes.

== Works ==
- Chittenden, Hiram Martin (1895). The Yellowstone National Park, historical and Descriptive. Cincinnati, The Robert Clarke company. (Chittenden put out several versions of this book until his death. Mojor Revisions were released in 1912 and 1915).
- —— (1902). The American fur trade of the far West: a history of the pioneer trading posts and early fur companies of the Missouri valley and the Rocky mountains and the overland commerce with Santa Fe (Three Volumes). F.P. Harper. (Vol. I, Vol. II Vol III not available in the 1902 edition.)
- —— (1903). History of early steamboat navigation on the Missouri River : life and adventures of Joseph La Barge, Volume I . New York : Francis P. Harper.
- —— (1903). History of early steamboat navigation on the Missouri River : life and adventures of Joseph La Barge, Volume II . New York : Francis P. Harper.
- Chittenden, Hiram Martin; de Smet, Pierre-Jean; Richardson, Alfred Talbot (1905). Life, letters and travels of Father Pierre-Jean de Smet, S.J., 1801–1873, Volume I. New York : Francis P. Harper.
- ——; de Smet, Pierre-Jean; Richardson, Alfred Talbot (1905). Life, letters and travels of Father Pierre-Jean de Smet, S.J., 1801–1873, Volume II. New York : Francis P. Harper.
- ——; de Smet, Pierre-Jean; Richardson, Alfred Talbot (1905). Life, letters and travels of Father Pierre-Jean de Smet, S.J., 1801–1873, Volume III. New York : Francis P. Harper.
- ——; de Smet, Pierre-Jean; Richardson, Alfred Talbot (1905). Life, letters and travels of Father Pierre-Jean de Smet, S.J., 1801–1873, Volume IV. New York : Francis P. Harper.
- —— (1911). War or peace, a present duty and a future hope. Cincinnati, Stewart & Kidd company.
- —— (1913). Ports of the Pacific. (Publisher not indicated).

== See also ==
- National Irrigation Congress

== Bibliography ==
- Dobbs, Gordon B. (2015). Hiram Martin Chittenden: His Public Career. University Press of Kentucky. ISBN 978-0-8131-6275-1.
- Chittenden, Hiram Martin (1902). The American fur trade of the far West: a history of the pioneer trading posts and early fur companies of the Missouri valley and the Rocky mountains and the overland commerce with Santa Fe ... F.P. Harper. (Three volumes)
- —— (1903). History of early steamboat navigation on the Missouri River : life and adventures of Joseph La Barge, Volume I . New York : Francis P. Harper.
- —— (1903). History of early steamboat navigation on the Missouri River : life and adventures of Joseph La Barge, Volume II . New York : Francis P. Harper.
- —— (1918). The Yellowstone national park, historical and descriptive. Cincinnati, Stewart & Kidd company.
- Life and Letters of Father de Smet’ with A. T. Richardson, 1905. (Four volumes)
- War or Peace, 1910.
- Chittenden, Hiram Martin (1915). The Yellowstone national park: historical and descriptive ... Stewart & Kidd company.
- Scott, Leslie M. (March 1918). "News and Comment-Death of Hiram M. Chittenden" . The Quarterly of the Oregon Historical Society. 19 (1). Oregon Historical Society: 73–87.
- Caldbick, John (2017). "Chittenden, Hiram Martin (1858–1917)". The State of Washington, HistoryLink.org.
- Dodds, Gordon B. (Autumn 1963). "A Dedication to the Memory of Hiram Martin Chittenden, 1858–1917". Journal of the Southwest. 5 (3): 183–186. JSTOR 40167070.
