= John Mitchell =

John Mitchell or Mitchel may refer to:

== Arts ==
- John Mitchell, American jazz banjoist who has worked with Johnny Dunn
- John Mitchell, Canadian ice dancer in the 1962 World Figure Skating Championships
- John Mitchell (minister) (1794–1870), American minister and author
- John Mitchell (musician) (born 1973), lead singer and guitarist for UK band It Bites, and music producer
- John Ames Mitchell (1844–1918), American illustrator
- John Cameron Mitchell (born 1963), American filmmaker
- John Campbell Mitchell (1861–1922), Scottish landscape artist
- Grant Mitchell (actor) (John Grant Mitchell Jr., 1874–1957), American character actor in the 1930s and 1940s
- John Hanson Mitchell (born 1940), American author
- Mitch Mitchell (John Graham Mitchell, 1946–2008), English musician
- John R. Mitchell (poet) (1940–2006), poet and a professor of English
- John W. Mitchell (1917–2005), British sound engineer
- John Wendell Mitchell (1880–1951), Canadian author

== Business ==
- John Mitchell Jr. (1863–1929), editor of the Richmond Planet, a newspaper in Richmond, Virginia's Jackson Ward community
- John Mitchell (labor leader) (1870–1919), American labor leader, president of the United Mine Workers of America
- John Francis Mitchell (1928–2009), vice chairman, Motorola; inventor of the mobile cell phone
- John G. Mitchell (editor) (died 2007), American editor of National Geographic magazine
- John J. Mitchell (banker) (1853–1927), Chicago-based banker, president of the Illinois Trust and Savings Bank
- Jack Mitchell (banker) (1897–1985), American banker, co-founder of United Airlines
- John Mitchell (merchant) (1786–1881), Glasgow cork merchant and ship owner

== Military ==
- John Mitchell (British Army officer) (1785–1859), British Army officer and author
- John Mitchell (Medal of Honor), American Indian Wars soldier and Medal of Honor recipient; see Company I, 5th US Infantry
- John Mitchell (RAF officer) (1888–1964)
- John G. Mitchell (general) (1838–1894), American Civil War general
- John J. Mitchell (Medal of Honor) (1846–1898), American Indian Wars soldier and Medal of Honor recipient; see Company L, 8th US Cavalry
- John K. Mitchell (1811–1889), Confederate Navy commander during the American Civil War; see USS Alpha (1864)
- John Lewis Mitchell (1918–2016), RAF Air Commodore
- John R. C. Mitchell, US naval aviator; see June 1955
- John W. Mitchell (United States Air Force) (1915–1995), US Air Force officer, flying ace and the leader of Operation Vengeance
- John Wesley Mitchell (1891–1969), Australian soldier
- John Merrill (Medal of Honor) (1846–1883), American Indian Wars soldier and Medal of Honor recipient

== Politics ==
=== Canada ===
- John F. Mitchell (1862–1943), Conservative member of the Legislative Assembly of Manitoba (1907–10), alderman and acting mayor (1900) of Winnipeg, Manitoba
- John William Mitchell (1872–1952), mayor (1911–13) and alderman (1905–11, 1915) of Calgary, Alberta
- John Henry Mitchell, Canadian politician, Liberal-Progressive member of the Legislative Assembly of Ontario (1926–29)
- John Mitchell (Ontario politician), first president and de facto leader of the Ontario Co-operative Commonwealth Federation (1934–1941), alderman of Hamilton, Ontario

=== United Kingdom ===
- John Mitchell (MP for City of London) (died 1445), member of the medieval Parliament of England (numerous parliaments between 1411 and 1435)
- John Mitchell (MP for Truro), member of the Tudor period Parliament of England (the parliament of 1563–1567)
- John Mitchell (Hull politician) (c. 1781–1859), member of parliament for Kingston-upon-Hull (1818–26)
- John Mitchel (1815–1875), Irish nationalist journalist and politician, member of parliament for County Tipperary (1875)
- J. T. W. Mitchell (John Thomas Whitehead Mitchell, 1828–1895), British co-operative activist who served as president of the 1879 and 1892 Co-operative Congress

=== United States ===
- John Mitchell (Pennsylvania politician) (1781–1849), US congressman from Pennsylvania
- John Mitchell (Wisconsin politician, born 1841) (1841–1924), Wisconsin state legislator
- John Mitchell (labor leader) (1870–1919), American labor leader, president of the United Mine Workers of America
- John Mitchell Jr. (politician) or "Larry" (born 1954), American politician and member of the Delaware House of Representatives
- John H. Mitchell (1835–1905), American politician and senator from Oregon
- John H. Mitchell (Iowa politician) (1899–1992), Iowa state representative and attorney general
- John I. Mitchell (1838–1907), US senator from Pennsylvania
- John Joseph Mitchell (1873–1925), US representative from Massachusetts
- John L. Mitchell (1842–1904), US senator from Wisconsin and father of Gen. Billy Mitchell
- John M. Mitchell (1858–1905), US representative from New York
- John N. Mitchell (1913–1988), US attorney general and Nixon Watergate conspirator
- John O. Mitchell (1858–1921), American politician, mayor of Tulsa
- John Purroy Mitchel (1879–1918), mayor of New York
- John Ridley Mitchell (1877–1962), US representative from Tennessee

=== Other countries ===
- John Mitchell (Australian politician) (1869–1943), member of the Victorian Parliament
- John Walker Mitchell (1832–1914), Scottish-born New Zealand politician

== Science ==
- John Mitchell (geographer) (1711–1768), colonial American physician, botanist, and geographer
- John Kearsley Mitchell (1798–1858), American physician
- John Mitchell (physicist) (1913–2007), New Zealand born physicist
- J. Murray Mitchell (1928–1990), American climatologist
- John F. B. Mitchell (born 1948), British climatologist/climate modeller
- John C. Mitchell, computer scientist
- John Mitchell (chemist), American chemist and materials scientist

== Sports ==
=== Baseball ===
- John Mitchell (outfielder) (1937–2020), Negro league outfielder
- John Mitchell (pitcher) (born 1965), Major League Baseball pitcher, 1986–1990
- Johnny Mitchell (baseball) (1894–1965), shortstop, 1921–1925

=== Ice hockey ===
- John Mitchell (ice hockey, born 1895) (1895–1957), Canadian ice hockey player with the Regina Capitals and Duluth Hornets
- John Mitchell (ice hockey, born 1985), National Hockey League player with the Colorado Avalanche

=== Other sports ===
- John Mitchell (administrator), president of the Melbourne Football Club and the Melbourne Cricket Club
- John Mitchell (American football) (born 1951), player and coach
- John Mitchell (Australian footballer) (1891–1962), Australian rules footballer
- John Mitchell (cricketer) (born 1947), New Zealand cricketer
- John Mitchell (footballer, died 1938) (fl. 1879–1891), footballer for Doncaster Rovers, Newton Heath and Bolton Wanderers
- John Mitchell (footballer, born 1952), English footballer
- John Mitchell (hurler) (born 1946), Irish retired hurler and manager
- John Mitchell (rugby union) (born 1964), rugby player and coach
- John T. Mitchell (1854–1914), whist and bridge player
- Johnny Mitchell (born 1971), American football tight end

== Other people ==
- John Mitchell (historian) (1941–2021), New Zealand historian
- John Murray Mitchell (missionary) (1815–1904), Scottish missionary and orientalist
- John Mitchell (Being Human), a character in the television series Being Human
- John Matthew Mitchell (1925–2019), assistant director-general, British Council
- John Mitchell Mitchell (1789–1865), Scottish antiquarian
- John R. Mitchell (judge) (1861–1939), justice of the Washington Supreme Court

== Other uses ==
- SS John Mitchell (1906), an American lake freighter
- SS John Mitchell (1942), a Liberty ship
- John Purroy Mitchel (fireboat), a New York City Fire Department fireboat

== See also ==
- Jon Mitchell (disambiguation)
- John Michel (disambiguation)
- John Michell (disambiguation)
- John Mitchels (disambiguation)
- Jack Mitchell (disambiguation)
- Jackie Mitchell (disambiguation)
- Jonathan Mitchell (disambiguation)
- Joni Mitchell (born 1943), Canadian singer-songwriter and artist
