= Johnny Mitchell (disambiguation) =

Johnny Mitchell (born 1971) is an American former football player.

Johnny Mitchell may also refer to:

- Johnny Mitchell (baseball)
- Johnny Mitchell (ice hockey)
- Jonny Mitchell, reality TV participant

== See also ==
- John Mitchell (disambiguation)
- Jon Mitchell (disambiguation)
- Jonathan Mitchell (disambiguation)
- Joni Mitchell
