= SS John Mitchell =

SS John Mitchell may refer to the following ships:

- SS John Mitchell (1906), American lake freighter
- SS John Mitchell (1942), American Liberty ship
