= John R. Mitchell =

John R. Mitchell may refer to:

- John R. Mitchell (judge) (1861–1939), justice of the Washington Supreme Court
- John R. Mitchell (poet) (1940–2006), American poet and a professor of English
- John Ridley Mitchell (1877–1962), United States Representative from Tennessee
- John Robert Mitchell (fl. 1970s–2000s), president of the Melbourne Football Club

== See also ==
- John Mitchell (disambiguation)
