= Convention of Alessandria =

1800 Treaty during the War of the Second Coalition

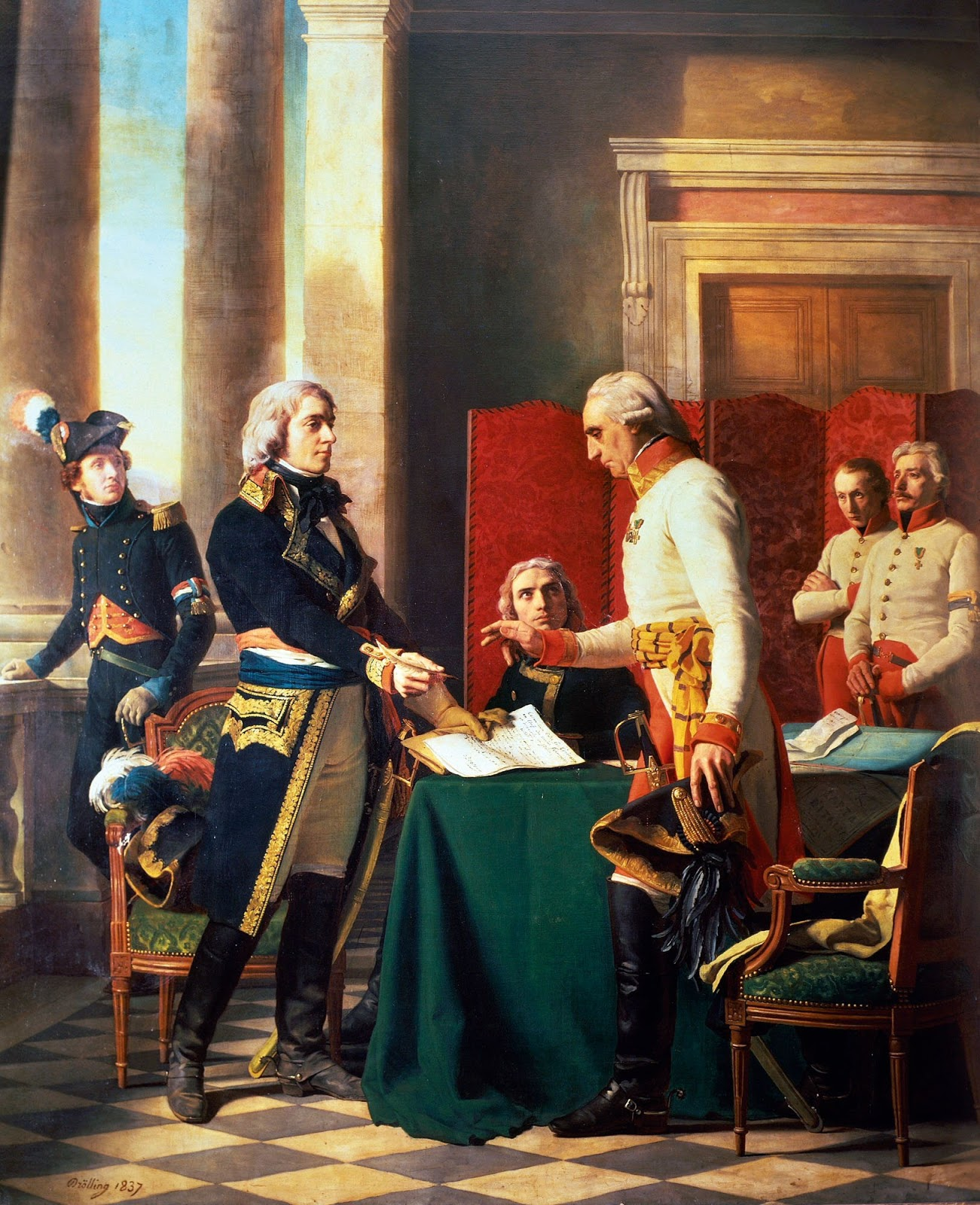
- Signing of the Convention of Alexandria (by Michel Martin Drolling)
- Context: after the defeat of the Archduchy of Austria by the French First Republic in the War of the Second Coalition
- Signed: 15 June 1800
- Location: Alessandria
- Parties: French First Republic (Habsburg monarchy) Austria

Full text
- Convention of Alessandria at Wikisource

The Convention of Alessandria (also known as the Armistice of Marengo) was an armistice signed on 15 June 1800 between the French First Republic led by Napoleon and Austria during the War of the Second Coalition. Following the Austrian defeat at the Battle of Marengo, they agreed to evacuate Italy as far as the Mincio and abandon strongholds in Piedmont and Milan. Great Britain and Austria were allies and hoped to negotiate a peace treaty with France, but Napoleon insisted on separate treaties with each nation. The negotiations failed, and fighting resumed on 22 November 1800.

== Background ==
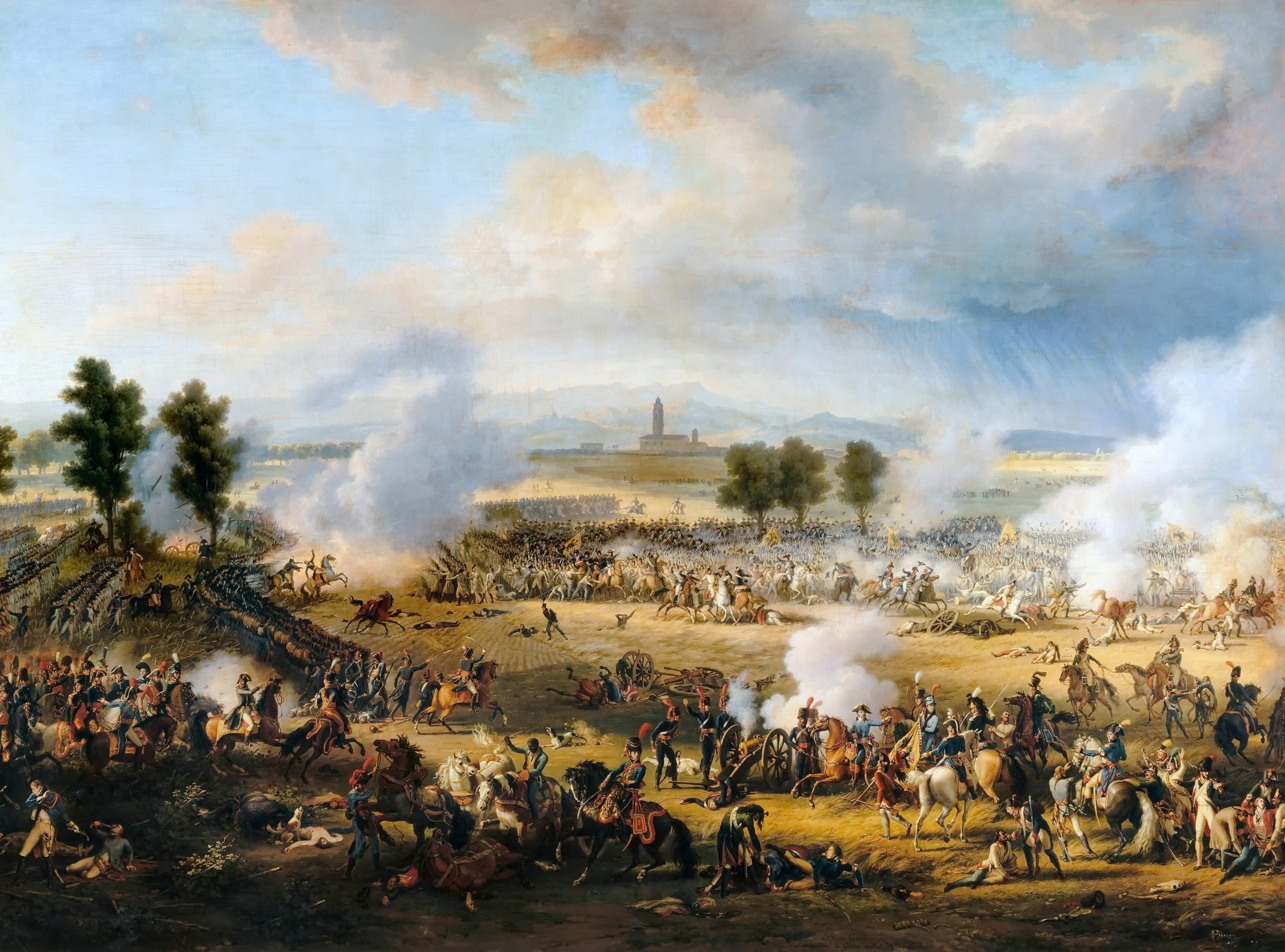
The Battle of Marengo by Louis-François Lejeune, 1801

The War of the Second Coalition was the second war against revolutionary France by various European monarchies. The Second Coalition was led by Britain, Austria and Russia, and included the Ottoman Empire, Portugal, Naples, various German monarchies and several other minor European states. Its aim was to contain the expansion of the French Republic and to restore the monarchy in France.

French troops returned to Italy in 1799, following a brief period of absence which had precipitated the collapse of their Italian client republics. Napoleon Bonaparte, who had seized power in the Coup of 18 Brumaire, carried out a crossing of the Alps with his Army of the Reserve (officially commanded by Louis-Alexandre Berthier) in May 1800. This move, made almost before the passes were open, threatened Austrian General Michael von Melas' lines of communications in northern Italy. The French army then seized Milan on 2 June, followed by Pavia, Piacenza and Stradella, cutting the main Austrian supply route eastward along the south bank of the Po river. Bonaparte hoped that Melas' preoccupation with the Siege of Genoa, held by French General André Masséna, would prevent the Austrians from responding to his offensive. However, Masséna surrendered the town on 4 June, freeing a large number of Austrians for operations against the French.

On 9 June French General Jean Lannes beat Austrian Feldmarschallleutnant Peter Ott in the Battle of Montebello. Bonaparte subsequently convinced himself that Melas would not attack and, further, that the Austrians were about to retreat. As other French forces closed from the west and south, the Austrian commander had withdrawn most of his troops from their positions near Nice and Genoa to Alessandria on the main Turin-Mantua road. The Battle of Marengo was fought on 14 June 1800 between Bonaparte and Melas near Alessandria. Towards the end of the day, the French overcame the Austrian surprise attack.

== Convention ==
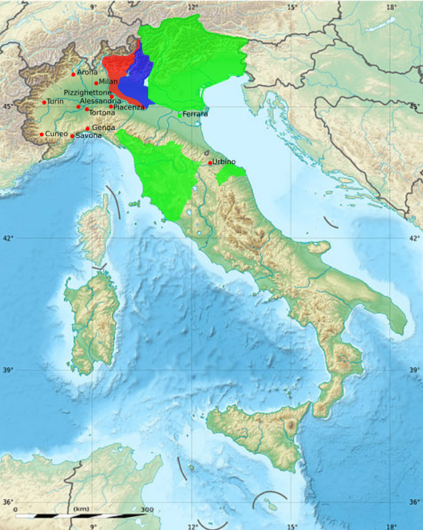
Land ceded by the Convention of Alessandria Ceded to France Neutral territory Retained by Austria

At 4:00 am on 15 June 1800, von Melas sent General Johann Ferdinand von Skal and two captains to the French encampment with a flag of surrender. Napoleon, who had expected the Austrians to continue fighting, quickly accepted the surrender. A cease-fire was signed a few hours later. In the agreement, the Austrians agreed to evacuate to the left bank of the Bormida, and that hostilities would cease for forty-eight hours. The Austrians initially hoped to give up only Piedmont and Genoa, but Napoleon demanded they retreat to behind the Po and Mincio. The final agreement was formalized and signed as the Convention of Alessandria.

On 15 June, the convention was signed. It caused the fighting to end, and the Austrians agreed to evacuate Italy as far as the Mincio and abandon all of their strongholds in the Piedmont and Milan, losing all that they had gained in 1798 and 1799. The Austrians agreed to give the French Tortona, Alessandria, Milan, Turin, Pizzighetone, Arona, and Piacenza by 20 June. They agreed to surrender by 24 June the fortress of Coni, the castles of Seva and Savona, and the city of Genoa; and the city of Urbino by 26 June. The land between the Chiesa, the Oglio, and the Po rivers was ceded to the French, and that between the Chiesa and the Mincio was designated a neutral zone, not to "be occupied by either of the two armies." The Austrians retained control of Tuscany, and the bulk of their army, with the French letting their soldiers retreat.

== Aftermath ==
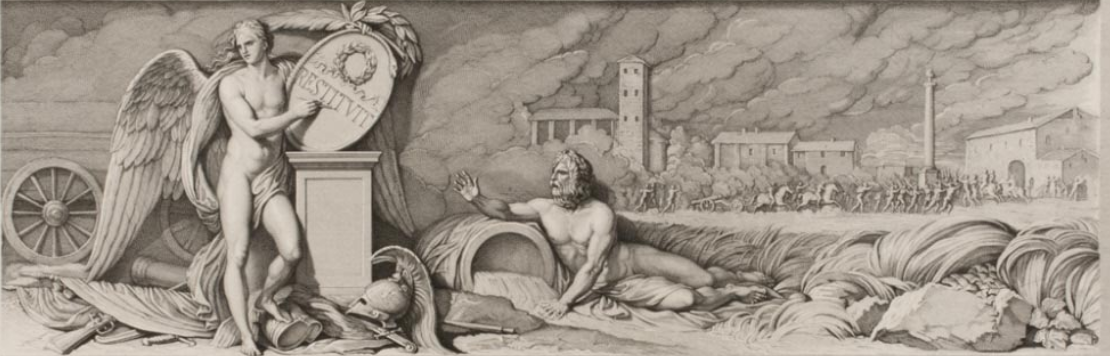
Allegory Representing the Convention of Alessandria after Napoleon's Victory at the Battle of Marengo by Giuseppe Longhi

On 17 June, Napoleon left for Paris after the signing of the convention. He stopped in Milan that same day, and was greeted as a hero, with large crowds celebrating his arrival. The Cisalpine Republic was again established as a French client republic, and a temporary government was put in place until the signing of a peace treaty with Austria. Many strongholds listed in the convention were given up by the Austrians and their fortifications dismantled by the French, including Genoa on 24 June. Napoleon left Milan the same day, and stopped briefly in Turin and Lyon before arriving in Paris on 2 July. The victory consolidated Napoleon's political position in Paris as First Consul. French historian François Furet noted that the battle served as "the true coronation of [Napoleon's] power and his regime".

General Officer Count Joseph Saint-Julien was sent to deliver the convention to Francis II, (Note: With a note from Napoleon, expressing his desire for a more permanent peace treaty.) and it was soon ratified by the Court of Vienna. It proved to be only a temporary cease-fire, as Johann Amadeus von Thugut (and the Austrian government) refused to accept the terms and give up any of Austria's Italian holdings. Francis II, several hours before receiving the convention on 20 June 1800, had signed a treaty with Britain, in which Britain agreed to give Austria two million pounds sterling in exchange for Austria continuing the war with France. The treaty also prohibited negotiations between Austria and France without the involvement of Britain before 1 February 1801.

Austria soon dispatched Saint-Julien to travel to Paris, carrying news of the treaty's ratification, and to further consider the terms of it. (Note: Saint-Julien was sent to placate Napoleon and buy time for the Austrians, and had been instructed not to negotiate so as to avoid angering Britain. He had a letter from the Austrians, addressed to Napoleon that contained "a ratification of the armistice both in Italy and Germany, and invited explanations in reference to the bases of future negotiation.") He arrived on 21 July and began negotiations. On 22 July he attended a meeting of the Ministry of Foreign Affairs at which Saint-Julien was persuaded to assume the position of an accredited diplomat and sign several preliminary articles on 28 July. Saint-Julien and Géraud Duroc were dispatched to deliver the news to Vienna. On 4 August, they arrived at Alt Oettiugen, the headquarters of Paul Kray. The negotiations were disavowed by Austria due to their treaty with Britain. Duroc was turned away and Saint-Julien was arrested for negotiating without instructions. On 29 September, the Convention of Castiglione was signed, extending the Convention of Alessandria; but further negotiations at Lunéville were fruitless, as Napoleon demanded separate peace treaties with England and Austria. On 22 November 1800 hostilities resumed.

== Historical opinion ==
British general and military historian John Mitchell argued in 1846 that the French would have accepted many fewer concessions and wrote that "nothing equal to this ill-fated convention had ever been known in military history." The treaty was described by British historian Thomas Henry Dyer in 1877 as "one of the most disgraceful capitulations in history." Historian David Bell concluded in 2014 that a bulk of the Austrian army had survived the Battle of Marengo, and Melas was still in a position that he could have continued fighting. Prussian historian Dietrich Heinrich von Bülow, "the keenest contemporary observer of the 1800 campaign," said of the convention: "Bonaparte did not seize success; Melas threw it away." According to historian David Hollins, the victory allowed Napoleon to "secure his political power for the next 14 years."

== Bibliography ==
- Arnold, James R. (1999). Marengo & Hohenlinden: Napoleon's Rise to Power. J.R. Arnold. ISBN 9780967098500.
- Bell, David A. (2014). The First Total War: Napoleon's Europe and the Birth of Warfare as We Know It. Houghton Mifflin Harcourt. ISBN 9780547525297.
- Birchall, James (1876). England Under the Revolution and the House of Hanover 1688 to 1820. Simpkin, Marshall and Co. OCLC 862126804.
- Bright, James Franck (1837). A History of England. E.P. Dutton.
- Chandler, David (1973) [1966]. The Campaigns of Napoleon. Scribner. ISBN 9780025236608. OCLC 740560411.
- Clarke, Hewson (1816). The History of the War: From the Commencement of the French ..., Volume 1. T. Kinnersley. OCLC 656982611.
- Deans, William (1882). A History of France From the Earliest Times to the Present Day. A. Fullarton. OCLC 824689081.
- Dwyer, Philip (2013). Citizen Emperor: Napoleon in Power. Yale University Press. ISBN 9780300212532.
- Dyer, Thomas Henry (1877). Modern Europe. George Bell and Sons. OCLC 765956573.
- Hollins, David (2006). "Battle of Marengo" in The Encyclopedia of the French Revolutionary and Napoleonic War. ABC-CLIO. ISBN 1-85109-646-9
- Hollins, David (2005). Marengo 1800: Napoleon's Day of Fate. Praeger. ISBN 9780275986254.
- Knight, Charles (1814). A History of England Volume 7: 1760–1814. Bradbury, Evans.
- Sainsbury, Geoffrey (1936). The Profits of War Through the Ages. Translated by Richard Lewinsohn. George Routledge & Sons Ltd.
- Massey, William Nathaniel (1865). A History of England During the Reign of George the Third. 4, 1795–1801. Longmans, Green. OCLC 315804528.
- Mitchell, John (January 1846). "Principal Campaigns in the Rise of Napoleon". Fraser's Magazine for Town and Country. Vol. 33.
- Ritchie, Thomas Edward (1802). Political and Military Memoirs of Europe: From the Renewal of War on the Continent in 1798, to the Peace of Amiens in 1802: With an Introductory View of the Treaty of Camp-Formio, and Proceedngs of the Congress at Rastadt ... T. Maccliesh. OCLC 6609990.
- Ryan, Edward (2003). Napoleon's Shield & Guardian: The Unconquerable General Daumesnil. Frontline Books. ISBN 9781853675539.
- Thiers, Adolphe; Marie, Joseph L. (1846). Thiers' History of the Consulate, and Empire of Napoleon. Translated by W. Stapleton. Houlston & Stoneman.

Preceded by Battle of Marengo	French Revolution: Revolutionary campaigns Convention of Alessandria	Succeeded by Battle of Hohenlinden
