= Jack Mitchell =

Jack Mitchell may refer to:

- Jack Mitchell (author), American businessman, author, and motivational speaker
- Jack Mitchell (American football) (1923–2009), American football player and coach
- Jack Mitchell (Australian footballer, born 1911) (1911–1963), Australian footballer for Hawthorn
- Jack Mitchell (Australian footballer, born 1924) (1924–1978), Australian footballer for Melbourne
- Jack Mitchell (banker) (1897–1985), American banker and airline founder
- Jack Mitchell (drummer), drummer of British indie band Haven
- Jack Mitchell (character), recurring fictional character in the short stories of Henry Lawson
- Jack Mitchell (jockey), English jockey
- Jack Mitchell (photographer) (1925–2013), American photographer and author of dance, and iconic artist images
- Jack Mitchell (racing driver), British racing driver
- Jack Mitchell (jazz historian), Australian jazz historian and discographer
- Jack Mitchell, the protagonist in the 2014 video game Call Of Duty: Advanced Warfare

== See also ==
- Jackie Mitchell (disambiguation)
- John Mitchell (disambiguation)
