= John Michell (disambiguation) =

John Michell (1724–1793) was an English scientist.

John Michell may also refer to:

- John Mitchell (minister) (1794–1870), American minister and author
- John Henry Michell (1863–1940), Australian mathematician
- John Michell (writer) (1933–2009), English writer on esotericism
- John Ralph Michell (1861–1947), Canadian politician
- John Michell, List of Lord Mayors of London#15th century
- John Michell (MP for New Shoreham) (died 1546), English politician
- John Michell (MP for Horsham) (died 1555), MP for Horsham
- Sir John Michell (British Army officer) (1781–1866), Royal Artillery general
- John Michell (MP for City of London), represented City of London (Parliament of England constituency)

== See also ==
- John Michel (disambiguation)
- John Michels (born 1973), American football offensive tackle
- John Michels (guard) (born 1931)
- John Mitchell (disambiguation)
