= John Michels (disambiguation) =

John Michels (born 1973) is an American football player.

It may also refer to:

- John Michels (guard) (1931–2019), American football player
- John Michels (politician), South African politician

== See also ==
- John Michel (disambiguation)
