= Kate Kelly (shipwreck) =

Two-masted schooner that sank in Lake Michigan

- Kate Kelly (Shipwreck)
- U.S. National Register of Historic Places
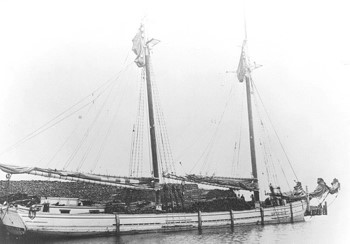
- The Kate Kelly prior to her sinking

- Location within Wisconsin
- Location: Off the coast of Wind Point, Wisconsin
- Coordinates: 42°46′48″N 87°43′31″W
- NRHP reference No.: 07001219
- Added to NRHP: November 21, 2007

The Kate Kelly was a 126-foot wood-hulled two-masted schooner that sank in 1895 off the coast of Wind Point, Wisconsin, United States. In 2007 the shipwreck site was added to the National Register of Historic Places.

== History ==
The Kate Kelly was built in Tonawanda, New York by John Martel in 1867, a canaller designed to carry maximum cargo through the Welland Canal between Lakes Erie and Ontario, with inches to spare. Her homeport was Buffalo, New York and later Oswego, New York. She carried cargo such as corn, grain, coal and iron from ports including those in Chicago, Illinois and Milwaukee, Wisconsin to ports in places such as Canada.

In May 1895 the Kate Kelly left Alpena, Michigan with a load of hemlock railroad ties bound for Chicago. After stopping at Sheboygan, Wisconsin, she carried on with her journey. On the morning of May 13, a storm broke out across Lake Michigan, sinking several ships including the Kate Kelly. There were no survivors and the bodies of the crew were never found.

The ship lies two miles east of Wind Point Light in 55 feet of water, broken up in sections on the lakebed.
