= Racine North Breakwater Light =

Lighthouse in Racine, Wisconsin

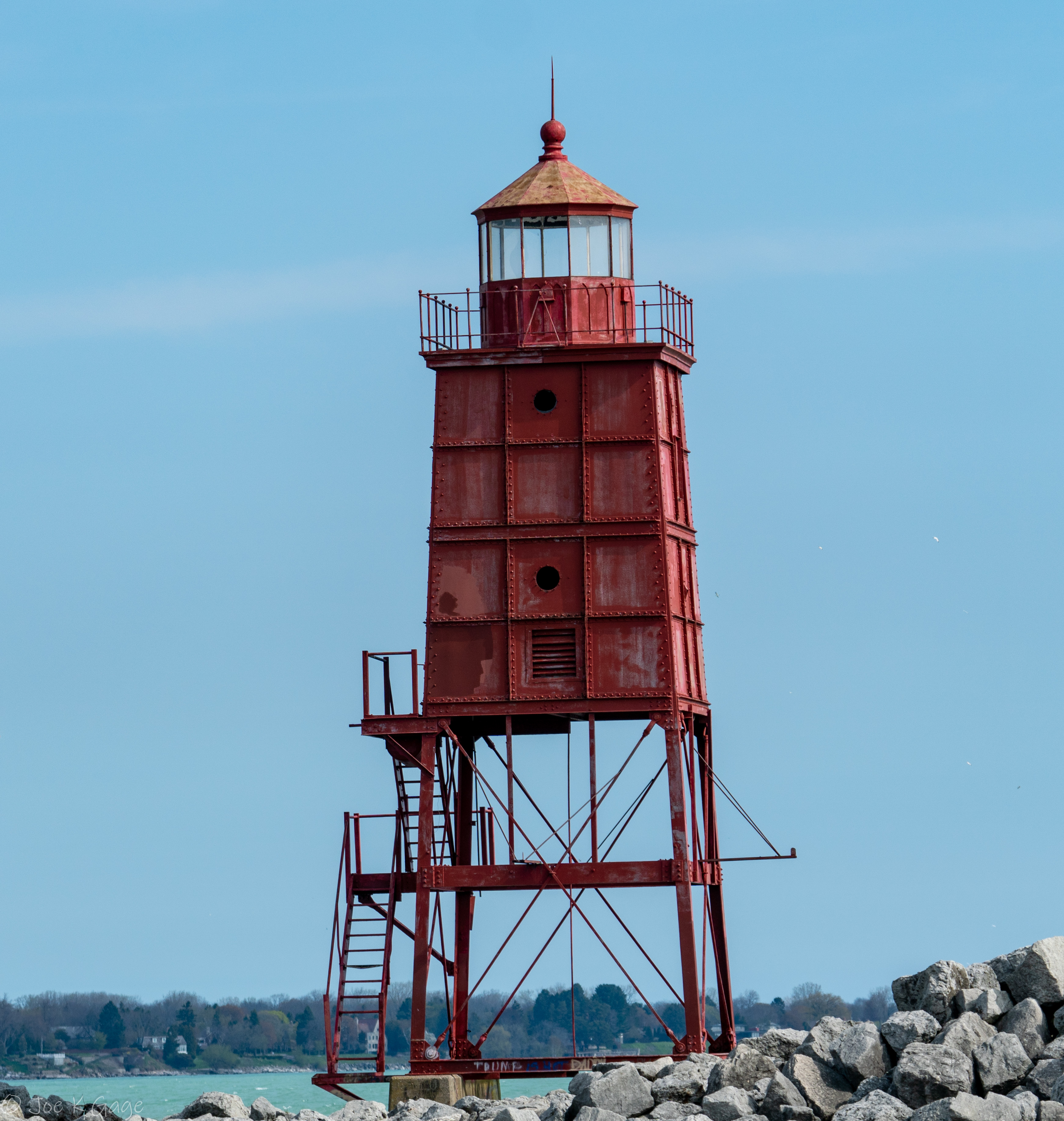
- Racine North Breakwater Light c. 2020
- Location: Lake Michigan east of Racine
- Coordinates: 42°44′4.56″N 87°46′19.2″W

Tower
- Constructed: 1901
- Foundation: Concrete pier
- Construction: Metal
- Automated: 1933
- Height: 46 feet (14 m)
- Shape: metal structure with a hexagonal lantern room

Light
- First lit: 1901
- Deactivated: 1987
- Focal height: 48 ft (15 m)
- Lens: fourth order Fresnel lens

The Racine North Breakwater Light is a lighthouse located on Lake Michigan, connected via breakwater to Racine, Wisconsin. The light was deactivated in 1987 yet still stands in its original location, now a tourist destination.

== History ==
In 1901, the fourth order Fresnel lens from the Racine Harbor Lighthouse was removed and placed in a new metal tower on the northern end of the harbor pier. This new metal tower was then named the Racine North Breakwater Light, completed November 23, 1901. The structure was made entirely of metal and painted completely white save for the lantern room which housed the Fresnel lens. In 1904 a 1,500 pounds (680 kg) fog bell was mounted to the lighthouse, and the lantern room was finally constructed, a hexagonal pyramidal tower.

In 1933, 18,000 feet (5,500 m) of telephone cables were laid down between Racine and the breakwater, allowing for the tower to be automated from the shore. In 1987, the lighthouse was scheduled to be torn down, but a public outcry stopped the demolition.

== See also ==
- Racine Reef Light
- Wind Point Light
