= Wind Point Light =

Lighthouse in Wind Point, Wisconsin

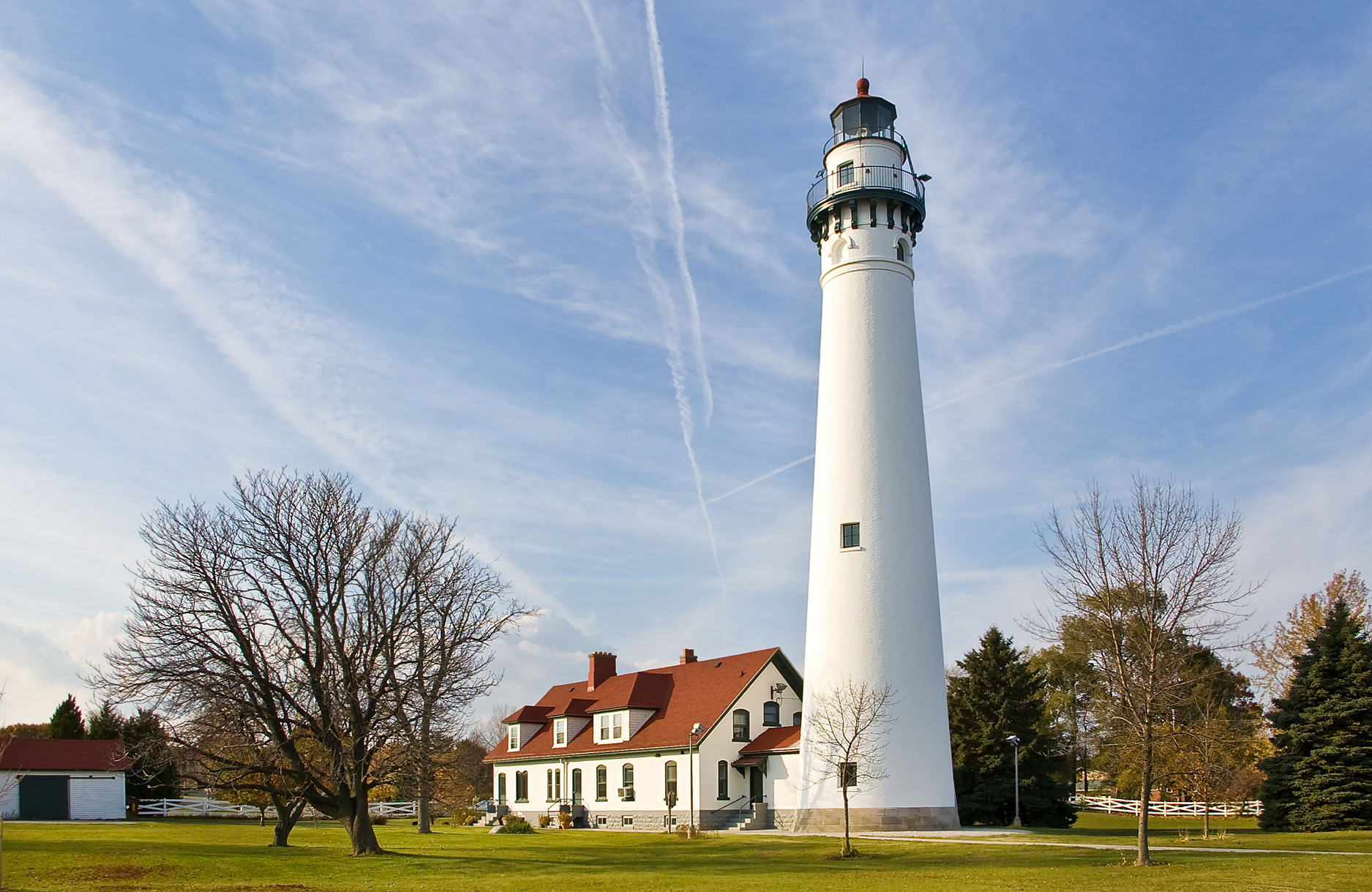
- Wind Point Lighthouse
- Location: Wind Point, Wisconsin
- Coordinates: 42°45′52.122″N 87°45′29.995″W

Tower
- Construction: brick, Italianate bracketing
- Automated: 1964
- Height: 108 feet (33 m)
- Heritage: National Register of Historic Places listed place

Light
- First lit: 1880
- Lens: Third Order Fresnel
- Range: 21 nautical miles (39 km; 24 mi)
- Historic Lighthouse
- U.S. National Register of Historic Places
- Architect: Orlando Metcalfe Poe
- NRHP reference No.: 84003780
- Added to NRHP: 1984

Wind Point Lighthouse (or Windpoint Light Station) is a lighthouse located at the north end of Racine Harbor in the U.S. state of Wisconsin. It is in the village of Wind Point, Wisconsin, on Lighthouse Road, next to the Shoop Park golf course. The lighthouse stands 108 feet (33 m) tall. One of the oldest and tallest active lighthouses on the Great Lakes, it was listed on the National Register of Historic Places in 1984.

== History ==
Racine harbor had its first lighthouse in 1837, but that light was not visible to ships approaching from the north, blocked by Racine Point, three and a half miles to the north. As a result, the Lighthouse Board recommended in 1870 the building of a lighthouse on Wind Point itself. Congress appropriated the money in 1877 and the lighthouse entered service in 1880.

Wind Point Lighthouse was designed by Orlando Metcalfe Poe, a former Brigadier General in the Civil War. The lighthouse was constructed in 1880. It was lit for the first time on November 15, 1880. The beacon was originally powered by a three-wicked kerosene lamp, magnified by a third-order Fresnel lens. The light was electrified in 1924, and replaced a DCB-24R airport beacon in 1964. The DCB-24R failed in 2007, and was replaced by a VRB-25 lens. A signal house (horns removed, resonators still in place) remains on the grounds as well as a garage, two storage buildings, and an oil house. The Village of Wind Point has maintained the lighthouse and grounds since 1964, and uses the old keepers' quarters as a village hall and police headquarters. The park and lighthouse were transferred from the U.S. coast guard to the Village of Wind Point in 1997, with the requirement that it be maintained as a historical landmark. The lighthouse is open to tour on certain dates.

In the summer of 2007, the lighthouse tower underwent a US$210,000 restoration, during which windows and doors were replaced, brickwork repointed, and the tower repainted.

The shipwreck site of the Kate Kelly is located 2 miles (3.2 km) east of the lighthouse.

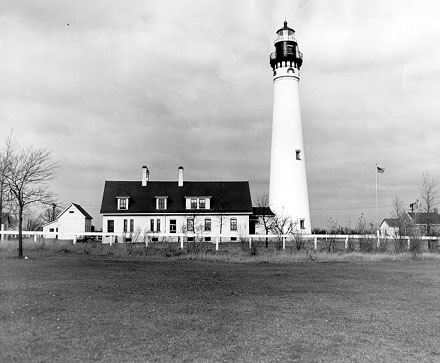
USCG archive photo

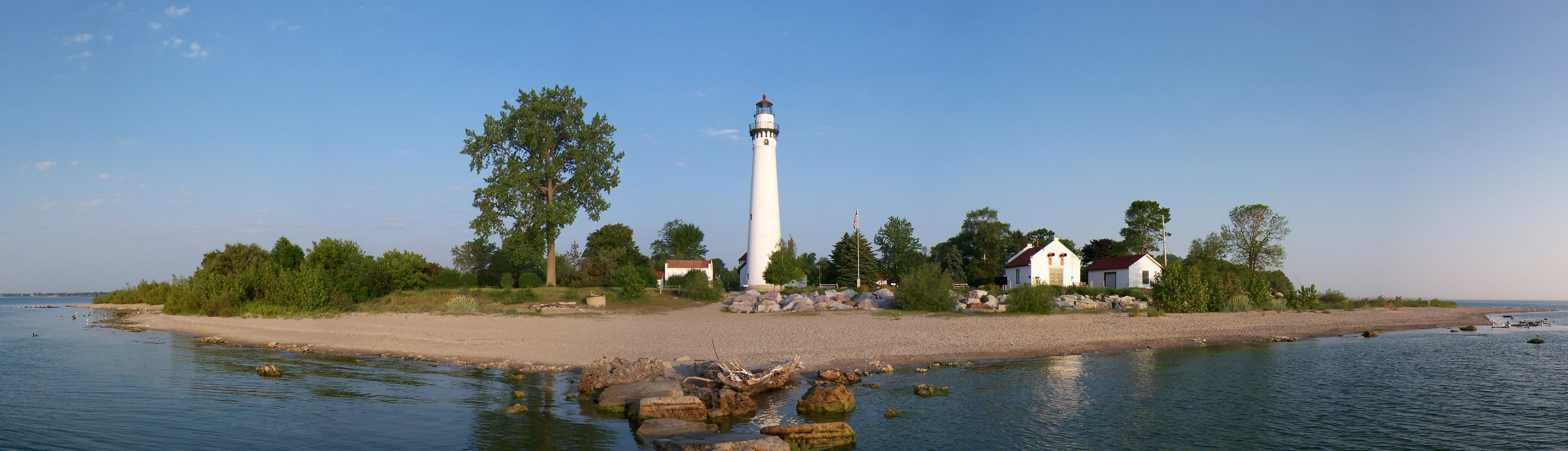
The Wind Point Lighthouse and surroundings at sunrise

== See also ==
- Racine Reef Light
- Racine Harbor Lighthouse and Life Saving Station
- Racine North Breakwater Light

== Specialized further reading ==
- Havighurst, Walter (1943) The Long Ships Passing: The Story of the Great Lakes, Macmillan Publishers.
- Oleszewski, Wes, Great Lakes Lighthouses, American and Canadian: A Comprehensive Directory/Guide to Great Lakes Lighthouses, (Gwinn, Michigan: Avery Color Studios, Inc., 1998) ISBN 0-932212-98-0.
- Pepper, Terry. "Seeing the Light: Lighthouses on the western Great Lakes".
- Sapulski, Wayne S., (2001) Lighthouses of Lake Michigan: Past and Present (Paperback) (Fowlerville: Wilderness Adventure Books) ISBN 0-923568-47-6; ISBN 978-0-923568-47-4.
- Taylor, Paul (October 2009) Orlando M. Poe: Civil War General and Great Lakes Engineer (Kent State University Press) ISBN 1-60635-040-4; ISBN 978-1-60635-040-9.
- Wright, Larry and Wright, Patricia, Great Lakes Lighthouses Encyclopedia Hardback (Erin: Boston Mills Press, 2006) ISBN 1-55046-399-3.
