= John Michel (disambiguation) =

John Michel (1804–1886) was a British Army officer.

John Michel may also refer to:

- John B. Michel, (1917–1969), science fiction author, member of the Futurians
- John Michel (television), director of at least two episodes of the TV series Scrubs
- John Michel (1660-1739), MP for Sandwich between 1698 and 1713
- John Michel (British Army officer, born 1765) (1765–1844), British Army general and MP for Belfast 1816–18

== See also ==
- John Michell (disambiguation)
- John Mitchell (disambiguation)
- John Michels (disambiguation)
