= Jackie Mitchell (disambiguation) =

Jackie Mitchell (1913–1987) was an American female baseball player.

Jackie Mitchell may also refer to:

- Jackie Mitchell (gridiron football) (born 1976), American and Canadian football player
- Jackie Mitchell (swimmer), Canadian Paralympic athlete and swimmer
- Jacqui Mitchell (born 1936), American bridge player

== See also ==
- Jack Mitchell (disambiguation)
- Jackie Mittell (1906–1976), Welsh professional footballer
- John Mitchell (disambiguation)
