= Independence (steamboat) =

Propeller-driven steamboat sunk in Lake Superior

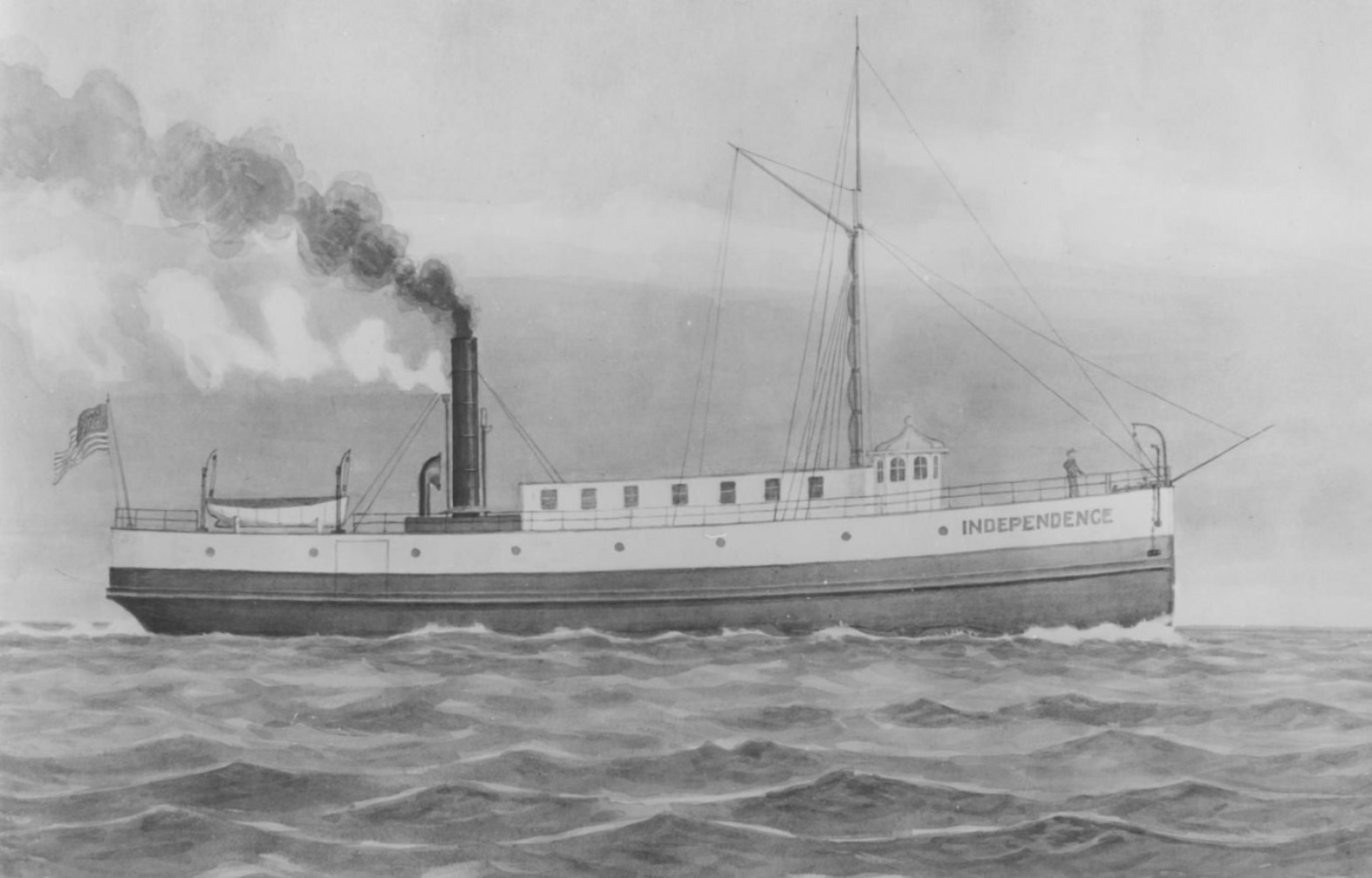
Independence, steamboat

The Independence was a propeller-driven steamboat that was the first steam-driven vessel to run on Lake Superior in October 1845, initiating the era of steam navigation on that lake. During her career, she saw service shipping passengers and supplies to the mining settlements along the south shores of the lake and often returning with copper ore or was commissioned to carry other goods. Her eight-year career on Lake Superior ended when her boilers exploded, killing several aboard, and ultimately sending the steamboat to the bottom in pieces.

== Description ==
The Independence was a wooden hull, steam driven steamboat whose propulsion was effected by means of two rotary steam engines, two screw (Ericson's) propellers, (Note: "Propellers were soon found to be economical ships. They were cheaper to build and operate than side-wheelers. Their machinery was simpler, cheaper, and more compact, so that it left more space for cargo. Screw steam engines burned about one-fourth the fuel of paddle-wheel steamers, and required only half the engine-room crews.") and schooner rigged sails to assist her engines when the winds were effective enough. A single decked vessel, she had a keel of 112 feet (34 m) with a 25 ft (7.6 m) beam, and had a 9 ½ feet hold, and a cargo capacity of 261 tons. In calm weather should could maintain a speed of 4 mph. The Independence was built in 1843 in Chicago, Illinois. She was built by James M. Averill. In 1844 the Independence had her engines modified to burn coal to improve her speed, and her propellers were altered. In 1852 she was outfitted with a new engine and boilers. In 1856, the value of the Independence was assessed at $12,000.

== History ==
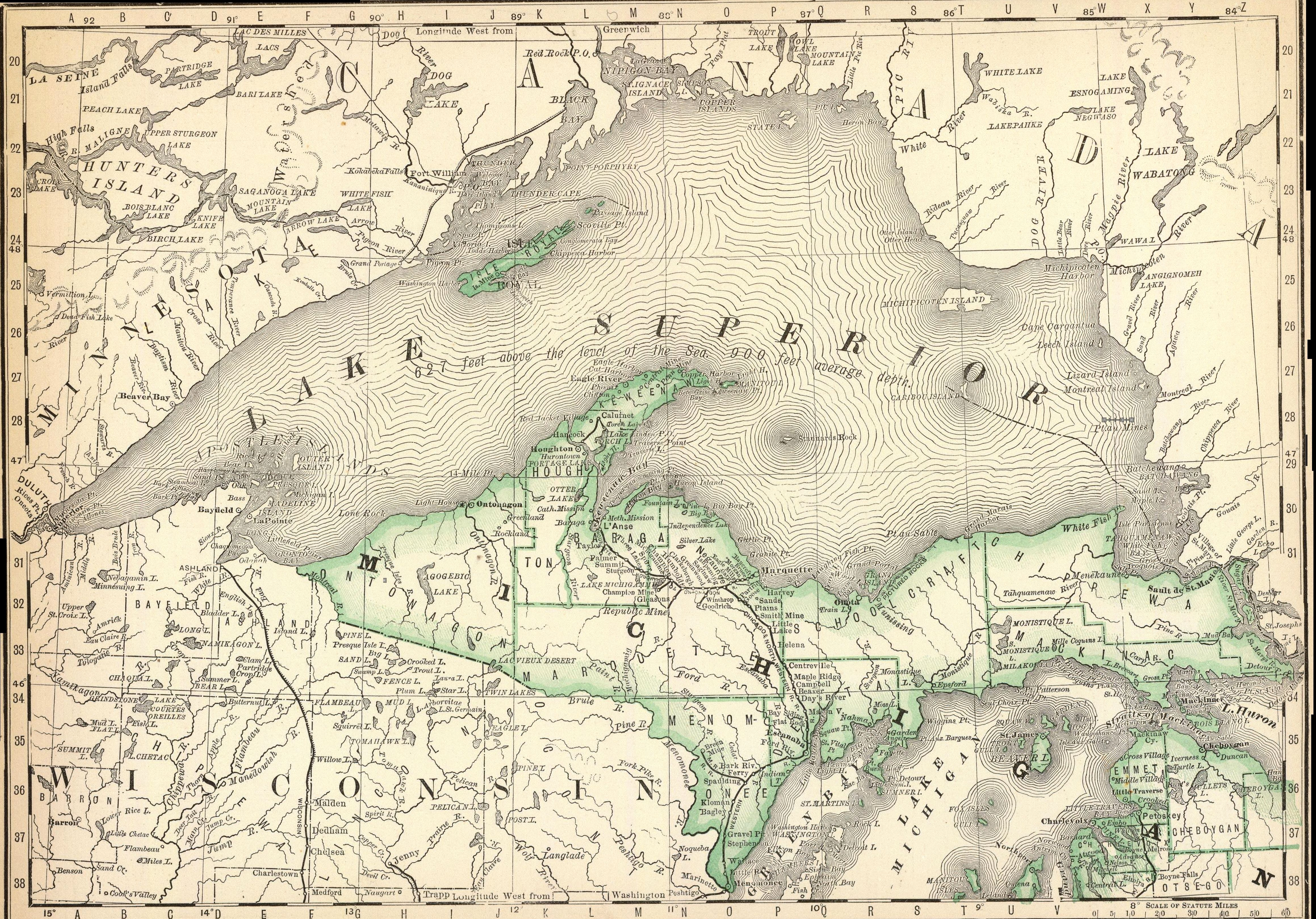
Lake Superior and Northern Michigan Map published 1879 by Rand McNally

Unlike the first steamboat navigation to appear on the lower Great Lakes beginning in 1816, steamboat navigation did not occur on Lake Superior until 1845, prompted by the abundant copper and iron ore deposits which were discovered along its shores a few years before when the region overall was still a wilderness. The mile long turbulent rapids of Saint's Mary's River, connecting Lake Huron with Lake Superior, had always prevented vessels on the lower Great Lakes from venturing up and into Lake Superior. The independence became the first steamer on Lake Michigan in 1845. In 1842, Captain James Averell, a shipbuilder from Maine, established a shipyard on Chicago's North Side, just below the Rush-street bridge, on Lake Michigan. There he commenced construction of the Independence, and by July, 1843 the Independence was ready for running on the lakes. It was the first propeller driven vessel built on Lake Michigan, and the third to run on the lake. In the fall of that year the Independence, commanded by Captain Averill, cruised up Lake Michigan where it arrived at Saint Mary's River at Sault Ste. Marie. Preparations were made to haul the vessel on rollers over the portage running between Lake Huron and Lake Superior, (Note: Lake Superior elevation: 601.71 ft — Lake Huron elevation: 577 ft (above sea-level: See respective articles for general information of the lakes)) around the rapids and falls at Sault Ste. Marie in the same manner as several other sailing vessels before her. Late in October, 1845, after being outfitted for a trip across Lake Superior, the Independence was launched into St. Mary's River above the rapids where she entered Lake Superior, becoming the first steamboat to run on that lake. Her cargo included a large number of kegs filled with blasting powder and supplies for the mining settlements on the Keweenaw Peninsula. The peninsula was discovered to have the largest quantities of pure copper in the world, greatly prompting lake navigation, mining on its shores and commerce. At that time there were few vessels of any kind on Lake Superior, as the Sault Ste. Marie Ship Canal had not been constructed. The Independence cast her anchor above the rapids in May, 1846. At an average speed of 5 mph, the Independence ran on the lake successfully. After the arrival of the Independence the Napoleon came along and were the only two steam vessels on that lake. Both were hauled over the portage alongside and around the rapids of the Saint Mary's river to get to the upper river and to Lake Superior.

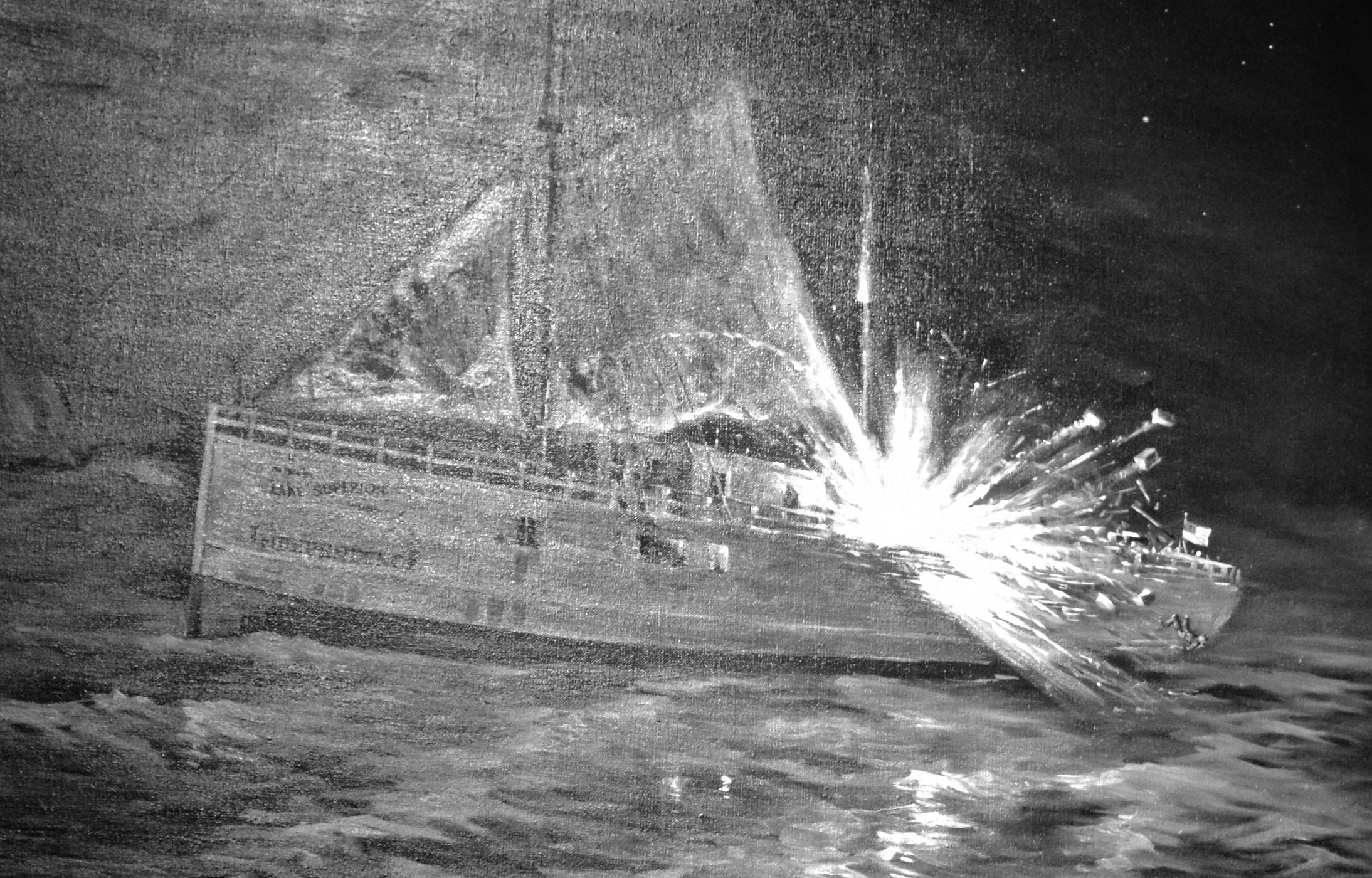
Explosion of the steamer Independence

The Independence spent much of her career bringing miners and supplies to the various copper mines on the south shore of Lake Superior, while often shipping copper ore across the lake. Arriving from Detroit, on June 11, 1848, the famous newspaper editor Horace Greeley boarded the Independence and cruised to the Keweenaw Peninsula at Eagle Harbor where he had invested in copper mining. From the deck of the Independence, not believing that Lake Superior was too cold to swim in, Greeley leaped from her deck into the lake. Shortly before reaching the north point of the peninsula the steamer encountered gale force head winds, forcing her to take cover by the shore of the jutting peninsula. After dropping anchor Captain Averell waited 28 hours for the winds to subside. By the time they were able to resume their journey, the smoke stack became almost completely clogged from the rain-soaked soot, forcing the craft to move at slow pace the rest of the way to Eagle Harbor. On November 21, 1853 Independence's career was abruptly ended when her boiler exploded on the lake near Sault Ste. Marie. Captain John McKay, left the dock at the Superior-Huron Portage around 12 o'clock, with approximately three dozen passengers, and a heavy freight of winter supplies for Ontonagon and La Point. Departing from Sault Ste. Marie, Independence had proceeded less than a mile, when her boiler burst, reducing a large section of the craft to splinters, killing one passenger. However, the passenger that was killed was not identified. The explosion of the boiler also scalded and injured the second engineer and several passengers. A portion of the vessel remained afloat where the survivors had gathered on the deck. As the wrecked vessel started drifting towards the river, two keel boats finally made it to the wreck and rescued its survivors, saving them from the rocks along the mile long turbulent rapids of Saint Mary's River not far ahead. . (Note: Cargo aboard the vessel, valued at $18,000, was a total loss.) Another crash of the Independence took place as the vessel settled. Overall, there was a property loss of $28,000.

== See also ==
- Ontario (steamboat), the first steamboat to run on Lake Ontario
- Walk-in-the-water (steamboat), first steamboat on Lakes Erie, Huron and Michigan
- Emilie (steamboat), steamboat owned by Joseph LaBarge that broke speed and distance records on the Missouri River in the mid 19th century
- Copper Harbor
- Graveyard of the Great Lakes
- Upper Peninsula of Michigan
- SS Merchant, first iron-hulled merchant ship built on the Great Lakes

== Bibliography ==
- Andreas, Alfred Theodore (1884). History of Chicago. From the earliest period to the present time, Vol I. Chicago, A. T. Andreas.
- Andreas, Alfred Theodore (1885). History of Chicago. From the earliest period to the present time, Vol II. Chicago, A. T. Andreas.
- Bowen, Dana Thomas (1953). GREAT LAKES Ships and Shipping (PDF). Minnesota Historical Society.
- Courter, Ellis W. (2005). Michigan's Copper Country (PDF). DEQ Office of Geological Survey.
- Mansfield, John Brandt (1899). History of the Great Lakes, Vol I. Chicago, Beers.
- Mansfield, John Brandt (1899). History of the Great Lakes, Vol II. Chicago, Beers.{ History of the Great Lakes )
- "Maritime History of the Great Lakes: Independence (Propeller), boiler exploded, 21 Nov 1853".
- Labadie, Patrick; Agranat, Brina J.; Anfinson, Scott. Minnesota's Lake Superior Shipwrecks. Minnesota Historical Society: History and Development of Great Lakes Water Craft.
- Lankton, Larry D. (1997). Beyond the Boundaries: Life and Landscape at the Lake Superior Copper Mines, 1840-1875. Oxford University Press. ISBN 978-0-1951-0804-0.
- Ralph, Julian (1890). Lake Superior along the south shore. New York, Press of American bank note co.
- "INDEPENDENCE (1843, Propeller)". Alpena County George N. Fletcher Public Library; Northeast Michigan Oral History and Historic Photograph Archive. 2019.

=== Further reading ===
- Risjord, Norman K. (2008). Shining Big Sea Water: The Story of Lake Superior. Minnesota Historical Society. ISBN 978-0-8735-1590-0.

External links

- Illustration of the Independence
- Propeller of the Independence
- Nautical Map of Saint Mary's River
