= Jon Mitchell =

Jon Mitchell may refer to:

- Jon Mitchell (meteorologist), British metereoligist
- Jon Mitchell (journalist), Welsh journalist in Japan, author, poet
- Jon Mitchell (ice hockey), played in 2010–11 SIJHL season
- Jon Mitchell (politician), American lawyer & politician

== See also ==
- Jonathan Mitchell (disambiguation)
- John Mitchell (disambiguation)
- Johnny Mitchell (disambiguation)
