= Racine Reef Light =

Racine Reef Light #12
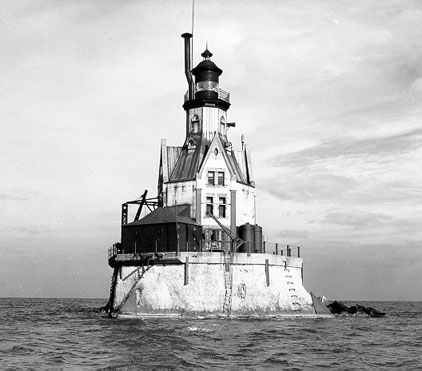
- Racine Reef Light (USCG)
- Location: Lake Michigan east of Racine
- Coordinates: 42°43′39.18″N 87°44′10.02″W

Tower
- Constructed: 1906
- Foundation: Brick/concrete pier
- Construction: Brick and concrete
- Automated: 1954
- Shape: octagonal house with central tower

Light
- First lit: 2008
- Deactivated: 1961
- Focal height: 72 ft (22 m)
- Lens: fourth order Fresnel lens
- Range: 11 nmi (20 km; 13 mi)
- Characteristic: Fl W 6s

The Racine Reef Light was a lighthouse located in Lake Michigan some two miles east of Racine, Wisconsin, marking the edge of its eponymous shallows. It was torn down in 1961 and replaced with a skeleton tower on the same foundation.

== History ==
The Racine Reef is a major hazard to navigation not only for shipping in and out of Racine harbor, but also for traffic between Milwaukee and Chicago. It has been marked with a succession of aids, starting with a can buoy placed in 1869 after a study of erecting a lighthouse on the reef itself found the expense to be too great. Various shore lights were also added including ranges based on the Racine breakwaters and a red beacon mounted on the Wind Point Light. These measures were found to be ineffective, and in 1898 construction began on a beacon set in the center of the reef. This acetylene-powered lamp was placed on a masonry platform resting on a wood crib; the light was first lit on August 31, 1899. This arrangement proved quickly to be quite problematic; the light was difficult to service and ever-increasing piles of rip-rap were laid about the platform in attempts to curb erosion and storm damage. In 1901 the beacon's iron tower was also made taller, but the problems continued.

In 1901 the lighthouse board decided that a staffed light was required, and in 1903 obtained a $75,000 appropriation. Construction was protracted: the crib and concrete pier foundation were not completed until 1905. Atop this was erected a three-story octagonal brick house with a tower in the center to hold a fourth order Fresnel lens. The original steam whistle fog signal was replaced with diaphone foghorns in the mid-1920s. The new tower was placed at the eastern edge of the reef, and upon its activation the old beacon was abandoned.

The light was automated in 1954, but in 1961 the house was demolished due to the difficulties of maintenance. By that point large amounts of rip-rap had been dumped around the pier in order to reduce vibration from waves and to limit winter icing of the structure. A steel tower replaced the house and remains in service. The Fresnel lens was preserved and is displayed at the Racine Heritage Museum.

The iron package freighter Merchant ran aground on Racine Reef in 1875.

== See also ==
- Racine Harbor Lighthouse and Life Saving Station
- Wind Point Light
- Racine North Breakwater Light
