= Racine Harbor Lighthouse and Life Saving Station =

- U.S. National Register of Historic Places
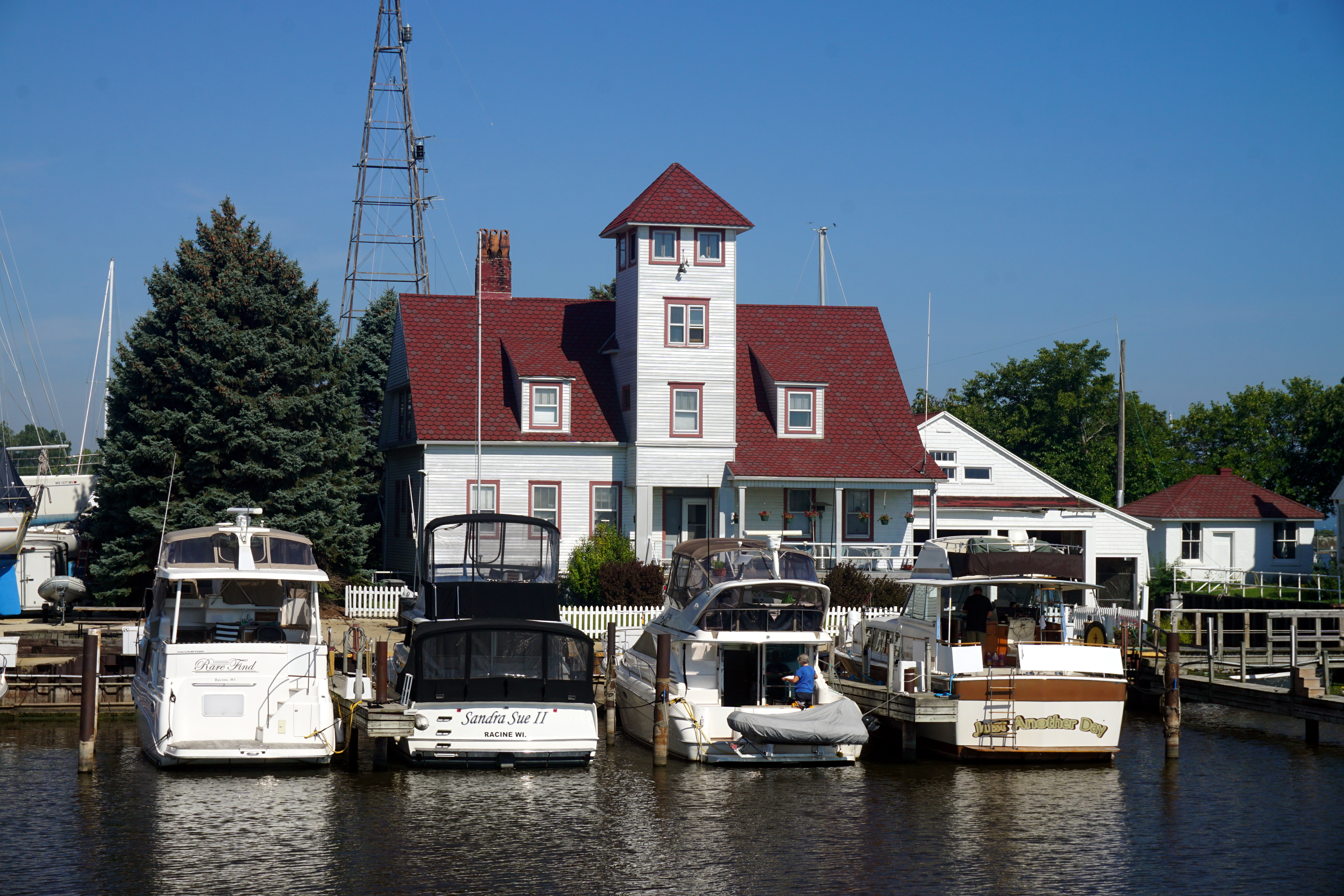
- Racine Harbor Lighthouse and Life Saving Station
- Location: Racine, Wisconsin
- Coordinates: 42.73405°N 87.7787°W
- NRHP reference No.: 75000077
- Added to NRHP: September 9, 1975

The Racine Harbor Lighthouse and Life Saving Station is a complex of navigation aids begun by the U.S. government in the 1860s near the harbor of Racine, Wisconsin. It was added to the National Register of Historic Places in 1975.

To guide ships into Racine's harbor, the federal government in 1837 built the first lighthouse at the mouth of the Root River, with a light on a 34 feet (10 m) tower and a lightkeeper's house. Those structures no longer exist.

In the early 1860s the pier was extended, and a new lighthouse and keeper's quarters were begun on a rock-filled crib 200 feet (61 m) offshore. They were completed in 1866 and served for 40 years. In 1903 the light was moved from the old lighthouse to a free-standing 120-foot steel tower, and the tower of the old lighthouse was capped with a hip roof.

The life-saving station was added in 1903, a 2-story building with a 3-story square, pyramidal-roofed lookout tower. Part of the station was a frame boathouse. A team from the Life-Saving Service lived in this station, and conducted search and rescue operations along the Milwaukee-Kenosha coast and 40 miles (64 km) out into Lake Michigan.

== See also ==
- Racine Reef Light
- Wind Point Light
- Racine North Breakwater Light
