= John Michels (politician) =

South African politician

John Michels MPP

Member of the Western Cape Provincial Parliament
- Incumbent
- Assumed office 17 October 2025
- Preceded by: Duwayne Jacobs

Personal details
- Party: National Coloured Congress (2024–present)
- Other political affiliations: GOOD (Until 2024; expelled)
- Profession: Politician

John Robert Michels is a South African politician who has been a Member of the Western Cape Provincial Parliament since October 2025, representing the National Coloured Congress. Michels had previously served as the deputy mayor and speaker of the Theewaterskloof Local Municipality in the Overberg District Municipality as a member of the Good party.

== Political career ==
As a member of the Good party, Michels was elected to the council of the Theewaterskloof Local Municipality in the 2021 local government elections. He was elected deputy mayor of the municipality at the inaugural council meeting afterwards as part of a coalition signed between the African National Congress, Patriotic Alliance and Good.

In January 2023, Michels faced a formal complaint of sexual harassment by a female municipal staff member. A subsequent report by Kruger and Blignaut Attorneys found prima facie evidence that Michels had transgessed the code of conduct for municipal councillors, as stipulated by the Municipal Structures Act. Michels denied the allegation.

In August 2024, Michels was elected council speaker as part of a coalition agreement signed between Good and the Democratic Alliance. Two weeks later, Michels and the other Good councillors in the municipality reneged the coalition agreement and voted to remove the DA mayor Lincoln de Bruyn and replace him with Tienie Zimmerman from the Freedom Front Plus. Michels and the other Good councillors were subsequently expelled from the party and ceased to be municipal councillors.

Michels unsuccessfully challenged the party's decision in the Western Cape High Court and subsequently joined the National Coloured Congress. On joining the NCC, Michels said in a post on Facebook: "I am and have always been a brown nationalist and now I am with a party where I don't have to hide my beliefs." He was appointed the party's leader in the Overberg District Municipality.

Michels was sworn in as a Member of the Western Cape Provincial Parliament for the NCC in October 2025.
