= SS John Mitchell (1906) =

American lake freighter ship

Coordinates: 46°50′3″N 85°4′48.6″W

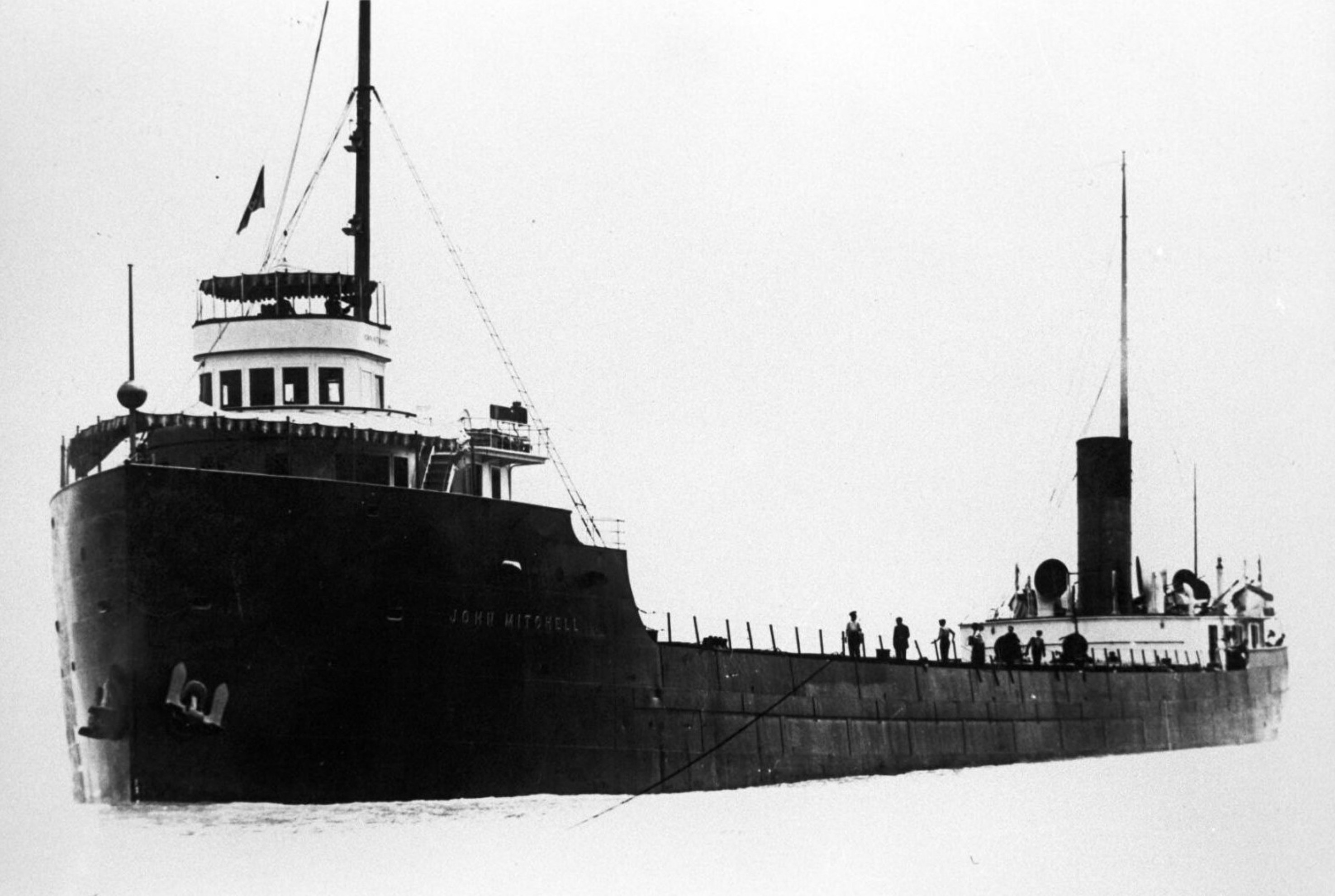
- John Mitchell in the St. Clair River by Louis James Pesha

History

United States
- Name: John Mitchell
- Namesake: Captain John Mitchell of Cleveland, Ohio
- Owner: C.W. Elphicke (Elphicke & Company) of Chicago, Illinois
- Operator: Cornell Steamship Company of Chicago
- Port of registry: Fairport, Ohio
- Builder: Great Lakes Engineering Works of St. Clair, Michigan
- Yard number: 25
- Launched: November 28, 1906
- In service: 1907
- Out of service: July 10, 1911
- Identification: US official number 203943
- Fate: Sank on Lake Superior after a collision with William Henry Mack

General characteristics
- Type: Lake freighter
- Tonnage: 4,468 GRT; 3,246 NRT
- Length: 440 feet (134 m) LOA; 420 feet (128 m) LBP
- Beam: 52 feet (15.8 m)
- Depth: 23 feet (7.0 m)
- Installed power: Engine: 1 × 1,442 hp (1,075 kW) triple expansion steam engine; Boilers: 2 × 180 pounds per square inch (1,200 kPa) Scotch marine boilers
- Propulsion: 1 × fixed pitch propeller
- Capacity: 7,500 long tons (7,620 t)
- Notes: Sister ship of William B. Davock

SS John Mitchell was a steel-hulled, American lake freighter in service between 1907 and 1911. She was built in 1906 by the Great Lakes Engineering Works in St. Clair, Michigan, for the Cornell Steamship Company of Chicago, Illinois, which was managed by C.W. Elphicke. She entered service in 1907, and had a sister ship named William B. Davock. Throughout her career, John Mitchell carried iron ore and coal. On October 4, 1908, she ran aground at Indiana Harbor, Indiana, while loaded with iron ore.

Early in the morning of July 7, 1911, John Mitchell left Buffalo, New York, with between 6,889 long tons (7,716 short tons; 7,000 t) and 7,382 long tons (8,268 short tons; 7,500 t) of coal bound for Superior, Wisconsin. On the morning of July 10, John Mitchell entered Lake Superior. A thick fog that hung over the lake severely reduced visibility. When she was off Vermilion Point, John Mitchell was inexplicably rammed in her port bow by the unladen bulk freighter William Henry Mack. Following the collision, John Mitchell immediately took on a list to port due to the rapid influx of water. After establishing that John Mitchell would not remain afloat, a ladder was placed between her deck and William Henry Mack's deck. The majority of the passengers and crew climbed over to William Henry Mack, while six people escaped using a lifeboat, which eventually capsized; all of the people in the lifeboat were rescued. Three crewmen jumped overboard to aid in the rescue, but were sucked under and drowned when John Mitchell sank.

The wreck of John Mitchell was discovered in 1972, resting upside down in between 140 feet (43 m) and 150 feet (46 m) of water, roughly 3 miles (5 km) west-northwest off Whitefish Point, in an area known as the Graveyard of the Great Lakes. The wreck is protected by the Whitefish Point Underwater Preserve as part of an underwater museum.

== History ==
=== Background ===
In 1843, the gunship USS Michigan became the first iron-hulled vessel built on the Great Lakes upon her launching in Erie, Pennsylvania. Though Canadian merchants were importing iron vessels prefabricated in the United Kingdom by the mid-1840s, the first regionally produced iron-hulled merchant vessel, Merchant, would not be built until 1862. Despite Merchant's clear success proving the potential of iron hulls, ships built from wood remained preferable until the 1880s due to their lower cost, as well as the abundance of high-quality timber and workers trained in carpentry. Between the early 1870s and the mid-1880s, shipyards around the Great Lakes began to construct iron ships on a relatively large scale.

In 1884, the first steel freighters were built on the Great Lakes, with metal becoming a material used in the construction of new hulls by the 1890s. Rapidly decreasing steel prices, combined with the development of the pneumatic rivet gun and the advancement of gantry cranes enabling shipyard employees to work at an increased speed and with greater efficiency, contributed to the rapid increase in the size of lake freighters in the late 19th and early 20th centuries.

Throughout the 1880s, the iron ore trade on the Great Lakes grew quickly, primarily due to the increasing size of the lake freighters and the rise in the number of trips they made to the ore docks of Lake Superior. With the railways unable to keep up with the rapid extraction of iron ore, bulk freighters became an integral component in the region's iron ore industry. By 1890, 57% of the 16,000,000 long tons (16,256,751 t) of the iron ore produced by mines in the United States was sourced from the region surrounding Lake Superior.

=== Design and construction ===
John Mitchell (US official number 203943) was built on the banks of the St. Clair River in 1906, by the St. Clair, Michigan, shipyard of the Great Lakes Engineering Works. (Note: The St. Clair, Michigan yard of the Great Lakes Engineering Works was active between 1903 and 1911.) She had a sister ship named William B. Davock, which succeeded her out of the shipyard. The only differences between John Mitchell and William B. Davock were their steering poles (John Mitchell's was upright, fixed, and was adorned with a colourful orb, while William B. Davock's was a straight, hinged pole), and the size of their boilers (William B. Davock's boilers were 4 inches (10.2 cm) larger).

The hull of John Mitchell had an overall length of 440 feet (134 m), and a length between perpendiculars of 420 feet (128 m). Her beam was 52 feet (15.8 m) wide, while her hull was 23 feet (7.0 m) (some sources state 28 feet (8.5 m)) deep. John Mitchell had a gross tonnage of 4,468 tons, a net tonnage of 3,246 tons, and a cargo capacity of 7,500 long tons (7,620 t).

She was powered by a 1,442 hp (1,075 kW) triple expansion steam engine, which had the builder's number 344; the cylinders of the engine were 21 inches (53.3 cm), 34.5 inches (87.6 cm) and 57 inches (144.8 cm) in diameter, and had a stroke of 42 inches (106.7 cm). (Note: Some sources list the power of her engine as 1,350 hp (1,010 kW) or 1,400 hp (1,000 kW).) Steam for the engine was provided by two coal-fired, single-ended 180 pounds per square inch (1,200 kPa) 13 feet (4.0 m) by 11.6 feet (3.5 m) Scotch marine boilers. The engine was built by the Great Lakes Engineering Works, while the boilers were manufactured by the Marine Boiler Works of Toledo, Ohio.

John Mitchell was named after Captain John Mitchell, a Canadian-American vessel owner and operator, and Cleveland, Ohio, resident who may also have had an interest in her. She was launched into the St. Clair River on November 28, 1906, as yard number 26. After she was launched, the shipyard worked through the remainder of 1906, and early 1907 to complete her, after which, they started building William B. Davock.

=== Service history ===
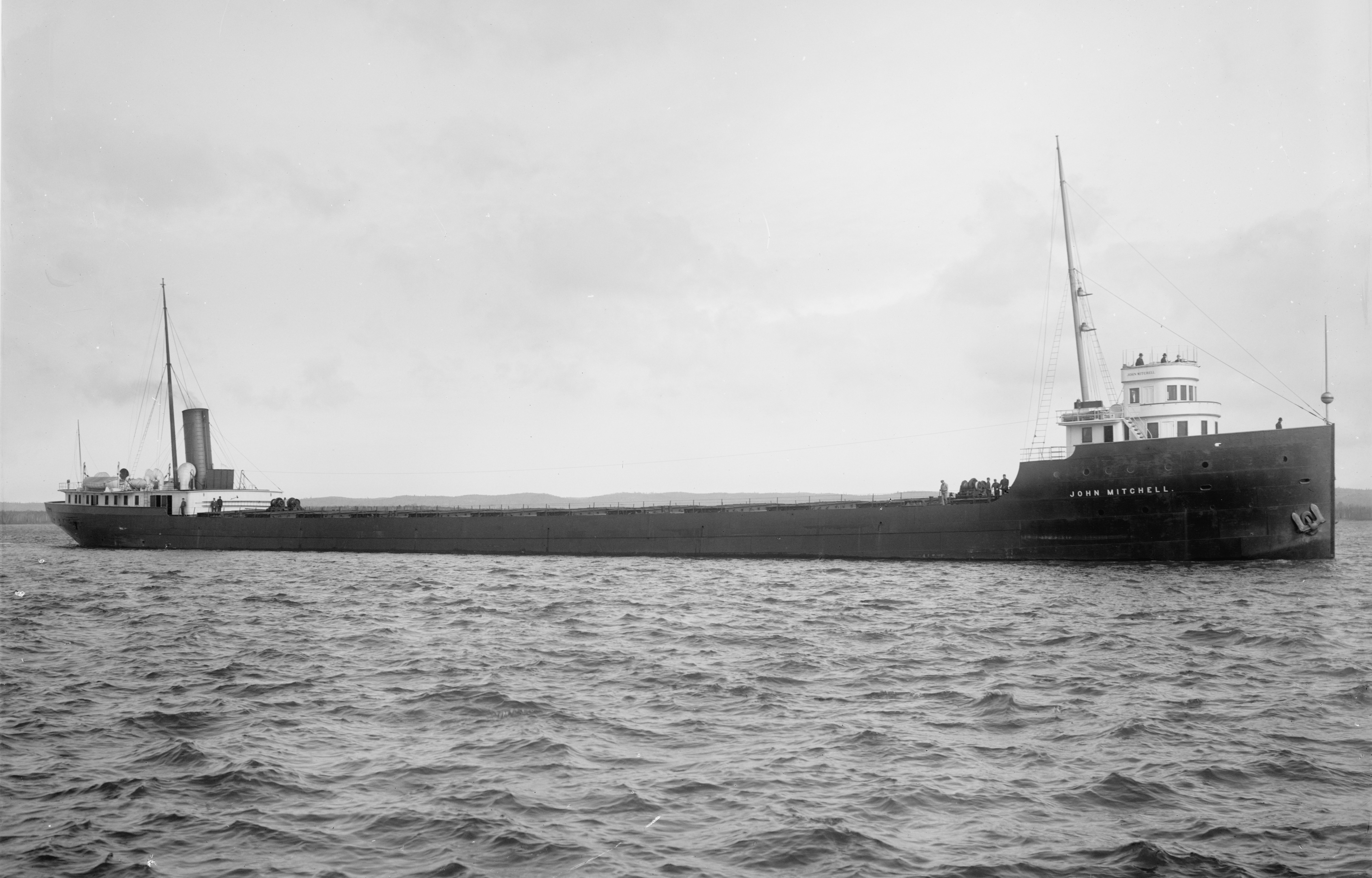
John Mitchell underway

John Mitchell was built for the Cornell Steamship Company of Chicago, Illinois, which was managed by C.W. Elphicke (Elphicke & Company), also of Chicago. She was first enrolled at Port Huron, Michigan, on April 2, 1907. She was re-enrolled in Detroit, Michigan, on April 7, and was permanently enrolled in Cleveland on May 13. Her home port was Fairport, Ohio. John Mitchell entered service later in 1907. She carried coal on upbound voyages, and iron ore on downbound ones.

The only known incident in John Mitchell's career prior to her loss occurred on October 14, 1908, when while loaded with iron ore from a Lake Superior port, she ran aground at the harbour entrance at Indiana Harbor, Indiana. The grounding occurred as a result of water levels 2 feet (0.6 m) lower than usual, which resulted from strong winds that had been blowing for the previous 24 hours. John Mitchell sustained no damage, and was freed by the tugs G.W. Gnau and Tomlinson.

=== Final voyage ===
After loading 7,000 long tons (7,112 t) to 7,500 long tons (7,620 t) of coal bound for Superior, Wisconsin, at the Erie coal dock, John Mitchell left Buffalo, New York, at 2:00 a.m. on July 7, 1911, under the command of Captain John H. Massey. In addition to Captain Massey, there were 33 passengers and crew, including six women and a small boy on board.

Early on the morning of July 10, John Mitchell entered Lake Superior. As she was passing Ile Parisienne, she encountered fog, which heavily thickened by the time she passed Whitefish Point severely reducing visibility. When she was off Vermilion Point, about 10 miles (16 km) west of Whitefish Point, John Mitchell was inexplicably rammed in her port bow by the unladen bulk freighter William Henry Mack. There was no time to avoid the collision, with Captain Massey only managing to sound John Mitchell's whistle once before William Henry Mack's bow cut deeply into his vessel's hull. Following the collision, John Mitchell immediately took on a list to port due to the rapid influx of water. John Mitchell's foremast fell onto William Henry Mack's deck, briefly keeping the two vessels together. After establishing that John Mitchell would not remain afloat, a ladder was placed between her stern deck and William Henry Mack's deck.

The majority of the passengers and crew climbed over to William Henry Mack, while three men and three women escaped using a lifeboat. Seven minutes after the collision, John Mitchell capsized and sank. The suction created by her sinking capsized the lifeboat. Sixteen year-old passenger Fay Clemens, one of the six people in the overturned lifeboat was able to get William Henry Mack's crew to throw her a line, which she fastened to the overturned lifeboat, enabling two crew of William Henry Mack to right it. As she was sinking, three crewmen, second officer Archie Causley, watchman George Austin and steward Albert "Al" Clemens, father of Fay Clemens jumped overboard to aid in the rescue, and were sucked under and drowned when John Mitchell sank. William Henry Mack remained afloat, and headed for Sault Ste. Marie, Michigan.

At $240,000 (equivalent to $5.86 million in 2024 (Note: Johnston, Louis & Williamson, Samuel H. (2023). "What Was the U.S. GDP Then?". MeasuringWorth. United States Gross Domestic Product deflator figures follow the MeasuringWorth series.)), John Mitchell was the worst insurance loss on the Great Lakes in 1911.

==== Investigation ====
An investigation conducted in Marquette, Michigan, by United States inspectors Charles M. Gooding and Charles M. York found Captain George H. Burnham of William Henry Mack largely responsible for the collision. It was found that at the time John Mitchell encountered fog off Ile Parisienne, her fog whistle was sounded, and her speed was reduced to 7 miles per hour (6.1 kn). It was discovered that as William Henry Mack was travelling 16 miles (26 km) east-southeast of Manitou Island, she encountered a thick fog bank, sounded her fog whistle, but did not reduce her approximate speed of 12 miles per hour (10.4 kn). Evidence given by Captain Massey and Captain Burnham regarding the fog signals conflicted. Captain Burnham claimed that he sounded the correct passing signals, while also claiming he heard no signals from John Mitchell. However, Captain Massey claimed that he exchanged the appropriate passing signals. Evidence given by the captains was supported by their respective crews. Captain Massey's licence was suspended for 30 days, while Captain Burnham's licence was suspended for 12 months.

== John Mitchell today ==
The wreck of John Mitchell was discovered in 1972, resting upside down in between 140 feet (43 m) and 150 feet (46 m) (some sources state 120 feet (37 m) and 150 feet (46 m)) of water, roughly 3 miles (5 km) west-northwest off Whitefish Point. Although resting upside-down, John Mitchell's wreck is penetrable. The cargo holds, intact engine room, steering quadrant room, and some cabins are accessible. The engine room and steering quadrant room are accessible through a gangway located on the John Mitchell's starboard side, near her stern. Mostly overlooked by divers, the wreck is protected by the 376-square-mile (970 km^{2}) Whitefish Point Underwater Preserve as part of an underwater museum. The wreck of the steel freighter John B. Cowle is located east of John Mitchell. There is usually a mooring line on her rudder.

== Sources ==
- Alpena County George N. Fletcher Public Library (2021). "John Mitchell (1907, Bulk Freighter)". Alpena, Michigan: Alpena County George N. Fletcher Public Library.
- Berry, Sterling (2021). "Mitchell, John". Detroit, Michigan: Great Lakes Vessel Histories.
- Bowlus, W. Bruce (2010). Iron Ore Transport on the Great Lakes: The Development of a Delivery System to Feed American Industry. Jefferson, North Carolina: McFarland & Company, Inc. ISBN 978-0-786433-26-1. Archived from the original on August 14, 2021.
- British Whig (1911). "British Whig (Kingston, ON), 11 Jul 1911". Kingston, Ontario: British Whig.
- British Whig (1912). "British Whig (Kingston, ON), 8 Jan 1912". Kingston, Ontario: British Whig.
- Bugbee, Gordon P. (February 1962a). "Iron Merchant Ships: An Upper Lakes Centennial – Part One" (PDF). Detroit, Michigan: Great Lakes Maritime Institute. Archived (PDF) from the original on July 13, 2021.
- Bugbee, Gordon P. (March 1962b). "Iron Merchant Ships: An Upper Lakes Centennial – Part Two" (PDF). Detroit, Michigan: Great Lakes Maritime Institute. Archived (PDF) from the original on May 20, 2021.
- "Choctaw Shipwreck Site National Register of Historic Places Registration Form" (PDF). Washington D.C.: National Park Service. 2018. Archived from the original (PDF) on 1 January 2019.
- Exploring the North (2021). "Whitefish Point Underwater Diving Preserve – 12 miles north of Paradise, Michigan". Iron Mountain, Michigan: Exploring the North.
- Hanakova, Jitka (2021). "Freighter John Mitchell". Milwaukee, Wisconsin: Shipwreck Explorers.
- Harrington, Steve (1998). Divers Guide to Michigan. St. Ignace, Michigan: Maritime Press & Great Lakes Diving Council, Inc. ISBN 0-9624629-8-5.
- Hillstrom, Kevin; Hillstrom, Laurie Collier (1998). Adventure Guide to Michigan. Edison, New Jersey: Hunter Publishing, Inc. ISBN 1-5565082-0-4.
- Maritime History of the Great Lakes (1908). "John Mitchell (Propeller), U203943, aground, 14 Oct 1908". Ontario, Canada: Maritime History of the Great Lakes.
- Maritime History of the Great Lakes (1911). "John Mitchell (Propeller), U203943, sunk by collision, 10 Jul 1911". Ontario, Canada: Maritime History of the Great Lakes.
- Merryman, Ken (2021). "John Mitchell". Fridley, Minnesota: Superior Trips.
- Nordic Diver (2021). "Steamer John Mitchell". Milwaukee, Wisconsin: Nordic Diver.
- Sportsman's Connection (2016). Northern Michigan All-Outdoors Atlas & Field Guide. Superior, Wisconsin: Sportsman's Connection. ISBN 9781885010735.
- Stonehouse, Frederick (1990) [1984]. Went Missing, II. Au Train, Michigan: Avery Color Studios. ISBN 978-0-932212-37-5.
- Swayze, David (2001). "Great Lakes Shipwrecks – M". Port Huron, Michigan: Boatnerd. Archived from the original on June 15, 2002.
- The Marine Review (1911a). "The Marine Review – Vol.41, Cleveland, July, 1911, New York, No.7". Cleveland, Ohio: The Marine Review.
- The Marine Review (1911b). "The Marine Review – Vol.41, Cleveland, August, 1911, New York, No.8". Cleveland, Ohio: The Marine Review.
- The Marine Review (1911c). "The Marine Review – Vol.41, Cleveland, October, 1911, New York, No.10". Cleveland, Ohio: The Marine Review.
- The Marine Review (1914). "The Marine Review – Vol.44, Cleveland, October, 1911, New York, No.2". Cleveland, Ohio: The Marine Review.
- Thompson, Mark L. (1994). Queen of the Lakes. Detroit, Michigan: Wayne State University Press. ISBN 0-8143-2393-6. Archived from the original on August 14, 2021.
- Toronto Marine Historical Society (1990). "The Scanner – Ship of the Month No.181: A Tale of Two Lost Sisters [John Mitchell, William B. Davock]". Toronto, Ontario: Toronto Marine Historical Society.
