= John Mitchell (cricketer) =

New Zealand cricketer

Personal information
- Full name: William John Mitchell
- Born: 1 December 1947 (age 78); Auckland, New Zealand
- Batting: Right-handed
- Bowling: Right-arm medium
- Role: Batsman

Domestic team information
- Years: Team
- 1964/65–1966/67: Northern Districts
- 1968/69: Otago
- FC debut: 4 February 1965 Northern Districts v Pakistanis
- Last FC: 30 December 1968 Otago v Wellington

Career statistics
Competition	First-class
Matches	14
Runs scored	634
Batting average	27.56
100s/50s	1/4
Top score	127*
Balls bowled	30
Wickets	1
Bowling average	15.00
5 wickets in innings	0
10 wickets in match	0
Best bowling	1/15
Catches/stumpings	8/–
- Source: CricInfo, 16 September 2008

William John Mitchell (born 1 December 1947) is a former New Zealand cricketer, who played first-class cricket for Northern Districts and Otago. A right-handed batsman and occasional right-arm medium pace bowler, Mitchell played 14 first-class matches between 1964 and 1969, scoring 634 runs at 27.56 and taking one wicket.

== Career ==
Born in Auckland, Mitchell began his first-class career in 1964 for Northern Districts. He began successfully, playing three matches over the summer of 1964/65 and scoring 212 runs at 53.00, including one half century and the only century of his career, 127 not out on debut against the touring Pakistan team. He also took his only first class wicket in this debut match, that of Abdul Kadir.

Mitchell had a far less successful season over the summer of 1965/66. where he again played three matches for Northern Districts; however his return was only 71 runs at 14.20, with a high score of 38. The following season, his last for Northern Districts, returned 252 runs from six matches at 22.90, with two fifties and a high score of 74. For the next season, Mitchell moved to Otago. He played two matches in the 1968/69 season, scoring 99 runs at 33.00, the second highest season average of his career, with a single half century of 52 his highest score.

Mitchell also played two first-class matches for the New Zealand Under-23s. In the 1966–67 match against Central Districts he scored 74 out of the Under-23s' first innings of 140.

Later, Mitchell played his club cricket for Burnside West Christchurch University Cricket Club in Canterbury, first joining when he was attending teachers' college. He was the first president of The Willows Cricket Club in Loburn, Canterbury, serving from 1994 to 2003. At the end of his teaching career Mitchell was divisional principal at Burnside High School.
