= Jack Mitchell (Australian footballer, born 1911) =

Australian rules footballer, born 1911

Personal information
- Full name: Eric John Mitchell
- Born: 15 May 1911; Collingwood, Victoria
- Died: 17 May 1963 (aged 52); Dandenong, Victoria
- Original team: Mentone
- Height: 178 cm (5 ft 10 in)
- Weight: 72 kg (159 lb)

Playing career^{1}
Years	Club	Games (Goals)
1936	Hawthorn	7 (0)
- ^{1} Playing statistics correct to the end of 1936.

Eric John Mitchell (15 May 1911 – 17 May 1963) was an Australian rules footballer who played with Hawthorn in the Victorian Football League (VFL).
