= SS Merchant =

American passenger and package freighter ship

Coordinates: 42°43′47.82″N 87°45′51.18″W

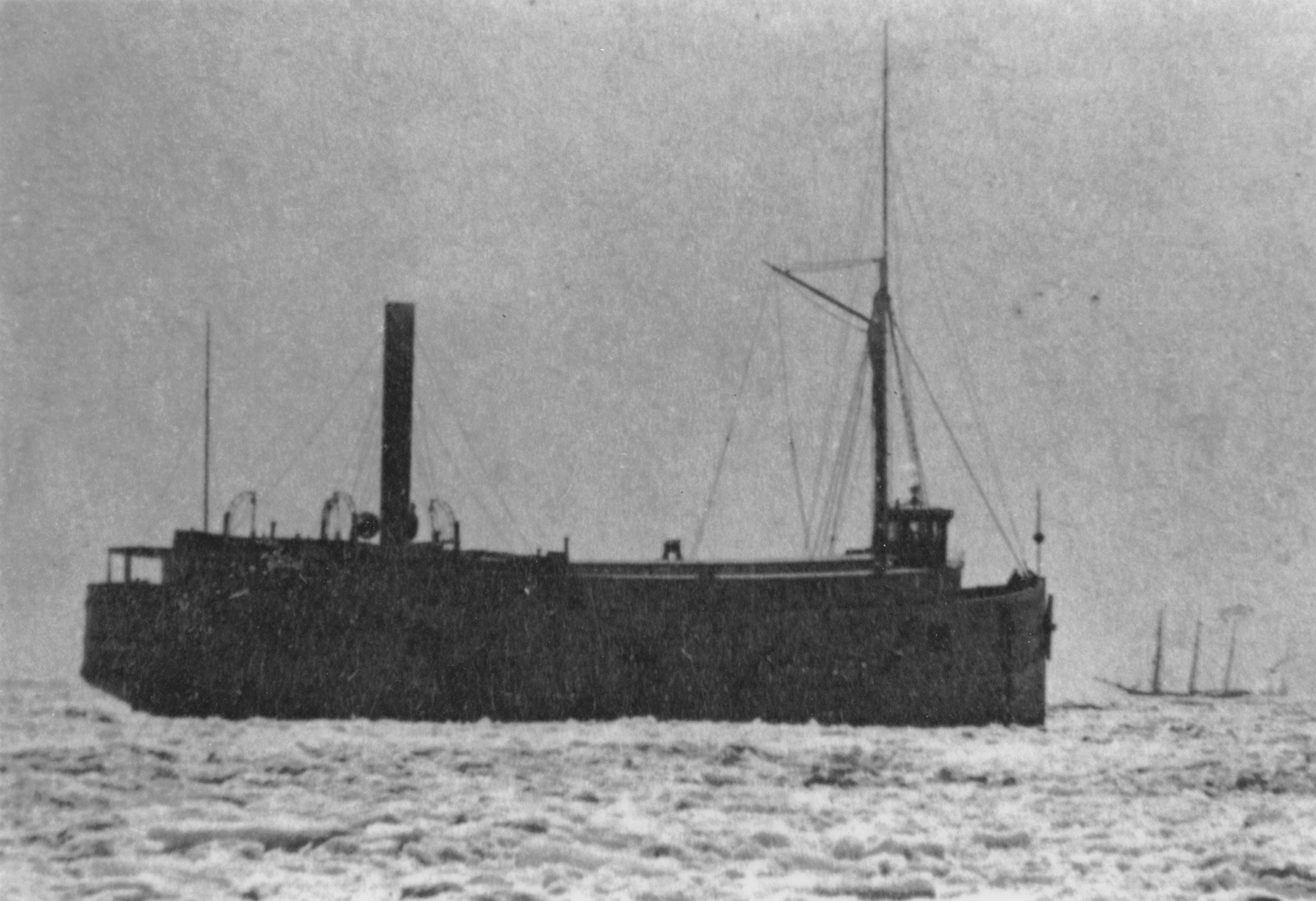
- Merchant, depicted in a stereoscopic photograph

History

United States
- Name: Merchant
- Owner: James C. & Edwin T. Evans (1862–1873); Erie & Western Transportation Company (also known as the "Anchor Line") (1873–1875)
- Operator: Erie & Western Transportation Company
- Port of registry: Buffalo, New York (1862–1873); Erie, Pennsylvania (1873–1875)
- Builder: David Bell shipyard of Buffalo, New York; Construction supervised by J. V. F. Wilson
- Launched: July 12, 1862
- In service: August 2, 1862
- Out of service: October 6, 1875
- Identification: US official number 16332
- Fate: Wrecked on Lake Michigan
- Notes: First iron hulled vessel constructed on the Great Lakes, also first to use coal as fuel

General characteristics
- Type: Passenger and package freighter
- Tonnage: 720.66 GRT
- Length: 200 feet (61.0 m) LOA; 189.25 feet (57.7 m) or 192 feet (58.5 m) LBP
- Beam: 29.16 feet (8.9 m)
- Draft: 12 feet (3.7 m) (average)
- Depth: 13.66 feet (4.2 m)
- Installed power: Engine: 1 × 600 hp (450 kW) low pressure direct action condensing engine; Boiler: 1 × 50 pounds per square inch (340 kPa) low pressure firebox boiler
- Propulsion: 1 × fixed pitch propeller (10 feet (3.0 m) diameter, 14 feet (4.3 m) pitch)
- Speed: 14 miles per hour (12 kn)
- Capacity: c. 837 long tons (937 short tons; 850 t)

SS Merchant was an American iron–hulled passenger and package freighter in service between 1862 and 1875. The first iron–hulled merchant ship built on the Great Lakes, she was built in 1862 in Buffalo, New York, by the David Bell shipyard, out of components manufactured in Black Rock, New York, and Philadelphia, Pennsylvania. She was built for James C. and Edwin T. Evans of Buffalo, under whom she carried passengers and freight. Merchant made her maiden voyage in August 1862, sailing from Buffalo to Chicago. Between late 1872 and early 1873, she was lengthened by 30 feet (9.1 m), and had her passenger cabins removed. Also in 1873, Merchant was sold to the Erie & Western Transportation Company (also known as the "Anchor Line") of Erie, Pennsylvania.

On October 6, 1875, while bound from Chicago for Milwaukee, Wisconsin, with a cargo of 20,000 bushels of corn, 200 barrels of flour and 2,000 bags of flax, she ran aground on Racine Reef off Racine, Wisconsin, due to a navigational error. Her hull punctured, she settled onto the reef. Although it was initially believed that she could be saved, she was abandoned by October 13 and had broken apart by November 1. By 1877, all of her machinery had been recovered.

Rediscovered sometime during the 1990s, her wreck lies fragmented and scattered over a large area in about 25 feet (7.6 m) of water.

== History ==
=== Background ===
Although Merchant was the first iron-hulled merchant ship built entirely within the Great Lakes, the gunship USS Michigan, built in 1843, in Erie, Pennsylvania, was the first iron-hulled vessel built on the lakes. Beginning in the mid-1840s, Canadian companies began importing iron vessels, prefabricated by shipyards in the United Kingdom. However, it would not be until Merchant that the first iron–hulled commercial vessel was built on the Great Lakes. Despite the success of Merchant, wooden vessels remained preferable to iron ones until the 1880s, due to their lower cost and the abundance of timber. In the early 1880s, shipyards around the lakes began construction of iron ships on a relatively large scale; in 1882, Onoko, an iron freighter, temporarily became the largest ship on the lakes. In 1884, the first steel freighters were built on the Great Lakes, and by the 1890s, the majority of ships constructed on the lakes were made of steel.

David Bell, a Scottish immigrant, founded the Bell & McNish engine works in 1845 in Buffalo, New York; the company eventually evolved into the Bell's Steam Engine Works. Bell started constructing ships under his own name in 1858; Merchant was the third ship built by his shipyard.

=== Design and construction ===
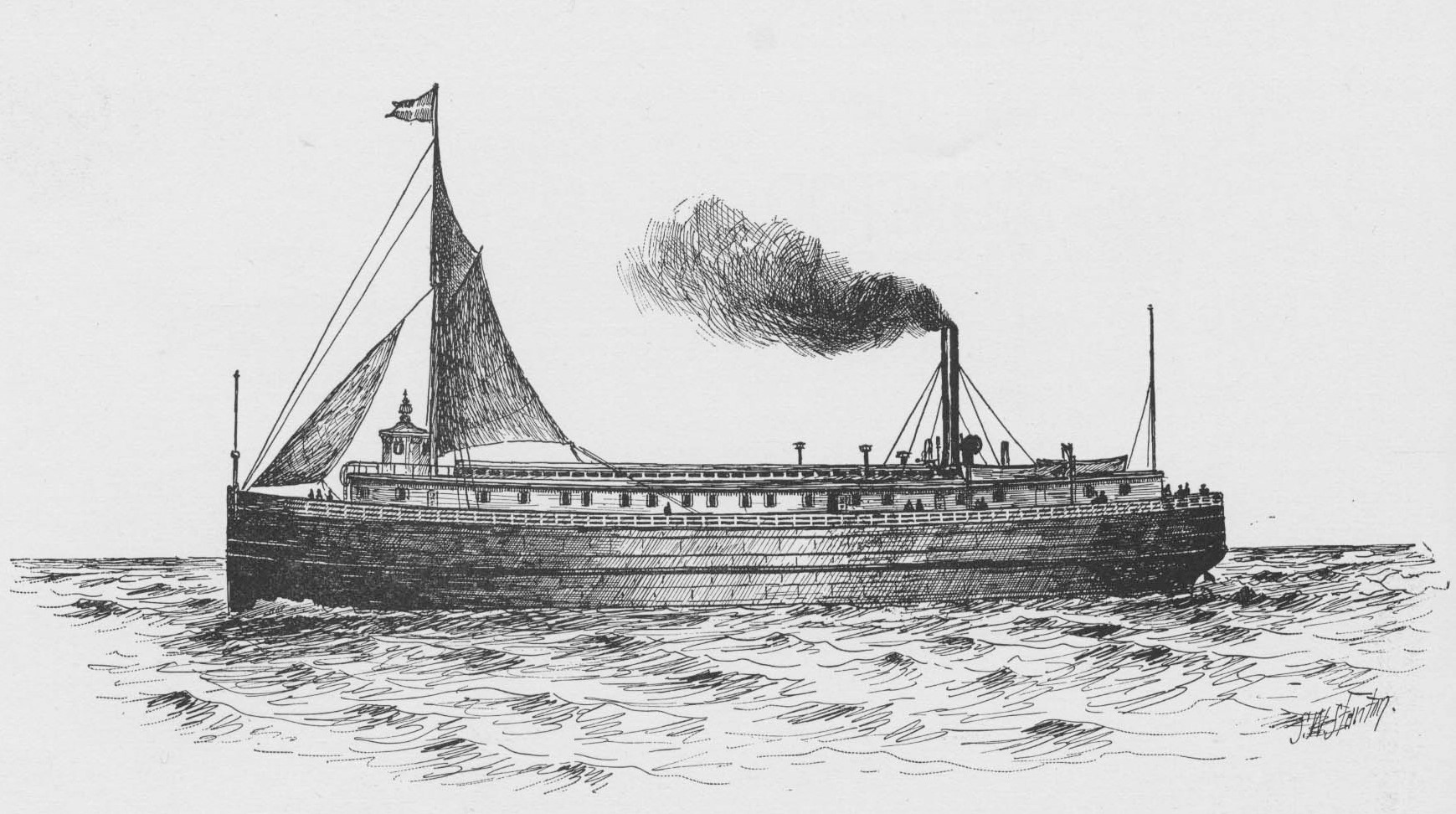
Drawing of Merchant by Samuel Ward Stanton

Merchant (US official number 16332) was built in 1862 in Buffalo, New York, by the shipyard owned by David Bell out of components manufactured in Black Rock, New York by Pratt & Company. Some components were also manufactured in Philadelphia, Pennsylvania. Merchant's construction was supervised by J. V. F. Wilson, while the carpentry and joiner work was done by Hitchcock & Gibson.

Her iron hull had an overall length of 200 feet (61.0 m), and a length between perpendiculars of 189.25 feet (57.7 m) (some sources also state 189.3 feet (57.7 m) or 192 feet (58.5 m)). Merchant's hull was 29.16 feet (8.9 m) (some sources also state 29 feet (8.8 m), 29.2 feet (8.9 m) or 29.4 feet (9.0 m)) wide, 13.66 feet (4.2 m) (some sources also state 12.9 feet (3.9 m), 13.8 feet (4.2 m) or 14 feet (4.3 m)) deep, and had an average draught of 12 feet (3.7 m). She had a gross tonnage of 720.66 tons (also given as 72061/95 in old style measurements).

Merchant was powered by a single cylinder 600 hp (450 kW) low pressure direct acting condensing engine, the cylinder of which was 40 inches (101.6 cm) in diameter, and had a stroke of 36 inches (91.4 cm). The engine was built by the David Bell Iron Works. Steam for the engine was provided by a 50 pounds per square inch (340 kPa) low pressure firebox boiler which was 19 feet (5.8 m) long, and 9 feet (2.7 m) in diameter. She was propelled by a four-bladed fixed pitch propeller; it was 10 feet (3.0 m) in diameter and had a 14 feet (4.3 m) pitch, while the propeller shaft was 31 feet (9.4 m) feet in length. Her top speed was 14 miles per hour (12.2 kn). She used coal as fuel, becoming the first ship on the Great Lakes to do so.

She had four water-tight bulkheads, a single mast with an auxiliary sail and a cargo capacity of approximately 837 long tons (937 short tons; 850 t). She cost between ($70,000 equivalent to $1.76 million in 2025), and $75,000 (equivalent to $1.88 million in 2025), although some sources state $90,000 (equivalent to $2.26 million in 2025) to build. Merchant was launched on July 12, 1862, at 5:30 a.m., in order to avoid a large crowd attending the ceremony.

=== Service history ===
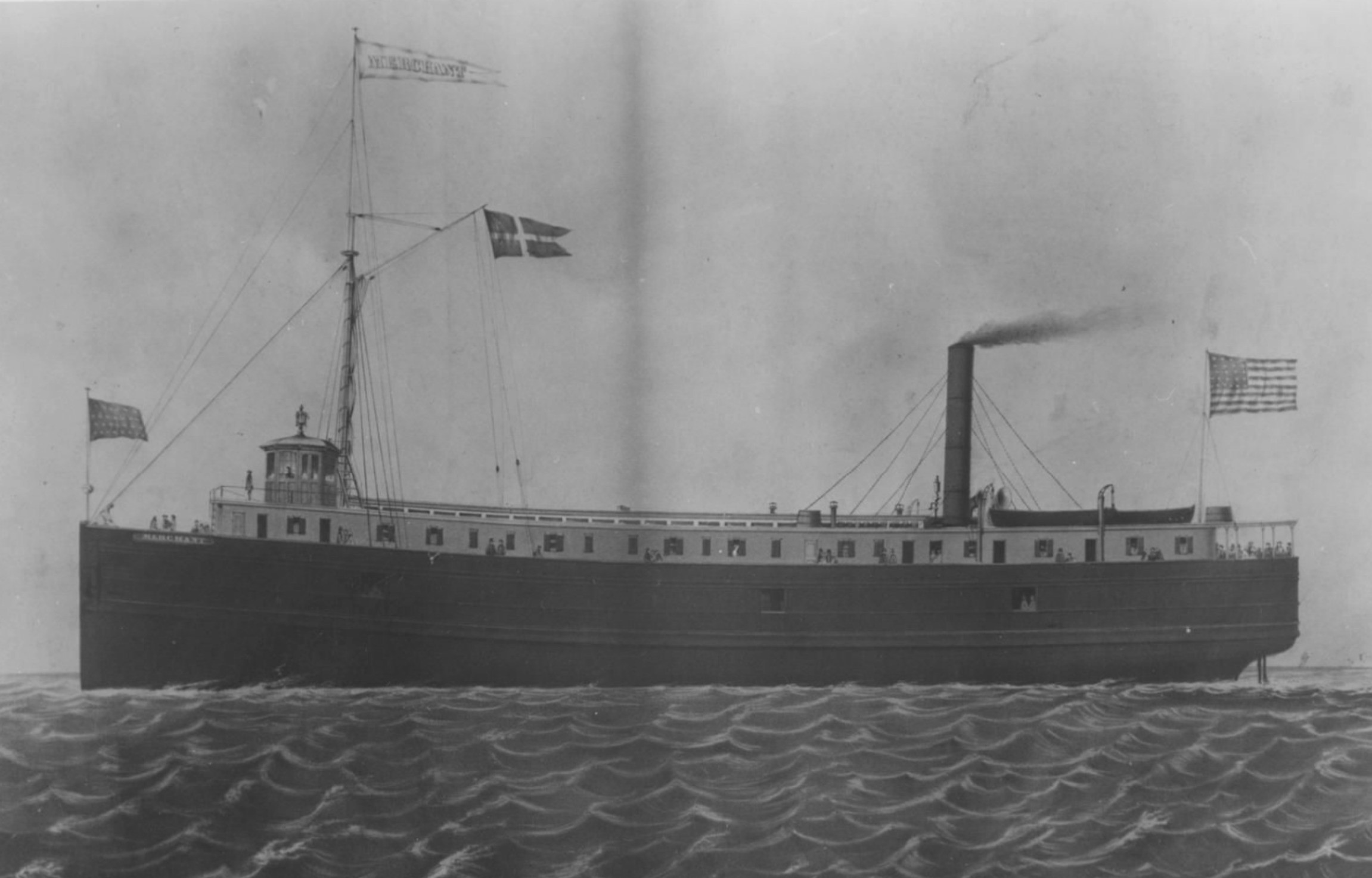
Lithograph of Merchant

Merchant was enrolled in Buffalo, which was also her home port, on August 2, 1862. She was built for James C. and Edwin T. Evans (also of Buffalo), under whom she carried passengers and freight. On her maiden voyage in August 1862, Merchant travelled from Buffalo to Chicago, Illinois, under the command of Captain Albert Briggs. Throughout her career, Merchant was involved in multiple accidents and incidents.

The first accident Merchant was involved in occurred in November 1862, when she collided with and damaged the schooner Mazeppa in Buffalo. After the old measurement system was abolished, Merchant was remeasured in Buffalo on April 25, 1865; under the new system, Merchant was 194.5 feet (59.3 m) or 194.6 feet (59.3 m) long, 29 feet (8.8 m) or 29.1 feet (8.9 m) wide and 13 feet (4.0 m) deep, while her gross tonnage was 861.18 tons.

While travelling on Lake Michigan in May 1866, Merchant lost one of her crewmen overboard. In May 1867, Merchant became stuck in ice near Buffalo. On November 19 of that same year, Merchant ran aground 2 miles (3.2 km) north of White Lake. While bound for Buffalo with a cargo of flour and oats on October 11, 1868, Merchant struck a submerged shipwreck in the Detroit River; she was beached near Malden, Ontario, to prevent her from sinking. She was removed by the wrecking tug Margaret and was repaired in Detroit, Michigan. In October 1869, Merchant was damaged in a collision with an unknown vessel in Buffalo.

In May 1872, while loaded with general merchandise, Merchant struck an obstruction off Bar Point, near Amherstburg, Ontario, and sank. She was raised, and taken to Detroit for repairs. Between late 1872 and early 1873, Merchant was lengthened by 30 feet (9.1 m); her gross tonnage increased to 1068.65 (some sources state 1068.66) tons. Her passenger cabins were also removed. That same year, she was sold to the Erie & Western Transportation Company (also known as the "Anchor Line") of Erie, Pennsylvania, which became her home port. In September 1873, Merchant rammed the bark City of Painsville in Chicago, severely damaging the latter.

Throughout 1874, Merchant was involved in four accidents. In April, she collided with the bulk freighter Fred Kelly in the Straits of Mackinac. Two months later, she collided with an unknown vessel in Chicago, sustaining $100 (equivalent to $2,509 in 2025) worth of damage. In July, while loaded with 17,000/18,000 bushels of corn, 7,000 bushels oats, flour and sundries, Merchant ran aground on Racine Reef in fog; she sustained heavy damage, flooded, and sank into 12 feet (3.7 m) of water. Merchant's hull was pumped free of water and arrived in Milwaukee, Wisconsin at 3:00 p.m. on July 31. She was placed in dry dock at the Wolf & Davidson shipyard in Milwaukee, where it was discovered that she had sustained severe damage to her keel and bottom. Her hull sustained $9,500 (equivalent to $238,387 in 2025) worth of damage, while her cargo was a total loss, resulting in a loss of $25,000 (equivalent to $627,335 in 2025). Merchant ran aground on Peche Island in Lake St. Clair in November.

=== Final voyage and wreck ===
On October 6, 1875, while bound from Chicago for Milwaukee, with a cargo of 20,000 bushels of corn, 200 barrels of flour and 2,000 bags of flax, Merchant ran aground at full speed in the middle of Racine Reef off Racine, Wisconsin, at around 11:00 p.m. due to a navigational error. Her second mate, who was in charge at the time, miscalculated her position; he believed Merchant was approximately 10 miles (16.1 km) off Kenosha, Wisconsin, and did not notice his mistake until he saw the buoy marking Racine Reef. She punctured her hull and sank onto the reef in about fifteen minutes. There were no casualties.

Although Merchant was initially thought to be saveable, she was abandoned by October 13, and had begun to break apart by November 11. By November 3, she had been broken in two by a storm. Merchant was insured for $100,000 (equivalent to $2.51 million in 2025) at the time of her loss. Throughout the summer of 1877, Knapp & Gillen of Racine removed Merchant's machinery and a significant amount of scrap metal. In the following years, Merchant's wreck was dynamited multiple times.

The remains of Merchant lay forgotten until sometime in the 1990s, when some of her remains were located on Racine Reef. Her wreck lies in 25 feet (7.6 m) of water, broken up and scattered over a large area, with only minor structural components remaining. Maritime historian Brendon Baillod dubbed Merchant "one of the most significant, most historic vessels lost in Wisconsin waters".

== See also ==
- Independence (steamboat), first steamboat to run on Lake Superior
- Ontario (steamboat), first steamboat to see active service on Lake Ontario
- Walk-in-the-Water (steamboat), first steamboat to run on Lake Erie, played a pioneering role in steamboat navigation on the Great Lakes.

== Sources ==
- Alpena County George N. Fletcher Public Library (2021). "Merchant (1862, Propeller)". Alpena, Michigan: Alpena County George N. Fletcher Public Library.
- Baillod, Brendon (2009). "Fathoms Deep But Not Forgotten: Wisconsin's Historic Shipwrecks – Part II: Racine County". Brendon Baillod and Great Lakes Shipwreck Research.
- Berry, Sterling (2021). "Merchant". Detroit, Michigan: Great Lakes Vessel Histories of Sterling Berry.
- Bowling Green State University (2021). "Merchant". Bowling Green, Ohio: Bowling Green State University.
- Bowlus, W. Bruce (2010). Iron Ore Transport on the Great Lakes: The Development of a Delivery System to Feed American Industry. Jefferson, North Carolina: McFarland & Company, Inc. ISBN 9780786486557.
- Bugbee, Gordon P. (February 1962a). "Iron Merchant Ships: An Upper Lakes Centennial – Part One" (PDF). Detroit, Michigan: Great Lakes Maritime Institute.
- Bugbee, Gordon P. (March 1962b). "Iron Merchant Ships: An Upper Lakes Centennial – Part Two" (PDF). Detroit, Michigan: Great Lakes Maritime Institute.
- Colton, Tim (2016). "David Bell, Buffalo NY". Shipbuilding History.
- Johnston, J.E. (1957). "Telescope: Volume 6. – Number 4. (April 1957)" (PDF). Detroit, Michigan: Great Lakes Model Shipbuilders' Guild.
- Maritime History of the Great Lakes (1862a). "Merchant (Propeller), 12 Jul 1862". Ontario, Canada: Maritime History of the Great Lakes.
- Maritime History of the Great Lakes (1862b). "Merchant (Propeller), collision, 1 Nov 1862". Ontario, Canada: Maritime History of the Great Lakes.
- Maritime History of the Great Lakes (1866). "Merchant (Propeller), overboard, 1 May 1866". Ontario, Canada: Maritime History of the Great Lakes.
- Maritime History of the Great Lakes (1867a). "The Ice–Bound Fleet". Ontario, Canada: Maritime History of the Great Lakes.
- Maritime History of the Great Lakes (1867b). "Merchant (Propeller), aground, 19 Nov 1867". Ontario, Canada: Maritime History of the Great Lakes.
- Maritime History of the Great Lakes (1868). "Merchant (Propeller), aground, 13 Oct 1868". Ontario, Canada: Maritime History of the Great Lakes.
- Maritime History of the Great Lakes (1869). "Merchant (Propeller), collision, 1 Oct 1869". Ontario, Canada: Maritime History of the Great Lakes.
- Maritime History of the Great Lakes (1872). "Merchant (Propeller), sunk, 1872". Ontario, Canada: Maritime History of the Great Lakes.
- Maritime History of the Great Lakes (1873a). "Merchant (Propeller), 15 Mar 1873". Ontario, Canada: Maritime History of the Great Lakes.
- Maritime History of the Great Lakes (1873b). "Merchant (Propeller), 1 May 1873". Ontario, Canada: Maritime History of the Great Lakes.
- Maritime History of the Great Lakes (1873c). "Merchant (Propeller), collision, 1 Sep 1873". Ontario, Canada: Maritime History of the Great Lakes.
- Maritime History of the Great Lakes (1874a). "Merchant (Propeller), collision, 1 Apr 1874". Ontario, Canada: Maritime History of the Great Lakes.
- Maritime History of the Great Lakes (1874b). "Merchant (Propeller), collision, 1 Jun 1874". Ontario, Canada: Maritime History of the Great Lakes.
- Maritime History of the Great Lakes (1874c). "Merchant (Propeller), aground, 1 Jul 1874". Ontario, Canada: Maritime History of the Great Lakes.
- Maritime History of the Great Lakes (1874d). "Merchant (Propeller), aground, 1 Nov 1874". Ontario, Canada: Maritime History of the Great Lakes.
- Maritime History of the Great Lakes (1875). "Merchant (Propeller), aground, 6 Oct 1875". Ontario, Canada: Maritime History of the Great Lakes.
- Maritime History of the Great Lakes (1904). "Merchant (Propeller), 1862". Ontario, Canada: Maritime History of the Great Lakes.
- Meverden, Keith N.; Thomsen, Tamara L. (2008). "Wisconsin's Historic Shipwrecks – An Overview and Analysis of Locations for a State/Federal Partnership With The National Marine Sanctuary Program" (PDF). Madison, Wisconsin: Wisconsin Historical Society.
- Stanton, Samuel Ward (1895). "American Steam Vessels: Great Lakes Propeller Merchant, 1862". New York City: Smith & Stanton.
- Swayze, David (2001). "Great Lakes Shipwrecks – M". Port Huron, Michigan: Boatnerd. Archived from the original on June 15, 2002.
- Thompson, Mark L. (1994). Queen of the Lakes. Detroit, Michigan: Wayne State University Press. ISBN 0-8143-2393-6.
- Wisconsin Shipwrecks (2021). "Merchant (1862)". Madison, Wisconsin: Wisconsin Historical Society.
