= John Mitchell (chemist) =

American chemist and researcher

John F Mitchell
- Education: Cornell University (BA), University of Chicago (PhD)
- Organization: Argonne National Laboratory
- Awards: University of Chicago Distinguished Performance Award (2006); Presidential Early Career Award for Scientists and Engineers (2000); Department of Energy Early Career Award (1999)
- Website: https://www.anl.gov/profile/john-mitchell

John F. Mitchell is an American chemist and researcher. He is a past director of the materials science division at the U.S. Department of Energy's (DOE) Argonne National Laboratory and leads Argonne's Emerging Materials Group.

Mitchell's expertise is in the discovery, synthesis, crystal growth, and study of quantum materials, including correlated electron oxides, quantum magnets, and topological matter. He has authored or co-authored nearly 400 peer-reviewed articles in scholarly journals.

Mitchell is an Argonne Distinguished Fellow and is a fellow of the American Physical Society and of the American Association for the Advancement of Science, and a member of the Materials Research Society. He served in the chair line of the Division of Materials Physics of the American Physical Society from 2013 to 2017.

== Early life and education ==
Mitchell received his A.B. degree summa cum laude in chemistry from Cornell University in 1987, and his Ph.D. in chemistry from the University of Chicago in 1993 for theoretical studies of defect structures and order-disorder transitions of early transition metal chalcogenides.

Mitchell joined Argonne as a DOE Distinguished Postdoctoral Fellow in 1993. He went on to become a senior chemist in 2009 and an Argonne Distinguished Fellow in 2016. Mitchell became associate director of the Materials Science Division in 2012 and served as division director from 2017 to 2019. Mitchell is also an adjunct professor in the materials science and engineering department of the University of California, Santa Barbara.

== Research ==
Mitchell's research focuses on strategic synthesis, crystal growth, and structural studies of correlated electron transition metal oxides and chalcogenides, principally using neutron and x-ray scattering. He has coordinated the development team for a high-resolution powder diffractometer at the Advanced Photon Source, and led Argonne's strategic initiative in Materials and Molecular Design and Discovery. Mitchell has also led a project study in the DOE Center of Excellence for the Synthesis and Processing of Advanced Materials, entitled, "Spin Polarized Transport in Complex Oxides".

Early in his career, Mitchell focused on understanding the electronic and magnetic properties of 2D manganese oxides that exhibit colossal magnetoresistance (CMR). Among several key findings, Mitchell's work directly led to the widespread understanding of local polaronic distortions and the 'melting' of their short-range correlations as a mechanism behind the CMR effect.

Turning to heavy transition metals, Mitchell explored the behavior of iridium based oxides in which electron correlation and spin-orbit coupling meet on similar energy scales. Mitchell's group discovered evidence for electronic and magnetic properties in these systems that parallel those found in high-temperature copper oxide superconductors. Mitchell's group also found direct evidence of bond-directional anisotropy in the candidate quantum spin liquid Na_{2}IrO_{3}, validating the dominant role of this interaction.

Mitchell then discovered routes to grow single crystals of two-dimensional nickel oxides that, like the iridium systems, mimic cuprate superconductors. In a series of papers he and his group showed that these nickel oxides exhibit stripe phases, intertwined density waves, and strong in-plane orbital polarization believed to be key to superconductivity.

== Honors and awards ==
- Argonne Distinguished Fellow
- Fellow of the American Physical Society
- Fellow of the American Association for the Advancement of Science
- Member of the American Physical Society, American Crystallographic Society, Materials Research Society, and American Chemical Society
- Former fellow of the University of Chicago Institute for Molecular Engineering, 2015-2017
- Presidential Early Career Award for Scientists and Engineers, 2000
- Department of Energy Outstanding Young Investigator Award, 1999.
