= John Wendell Mitchell =

Canadian author

- Born: April 1, 1882; Mono Township, Ontario
- Died: October 18, 1951 (aged 69); Toronto, Ontario
- Education: Osgoode Hall
- Occupations: Lawyer, writer
- Writing career
- Pen name: Patrick Slater
- Notable work: The Yellow Briar

John Wendell Mitchell (April 1, 1882 – October 18, 1951) was a Canadian writer, best known for his work The Yellow Briar: A Story of the Irish on the Canadian Countryside.

== Early life ==
Mitchell was born in 1882, in Mono Township, Ontario, in what is now part of the Town of Mono. The area is occasionally figuratively referred to as the Caledon Hills, a reference to nearby Caledon Township, Ontario, now Caledon, Ontario. He lived on his grandfather's farm in Mono until 1894 when he moved with his mother to Toronto. He studied at Victoria College, before enrolling in Osgoode Hall Law School in 1902. He was called to the bar in 1907. He went on to practice law in Toronto for 28 years.

== Writing career and The Yellow Briar deception ==
Mitchell's first published work was The Kingdom of America (1930), an essay about Canada. In 1933 he published his first novel The Yellow Briar under the pen name Patrick Slater, about the experience of a poor Irish immigrant in Ontario. When it was originally published it was presented as an autobiography by the publisher. It was very popular, it was reprinted four times in 1934, eventually selling 10,000 copies at the height of the Great Depression. Even through it was eventually revealed, by The Globe, that Patrick Slater was a hoax and the work was entirely fictional it did not seem to effect the sales of the book.

Mitchell would go on to write two other novels The Water-Drinker (1937) and Robert Harding (1938), but was never able to match the success he had with The Yellow Briar. The Yellow Briar was republished in 1970 by Macmillan Publishers, and again in 1990 by Dundurn Press, and it is currently in print.

== Works ==
- The Kingdom Of America, The Canadian Creed, (1930)
- The Yellow Briar, (1933) [written as: Patrick Slater]
- The Water-Drinker, (1937) [written as: Patrick Slater]
- Robert Harding, (1938) [written as: Patrick Slater]
- The Settlement Of York County, (1952)

== Fraud and disbarment ==
In 1935, Mitchell confessed to police that he had fallen into debt and used his clients' money to rescue himself, in the amount of $20,000. He made a public confession and insisted that he be charged. He was given a sentence of six months and served it at Langstaff jail farm, he was also disbarred. As a consequence printings of The Yellow Briar were discontinued.

== Death ==
Mitchell died in Toronto in poverty and relative obscurity. When his financial situation became public, after his death, a fund was set up to cover the cost of his grave marker. His last book, The Settlement Of York County was published posthumously.
