= USS Alpha (1864) =

Tugboat of the United States Navy

History

United States
- Ordered: as Fred Wheeler
- Launched: 1863 in Philadelphia, Pennsylvania
- Acquired: 3 June 1864
- Commissioned: circa 1 November 1864
- Decommissioned: 1865 at the Washington Navy Yard
- Fate: Sold, 23 September 1865; destroyed by fire on 5 June 1886

General characteristics
- Displacement: 55 tons
- Length: 72 ft (22 m)
- Beam: 16 ft 6 in (5.03 m)
- Draft: 7 ft (2.1 m)
- Depth of hold: 6 ft 6 in (1.98 m)
- Propulsion: steam engine; screw-propelled
- Speed: 9 knots (17 km/h; 10 mph)
- Complement: 13
- Armament: 8 Enfield rifles; one spar torpedo

USS Alpha was a screw-propelled tugboat purchased by the Union Navy during the American Civil War. It was later fitted with a spar torpedo and operated in support of the Union Navy blockade of Confederate waterways.

== Service history ==
Alpha – a screw tug built at Philadelphia, Pennsylvania, in 1863 as Fred Wheeler – was one of six similar vessels purchased by the Union Navy at Philadelphia on 3 June 1864 to support its warships in widely varied ways and to help protect them and Army transports against surprise attacks by Confederate rams, torpedo boats, or other novel craft. Such raids had been a cause of great concern since the foray of the CSS Virginia into Hampton Roads, Virginia, on 8 March 1862 and the threat they posed had been underscored more recently by the Southern submarine H. L. Hunley's sinking of the Federal Navy's screw sloop of war Housatonic and the ironclad ram CSS Albermarle's destruction of the Southfield. Designated Picket Boat No. 1, the tug—commanded by Acting Ensign Nathaniel R. Davis—was assigned to the North Atlantic Blockading Squadron and first appeared on its list of vessels on 1 November 1864. She served on the James River for the last months of the Civil War protecting the Union shipping which supported General Ulysses S. Grant's troops operating against Richmond, Virginia.

However, when she and her sister tugs joined their squadron at Hampton Roads, Virginia, there were already six other smaller vessels on its rolls designated Picket Launch No. 1 through Picket Launch No. 6. Great confusion resulted and prompted the Navy—sometime between 1 November and 5 December 1864—to rename the former Fred Wheeler and her five sisters for the first six letters of the Greek alphabet – Alpha through Zeta. Thus, Picket Boat No. 1 became Alpha. Some sources indicate that Alpha – which was also called Tug No. 1 – entered the Norfolk Navy Yard for the installation of a spar torpedo; but, since Picket Launch No. 1 did carry a spar torpedo which Lt. William B. Gushing used to destroy Albemarle, it is reasonable to assume that similarity of names caused the two vessels to be confused and Alpha never received such a weapon.

Alpha's most exciting service occurred late in January 1865, when most of the more powerful Union warships had withdrawn from the James to participate in an attack on Fort Fisher, North Carolina, which defended Wilmington, North Carolina, the South's last open port. The Confederate Navy's squadron on that river had remained between Richmond, Virginia, and a line of obstructions across the James, awaiting a chance to engage its Union counterpart on favorable terms. Thinking that this temporary Federal weakness afloat in the area was just such an opportunity, Commander John K. Mitchell, CSN, removed some of the obstructions; and, on the evening of 23 January, led the Southern Navy's James River Squadron downstream and attempted to slip through the new gap in the cordon of hulks which separated them from the Union warships. The Davis Administration joined Mitchell in hoping that a Confederate naval victory on James would break General Grant's line of supply and communication and lift his siege of the Confederate capital.

When word of this threatening thrust reached Comdr. William Albert Parker – who commanded the Union naval forces remaining on the James—he dropped his ships downstream to a position where they could maneuver effectively during the expected battle. His vessels experienced great difficulty turning in the narrow, shallow, and meandering channel of the upper river; and Alpha assisted them to reach their new positions downstream. During the movement, several of Parker's warships—including his flagship, the double-turreted monitor Onondaga – ran aground; and Alpha proved to be invaluable by helping to refloat them. However, the navigational difficulties of the upper James impartially plagued both sides; and two of Mitchell's ironclads, one gunboat, and a torpedo boat also ran aground while attempting to slip through the gap despite fire from Union shore batteries. This development prompted Parker to return upstream to join in the bombardment. A shell soon struck the stranded gunboat Drewry, detonating her magazine; and the resulting explosion so damaged Scorpion, grounded nearby, that Mitchell ordered that gunboat abandoned. Then when the stranded ironclads were again afloat, the surviving Confederate warships retired to Richmond.

The highlight of Alpha's service on the James River was her participation in the expedition upstream to Richmond immediately after General Robert E. Lee's Army of Northern Virginia abandoned the desperately defended city. During this operation Malvern carried President Abraham Lincoln to the former Confederate capital where former slaves paid the President homage and showed him their warm appreciation. Alpha left the James in July 1865 and steamed to Washington, D.C. She was sold at public auction at the Washington Navy Yard on 23 September 1865 to William L. Wall and Company of Baltimore, Maryland. Redocumented as Alpha on 7 October 1865, she operated as a merchant tug for more than two decades. Her career was finally ended when she was destroyed by fire on 5 June 1886. Other details of her loss have not been found.
