= John Mitchell (Australian footballer) =

Australian rules footballer (1891–1962)

Personal information
- Full name: John Harold Mitchell
- Born: 31 January 1891; Brunswick, Victoria
- Died: 18 August 1962 (aged 71); South Melbourne, Victoria
- Height: 180 cm (5 ft 11 in)
- Weight: 83 kg (183 lb)

Playing career^{1}
Years	Club	Games (Goals)
1921	South Melbourne	1 (0)
- ^{1} Playing statistics correct to the end of 1921.

John Harold Mitchell (31 January 1891 – 18 August 1962) was an Australian rules footballer who played with South Melbourne in the Victorian Football League (VFL).
