= Jonathan Mitchell =

Jonathan Mitchell may refer to:

== Sportspeople ==
- Jonathan Mitchell (footballer) (born 1994), English footballer
- Jonathan Mitchell, a linebacker for the 2011 Lehigh Valley Steelhawks season
- Jonathan Mitchell (basketball), 2006 winner of the Mr. New York Basketball award
- Jonathan Mitchell (cyclist), British cyclist, bronze medalist in 2015 and 2017 British National Track Championships competitions

== Others ==
- Jonathan Mitchell (writer) (born 1955), American autism writer and activist
- Jonathan Mitchell (producer) in Who Do You Love? (2008 film)
- Jonathan F. Mitchell, American attorney, academic, and government official

== See also ==
- Jon Mitchell (disambiguation)
- John Mitchell (disambiguation)
- Joni Mitchell, Canadian singer-songwriter
