= John R. Mitchell (poet) =

American poet

John R. Mitchell (1940 – August 17, 2006) was a poet and a professor of English at Augsburg College in Minneapolis, Minnesota. He taught at the college for 36 years, dying at age 66. His work was featured in anthologies, such as 25 Minnesota Writers (Nodin Press, 1980), alongside the work of Jon Hassler, Patricia Hampl, and Carol Bly.

Born in Decatur, Alabama, Mitchell received a bachelor's degree from Maryville College in Maryville, Tennessee, and earned his master's degree in English from the University of Tennessee.

He served in the Peace Corps in Liberia. He drew on that experience in his short story, "The Volunteer". His poems were often published in the North Stone Review.

A literary prize is awarded in his name annually by Augsburg College, the John R. Mitchell Academy of American Poets Prize.
