= SS John Mitchell (1942) =

Liberty ship of WWII

History

United States
- Name: John Mitchell
- Namesake: John Mitchell
- Owner: War Shipping Administration (WSA)
- Operator: States Marine Corp.
- Ordered: as type (EC2-S-C1) hull, MCE hull 311
- Awarded: 1 May 1941
- Builder: Bethlehem-Fairfield Shipyard, Baltimore, Maryland
- Cost: $1,056,991
- Yard number: 2061
- Way number: 12
- Laid down: 28 July 1942
- Launched: 7 September 1942
- Sponsored by: Mrs. John Green
- Completed: 19 September 1942
- Identification: Call sign: KHJL
- Fate: Laid up in the National Defense Reserve Fleet, Beaumont, Texas, 11 June 1948; Sold for scrapping, 15 February 1967, withdrawn from fleet, 18 May 1967

General characteristics
- Class & type: Liberty ship; type EC2-S-C1, standard
- Tonnage: 10,865 LT DWT; 7,176 GRT
- Displacement: 3,380 long tons (3,434 t) (light); 14,245 long tons (14,474 t) (max)
- Length: 441 feet 6 inches (135 m) oa; 416 feet (127 m) pp; 427 feet (130 m) lwl
- Beam: 57 feet (17 m)
- Draft: 27 ft 9.25 in (8.4646 m)
- Installed power: 2 × Oil fired 450 °F (232 °C) boilers, operating at 220 psi (1,500 kPa); 2,500 hp (1,900 kW)
- Propulsion: 1 × triple-expansion steam engine, (manufactured by General Machinery Corp., Hamilton, Ohio); 1 × screw propeller
- Speed: 11.5 knots (21.3 km/h; 13.2 mph)
- Capacity: 562,608 cubic feet (15,931 m^{3}) (grain); 499,573 cubic feet (14,146 m^{3}) (bale)
- Complement: 38–62 USMM; 21–40 USNAG
- Armament: Varied by ship; Bow-mounted 3-inch (76 mm)/50-caliber gun; Stern-mounted 4-inch (102 mm)/50-caliber gun; 2–8 × single 20-millimeter (0.79 in) Oerlikon anti-aircraft (AA) cannons and/or, 2–8 × 37-millimeter (1.46 in) M1 AA guns

SS John Mitchell was a Liberty ship built in the United States during World War II. She was named after John Mitchell, an American labor leader and president of the United Mine Workers of America from 1898 to 1908.

== Construction ==
John Mitchell was laid down on 28 July 1942, under a Maritime Commission (MARCOM) contract, MCE hull 311, by the Bethlehem-Fairfield Shipyard, Baltimore, Maryland; she was sponsored by Mrs. John Green, the wife of the president of IUMSWA), and was launched on 7 September 1942.

== History ==
She was allocated to States Marine Corp., on 19 September 1942. On 11 June 1948, she was laid up in the National Defense Reserve Fleet, Beaumont, Texas. On 15 February 1967, she was sold for scrapping to Southern Scrap Material Co., for $45,000. She was removed from the fleet on 18 May 1967.

== Bibliography ==
- "Bethlehem-Fairfield, Baltimore MD". www.ShipbuildingHistory.com. 14 August 2008.
- Maritime Administration. "John Mitchell". Ship History Database Vessel Status Card. U.S. Department of Transportation, Maritime Administration.
- Davies, James (May 2004). "Specifications (As-Built)" (PDF). p. 23.
- "SS John Mitchell".
