= John Mitchell (minister) =

American minister

John Mitchell (29 December 1794 – 28 April 1870) was an American minister and author.

== Life ==
He was the son of John and Abigail (Waterhouse) Mitchell, and was born in Chester, Connecticut, on 29 December 1794. He graduated from Yale College in 1821. In the autumn of 1821, he entered Andover Theological Seminary, but left after about nine months, in consequence of impaired health. In January 1824, he became the editor of the Christian Spectator, a religious and theological monthly published in New Haven. He continued in this employment until 1829, in May of that year he was licensed, and soon after preached his first sermon in the pulpit of his brother (Rev. William Mitchell) in Newtown, Conn. In Dec, 1830, he was ordained as the first pastor of the First (Congregational) Church in Fair Haven, Conn. After remaining there six years, he was settled, 6 December 1836, as pastor of the Edwards (Congregational) Church in Northampton, Mass. At the close of the year 1842, ill health compelled him to resign his charge there, and he spent the following year abroad in the hope of recovery. Though he was benefited, and his life doubtless prolonged by this change, he was never able to resume the labors of the ministry. Most of his remaining years were spent in Stratford, Conn, where he employed himself, as strength would allow, in literary work. While at Fair Haven, he had written a manual of the Congregational polity, entitled The New England Churches. After his return from Europe, he published Notes from Over Seas (2 vol.), in which he aimed to give, not merely his own experience as a traveler, but a collection of interesting facts relating to the political, religious, and social status of the countries which he had visited. He afterwards published Scenes and Characters in College, My Mother, or Recollections of Maternal Influence, and Rachel Kell. He also published occasional sermons, and contributed to periodicals, and was editorially connected with different newspapers. At the time of his death he had nearly completed a book of sketches under the title of Derwent.

He was married, 13 October 1825, to Mary A. Tomlinson, daughter of Charles Tomlinson, M.D., of Stratford. He had three sons, two of whom survived him. He died in Stratford, Connecticut, 28 April 1870, aged 75 years.
