= John Mitchell (British Army officer) =

Major-General John Mitchell
- Born: 11 June 1785; Stirlingshire
- Died: 9 July 1859 (aged 74); Edinburgh
- Burial place: Canongate Kirkyard
- Military career
- Allegiance: United Kingdom
- Branch: British Army
- Service years: 1803–1859
- Rank: Major-General
- Unit: 1st Royals
- Conflicts: Napoleonic Wars; Walcheren Campaign; Peninsular War; Battle of Bussaco; Battle of Fuentes d'Onoro; Battle of Sabugal; Hundred Days; Battle of Waterloo (WIA)
- Other work: Author

Major-General John Mitchell (11 June 1785 – 9 July 1859) was a British Army officer and author.

== Biography ==
John Mitchell was born 11 June 1785 in Stirlingshire. His father was a member of the diplomatic service who served as consul-general for Norway, and engaged on missions to the court of Stockholm and Copenhagen. In 1797 Mitchell went to Berlin with his father, who was despatched on a mission to the court of the new king, Frederick William III. He was placed at the Ritter academy at Lüneburg. In 1801 he was sent to a mathematical school in London, and on 9 July 1803 was commissioned as ensign in the 57th regiment. On 5 December 1804 he was promoted to a lieutenancy in the 1st Royals, and went with the 1st battalion of his regiment to the West Indies. On 1 October 1807 he was promoted captain in the 1st Royals. In 1809 he joined the 3rd battalion of his regiment at Walcheren, and was present at the Siege of Flushing.

He served with the same battalion in the Peninsula from 1810 to 1812, and was present at the battles of Busaco and Fuentes d'Onoro in the action of Sabugal, and in those of the retreat of Massena. He accompanied the 4th battalion on the expedition under Major-general Samuel Gibbs to Stralsund in 1813, but served on the staff as a deputy assistant quartermaster-general. He also served in a similar capacity in the campaign of 1814 in Holland and Flanders, and with the headquarters of the army of occupation in Paris. His knowledge of languages made him of use to Wellington in correspondence and negotiations with the allied powers. He was promoted major on 19 July 1821, and placed on the unattached half-pay list on 1 June 1826. His father died in Edinburgh on 17 October the same year.

Mitchell did not return to military duty, but devoted himself to literature, passing a considerable portion of each year on the continent up to 1848, after which he spent the remainder of his life with his sisters in Edinburgh. In 1833 and 1834 he contributed a series of articles to Fraser's Magazine, under the name of 'Bombardino,' or 'Captain Orlando Sabretache.' In 1837 he published an account of the life of Albrecht von Wallenstein. Between 1841 and 1855 he contributed to the United Service Journal, and in 1841 to 1842 he wrote seven letters to The Times dealing with defects in the British army.

In 1845 he published 'The Fall of Napoleon,' and soon after received a diamond brooch from King Augustus of Hanover for his work. He also received a complimentary letter from Robert Peel. In 1846 he contributed to Fraser's Magazine a series of articles on Napoleon's early campaigns. He was promoted lieutenant-colonel unattached on 10 January 1837, colonel 11 November 1851, and major-general on 31 August 1855. He died in Edinburgh on 9 July 1859, and was buried in the family vault in the Canongate churchyard.

== Bibliography ==
- The life of Wallenstein, duke of Friedland. London: James Fraser. 1837.
- Thoughts on tactics and military organization: with an enquiry into the power and position of Russia. London: Longman, Orme, Brown, Green and Longmans. 1838.
- The Art of Conversation, with Remarks on Fashion and Address. London: G.W. Nickisson. 1842.
- The Fall of Napoleon: An Historical Memoir. London: G.W. Nickisson. 1845.
- Schmitz, Leonhard, ed. (1865). Biographies of Eminent Soldiers of the Last Four Centuries. Edinburgh and London: W. Blackwood and Sons.
