= Rocky Point, Montana (ghost town) =

Ghost town in Montana, United States

Coordinates: 47°36′22.54″N 108°26′45.72″W

The historic town of Rocky Point was on the south side of the Missouri River in Fergus County, Montana, in the Missouri Breaks. Rocky Point was located at a natural ford on the Missouri River.

In prehistoric times, American bison trailed down through the breaks to Rocky Point to cross the river. During the Missouri River steamboat era (1860s to 1880s), the buffalo trail system leading to and from the ford caused Rocky Point to become a steamboat landing, which received freight for mining camps in the Judith Mountains (to the south) and in the Little Rocky Mountains (to the north) and also for Fort Maginnis built in 1880. In the 1870s and 1880s, Rocky Point had a store, hotel, two saloons, a feed stable, a blacksmith shop and a ferry. Due to its remote location in the Missouri Breaks, in the 1870s and 1880s Rocky Point became a refuge for outlaws who turned to rustling cattle and horses until rancher-vigilantes took punitive action in 1884.

From 1886 to 1936 it had a post office nearby which was known as Wilder, and so the community of Rocky Point was sometimes also called Wilder. The community at the Rocky Point ford continued through the homesteading years from 1900 to 1918, but faded away when the ferry ceased to function in the 1920s, and it finally disappeared in 1936 when the Army Corps of Engineers condemned and bought up land adjacent to the Missouri River that might possibly be affected by Fort Peck Dam, then being built.

Today some historic but deteriorating structures still remain on the site, which is now on the Charles M. Russell National Wildlife Refuge operated by the U.S. Fish and Wildlife Service. Being on public lands, the Rocky Point ford area may be approached by "dirt" roads and visited, but the roads become impassable when wet.

== Before 1900 – steamboat landing, wood hawk yard, Missouri River crossing point and ferry ==
=== Prehistoric crossing point on the Missouri ===
At Rocky Point the Missouri River flows over a Bearpaw shale reef. This provided a rocky bottom and a low-water ford. This geologic feature made Rocky Point a crossing point on the Missouri for migrating bison since prehistoric times. The migrating herds established trails from the broad grassy plains on the north and south of the river, down through the breaks to the site of Rocky Point.

=== Steamboat landing – 1860s to the 1880s ===
With the discovery of gold in the Montana Territory in the early 1860s, the Missouri River became the main thoroughfare by which passengers and freight, particularly bulky freight, was moved by steamboats between the gold fields in the territory and the "states". In Montana the river ran through the Missouri Breaks for hundreds of miles. The breaks are steeply eroded badlands that severely limit access to the Missouri River. Rocky Point naturally became a steamboat landing because of its system of prehistoric buffalo trail system that led from the ford up through the breaks to the plains that lay north and south of the river.

The steamboat era lasted from the mid-1860s until the coming of the railroad in the mid to late 1880s. After 1874, when the Northern Pacific Railroad reached Bismarck, the riverboats usually brought freight from that river port to the terminus port at Fort Benton. Rocky Point's steamboat landing received and sent only the freight and passengers generated by local demand in the surrounding sparsely settled area. Steamboats had to get up to Ft. Benton on the spring rise in the Missouri River flow, caused by the outflow of snowmelt from the mountains. High water was in June, after which the level in the river fell. During low-water periods many larger boats bound for Fort Benton were forced to unload at points lower down on the river. These unloaded cargoes were either freighted overland, picked up by smaller boats or stored until the next high-water season. Some of this interrupted freight traffic during low water seasons on the Missouri brought business to the Rocky Point landing, but in low water the steamboats attempted to reach Cow Island landing, further up the river, because from Cow Island there was a better freight route up Cow Creek to Fort Benton.

Gold discoveries in the Judith Mountains, at Maiden, and in the Little Rocky Mountains increased interest in Rocky Point as a landing point for the mill machinery coming by boat. The mines in the Judith Mountains, to the southwest of Rocky Point, were discovered in 1880. The gold strikes in the Little Rockies (a small outlier mountain range on the eastern Montana plains) was first made as a placer gold strike in 1884, but this placer strike only lasted a few years.

By 1881 Rocky Point was the designated Missouri River steamboat landing point for people and goods coming and going from Fort Maginnis, 63 miles (101 km) away.

The Northern Pacific Railroad completed its line through the southern portion of Montana in 1883, which severely reduced steamboat traffic to Fort Benton. In 1887 the Great Northern Railroad built through the area just north of the Missouri River breaks, and this finally terminated steamboat traffic on the Missouri.

=== Wood hawk yards – 1860s to the 1880s ===
Wood hawk yards developed along the Missouri River to supply fuel to passing steamboats. At these remote locations men known as wood hawks would harvest trees from cottonwood groves along the river and stack the wood in cords along the river banks. Steamboats traveling on the Missouri would stop and buy the cords of wood to burn for fuel.

The flat on the south side of the river near Rocky Point became one of the many wood hawk camps along the river. In 1868 Lohmire and Lee were located there. In 1871 fugitives from an Indian encounter sought refuge at a woodchopper's cabin there.

=== Buffalo hide hunters – late 1870s to 1883 ===
After 1876, military campaigns against Indian tribes reduced the danger from roving and hostile bands of Indians on the Eastern Montana plains. Buffalo hides had a market because they were used for belting for industrial machines. As the threat from Indian bands decreased, commercial market hunters for buffalo, sometimes called "hide hunters", began to roam over the Eastern Montana prairie and kill buffalo in large numbers, taking only the hide. Commercial hunters in the vicinity of Rocky Point brought their hides down to the steamboat landing, where a middleman—usually a local merchant—bought the hides and then shipped them east by steamboat. By 1883 there were so few buffalo left that the day of the commercial market hunter came to an end.

=== Missouri River crossing point for cattle herds ===
As cattle replaced buffalo on the plains of eastern Montana, the ford at Rocky Point became a crossing point for large cattle herds. A large rancher trailing a herd to the ford at Rocky Point during a drought had this experience:

At last we were nearing the Missouri River, intending to cross at Rocky Point. The wind was from the north and cattle smelled the water and broke for it. No power on earth could stop the poor thirsty beasts; bellowing and lowing they ran pell-mell for the water, with the cowboys in hot pursuit. There was a point of quicksand in the river just above the ford and before the men could prevent it the cattle had plunged into it and were miring down. A small steamboat tied at the landing used their donkey engine to help drag out some of them, but we lost seventy head in spite of our best efforts. After this mishap we crossed the herd without further trouble and from here on there was more water and better grass.

=== Ferry ===
The trail system down to the ford at Rocky Point made it a natural point to have a ferry. As long as Rocky Point was used as a Missouri River crossing point in the breaks, the ferry continued, from the 1880s to the late 1920s.

By 1885 John Tyler was the ferryman. Stock detective Charles Siringo journeyed from Lewistown, Montana, to the Little Rocky Mountains, and described his crossing of the Missouri River at Rocky Point:

I arrived in Rocky Point on the south bank of the Big Muddy river three hours after dark. Here I found old man Tyler and his son running the ferry and keeping a small Indian trading store.

In 1907 Elmer Turner bought the ferry at Rocky Point from Tyler, and he ran the Ferry until 1927, when he dismantled it and used the lumber in buildings at Rocky Point.

== Gumbo mud in the Missouri Breaks ==
When the clay dirt of the Missouri Breaks becomes wet, it first becomes slick then it becomes sticky and clumps up around any surface that comes in contact with it. The sticky nature of the mud is because the clay has a high bentonite content. The Missouri Breaks are notorious for this sticky "gumbo mud".

Travelers to Rocky Point in wet weather encountered this mud. It was exhausting to travel through. Charley Siringo, the famous stock detective, rode horseback to Rocky Point on his favorite mare, intending to cross the Missouri River, on his way from Lewistown to Landusky in the Little Rocky Mountains. After Siringo had started into the Missouri Breaks (which he refers to as the "Bad Lands"), he encountered the "sticky mud" of the Missouri Breaks:

... the sticky mud of the 'Bad Lands' was something fearful. It would stick to the mare's feet till the poor animal could hardly gallop. I had seen many kinds of sticky mud in my life, but nothing to equal this."

When Siringo dismounted,

I found I couldn't get my foot in the stirrup, owing to the mud that was stuck fast to it. Here my early cowboy training in the art of fancy swearing came in play, as it seemed to relieve my mind, while the mud was being scraped off my foot with a knife.

When he finally got to Rocky Point, Siringo's mare was exhausted.

My mare had only traveled 30 miles, but she had carried about 75 pounds of mud across the "Bad Lands", hence she was almost played out on arriving at Rocky Point. I had often heard of the "Bad lands" and wanted to visit them, but now that desire had vanished.

== Settlement in Montana Territory ==
In the Missouri Breaks a ferry and a place to cross stock over the Missouri River were rare, and a community grew up at Rocky Point. Rocky Point became a meeting place and center of trade for miners, woodhawks, trappers, buffalo hunters, whiskey traders, ranchers and cowboys. Rocky Point served legitimate local businessmen and ranchers, but also became a place where thieves and outlaws lived.

In 1880, C. A. Broadwater, Helena merchant and entrepreneur, moved his warehouse upriver from Carroll landing to the vicinity of Rocky Point. He erected buildings and named the settlement "Wilder" after Amherst H. Wilder, his business associate from St. Paul, Minnesota. Broadwater received shipments being forwarded to Fort Maginnis. He requested military aid, and a detachment of 19 men was sent to Wilder in order to guard government freight until it was shipped to Fort Maginnis.

In 1885, Rocky Point had grown to one store, one hotel, one feed stable, two saloons, a blacksmith shop and the ferry run by Jimmy Taylor. The store was run by R. A. Richie, and a 40-by-90-foot (12 m × 27 m) warehouse was run by M. F. Marsh, who also ran his bar and hotel.

Teddy Blue Abbott, a cowboy who later became a ranch owner and who wrote a book about his life, had these observations about Rocky Point in the 1880s:

There were a few stores at Rocky Point, and a saloon run by a man named Marsh, and three white women. One was Mrs. Marsh, a very nice lady who kept the eating house. She had a daughter. And there was also a woman they called Big Ox, who was one of those haybags that used to follow the buffalo camps. They had the damnedest names, those big old fat buffalo women. ... We was in a wilderness and we had to make the best of it. As for Big Ox, I have heard men say that when a man is starving he would eat crumbs and worse than crumbs.

== Refuge and gathering place for outlaws and rustlers in the early 1880s ==
In the 1870s Rocky Point lay in the heart of the Missouri Breaks, where extensive badlands run along the Missouri River for hundreds of miles. This area lay on the margins of several territorial counties and was thus remote from any county seat. The appearance of a county sheriff or his deputy in the Breaks was a rare event, and the presence of law enforcement was nonexistent. Persons in trouble with the law gathered at Rocky Point because it provided a refuge that was remote from interference by law officers. If the sheriff of one county showed up, the outlaws could saddle up and swim their mounts across the Missouri, and be in another county beyond the sheriff's jurisdiction and thus beyond the risk of arrest.

The outlaws resided in the river bottoms and masqueraded as buffalo hunters, Indian traders or wood hawks. Rocky Point in the 1870s and 1880s was well known to be a tough town.

Extending out from the Missouri Breaks, both to the north and south, were the vast grasslands of the eastern Montana prairies. In the early 1880s the buffalo on these ranges were hunted to near extinction, and were replaced by large herds of cattle, most trailed up from Texas. Large ranches developed, based on a deeded "homeplace" located along water courses, but with the grazing cattle on adjacent broad stretches of public lands, referred to as "open range". These ranches kept large herds of horses. This environment provided an opportunity for thieves residing in the breaks—they rustled stock from herds on the plains on one side of the Missouri River, drove them into remote reaches of the breaks, changed their brands, and then drove the stock to the other side of the river, to reach communities where the stock could be sold. Rustling horses was most common because horses could be driven much faster than cattle.

Rocky Point was associated with this system of rustling because stolen stock could be crossed from one side of the river to the other at the Rocky Point Ford. The thieves would range south as far as Wyoming, and north as far as Canada.

As the incidents of horse stealing became more and more common in the area, the consensus of the surrounding ranching community was that "there were rustlers' rendezvous at the mouth of the Musselshell, at Rocky Point and at Wolf Point [in Montana Territory]".

== Vigilantes visit in 1884 ==
In 1884 Granville Stuart, an early pioneer and rancher (operator-owner of the large DHS ranch located south of the Breaks near Fort Maginnis), organized a strike force that went into the Breaks, seeking out and summarily hanging (or shooting it out with) suspected rustlers. Estimates of rustler casualties ran from a low of 13 to a high of 35, but probably were closer to 18 or 20.

Rocky Point was visited by the vigilantes in 1884.

At the time the vigilante committee started for the mouth of the Musselshell, another party left for the vicinity of Rocky Point where two notorious horse thieves, known as Red Mike and Brocky Gallagher, were making their headquarters. They had stolen about thirty head of horses from Smith river, changed the brands and were holding them in the bad lands ... When the vigilantes arrived at Rocky Point the men were not there but had crossed over to the north side of the river. The party followed after, and captured them and recovered some of the horses. Both men pled guilty to horse stealing and told their captors that there were six head of the stolen horses at Dutch Louie's ranch on Crooked Creek.

Both Red Mike and Brocky Gallagher were hanged by the vigilantes. As a result of the vigilantes' attentions, rustling declined in the breaks.

== Acquisition of the alternative name of Wilder, Montana, and continuation into the 20th century ==
The end of the Missouri River steamboat era came with the completion across Montana of the Northern Pacific Railroad line in 1883, followed by the construction into Montana of the Great Northern Railroad line in 1887. Rocky Point was still a crossing point on the Missouri, but it was not located between any major towns and only attracted limited traffic.

In 1886 a post office was created in the Rocky Point area and given the name of Wilder, which name originated with C. A. Broadwater (see above). The Wilder post office operated from 1886 to 1939. Robert A. Richie became the first postmaster. In 1888 Welter S. Collins was postmaster. In 1889 Philander D. Freese was postmaster at Wilder. Fredrick J. Bourdon then became postmaster, and in 1895 A. L. Monroe took the job. Three months later James Tyler became the postmaster.

After the creation of the post office, the general community at the crossing point on the Missouri was still known as Rocky Point, but the post office was known as Wilder, and sometimes the community was also referred to as Wilder.

As long as the ferry functioned, Rocky Point remained a local gathering place. It became a polling place for elections. During the election of 1878 there was a polling place at Rocky Point. In 1886 there were 53 votes in the election and the judges were Richie, the postmaster, Tyler, a store owner and ferry operator, and Pike Landusky, a miner and bar owner and generally colorful character.

In 1888, Marsh's saloon at the Rocky Point ford burned down and he rented a building from E. C. Bartlett. R. A. Richie moved away to Glasgow, where he died of typhoid fever.

In 1889 Montana became a state. At that time Rocky Point was in Chouteau County, but all of Chouteau County south of the Missouri River was traded off to Fergus County for $2,500, and Wilder became part of Fergus County.

In 1900, Rocky Point still remained a river crossing with a ferry, an operating store and bar to serve the area. Tex Alford ran a saloon across the river. After 1900 homesteaders began to arrive in greater numbers on the eastern Montana prairie. In 1905 Margaret Frost was the postmaster at Wilder. In 1907 Elmer Turner took over the store at Rocky Point and the Wilder post office. He also bought the ferry at the Rocky Point crossing from Tyler. Turner homesteaded and lived at the ford until 1935, when the government purchased all the land in the Missouri valley for the Fort Peck Dam.

In 1918 the Wilder Post Office was moved from the area close to the ford, to Luella M. Belyea's homestead on top of the river hill. Mr. Elmer Turner maintained the ferry at Rocky Point/Wilder until the winter of 1929, when he used the lumber to roof a new log shop and in another building which still stands. Elma M. Webb took over the Wilder post office on November 4, 1920. The original handmade boxes, counter and shelves from the river were installed in her home, where she also ran a store. During Elma Webb's tenure from 1920 to 1935, the mail came from Roy on Monday and Friday of each week.

After the ferry was dismantled in 1929, Rocky Point ford ceased to function either as a ferry or a community, but the concept of community continued at the Wilder Post Office, though no longer at the site of the original ford. Local people continued to congregate at the Wilder Post Office and store in the home of Elma Webb. Wilder was in voting precinct #30 and was a polling place from its origin until 1942, when the last election was held at the Little Crooked School house with John Mauland, Edith McNulty and Ray McNulty as judges.

Upon the death of her husband, Elma Webb leased her place to Elna Brumfield Wright and turned the Wilder Post Office over to her on December 15, 1935. Elna put the store/post office charge of her brother-in-law, Stanley Wright, on June 4, 1936. Bertine Mathison leased the Webb place and became postmaster in 1937. Fire destroyed the building, and the Wilder Post Office was discontinued November 30, 1939, which also spelled the end of Wilder as a successor to Rocky Point.

== Consideration as a site for a highway bridge in 1931 ==
In 1931 Rocky Point was considered as the site for a bridge over the Missouri River to connect a north–south highway which was projected to be built through the Missouri Breaks to connect Lewistown (south of the breaks) and Malta (north of the breaks). The positive features of Rocky Point bridge site were (1) a good foundation in the Bearpaw Shale at the site, and (2) the river channel was not prone to wander at this place. In addition, in comparison to other sites, Rocky Point had a lower estimated price for both the bridge and for the approach roads through the breaks. However, before the Montana legislature could take action, the 1930s depression caused all road building plans to be placed on hold. By the time interest in the highway project revived in the 1950s, Rocky Point was passed over in favor of another location upstream where the bridge was eventually built.

== Absorption into the Ft. Peck Dam project in 1935 ==
In 1936 the land at the site of Rocky Point became the property of the U.S. government, when the Army Corps of Engineers condemned and bought up all the river bottom land that might possibly be affected by Fort Peck Dam, then being built. This ended all community activity at the site of the river ford at Rocky Point. All the families who had lived on the ranches and homesteads along the Missouri River moved away. The lands at the Rocky Point ford have remained in federal control since that time. They are now part of the Charles M. Russell National Wildlife Refuge operated by the U.S. Fish and Wildlife Service.

Several historic structures still exist down along the Missouri near the site of the Missouri River ford. They are in deteriorating condition.

== Field trip ==
Approach roads and site are on public lands in the Charles M. Russell National Wildlife Refuge, operated by the U.S. Fish and Wildlife Service. The refuge is easily accessible on public roads. The coordinates and a "Google Earth" review, or utilization of a DeLorme atlas of maps will provide directions from U.S. Highway 191 to Rocky Point.

Off the highway, roads are mostly all "dirt". They are inaccessible when wet. Although the description by Charles Siringo quoted above of the difficulties with sticky mud in the breaks is over a hundred years old, it is still applicable.

The website for the Charles M. Russell National Wildlife Refuge has downloadable maps, and provides information on "Current Refuge Road Conditions" on the home page, specifically noting impassable places, but warns that their list may not be complete or up to date.

== See also ==
- List of ghost towns in Montana
