= LaBarge =

LaBarge or Labarge is the surname of the following people:

- Bernie LaBarge (born 1953), Canadian guitarist, singer, and songwriter
- Joseph LaBarge (1815–1899), American steamboat captain
  - LaBarge Rock in Chouteau County, Montana, U.S.
- Joseph Marie LaBarge, Senior (1787–1860), Canadian frontiersman, trapper and fur trader
- Margaret Wade Labarge (1916–2009), Canadian historian and author
- Suzanne Labarge (born 1940), Canadian businesswoman and chancellor of McMaster University

== See also ==
- La Barge (disambiguation)
- DeBarge
