= Cow Island, Montana =

Island in Montana, United States

Coordinates: 47°46′20″N 108°56′52″W

Cow Island lies in a left turning bend of the Missouri River, in the area known as the Missouri River Breaks. The island is formed by sediments that are seasonally washed out from the mouths of Cow Creek and Bull Creek, which enter the Missouri River just upstream from Cow Island. The island is about 1.2 miles long and averages about 150 yards in width. It is located in extreme northern Fergus County, but lies across the river from extreme southern Blaine County, to its east.

Cow Island was significant in Montana's pre- and early history period as a Missouri River ford, and during the segment of Montana territorial history from about the mid-1860s to the mid-1880s, when it was used as a trans-shipment point for freight going upstream by steamboat to Fort Benton Montana. Cow Island's historic significance is related to its geographic location. Access to the Missouri River was difficult along a 200-mile stretch of river, because the Missouri breaks form a barrier to travel on each side of the river. However, a travel route known as the Cow Island Trail went north from Cow Island up Cow Creek, by-passing the breaks and emerging onto the Montana plains. This outlet through the Missouri Breaks caused Cow Island to be utilized as a historic Missouri River ford in the Missouri Breaks area. Starting in the 1860s this access route also caused Cow Island to become a steamboat landing site from which freight was moved up Cow Creek on the Cow Island Trail to Fort Benton and other destinations. During the Nez Perce War in 1877 the Nez Perce forded the Missouri at Cow Island, and it became the site of the Battle of Cow Island.

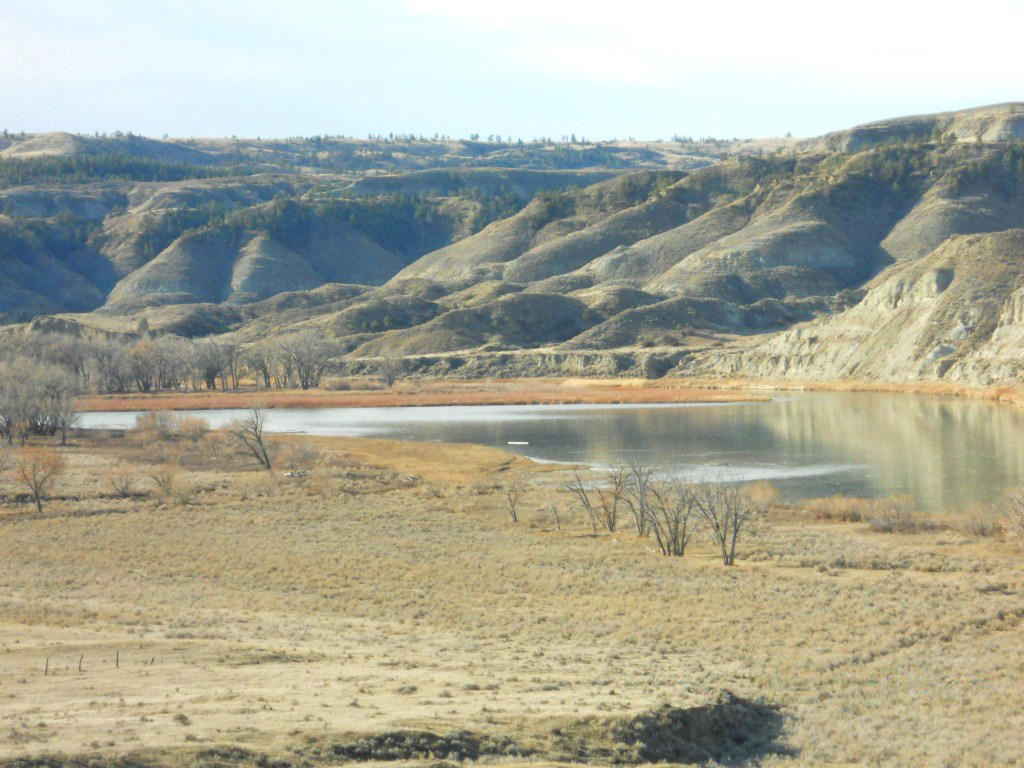
The upstream end of Cow Island in the Missouri River. View from site near mouth of Cow Creek. The Missouri Breaks south of Missouri River in background

== The Missouri Breaks ==
To understand the historical significance of Cow Island, one has to first know the basic facts about the Missouri Breaks. The Missouri Breaks are steeply eroded badlands along the east–west trending Missouri River. The breaks extend along the river from below Fort Benton down to Fort Peck, a distance of over 200 miles. The breaks also reach out for miles into the prairie from both the south and north bank of the Missouri River. The breaks are so difficult to access that this stretch of the Missouri River is still one of the most remote and untouched areas of Montana.

The breaks were formed during the last ice age, when a continental ice sheet extended down from Canada, and blocked off the previous drainage of the Missouri. The ice sheet backed water up into a large lake that filled a basin where Great Falls is now located. The rising lake waters finally broke out from the ice dam. As the lake waters rushed out, they carved a new river channel for the Missouri along the edge of the existing continental ice sheet. This sudden erosive action cut out the current channel of the river from below present Fort Benton, to the present Fort Peck Dam. This new channel was cut into soft Cretaceous age sedimentary rock, and tributaries then eroded down to the Missouri from each side. The tributaries were quickly carved by water erosion into the same soft Cretaceous age layers on both sides of the new river channel, thus creating the steeply eroded badlands known as the Missouri Breaks.

== The Missouri River ford at Cow Island ==
After the close of the last ice age, about 10,000 years ago, Cow Island was the site of a much used ford on the Missouri River, in the Missouri Breaks area. It was used by migratory buffalo herds and by bands of native people who foraged and hunted on the Montana prairies north and south of the Missouri River. For over 100 miles east and west from Cow Island the Missouri Breaks border the river. The badlands topography in the breaks make the river difficult to reach, and thus restrict access to the river.

Animals and people could get down to the river at Cow Island by traveling along Cow Creek. Cow Creek provided a 25-mile-long route of travel from the northern plains to the river. This route to the river by-passed the rough topography of the breaks. Once the river was reached, Cow Island divided the broad Missouri River into two channels, making the river easier to ford. South from Cow Island a steep but relatively short four mile trail led through the breaks to the central Montana grasslands.

Cow Island is not the only ford in this area of the breaks, but it is the Missouri ford that was easier to approach compared with than other fords in the breaks area.

== The Steamboat Landing at Cow Island ==
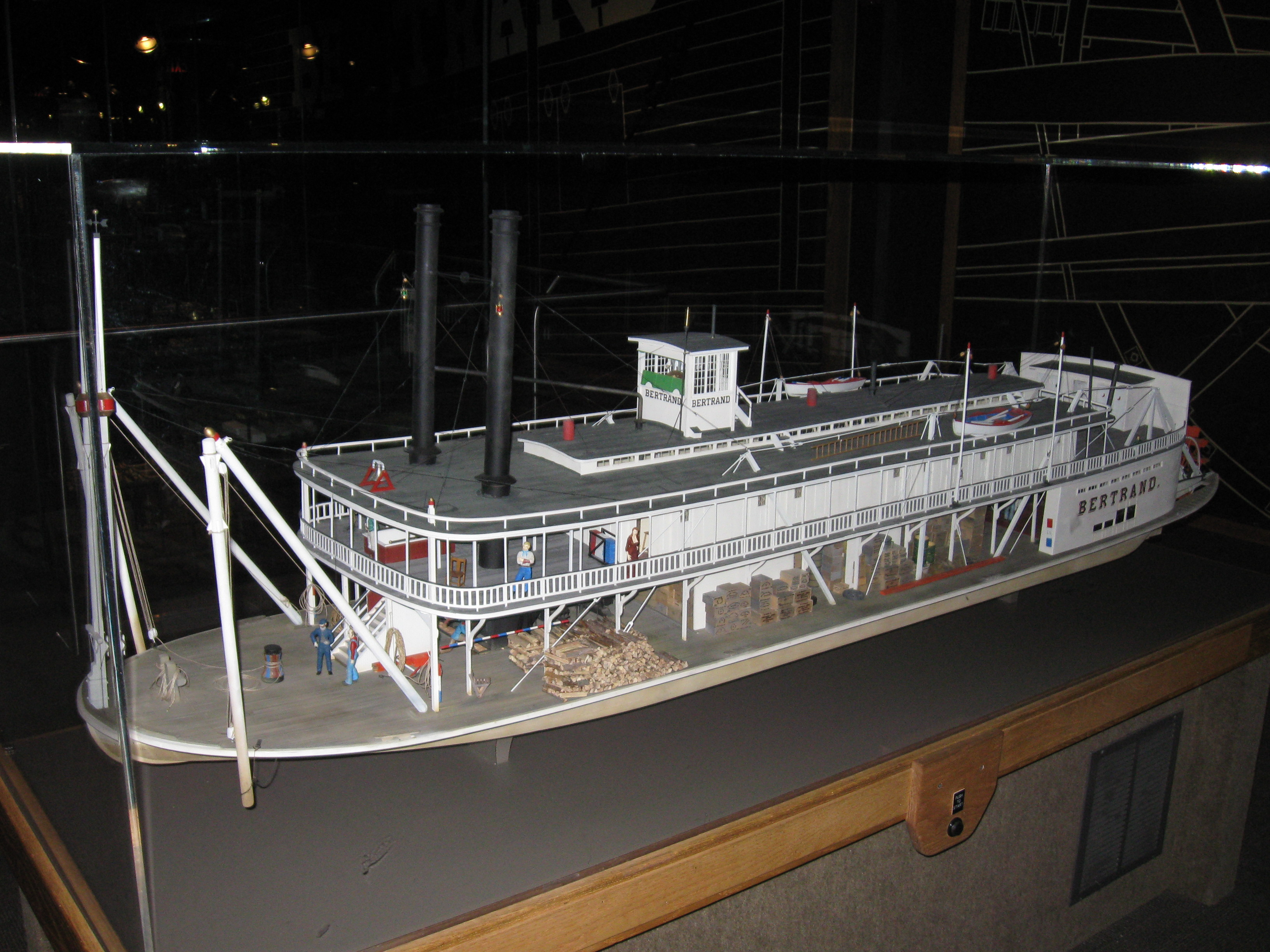
Model of Upper Missouri River stern-wheel steamboat Bertrand, which sank on April 1, 1865, while heading up the Missouri for Fort Benton, Montana Territory

Cow Island was used as a steamboat landing from about the early 1860s to late 1880s. During this approximately 20-year period, freight was transported to the Montana gold fields by Missouri River steamboat. The destination of the steamboats was Fort Benton at the upper limit of steamboat navigation on the Missouri. In mid to late summer river volumes went into seasonal decline. The river became shallower, and heavier draft steamboats could not pass a series of rapids above Cow Island, specifically the Dauphine Rapids, and thus steamboats could not reach the upriver port of Fort Benton. Steamboats had to offload their freight at a downstream landing in the Missouri Breaks. A common landing site in the breaks was at Cow Island, because the offloaded freight could then be taken overland to Fort Benton using a travel route up Cow Creek. Cow Creek was one of the few routes by which freight wagons could get from the river, up through the breaks, to the plains. Using Cow Creek as a travel route, freight could be moved overland from Cow Island landing on the river through the Missouri breaks onto the Montana prairie and on to Fort Benton.

On some years when there was not a severe decline in the levels of the Missouri in the late summer, steamboats did not have to offload at Cow Island. On other years, when the river fell drastically every steamboat had to offload there. Because of this seasonal variability no permanent community was established at Cow Island landing. Shipping freight to Ft. Benton was very lucrative. Therefore, the freight that was offloaded did not stay long at Cow Island landing before it was loaded onto freight wagons and taken up Cow Island trail to be sold at Fort Benton. Because of this swift transfer of freight during the late summer and fall, the freight was simply tarped, after it was offloaded, and no freight storage buildings were ever constructed.

Cow Island ceased to be a steamboat landing when the railroads came to Ft. Benton in the late 1880s. Cow Island landing's twenty-year run as a transhipment point on a busy artery of commerce was over.

== The Cow Island Trail ==
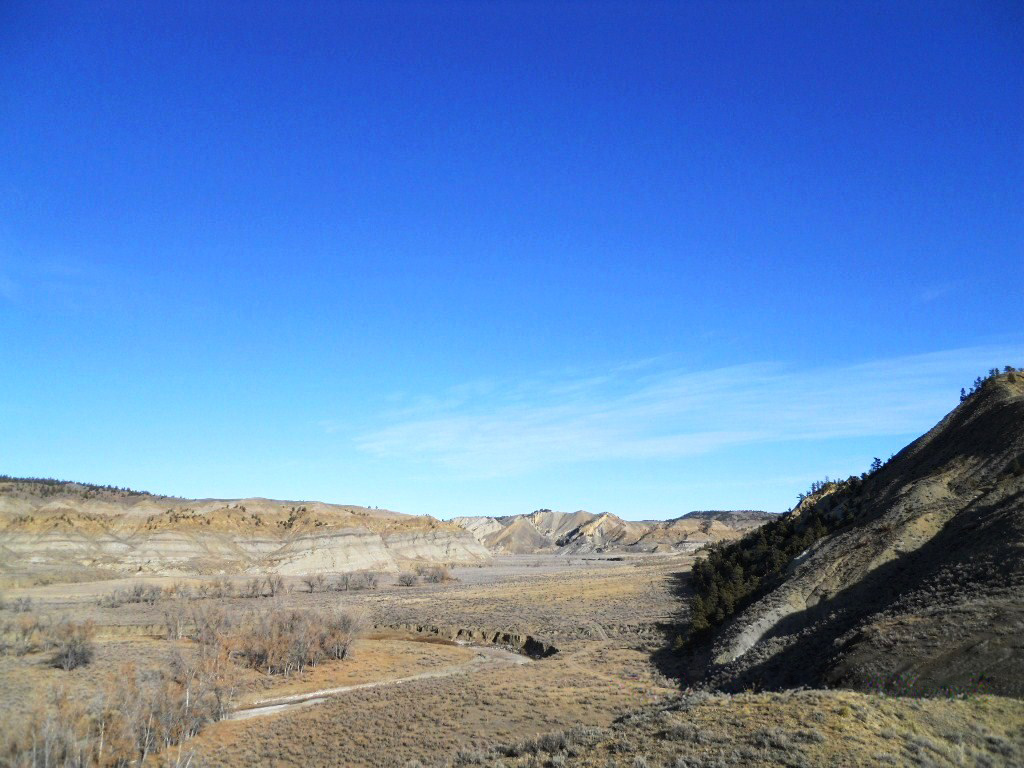
View up Cow Creek, where the Cow Creek Trail ran. Note how the creek bottom provides access through the breaks.

The wagon road that started at Cow Island Landing and went up Cow Creek was known as the Cow Island Trail. After traversing the breaks, the freight road extended up onto the Montana prairie, from whence it ran on to Ft. Benton. The tons of freight dropped off by steamboats at Cow Island Landing were carried up this trail in large covered wagons, sometimes hitched in tandem and pulled by 6 to 12 span of oxen or mules.

The probable path of the Cow Island Trail was up Cow Creek for about 15 miles (24 km), then up Davidson Coulee ridge, then west into the plains and on to Ft. Benton. As Cow Creek flows down its valley bottom, it meanders from one precipitous sidewall to the other. While traveling up Cow Creek freight wagons crossed Cow Creek 31 times.

The usual outfit was two wagons and several spans of mules, horses or oxen. Mules and oxen could pull more weight than horses, but freighters favored oxen over mules to pull the wagons. Indians would steal mules and horses, but would not steal the oxen. The climb out of Cow Creek, up Davidson Coulee ridge was steep and the road was narrow. Freighters would separate the wagons and then "double team" each wagon to the top of the grade. Accounts exist of wagons that were inexpertly handled dropping a wheel off the grade and then rolling off the road, taking the team with them to the bottom of the grade.

The Charles Russell painting, "The Wagon Boss" depicts freight wagons being pulled up a steep grade by a long span of oxen. The footnoted source shows a picture of this painting. A "bull whacker" is guiding the teams with a long whip mounted on a pole. The span of oxen are having to swing wide to bring the wagons along the track in the extreme foreground of the painting. The wagon boss waits on his horse for the team at the top of the grade. A whip is coiled around his neck. In the background is the community of Ft. Benton, confirmed by the adobe fort among the buildings along the Missouri River. The freight on the wagons depicted in the painting has arrived at Fort Benton, either by steamboat, or by freight from Cow Island, and is being freighted on to Helena. While the wagons are shown in the Fort Benton area, the same type of wagons were used to bring freight up the Cow Island trail from Cow Island landing to Fort Benton.

After railroads supplanted the steamboat, Cow Island landing ceased to be used as a transhipment point for freight, and the traffic died away on the Cow Island Trail. Today the name Cow Island Trail is attached to a gravel/dirt road that covers part of the original freight route between Cow Island landing and Ft. Benton. The gravel road known as the Cow Island Trail goes east and west south of the Bear Paw Mountains; the western end is the Judith Landing Road, and the eastern end is at Cow Creek itself at a point about 15 miles upstream from the mouth of Cow Creek on the Missouri. This last 15 mile segment of the old trail down Cow Creek to the Missouri is unused today, although faint traces of the original route can be seen on the ground. On this stretch of the old Cow Island Trail the creek crossings have washed out and today this part of the original route is difficult if not impossible to traverse by vehicle.

== The Battle of Cow Island, and later events with the Nez Perce on Cow Creek ==
Cow Island was the site of the Battle of Cow Island on September 23, 1877. The Nez Perce were fleeing from pursuing Army units toward Canada. They crossed the Missouri at the Cow Island ford on September 23. At the Cow Island landing a small detachment of soldiers were guarding government and private goods offloaded from steamboats and awaiting overland passage to Fort Benton. The Nez Perce crossed the Missouri in the area of the Cow Island Ford in an orderly and organized manner. The soldiers had retreated into shallow entrenchments around their camp. The Nez Perce numbered about 300; the soldiers had a dozen men, and four civilians of which one was killed, Private Byron Martin of the 7th infantry, and two civilians wounded, E.W. Buckwalter and George Trautman.

Later in the day, a delegation of the Nez Perce returned to the entrenched detachment and made a peaceful but urgent request, begging for food supplies from the sergeant in charge of the detachment. The sergeant only responded with a tiny parcel of food. The weaknesses of the army detachment were many. They had only a tiny handful of soldiers; their camp was poorly entrenched; their position in the river bottom could be fired on from the adjacent bluffs in the breaks, and (most importantly) their camp was separated by a significant distance from the tons of freight stacked against the bluffs, which they were supposed to guard. The Nez Perce took brilliant advantage of these weaknesses. As darkness fell, Nez Perce warriors fired on the entrenched soldiers from the bluffs. While the army unit was thus pinned down behind their shallow entrenchments, the Nez Perce broke into the freight storage area under cover of night and took what they wanted.

The next day, the Nez Perce moved up Cow Creek, but on September 25, 1877, they again engaged in a rear guard action in what is sometimes referred to as the Battle of Cow Creek Canyon, repulsing a pursuing army unit under command of Major Igles. On the same day, they ransacked and then burned a freight wagon train they overtook on the Cow Creek trail.

Further up Cow Creek the Nez Perce held a council. Thinking they had now outdistanced their pursuers, they made a fateful decision to stop to rest, which they did a few days later, when east of the Bear Paw mountains. This delay allowed Gen. Nelson A. Miles to catch up to the Nez Perce with fresh army units from Ft. Keogh, Montana. In the ensuing five-day Battle of Bear Paw (September 30 to October 5, 1877) the Nez Perce were surrounded and decimated leading to Chief Joseph's famous surrender speech to Generals Howard and Miles.

== Cow Island today ==
The advance of technology has removed Cow Island's significance as a Missouri River ford. Cow Island is no longer on a route of travel. The buffalo herds and the foraging bands of nomadic people are long gone. Railroads spelled the end of steamboat traffic on the Missouri, and Cow Island ceased to be a transhipment point on a route of commerce. Modern travel routes go elsewhere to traverse the breaks; U.S. Route 191, the only highway through the breaks area, crosses the river some 20 miles downstream on the Fred Robinson Bridge.

Cow Island is now included in the Upper Missouri River Breaks National Monument, which is under management of the Bureau of Land Management. The Cow Creek area of the Missouri Breaks is currently being evaluated for Prairie Wilderness status.

Cow Island has reverted to just another distant spot in one of the more remote areas of Montana. Deserted homestead buildings on the bottoms of Cow Creek and adjacent Bull Creek attest to the difficulty of agricultural pursuits in this remote area.

Access to Cow Island today is difficult. A BLM dirt road approaches from the east along ridge tops. It drops off the ridges to reach Bull Creek, and then the mouth of Cow Creek, which is just upstream from Cow Island. The latter part of this road is steep and not maintained. It is rutted and has washouts. This road is absolutely impassable in wet weather.

== See also ==
- Chief Joseph
- Battle of Bear Paw
- History of Montana
- Upper Missouri River Breaks National Monument
