= Eye of the Needle =

Eye of the needle or eye of a needle is the tunnel-like space near one end of a sewing needle.

Eye of the Needle also may refer to:

== Text works ==
- Biblical parable/metaphor of the camel and the eye of the needle
- The Eye of the Needle – Towards Participatory Democracy in South Africa, (1973) by philosopher Rick Turner
- Eye of the Needle (novel), 1978 novel by Ken Follett

== Film and television ==
- The Eye of the Needle (film), 1963 film directed by Marcello Andreie
- Eye of the Needle (film), 1981 film directed by Richard Marquand, based on the novel by Ken Follett
- "Eye of the Needle" (Star Trek: Voyager), the seventh episode of Star Trek: Voyager

== U.S. places ==
- Eye of the Needle, a previous name of the SkyCity revolving restaurant in the Seattle Space Needle
- Eye of the Needle (Montana), a rock formation

== Songs ==
- "Eye of the Needle", a song on the 2001 album Regeneration (The Divine Comedy album)
- "Eye of the Needle", a song by Dilated Peoples on the 2004 album 20/20
- "Eye of the Needle", a song by The Datsuns on the 2008 album Headstunts
- "Eye of the Needle" (song), 2014 song by Sia Furler

== See also ==
- Needle's Eye, an architectural folly in Wentworth, South Yorkshire
