= LaBarge Rock =

- LaBarge Rock (right half of picture, in silhouette), a dark igneous columnar monolith, eroded from white sandstone cliffs along Missouri River, in the Missouri Breaks of Montana.

Highest point
- Coordinates: 47°54′40″N 110°03′42″W

Geography
- Location: Chouteau County, Montana

Geology
- Orogenies: Intrusion of igneous rock into sedimentary rock followed by uplift and differential erosion
- Rock age(s): Late Cretaceous – Early Paleogene, 66 mya

LaBarge Rock in Chouteau County, Montana (occasionally referred to as La Barge Rock) is a dramatic landform in the shape of a large rock column or pillar, rising 150 feet (46 m) from waters' edge of the Missouri River. It was named in honor of Captain Joseph LaBarge, a steamboat captain who cruised the Missouri River in the mid nineteenth century. Besides having a striking appearance, LaBarge Rock is located in a picturesque riverside setting which has attracted artists and photographers over two centuries. Access is difficult; the pillar is located at Missouri River BLM mile-mark 56 in the White Cliffs section of the remote Missouri Breaks area of Montana. The pillar is composed of massive dark alkilik igneous rock, in striking contrast to the long white sandstone cliffs that form its backdrop. Because of the isolation of the Missouri Breaks area LaBarge Rock and the White Cliffs appear today much as they did when seen by Lewis and Clark in 1804 on the outward leg of their journey of exploration.

== Name origin ==
LaBarge Rock was named for Captain Joseph LaBarge (1815–1899) who was a famous pioneering steamboat captain on the Missouri. He plied the upper Missouri river in Montana during the boom years of upper Missouri river travel. From 1859 to 1890 steamboat transportation between lower river ports in Missouri up to the head of navigation at Fort Benton, Montana Territory, was the common mode by which passengers and freight got to and from the mining camps and ranches of central and western Montana. Occasionally the land form is called La Barge Rock, an alternative spelling of Captain LaBarge's name.

== Geology ==
The pillar is fine grained alkalic igneous rocks, formed of dark minerals. Historically, the pillar was formed as an "intrusion" during the Paleogene to late Cretaceous geologic period (about 66 million years ago). At that time, the source rock material was heated to a fluid state deep in the earth and then it was injected by force upward into overlaying sedimentary "country rock" of white sandstone and shale.

At the time of the intrusion both the hot molten rock and the recipient sedimentary rock were buried deep below the surface of the earth. As the molten liquid igneous rock (often referred to as "magma") was forced upward and outward into the sedimentary rock, it displaced and cracked the surrounding rock structures. After intrusion the molten liquid rock cooled and hardened. Where the molten rock liquid filled in horizontally between rock layers, it formed sills; when it filled in vertical cracks it formed dikes; where the intrusion formed a blunt bullet shaped plug this was called a stock.

The material forming LaBarge Rock was injected in the form of a stock. Over geologic time crustal movement brought these injected igneous rocks to the surface of the earth. The darker, denser igneous material of the injected rock is more resistant to erosion and weathering than the surrounding softer white sandstone and shale, so the harder igneous rock weathered out into distinctive land forms. The LaBarge Rock stock weathered out into the pillar shaped land form seen today.

In this area of the Missouri Breaks, along the Missouri River there were other intrusive emplacements which have weathered out from the surrounding white sandstone/shale formations, forming promontory features of dikes and sills, and stock. Along the river these features include LaBarge Rock, as well as Dark Butte, Citadel Rock, Grand Natural Wall, Pilot Rock and Steamboat Rock. The background of white sandstone/shale cliffs run along this stretch of the Missouri River for miles. North of the river, some of the natural features formed from intrusive rock are Eagle Buttes, Birdtail Butte and Chimney Rock.

== Height ==
The top of the pillar is at an elevation of 2,647 feet (807 m). The top of the rock is at a height of 150 feet (46 m) above the level of the river.

== History ==
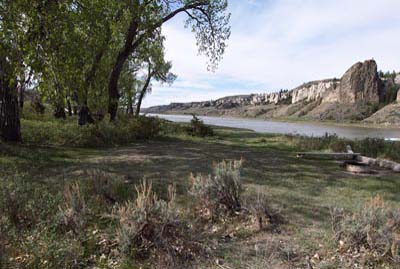
LaBarge Rock (dark pillar against white sandstone, extreme right of photo) as seen from Eagle Creek camping area, site of Lewis and Clark camp on May 31, 1805

In their outward bound leg of the voyage of exploration, Lewis and Clark camped opposite LaBarge Rock on May 31, 1805, at the mouth of Eagle Creek This area, across the river from LaBarge Rock, is now a campground for boaters floating the Missouri, and is referred to as Eagle Creek campground or sometimes as LaBarge campground.

== Missouri River White Cliffs ==
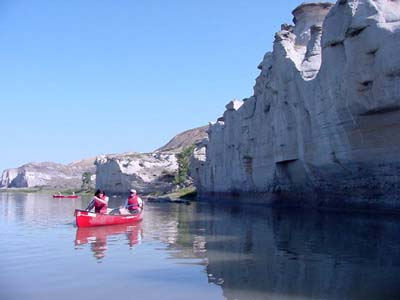
Boaters in the White Cliffs section of Missouri River in the Missouri Breaks (LaBarge Rock not pictured)

LaBarge Rock is part of the White Cliffs (aka White Canyon or White Rocks) region of the Missouri, along with other natural features and cultural sites in this area. It is named for the extensive cliffs of white sandstone/shale that appear on both banks of the river for long stretches. This section of the river is within the remote and isolated Missouri Breaks. Because of the White Cliffs' arresting appearance which received recent exposure from Stephen Ambrose's book on the Lewis and Clark's Expedition, "Undaunted Courage", there have been growing numbers wishing to float this portion of the Missouri from Coal Banks Landing (BLM Mile 41) to Judith Landing (BLM Mile 88).

== Art ==
Karl Bodmer (1809–1893) was a Swiss painter who accompanied German explorer Prince Maximilian from 1832 through 1834 on his Missouri River expedition in the then remote regions of the American west. He recorded images of Indian tribes and noteworthy sites. In August 1833 he made pencil drawings and water colors of LaBarge Rock which later became incorporated into Tableau 41 and Tableau 34. Tableau 41 focuses on LaBarge Rock, and is entitled "View of the Stone Walls on the Upper Missouri". Click on the preceding reference to view a photo of this artwork.

LaBarge Rock is directly across the river from the mouth of Eagle Creek. Thomas Hart Benton painted 'Lewis and Clark at Eagle Creek' in his unique style in 1967, but the angle of view of this painting is such that it does not depict LaBarge Rock, focusing instead on another view from Eagle Creek of the spectacle of the White Cliffs running along the river. Click on the preceding footnote to see a photo of this Benton painting. LaBarge Rock would be just out of the left edge of the painting.

LaBarge Rock is not easily accessible, as it exists along the Missouri River in the remote area of Montana known as the Missouri Breaks. Nevertheless, its appearance is so dramatic that it is often photographed by the people who float the river. An internet search of images for "LaBarge Rock" will reward the searcher with a variety of photographic views of the land form.

== Commentary ==
Clay S. Jenkinson an American humanities Rhodes scholar, Danforth Scholar, and author had this impression on visiting LaBarge Rock.

"Yesterday morning, we floated past the exact spot where Maximilian's colleague, the Swiss watercolorist Karl Bodmer, painted what one historian has called “the most spectacular vista of the voyage.” It's the image of the Stone Gates, off in the distance upriver, with a romantic castellated white bluff in the right foreground and a brown columnar monolith called La Barge on the left bank in the middle distance. (You can Google it). I turned just enough in my canoe to take a handful of photographs without tipping over.

It was thrilling, beyond thrilling, to have gazed at that painting a hundred times over the years, to have written about it, and now to have camped literally IN the painting. And then, the morning after, to have turned around as we drifted down the Missouri River in canoes and to have seen precisely what Bodmer saw 177 years ago. The landscape is essentially unchanged. Think of that. That's one reason they call Montana the last best place."

More succinctly the author of "A Float Down the White Cliffs Section of the Missouri River, July, 2002" described the LaBarge Rock area:

"...outrageous...awesome..."

== Location ==
The site of LaBarge Rock is not easy to visit. It is in the White Cliffs section of the Missouri River. Back from each side of the river are sharply eroded badlands, part of the Missouri Breaks, that are so rough that roads through the breaks down to the river (and thus to specific sites along the river) are primitive and thinly distributed across a large area. However, opposite the site of LaBarge Rock, there is a campground that exists for boaters floating the river (referred to as Eagle Creek Campground or sometimes LaBarge Campground) that can be reached from the north and east bank by primitive dirt road, but this road crosses private land and access over that private land may be restricted. The most common way to visit the White Cliffs area, including LaBarge Rock is to float this section of the Missouri River. The White Cliffs section of the river may be boated in one long day trip, from Coal Banks Landing (BLM mile-mark 41) to Judith Landing (BLM mile-mark 88) if a motorized boat is utilized, or during a more relaxed float-and-paddle river expedition lasting several days. This float trip has become increasingly popular in recent years.

LaBarge Rock may be climbed even by those who do not have technical rock climbing skills by taking gullies at the river's edge that lead up and around the side of the pillar to side away from the river, at which place there is reportedly enough erosion of the pillar that the top may be gained with some acceptable difficulty in climbing. This route is described in a book, "A River Calling", by Glenn Frontin.

== See also ==
- Eye of the Needle (Montana)
- Karl Bodmer
- Missouri River
- Prince Maximilian of Wied-Neuwied
