= Eye of the Needle (Montana) =

Sandstone arch in Montana, United States

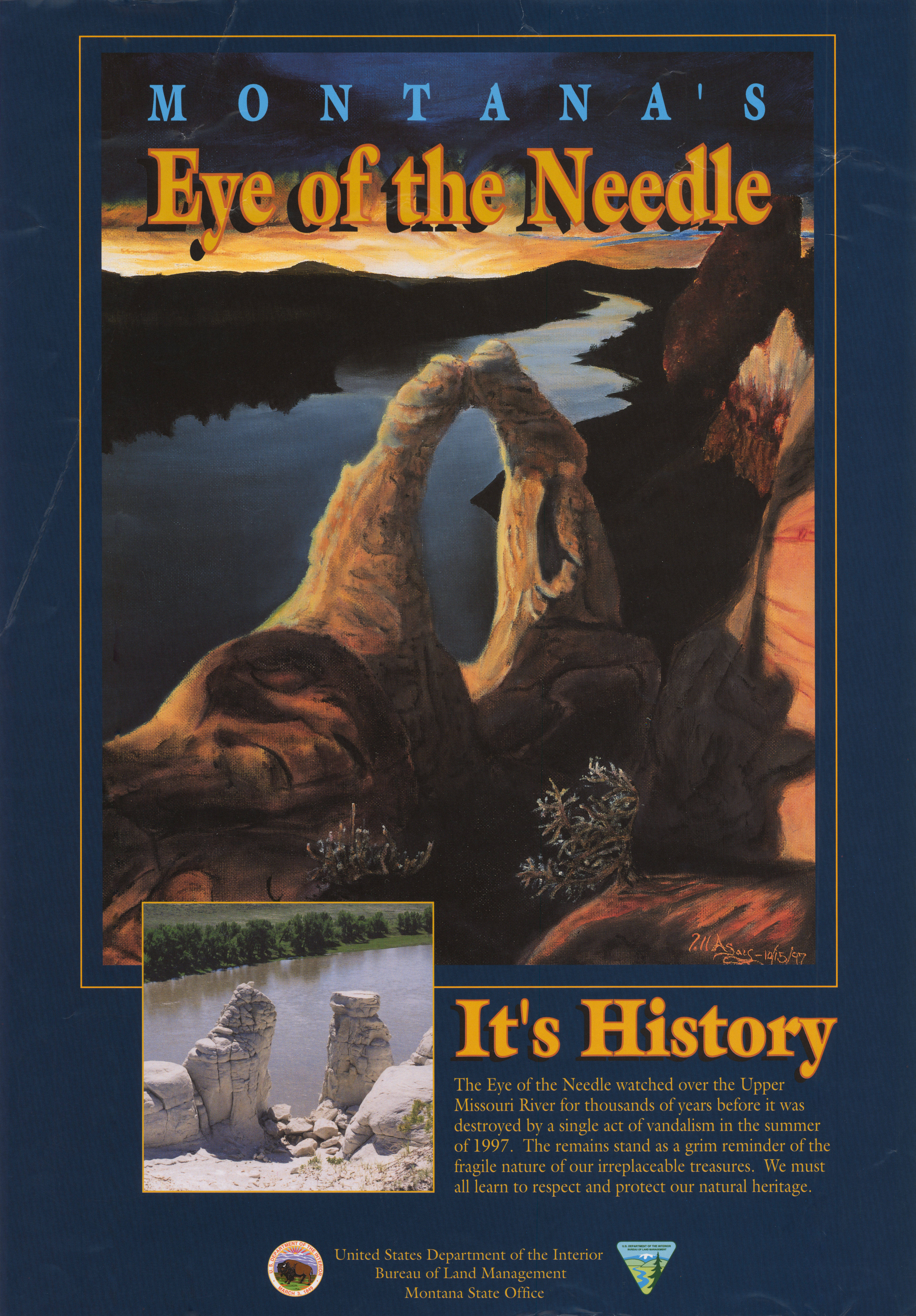
- Poster of the Eye of the Needle

Highest point
- Coordinates: 47°54′40″N 110°03′42″W

Geography
- Location: Chouteau County, Montana

Geology
- Orogenies: Intrusion of igneous rock into sedimentary rock followed by uplift and differential erosion

Eye of the Needle was a sandstone natural arch located along the Missouri River near Fort Benton, Montana. At some point prior to May 27, 1997, it experienced considerable damage, though the cause of that damage is unclear.

== History ==
The Eye of the Needle was an 11 feet (3 m)-high naturally occurring geographic formation shaped much like an inverted "V". It was located along a section of the Upper Missouri National Wild and Scenic River, on land administered by the Bureau of Land Management (BLM), approximately 56 miles (90 km) downstream from Fort Benton and adjacent to LaBarge Rock, another notable rock formation. The arch was described by Meriwether Lewis in his journal during the 1805 Lewis and Clark Expedition up the Missouri River.

The arch was discovered in a state of destruction on May 27, 1997, by an outfitter during a guided river trip. The top 4 feet (1 m) of the arch had fallen, leaving two pillars. Six other columns near the arch on the south side of the river were also toppled. Early reports suggested that vandals had destroyed the arch. The Justice Department launched an examination of the area and investigators concluded that vandals had used a long tool to gain leverage and topple the arch. Later reports blamed drunken teenagers for the vandalism and a reward of $22,000 was offered for information about the incident. The event received widespread attention and became an educational opportunity for the BLM to raise awareness about the vandalism of public resources.

Public outcry led officials to debate the benefits of rebuilding the arch. After some consideration, the BLM decided a replica of the formation would be built near the Fort Benton levee, with the remnants of the arch left intact along the river.

In 2002, writer Rick Graetz suggested that the arch was not destroyed by vandalism, but rather through the normal process of erosion and weathering. Other experts agree with Graetz. They have cited the lack of human debris found by the Justice Department's investigation, the difficulty in reaching the arch (either by ascending steep cliffs or taking a long hike), and the lack of any arrests in the case despite the large reward offered.

== See also ==
- LaBarge Rock
- Rock formations in the United States
- Upper Missouri River Breaks National Monument
