= La Barge =

La Barge may refer to:

- La Barge, Wyoming, United States
- La Barge (Puy-de-Dôme), a village in the commune of Saint-Priest-des-Champs, France
