= Cow Creek (Montana) =

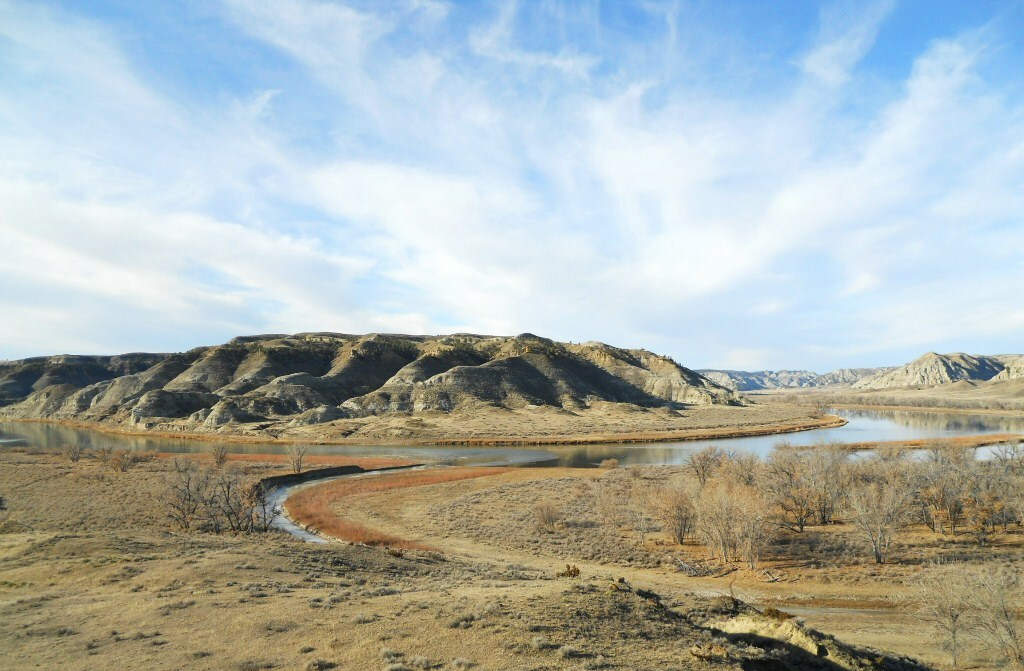

- Location of mouth in Montana

Location
- country: United States
- state: Montana
- county: Blaine

Physical characteristics
- Source: Bear Paw Mountains
  - coordinates: 48°05′28″N 109°20′07″W
- Mouth: Missouri River
  - coordinates: 47°47′15″N 108°56′10″W
- Length: 35 miles (56 km)

Cow Creek is a tributary of the Missouri River, approximately 35 miles (56 km) long, in north central Montana in the United States. Cow Creek rises in the southern foothills of the Bear Paw Mountains in western Blaine County and flows east and then south, joining the Missouri approximately 25 air miles (40 km) northeast of Winifred, Montana—or 22 miles (35 km) upstream from the Fred Robinson Bridge.

== Name ==
The creek's Gros Ventre name is báasikɔ́hʔɔ́wuh, meaning 'big gulch'.

== History ==
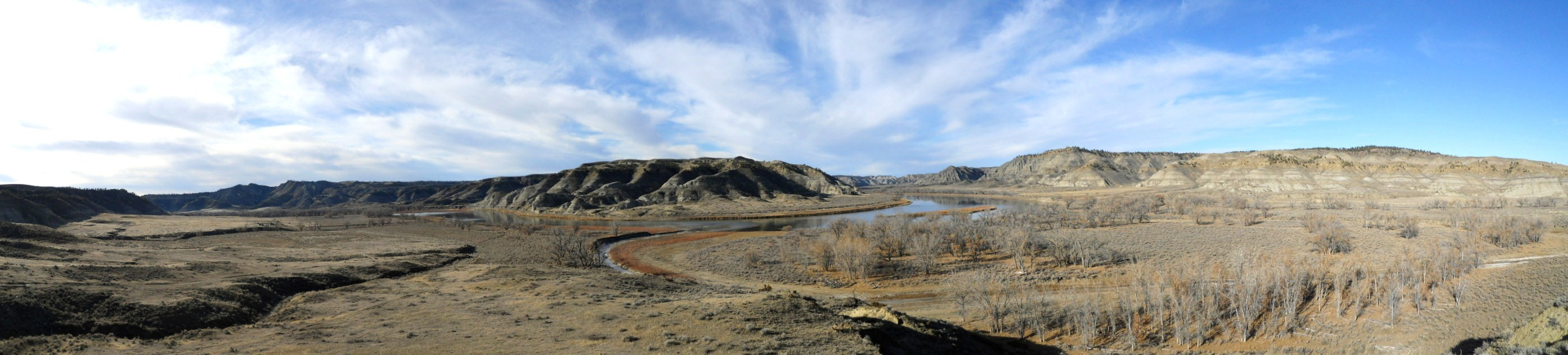
The junction of Cow Creek and Missouri River.

=== Prehistory ===
Cow Creek flows from the southern foothills of the Bear Paw Mountains to the Missouri through a unique and remote area known as the Missouri Breaks. The breaks are extensive and steeply eroded badlands. They are so rough that they are a barrier to travel by animals or man. They extend along the Missouri River for over 200 miles (320 km). In this long stretch of river the Missouri Breaks extend back from the river on either side, for many miles. As the Missouri flows through this 200 mile stretch, the breaks limit access to the river from the wide undulating grasslands north and south of the river.

Cow Creek provides one of the few access routes down to the Missouri River through the Missouri Breaks. As Cow Creek flows through the breaks it passes between high canyon like walls, but the stream meanders back and forth over a canyon floor that is relatively level and from 100 to 600 yards (91–549 m) in width.

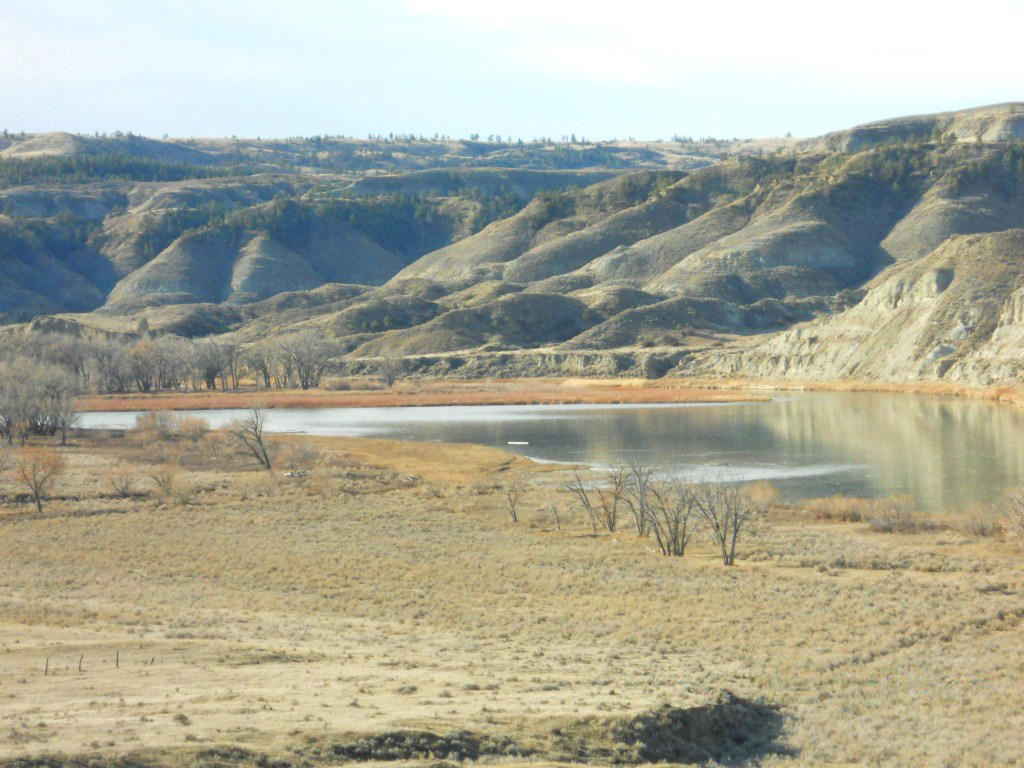
The upstream end of Cow Creek Island, downstream from the mouth of Cow Creek

The canyon bottom along Cow Creek creates a corridor of travel from the northern Montana plains down to the river through the breaks. Sediments seasonally washed out from the mouth of Cow Creek into the Missouri River formed Cow Island, just downriver from the creek mouth. Cow Island divides the Missouri into two channels, which makes crossing the broad Missouri easier at this point. On the south side of the river opposite the Cow Island, a steep but relatively short four mile climb out of the breaks gains the wide plains of Central Montana south of the river.

This combination of geographic features made Cow Creek and the ford at Cow Island an ancient highway of travel. For thousands of years, Cow Creek and the Cow Island ford was used by migrating buffalo herds and other migrating animals, and by nomadic Native Americans bent on going between the plains north of the Missouri River Breaks and the plains lying south of the Missouri Breaks.

=== Lewis and Clark expedition ===
Lewis and Clark passed Cow Creek on May 26, 1805, after they had camped two miles below Cow Creek. Cow Creek was originally named Windsor Creek in the journals of the expedition for Pvt. Richard Windsor, but was later named Cow Creek by fur traders. May 26, 1805 was the day that Clark climbed out of the breaks (probably going up Bull Whacker Creek, and climbing up on a ridge), where he saw the Rocky Mountains for the first time. When Windsor/Cow Creek was noted by Lewis, it was reported to be 30 yards wide, which meant it would be in spring flood stage. Normally Windsor/Cow Creek would be a few yards wide, and in very dry weather (during a dry summer, or in the depth of a dry winter) it can become a trickle between stagnant pools of water.

=== Steamboat landing ===
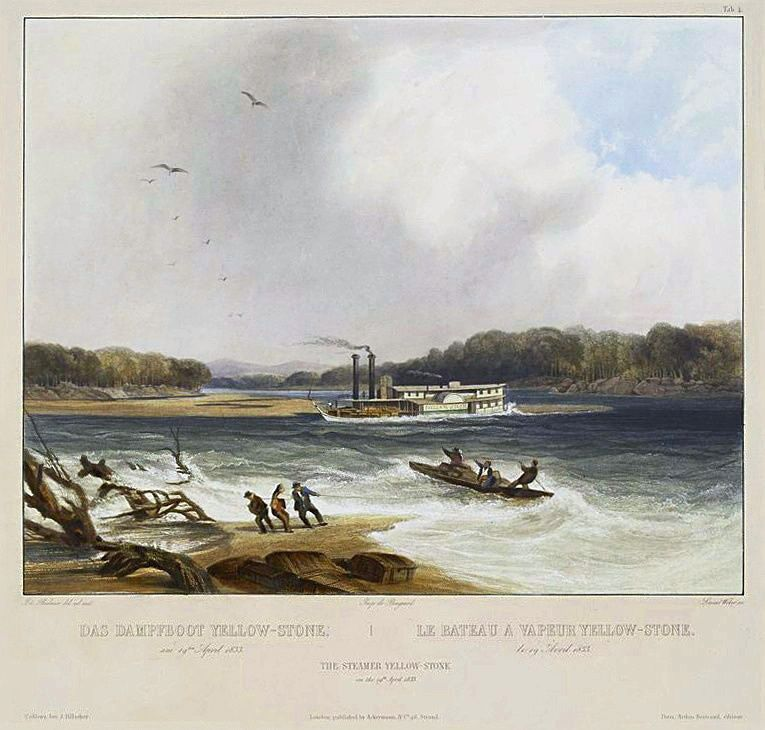
Missouri River side-wheel Steamboat Yellowstone struggling over sand bar 1833--print based on a painting by Karl Bodmer

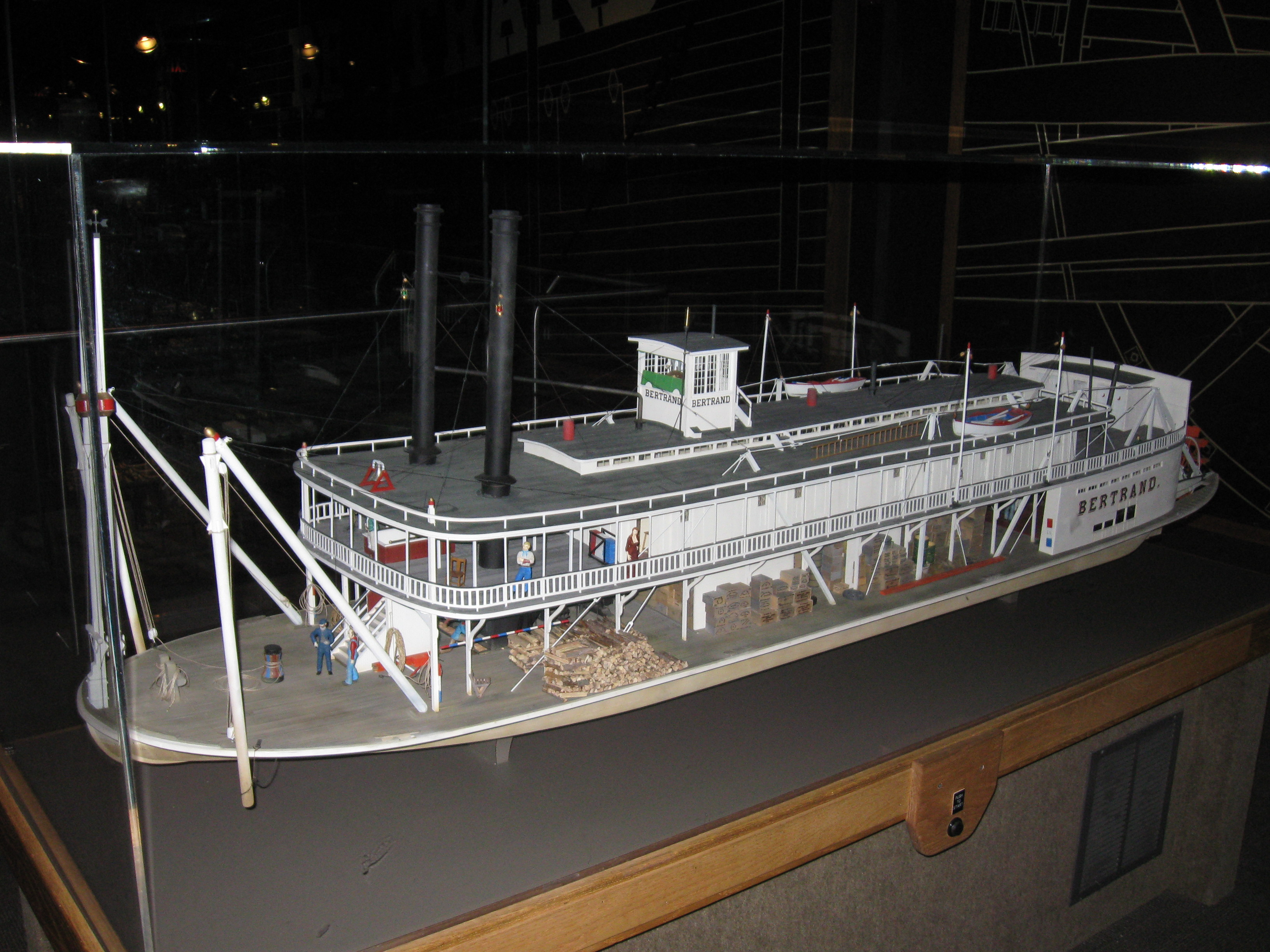
Model of Upper Missouri River stern-wheel steamboat Bertrand, which sank on April 1, 1865, after hitting a snag in DeSoto Bend while heading upriver for Fort Benton, Montana Territory

The mouth of Cow Creek became a steamboat landing, known as Cow Island landing, in the later months of the summer and fall when the Missouri river level dropped to a level so that steamboats could not get through a series of rapids above Cow Island, which are Bird Rapids, Cabin Rapids, Dauphine Rapids, and Deadman Rapids. Being some 126 river miles short of Ft. Benton, steamboats had to offload their cargo at the Cow Island landing for it to be freighted the rest of the way up the Cow Island trail.

Once gold was discovered in the Montana Territory in 1862, the Missouri River became the most reliable pathway to bring passengers and freight—particularly heavy or bulky freight—to the booming gold fields. In the era from 1860 the mid-1880s steamboats brought supplies and heavy equipment some 2,600 miles (4,200 km) from ports like St. Louis in "the states" to the upriver terminus port of Ft. Benton in the Montana Territory.

The final 1,300 miles (2,100 km) of the river was called the "upper Missouri" – this stretch traversed remote unsettled plains, and the last few hundred miles to Ft. Benton passed through the Missouri Breaks. In May and June the Missouri River has "high water" from mountain snow melt, and steamboats who caught this flood could travel all the way through the breaks to reach the upriver terminus at Ft. Benton. Later, in the summer and fall the water levels dropped, and there was "low water" on the upper Missouri. When "low water" came, deeper draft steamboats often could not reach Ft. Benton, and they had to drop their cargos downstream in the Missouri Breaks.

Each year during the steamboat era, in the late summer and fall, if there wasn't a full three feet of water depth in the channel, Cow Island and the mouth of Cow Creek became a river port, known as Cow Island landing. The mouth of Cow Creek is 126 river miles below Ft. Benton. Some 24 miles above Cow Island was Dauphine Rapids, which was the worst of the rapids. It was difficult to run even in high water, but was a deadly barrier to riverboats in low water. If a steamboat could get through Dauphine Rapids, they then faced Deadman Rapids, some 18 miles further up the river. In the stretch of river below Deadman and Dauphine Rapids, Cow Island landing was the best place from which freight could be offloaded and then transported overland to Ft. Benton, via the Cow Island Trail.

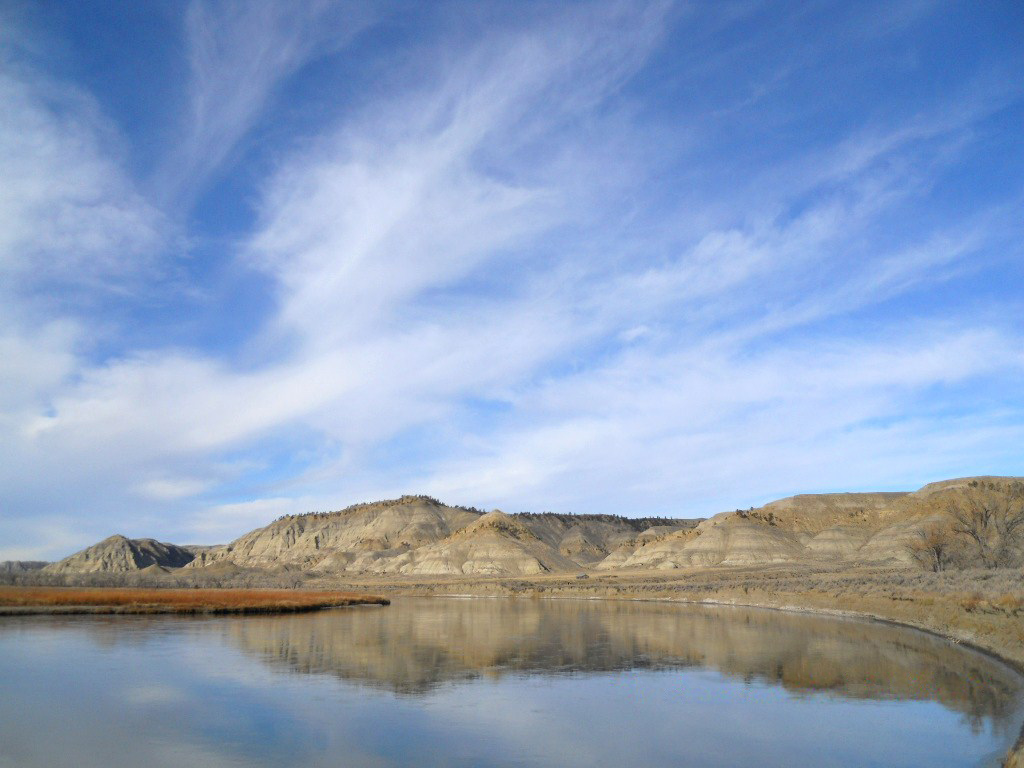
View of the Cow Island Landing (upstream location) where freight was dropped off by steamboats

To offload cargo at Cow island, the steamboats used a landing point several hundred yards above Cow Creek, in front of the now abandoned buildings of the Kipp homestead (see photo), or down river, several hundreds of yards below Cow Creek. The steamboats used landing sites where the water of the Missouri was deep up against the north bank, so the river boats could pull in close to the bank to discharge cargo.

=== Cow Island Trail ===
The wagon road that started at Cow Island Landing and went up Cow Creek, then out onto broad grassy plains and on to Ft. Benton, was called the Cow Island Trail.

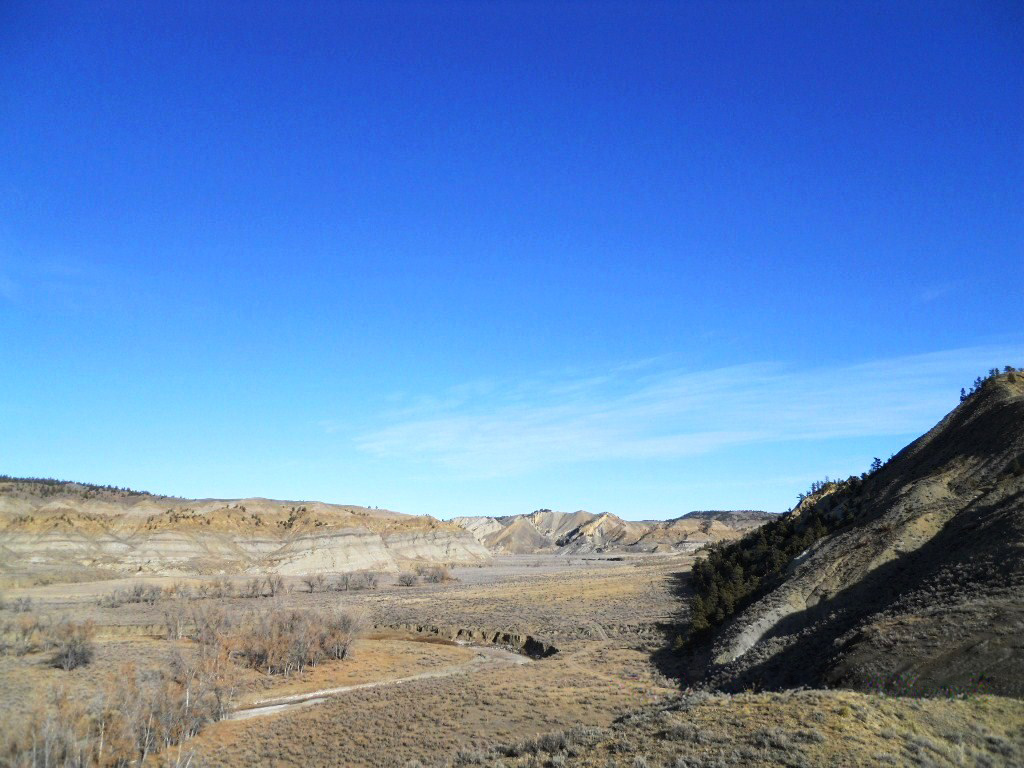
Valley bottom of Cow Creek, demonstrating relatively easy grade up through breaks. Remnant of Cow Island Trail visible lower right

This road up Cow Creek traversed the only possible team-and-wagon route in this part of the rough badlands known as the Missouri Breaks. At 35 miles long, Cow Creek is one of the longer Missouri tributaries in the breaks. It extends north to the Bearpaw Mountains where it receives seasonal spring snow melt. Over many millenniums, this greater seasonal discharge eroded and widened the creek bottom so it became flat enough for a team and wagon to traverse. From the steamboat landing on the Missouri, the trail went north up the Cow Creek bottom for 15 miles (24 km) to Davidson Coulee, at which time the trail turned west and climbed up a long steep grade on Davidson Ridge to reach the plains north of the Missouri River Breaks.

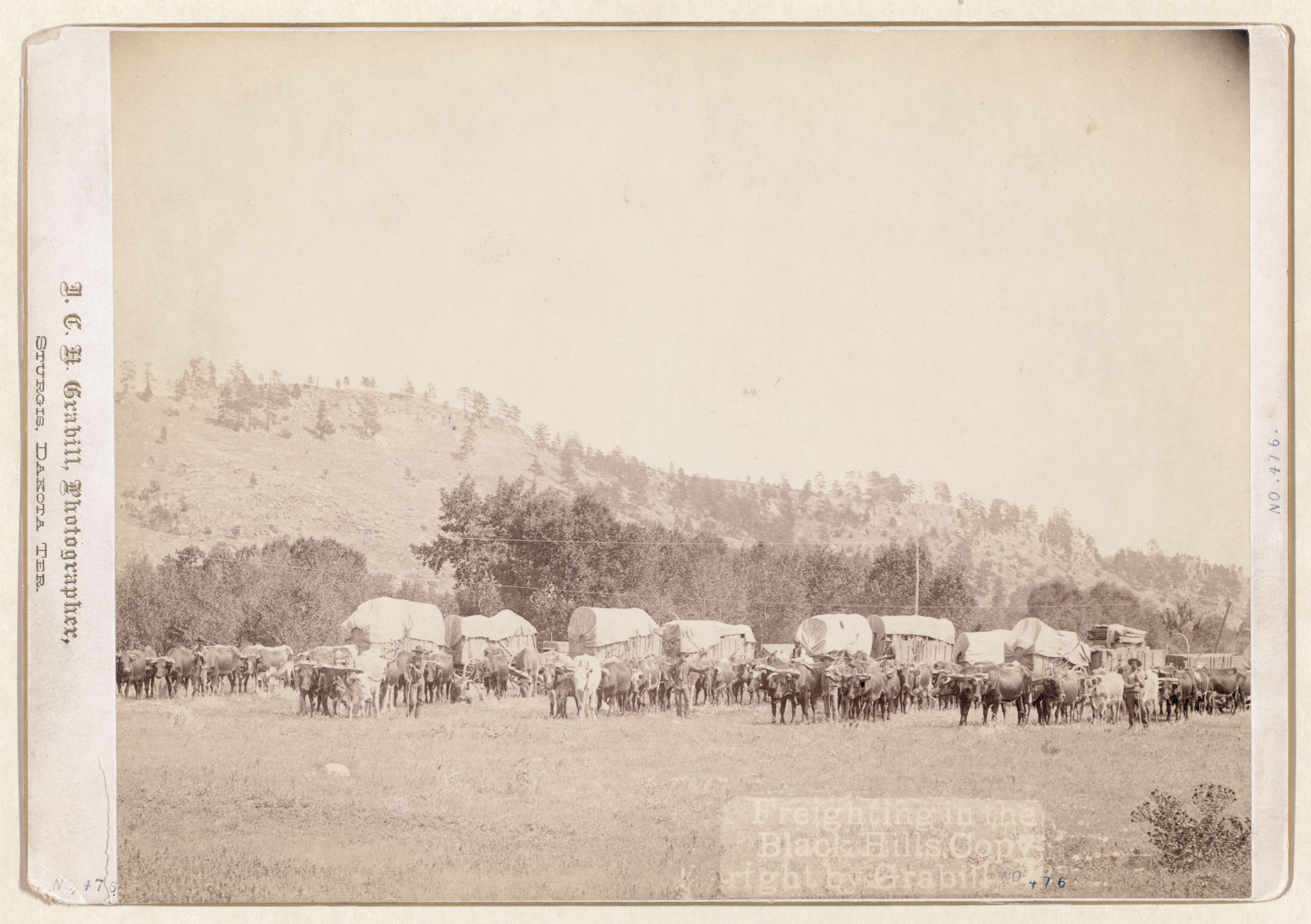
Freight wagons pulled by spans of oxen similar to those that hauled freight up the Cow Creek Trail to Fort Benton

From year to year, and month to month the volume of freight on the Cow Island Trail fluctuated depending on whether the riverboats had high water so they could get up river to Fort Benton, or whether low water over the Dauphine and other rapids caused riverboats to offload at Cow Island Landing. Starting in 1863 the Cow Island Trail had high volumes of freight traffic. 1863 was a low water year, and word was spreading that there were rich strikes in Montana Territory gold fields. In 1866 there was good water till July, so freight volume declined. 1868 was a different story. By year end, 2,500 men, 3,000 teams and 20,000 oxen ere involved in freighting on the Cow Island Trail to Ft. Benton.

No permanent storehouses were erected at Cow Island. Once freight was offloaded at Cow Island, it was tarped and remained only briefly before being moved to Ft. Benton. The high profits on freight could only be realized once the goods had gotten to Ft. Benton. A common outfit on the trail was 2 wagons, each pulled by six to eight oxen, with two bullwhackers. Oxen were preferred over horses and mules because they required less food and water, did not wander during storms, and "Indians didn't steal them because they couldn't ride them and they were to tough to eat".

The Cow Creek Trail was far from ideal, and carrying freight to Fr. Benton was never an easy task. In the confines of Cow Creek's narrow but relatively flat creek bottom, the creek meanders from one steep coulee sidewall to the other. While traveling the 15 miles up Cow Creek the heavy freight wagons had to ford Cow Creek 31 times. The fords would wash out if the area had a heavy rain. In wetter weather heavy wagons could bog down at a creek crossing. After going 15 miles up the creek bottom, the freighters encountered long steep grades. The freighters had to stop, unhitch and "double team" or even "triple team" each of the wagons. In 1864 while ascending a steep grade on the trail, a wagon ran its outside wheels off the trail and went over, dragging the ox team with it. The descent of 300 feet killed the oxen, badly damaged the wagon and scattered its contents.

=== Nez Perce War ===
On September 23, 1877, several hundred Nez Perce crossed the Missouri at Cow Creek in their flight toward Canada. An army garrison of twelve men under Sergeant William Molchert was at Cow Island Landing, along with four civilian clerks who represented freighting interests in the region.

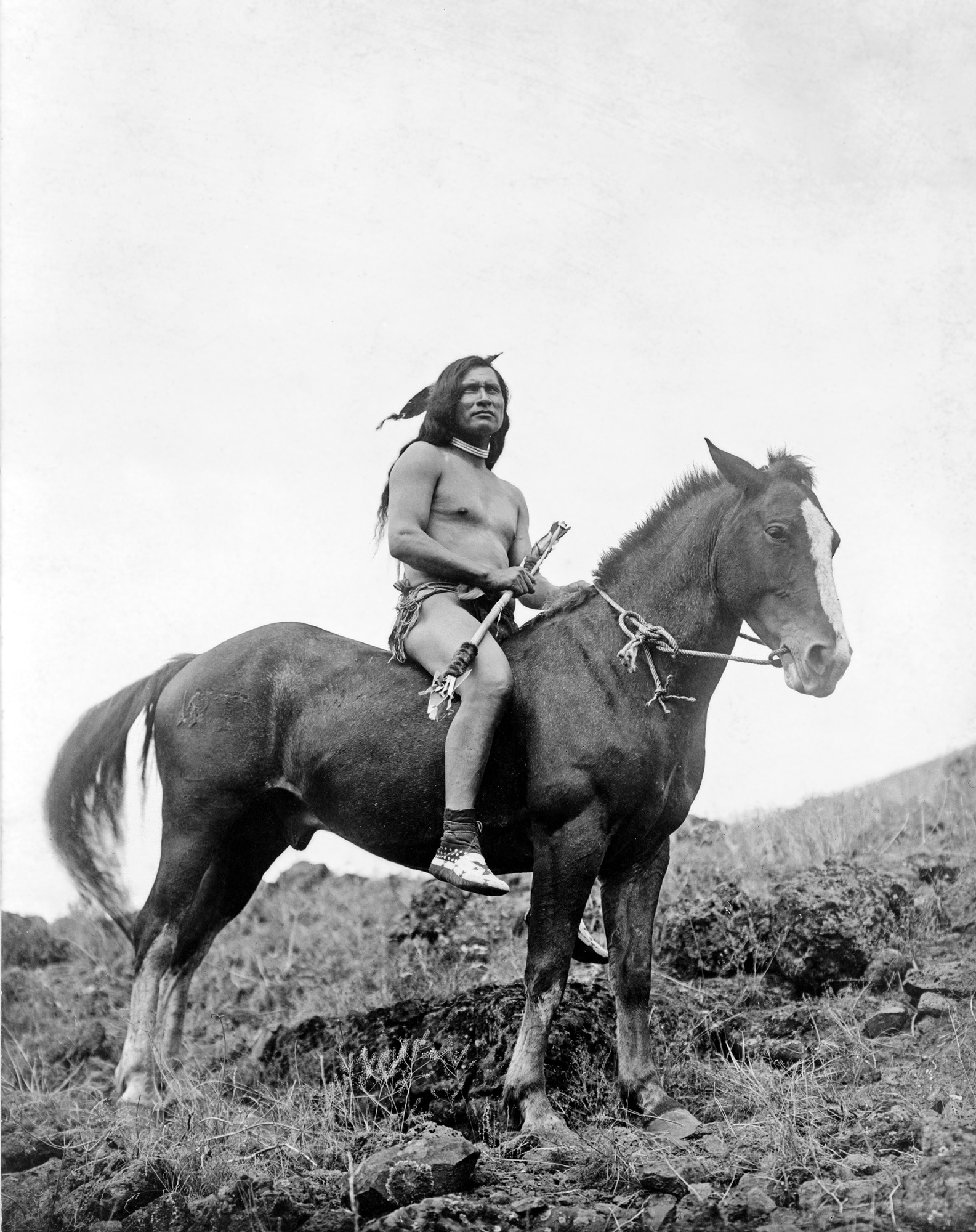
Nez Perce Warrior

Fifty tons of freight, which had been offloaded from steamboats, lay under tarpaulins at the landing awaiting shipment by wagon to Fort Benton or other remote corners of the Montana Territory.

The Nez Perce crossed the Missouri at several places. The group observed by soldiers first sent an advance guard of 20 or so warriors across, who spread out on the north bank. Then the women and children crossed with pack animals and camp equipment, and finally a rear guard of warriors crossed.

Several armed encounters involving the Nez Perce occurred on Cow Creek, but the most important event was the fateful decision made while in camp on Cow Creek on September 25, 1877.

The squad of soldiers at Cow Island Landing on September 23, 1877, had been sent to guard the stockpiled supplies, which had been offloaded from steamboats. Upon the arrival of the Nez Perce, the soldiers and the clerks retreated into an earthen entrenchment which had been built around their tents to divert rain water. The entrenchment was a few hundred yards from the ford. Significantly the entrenchment was also a few hundred yards from the stacked supplies.

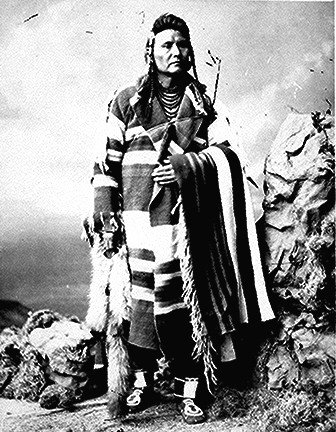
Chief Joseph, Nez Perce

After crossing the river, the main body of the Nez Perce went past the soldiers without incident, and camped about two miles up Cow Creek. A small group of Nez Perce rode to the entrenchment. They indicated friendly intentions and asked for some of the stockpiled food. The army sergeant in charge at first ignored their request which reduced the Nez Perce to begging. Finally the sergeant gave them one bag of hardtack and one side of bacon from the soldier's own stores. At sundown gunfire broke from Indians in the breaks, who had located themselves so they could fire down into the entrenchment. Two civilians were wounded and the soldiers, though able to return fire, were now pinned down. The supplies were far enough from the entrenchment so that, as night fell, the Indians could filter out of the steep eroded breaks and get to the supplies without coming under effective fire. After dark the Indians broke into the supplies, and took what they found desirable in the dark. The supplies were set on fire. A large stockpile of bacon burned brightly for most of the night. The soldiers attributed the illumination from this blaze with preventing a concerted attack, but it is more likely that the Nez Perce only wanted the supplies and not a pitched battle with the soldiers. The Indians and the soldiers exchanged sporadic gunfire through the night until about 10:00 in the morning, after which the Nez Perce moved off up Cow Creek. Two civilians and one Nez Perce warrior were wounded.

On September 22, 1877, before the arrival of the Nez Perce, a wagon train had left Cow Island Landing with 35 tons of freight and a herd of cattle, heading up Cow Island Trail for Ft. Benton. On September 24 while still in Cow Island Canyon, the train was overtaken by the Nez Perce who approached them unthreateningly and camped one and one half miles away. That evening some Nez Perce visited the camp of the wagon train and there were civil exchanges between the members of the wagon train and the Nez Perce who wanted to trade for ammunition and other goods.

On the morning of September 25, a small army relief force under Major Guido Igles approached the rear of the Nez Perce assemblage on Cow Creek. Major Igles had come from Ft. Benton to the aid of the outpost at Cow Island Landing. He was leading a handful of soldiers and civilian volunteers from Ft. Benton. After reaching Cow Island on September 24, he had continued on the trail of the Nez Perce.

When the Nez Perce discovered Major Igles coming up Cow Creek, some warriors went down the canyon to take up positions to meet this threat. Other Nez Perce attacked the wagon train. One teamster was killed and the others fled into willows along the creek or into the breaks. The main body of the Nez Perce helped themselves to some goods in the wagons, set them on fire, and continued on up Cow Creek.

Meanwhile, the Nez Perce warriors forming the rear guard had taken up positions on heights facing Major Igles small force which was down in Cow Creek canyon. Firing broke out. The Nez Perce were in a position to fire into Igles position. One civilian was killed. Another was saved when a bullet was deflected by his belt buckle, bruising his abdomen. After two hours, the Nez Perce broke off the engagement. Fearing an ambush and knowing he was greatly outnumbered, Major Igles began a slow and cautious withdrawal to Cow Island Landing. He reported two Nez Perce wounded in the encounter.

On the night of September 25 the steamer Benton arrived at Cow Island Landing, discharging fifty tons of freight, and the steamer Silver City approached with an additional one hundred tons. Major Igles sent couriers reporting the Nez Perce location to General Miles who was advancing cross country from Ft. Keogh with fresh troops to intercept the Nez Perce.

When the Nez Perce started up Cow Creek, they were only 80 miles (130 km) from Canada. While camped on Cow Creek on the evening of September 25 following the skirmish with Major Igles dissention broke out among the Nez Perce leadership between those who wanted to press on and those who wanted to slow to rest tired and weakened people and horses. The Nez Perce believed the soldiers were now far behind them. They were unaware that General Miles was coming cross country from Ft. Keogh as fast as his troops could travel. Those who wanted to go slower won out. Because the Nez Perce paused instead of pressing ahead, on September 30, General Miles' column caught up with the Nez Perce who were camped on Snake Creek east of the Bear Paw Mountains, just 40 miles (64 km) from Canada. Miles immediately attacked. On October 5, 1877, after six days of fighting, and with Nez Perce men, women and children suffering and dying from wounds and exposure to freezing weather, Chief Joseph surrendered the Nez Perce to the U.S. Army commanders.

The capture of the Nez Perce occurred because they delayed in crossing the Canada–US border, allowing General Miles to catch up to them with a fresh force of soldiers, who were superior in number and firepower. The events, "battles" and skirmishes on Cow Creek added to the overall delay, allowing General Miles to close the gap. However the deciding factor that determined the fate of the Nez Perce was the fateful decision made during the tribal council on the evening of September 25, 1877 while in camp along Cow Creek.

=== Homesteading ===
Where small creeks or streams emerge from the breaks to meet the Missouri, there are broad riverside "bottoms" with meadows and cottonwoods. Cow Creek opens to such a bottom at its junction with the Missouri, and further downstream Bull Creek opens up another bottom as it flows into the Missouri.

Just upstream from the mouth of Cow Creek, the Kipp homestead lies in Cow Creek bottom. It is adjacent to the site of the old upper steamboat landing, above the mouth of Cow Creek. One source reports that the Kipp homestead was originally filed by the historic figure James Kipp (1788–1880) and was lived in by his son, Joseph and then his grandson, James Kipp, but that this Kipp homestead and the homestead downriver on Bull Creek became the property of the Jones family, related by marriage to the Kipp family. Another source indicates the homestead was claimed by Jim Kipp in 1913. Jim was the son of Joseph Kipp (1849–1913) who was the son of the historic figure James Kipp (1788–1880) and his wife Earth Woman.

The elder historic James Kipp (1788–1880) helped establish Ft. Union at the mouth of the Yellowstone in 1828 and he also founded Ft. Piegan at the mouth of the Marias River in 1831. The Kipp homestead is abandoned but a few cabins and outbuildings remain standing at the homestead site.

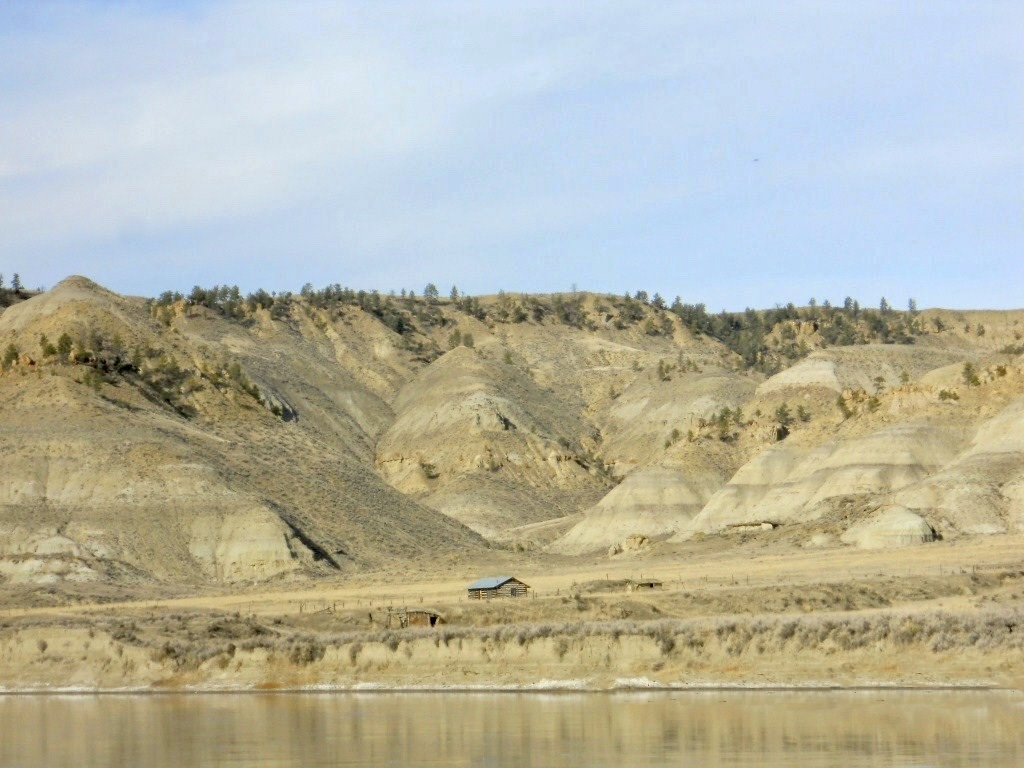
Looking up river to the Kipp Homestead.

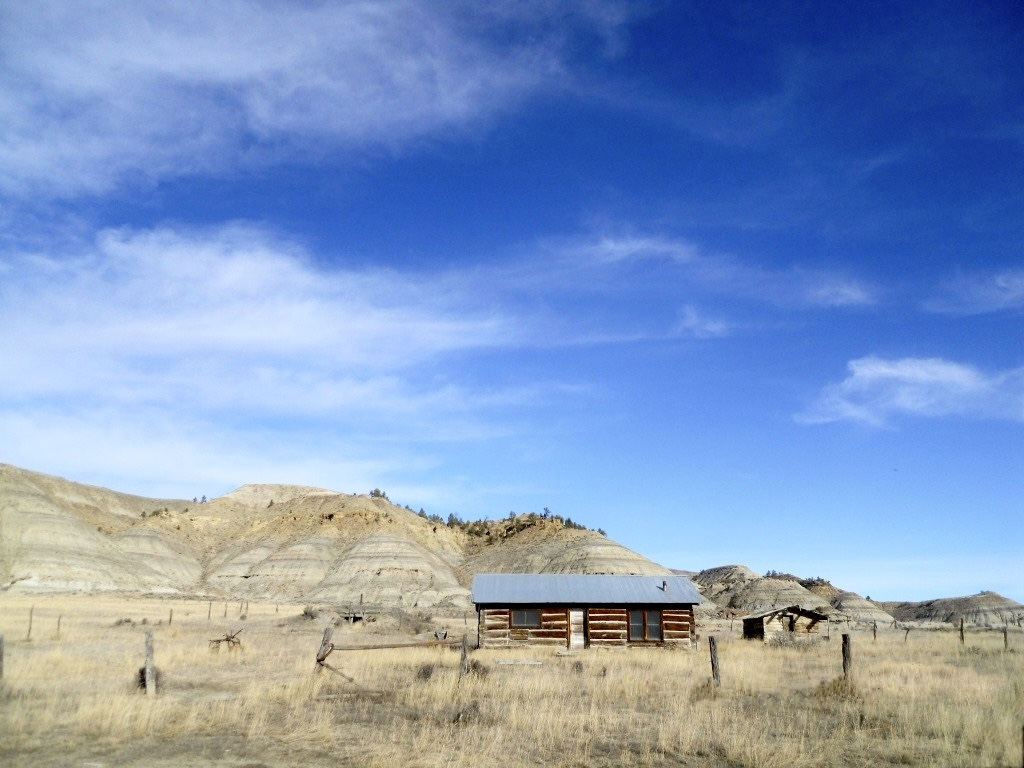
Kipp homestead buildings – newer cabin in center, original cabin on right, dugout on left.

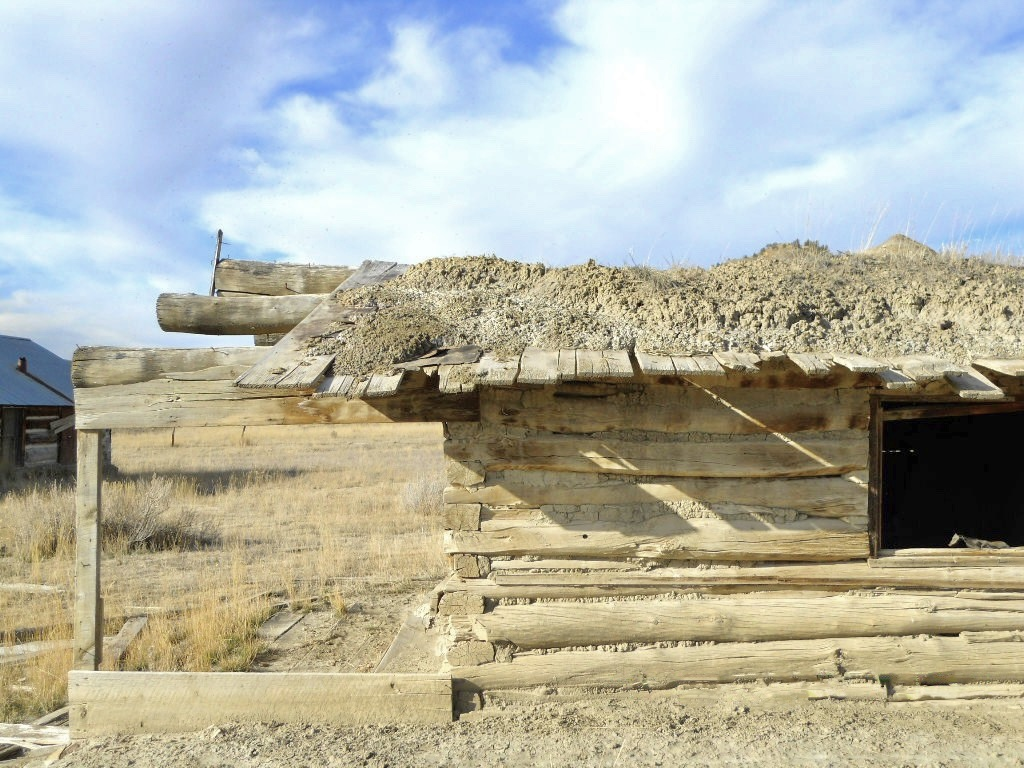
Kipp homestead – detail of original cabin. Note mud chinking and earth roof.

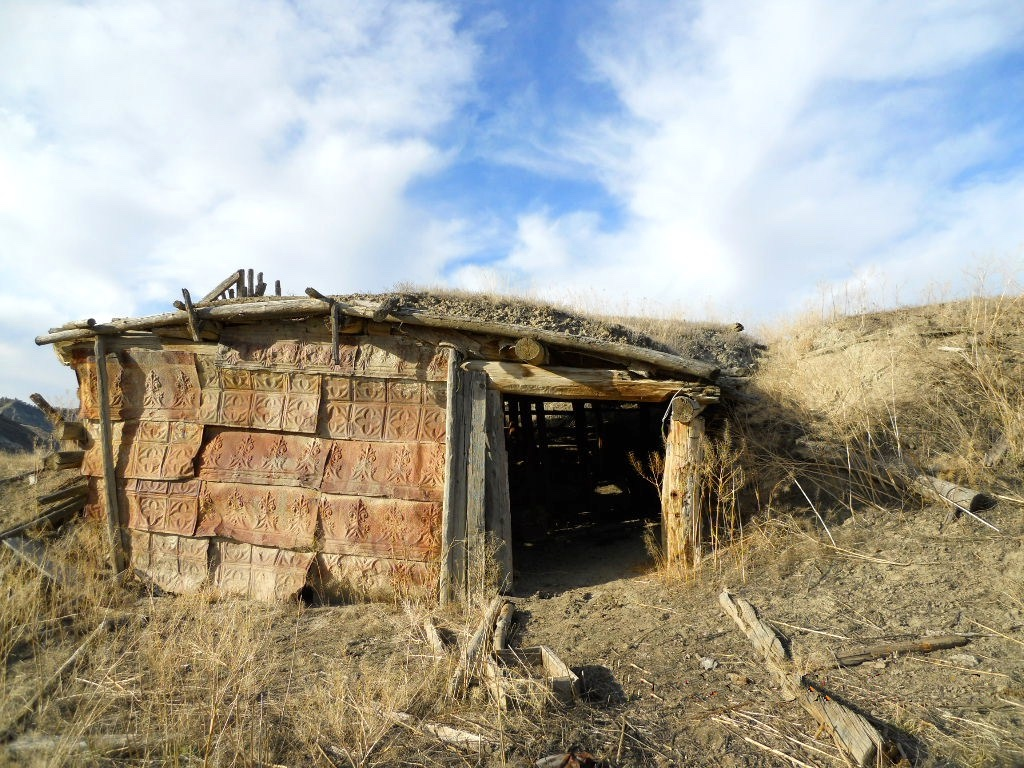
Kipp homestead – stable, dugout of bank going down to river from cabins.

Just downstream from the mouth of Cow Creek is the mouth of Bull Creek. Here on Bull Creek bottom is another abandoned homestead with decaying and collapsing log buildings, and the debris from failed farming efforts. This homestead is attributed to the Jones family, related by marriage to the Kipp family.

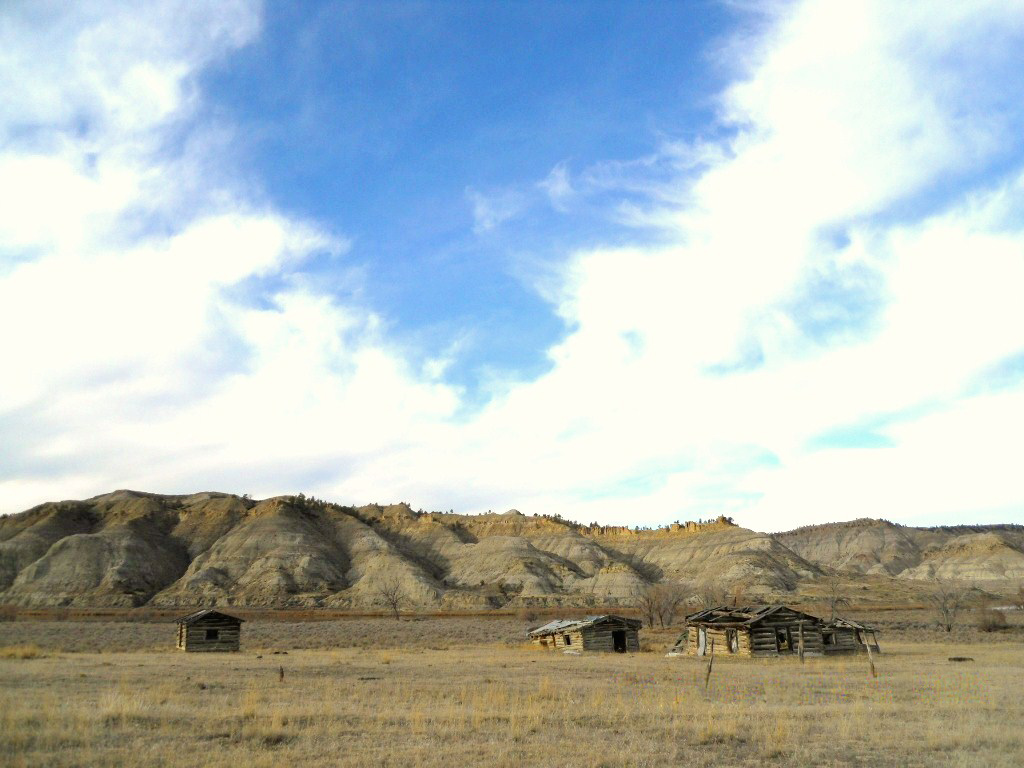
Three Homestead Buildings, Bull Creek Bottoms, Missouri River Breaks, Montana

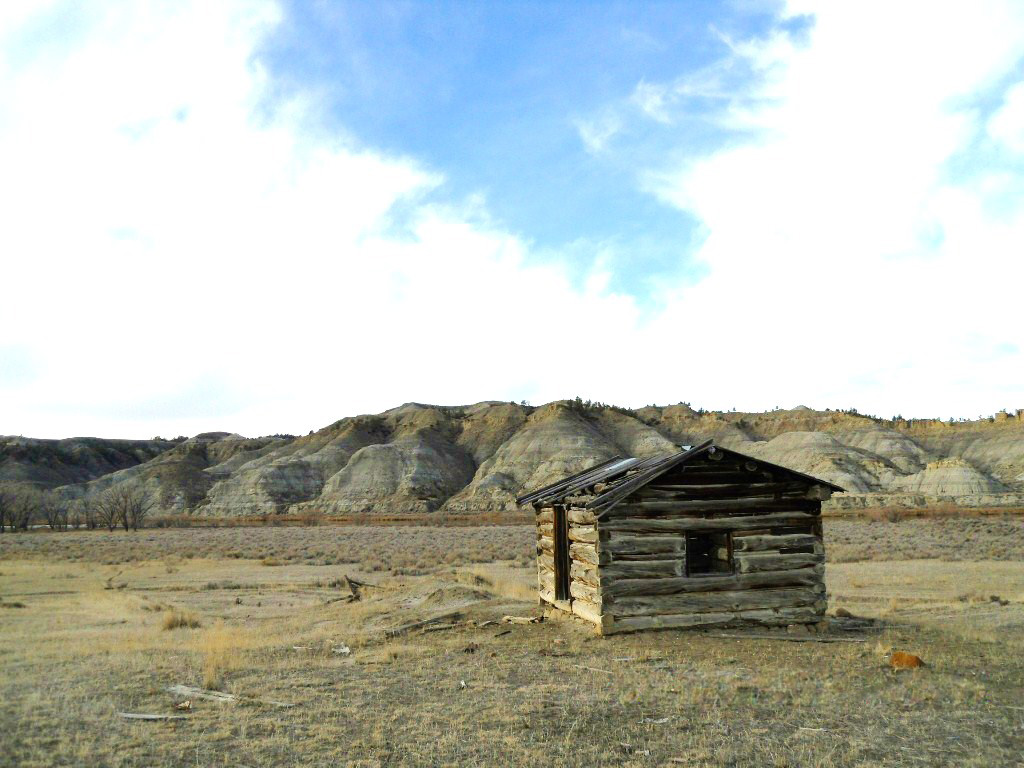
First Homestead Building, Bull Creek Bottoms, Missouri River Breaks, Montana

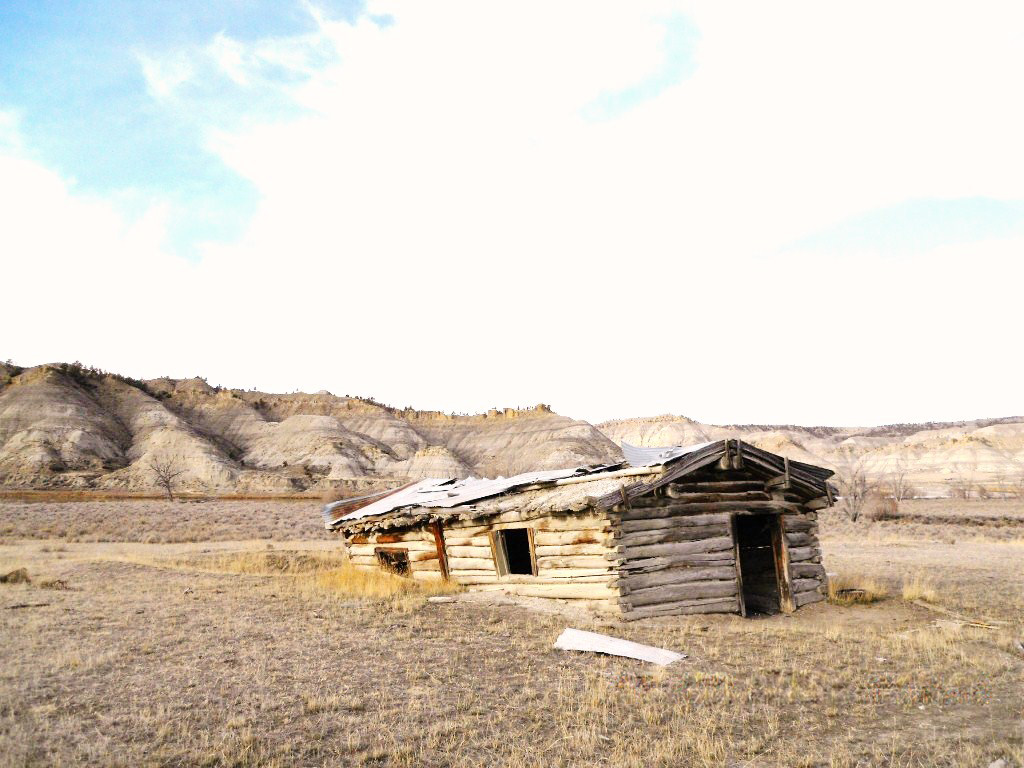
Second Homestead Building, Bull Creek Bottoms, Missouri River Breaks, Montana

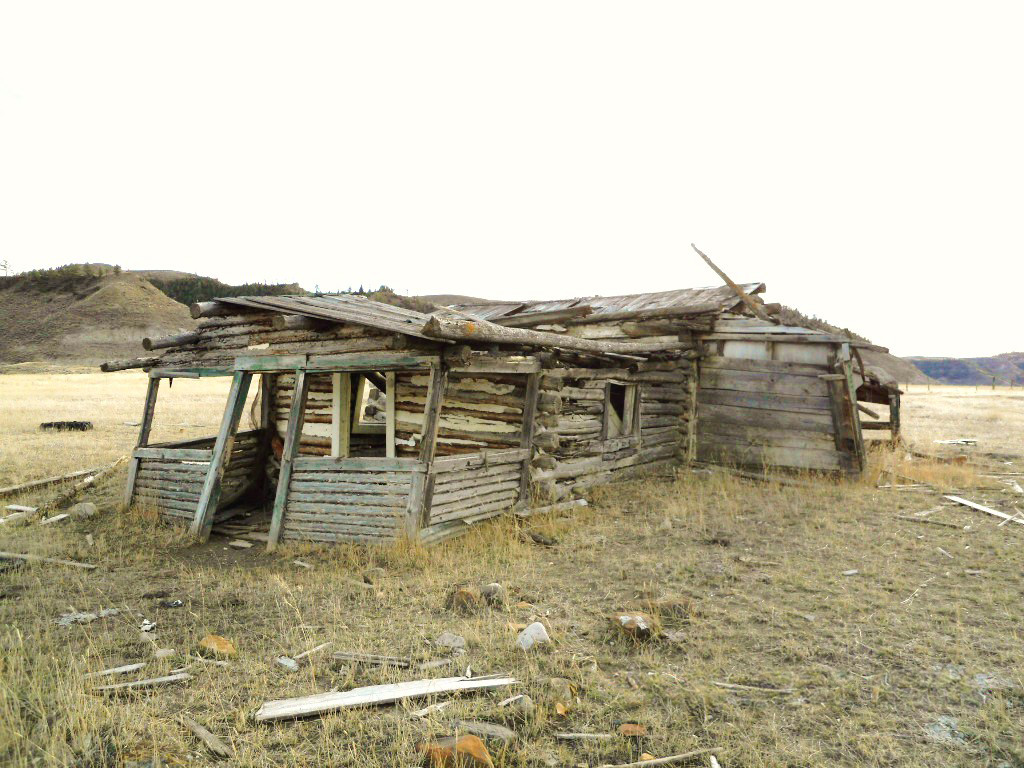
Third Homestead Building, Bull Creek Bottoms, Missouri River Breaks, Montana

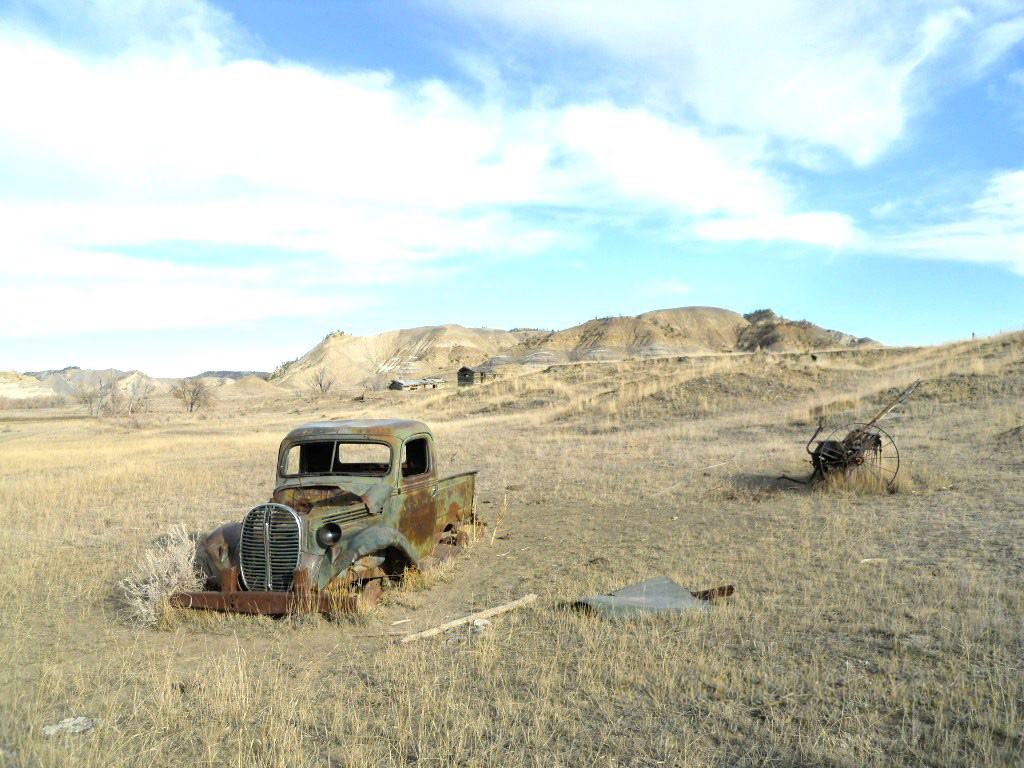
Abandoned truck and farm equipment, Homestead on Bull Creek Bottoms, Montana

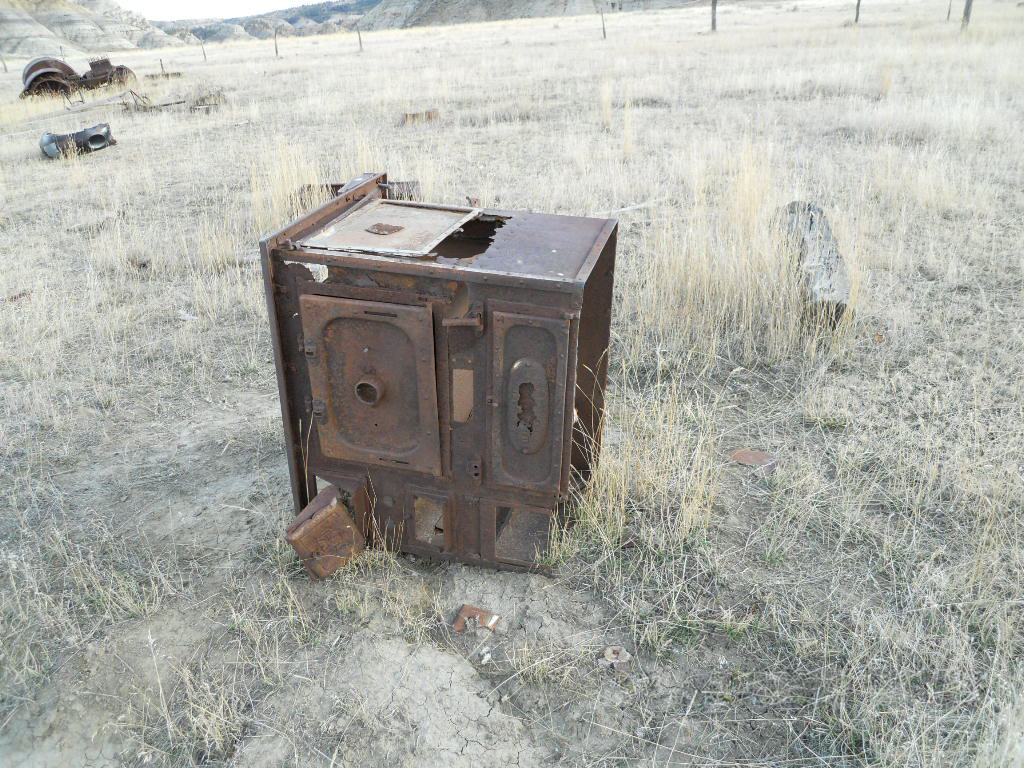
Stove, Homestead on Bull Creek Bottoms, Montana

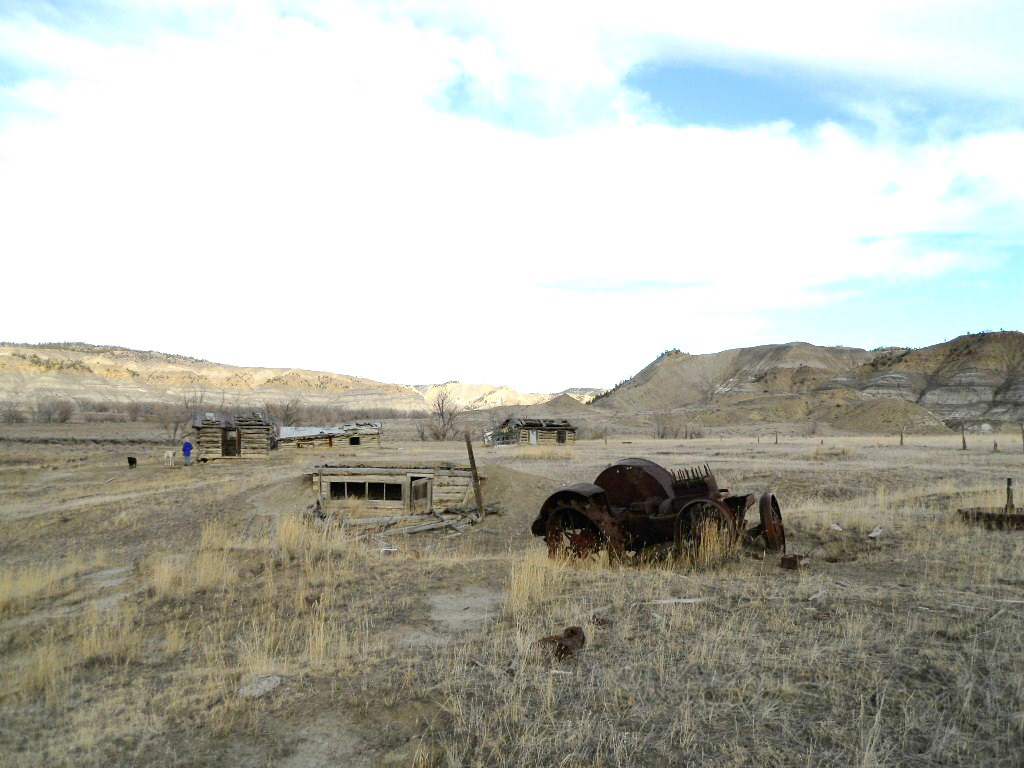
Homestead, Bull Creek Bottom, Chickenhouse dugout and what's left of the old tractor

Road access to both homesteads was along a primitive road that traveled downstream along the Missouri on the north side of the river to the site of a power plant. This road was still passable from the power plant site to Cow Creek a few years ago. During the homesteading years, one of the few ferries in the Missouri breaks operated at the site of the power plant. From the power plant ferry a road went north to the Zortman area, and another road went south toward Lewistown, Montana.

=== Today ===
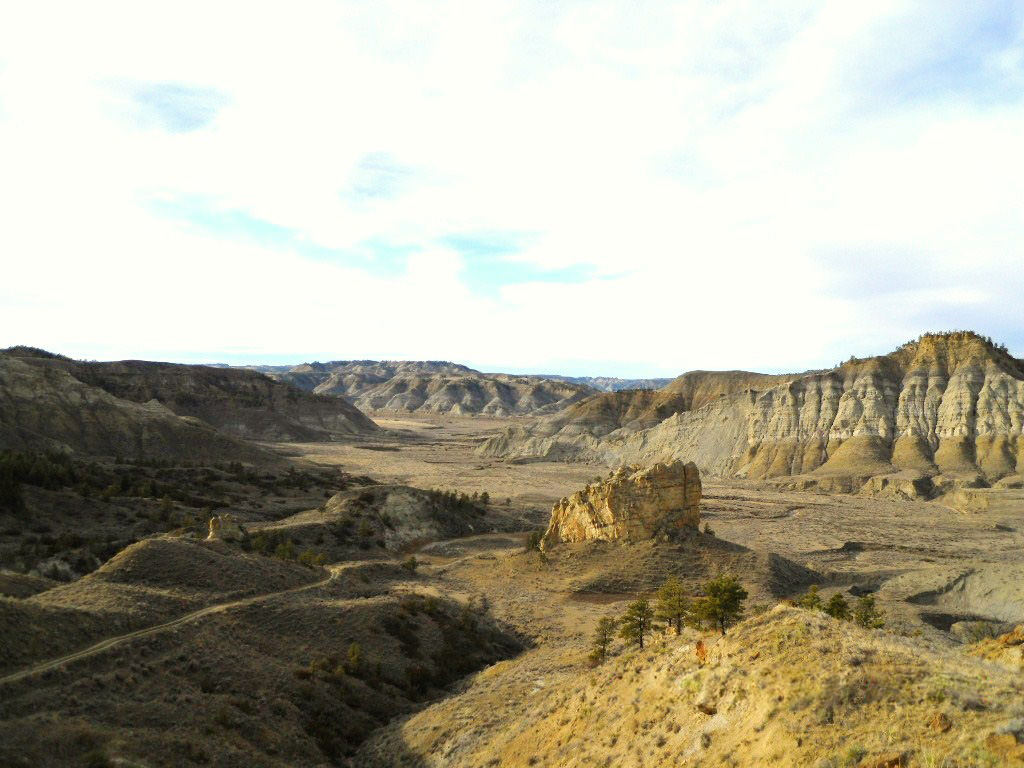
Missouri River Breaks, Montana - Isolated Butte in Bull Creek, and Road down to Cow Creek and Bull Creek

Once an ancient and much used highway for migrating animals and nomadic natives, Cow Creek and the Cow Island Crossing has been reduced to dormant inactivity by the passage of time. The migrating herds of buffalo were hunted to near extinction. The nomadic Native Americans were all placed on reservations, all long removed from Cow Creek. Railroads put an end to the Missouri River steamboat. The Missouri Breaks homesteader went broke or just got discouraged and left. Highway projects through the breaks chose more conveniently located routes than Cow Island or Cow Creek. A few ranches remain along the 35 mile extent of Cow Creek, and these are in the upper portion of the creek, in or near the foothills of the Bear Paw Mountains.

Cow Creek is now one of the more remote and uninhabited spots in an area – the Missouri Breaks – notorious for its isolation. This condition is recognized by the United States Bureau of Land Management (BLM), which is currently considering the lower portion of Cow Creek for wilderness status.

The abandoned buildings of the Kipp homestead on Cow Creek bottom and the homestead on Bull bottom continue to deteriorate. For many years a snubbing post, used to tie up steamboats, was buried in the river bank between the Kipp homestead and the river. The snubbing post may have since washed into the river. It is reported that the remains of the entrenchments are still visible that used by the soldiers in the 1877 skirmish with the Nez Perce that is now known as the "Battle of Cow Island". For many years the metal wreckage from wagons burned by the Nez Perce on September 25, 1877, could be seen in Cow Creek canyon.

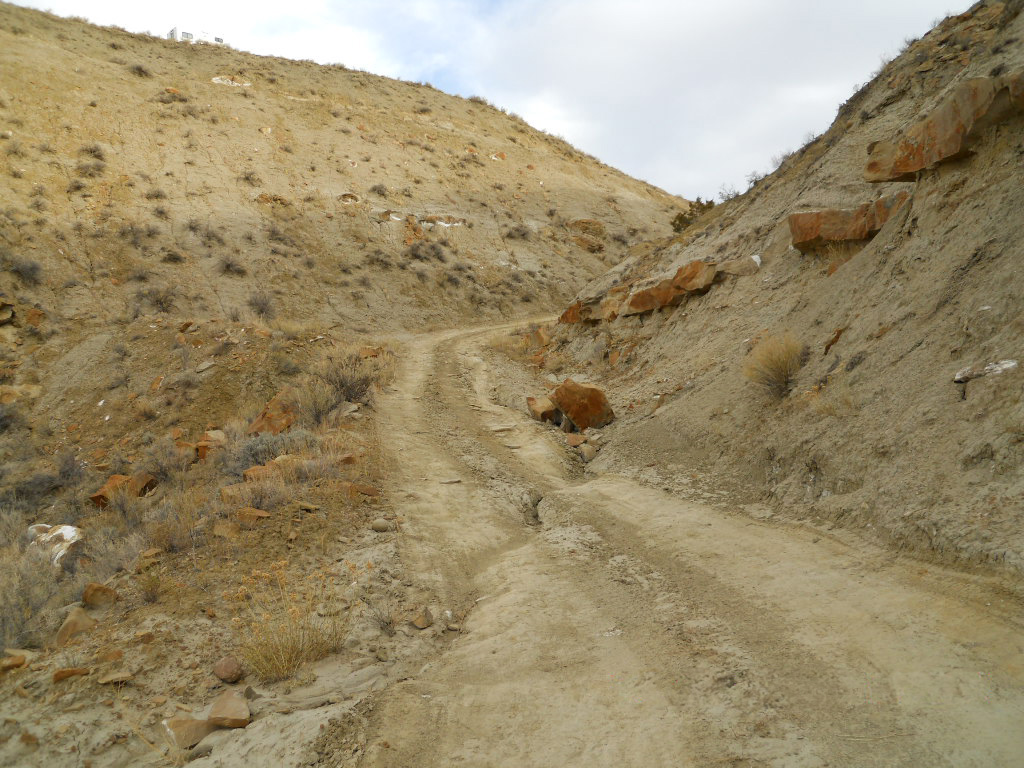
A washout developing across Missouri Breaks road to Cow Creek

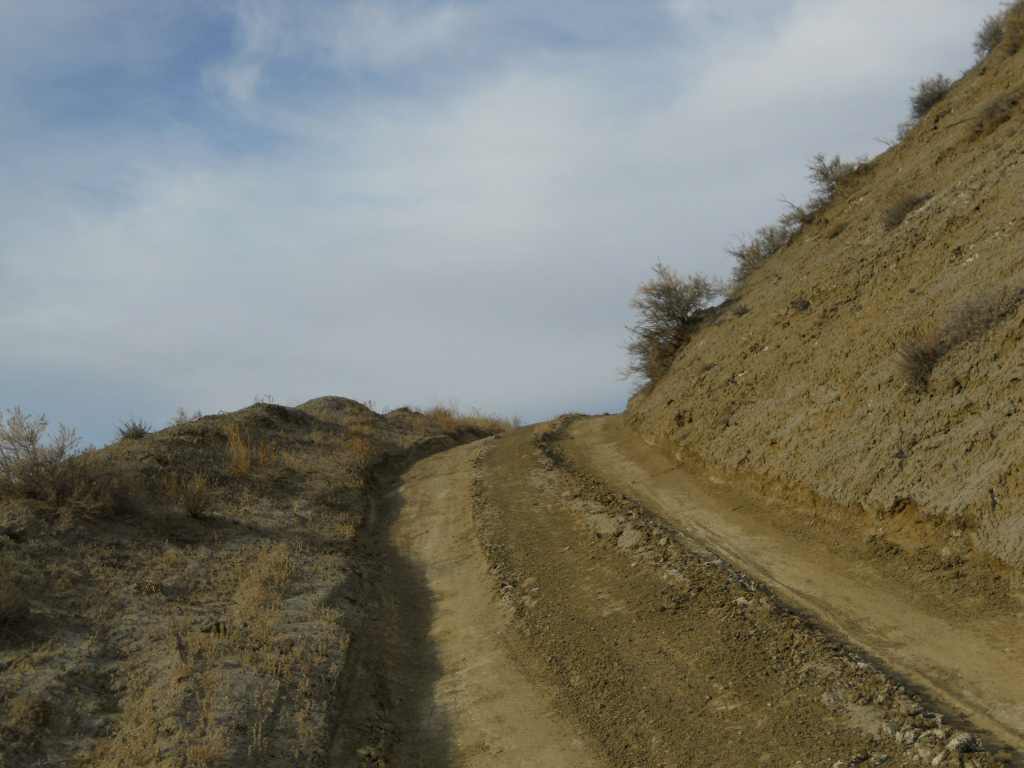
Dirt road tilts outward toward drop off

An unsupported (and very likely apocryphal) local rumor developed that the wagon train had been carrying gold and it was taken by the Nez Perce and buried in the vicinity.

Lower Cow Creek, where the deserted homesteads are located, is difficult to visit. A mostly dirt surfaced BLM road runs west from Montana Highway 66 for 14 miles (23 km), before dropping down into Bull Creek. Bull Creek joins the Missouri very near Cow Island, and from Bull Creek one can get to the adjacent mouth of Cow Creek. In the descent from the high ridges of the breaks into the Missouri bottom at Bull Creek, this road has steep rutted inclines and several switchbacks. The road is often cut into the side of steep cliffs. This stretch is sharply eroded with washouts, and there are precious few places to turn around, if the traveler decides he has had enough.

As for the old freight trail that went upstream from the mouth of Cow Creek, there is no longer any road to speak of in the first 15 miles. The multiple creek crossings of the old Cow Creek trail have been eroded away into cut banks, and the gravel bars where the wagons crossed have been swept down stream. Here and there the remnants of the old Cow Creek Trail can be observed along Cow Creek but it is sketchy. Upper Cow Creek is not so isolated. About 15 miles up from the Missouri, where Davidson Coulee flows into Cow Creek, Blaine County Road 330 (Cow Creek Trail) drops down Davidson ridge to Cow Creek Bottom from the west. One ranch is located near this point. The name "Cow Island Trail" is still applied to the road that goes from the junction of Cow Creek and Davidson Coulee up to the bench and on to the west, and this is probably the same route that the original Cow Island freight trail followed as it went on to Ft. Benton. Above Davidson Coulee Cow Creek is paralleled by Blain County Road 314 (Birdtail Road) for about 6 miles (10 km). In the upper reaches of Cow Creek a County road (Birdtail Road) descends to a second ranch. Blaine County Road 300 crosses Cow Creek at it upper end, near the forks of West and East Cow Creek, just under the southern flank of the Bears Paw Mountains.

Most of the roads in the breaks are simply dirt roads. Only a few are graveled. Dirt roads in the Cow Creek area (as well as most of the Missouri Breaks) can be traversed only with extreme difficulty (if at all) when wet. The breaks are partially eroded from clays of the Cretaceous formations which contain bentonite. When wet the surface of these clays becomes slick and then becomes "gumbo" which clings to and builds up on tires, wheels, feet and hooves. If caught on dirt roads in the breaks by rain the best (and sometimes the only) course is to simply wait till the surface dries out.

== Notes ==
The journal of Lewis for May 26, 1805, states: "Our hunters had killed two of the Bighorned Animals since I had left them. we also passed another creek [Cow Creek] a few miles below Turtle Creek on the Stard. 30 yds in width which also had running water bed rocky. (we called it Windsor Cr.) late this evening we passed a very bad rapid which reached quite across the river, [NB: water deep channel narrow gravel &c. on each side] the party had considerable difficulty in ascending it although they doubled their crews and used both the rope and the pole. While they were passing this rapid a female Elk and its fawn swam down through the waves which ran very high, hence the name of Elk rapids which they instantly gave this place, these are the most considerable rapids which we have yet seen on the Missouri and in short the only place where there has appeared to be a sudden descent." Windsor Creek became known as Cow Creek. for it to be 30 yards wide, it had to be in flood from snow melt in the Bearpaws. The rapids referred as Elk rapids became known as Bird rapids, and along with Cabin rapids, Dauphine rapids, and Deadman rapids they formed a barrier to steamboat travel in low water that caused Cow Island landing at Cow Creek to become the low water landing where freight was transferred to wagon trains for the final leg to Ft. Benton.

The Cretaceous shale which make up the surface of the breaks contain Ammonite fossils. Ammonites are an extinct form of the subclass Cephalopod. Fossil Ammonites have a disc like shape. In this area they commonly range from tiny up to about 10 to 14 inches (250–360 mm) across. A Moby Dick of Ammonite fossils – one about 5 to 6 feet (1.5–1.8 m) across or larger – was identified by Shell Oil Company geologists engaged on a field survey in the Cow Creek area in the late 1950s. They did not mark the site on their maps, and never had an opportunity to return. The siting was at a remote spot on Cow creek or one of its tributaries, but in the breaks. Since it would take a crane to lift this monster, a heavy truck to haul it, and reasonably good roads to move it, this lost giant Ammonite fossil probably still awaits re-discovery on Cow Creek.

== See also ==
- Chief Joseph
- Nez Perce tribe
- Nez Perce War
- Fort Benton, Montana
- Missouri Breaks
