= Upper Missouri River Breaks National Monument =

Protected area in Montana

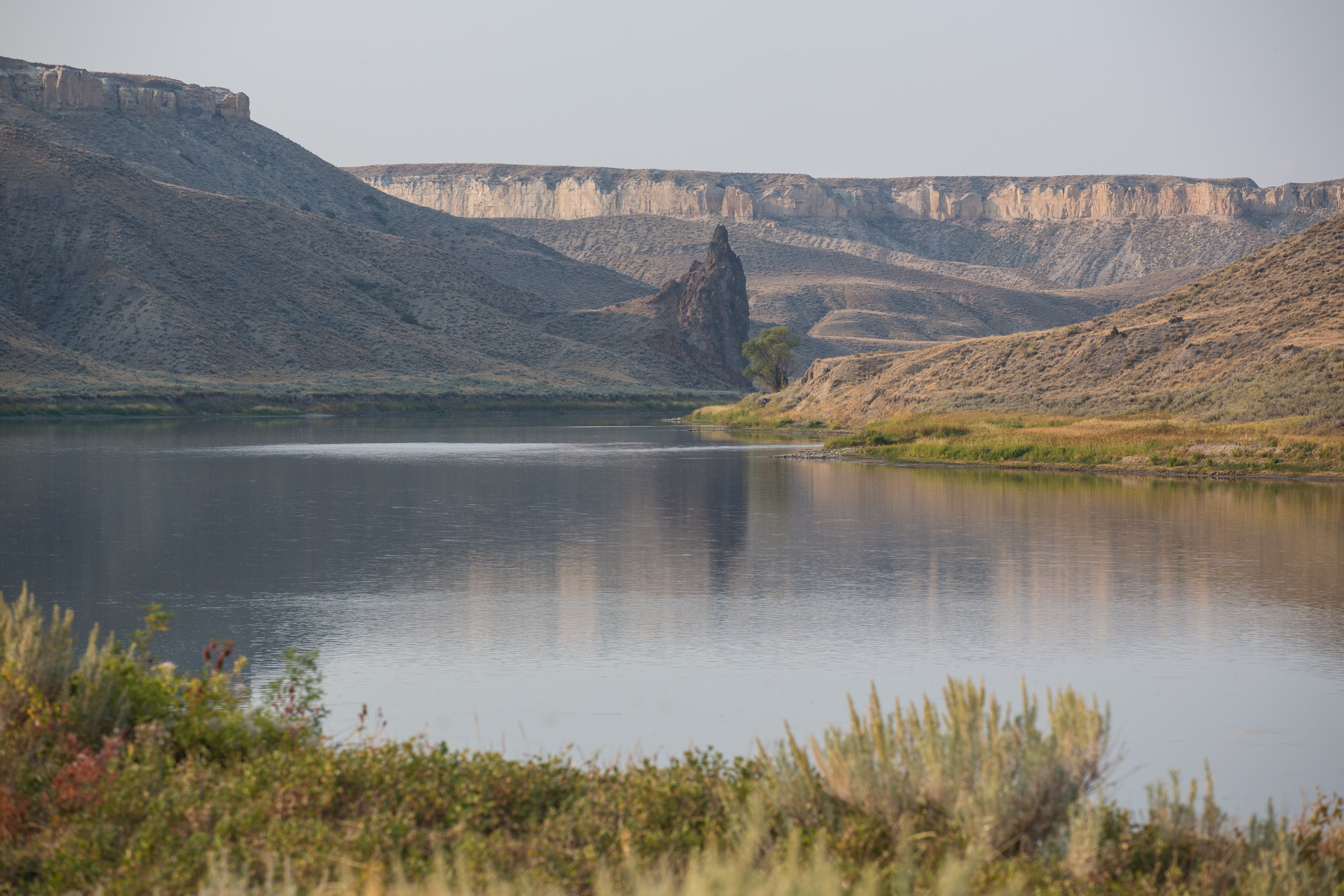
- The breaks of the Upper Missouri River National Monument

- Location within the United States Location within Montana
- Location: Chouteau, Fergus, Blaine, and Phillips counties, Montana, U.S.
- Nearest city: Great Falls
- Coordinates: 47°47′0″N 109°1′17″W
- Area: 377,000 acres (1,530 km^{2})
- Established: January 17, 2001
- Visitors: 63,512 (in 2002)
- Governing body: U.S. Bureau of Land Management
- Website: Upper Missouri River Breaks National Monument

The Upper Missouri River Breaks National Monument is a national monument in the western United States, protecting the Missouri Breaks of north central Montana. Managed by the Bureau of Land Management (BLM), it is a series of badland areas characterized by rock outcroppings, steep bluffs, and grassy plains; a topography referred to as "The Breaks" (as the land appears to "break away" to the river).

Created by proclamation in 2001 by President Bill Clinton on January 17, it encompasses 377,000 acres (589 sq mi; 1,526 km^{2}), of public lands, most of which were already managed by the federal government. The adjacent Missouri River was designated a Wild and Scenic River in 1976 and forms a western boundary while the Charles M. Russell National Wildlife Refuge is to the east. The Breaks country was a model for many of the paintings done by painter Charles M. Russell.

== History ==
French trappers found the area in the late 18th century peopled by Native American tribes such as the Blackfoot, Northern Cheyenne, Sioux, Assiniboine, Gros Ventre (Atsina), Crow, Plains Cree, and Plains Ojibwa. (The Crow name is Xuáhcheesh Annáppiio, "Where the Crow warrior Skunk was killed.")

The Lewis and Clark Expedition passed through the Breaks in 1805 and were the first to document the region through notes and drawings, and their sighting and documentation of bighorn sheep in the Breaks region was the first time this species was recorded in North America by white explorers. Much of the Breaks region has remained as it was when Lewis and Clark's party first saw it. The confluence of the Judith and Missouri Rivers was the setting for important peace councils in 1846 and 1855.

In 1877, the eastbound Nez Perce crossed the Missouri and entered the Breaks country in their attempt to escape to Canada. The Cow Island Skirmish occurred in the Breaks and was the last encounter prior to the Nez Perce's surrender to the U.S. Army at the Battle of Bear Paw, just north of the monument."

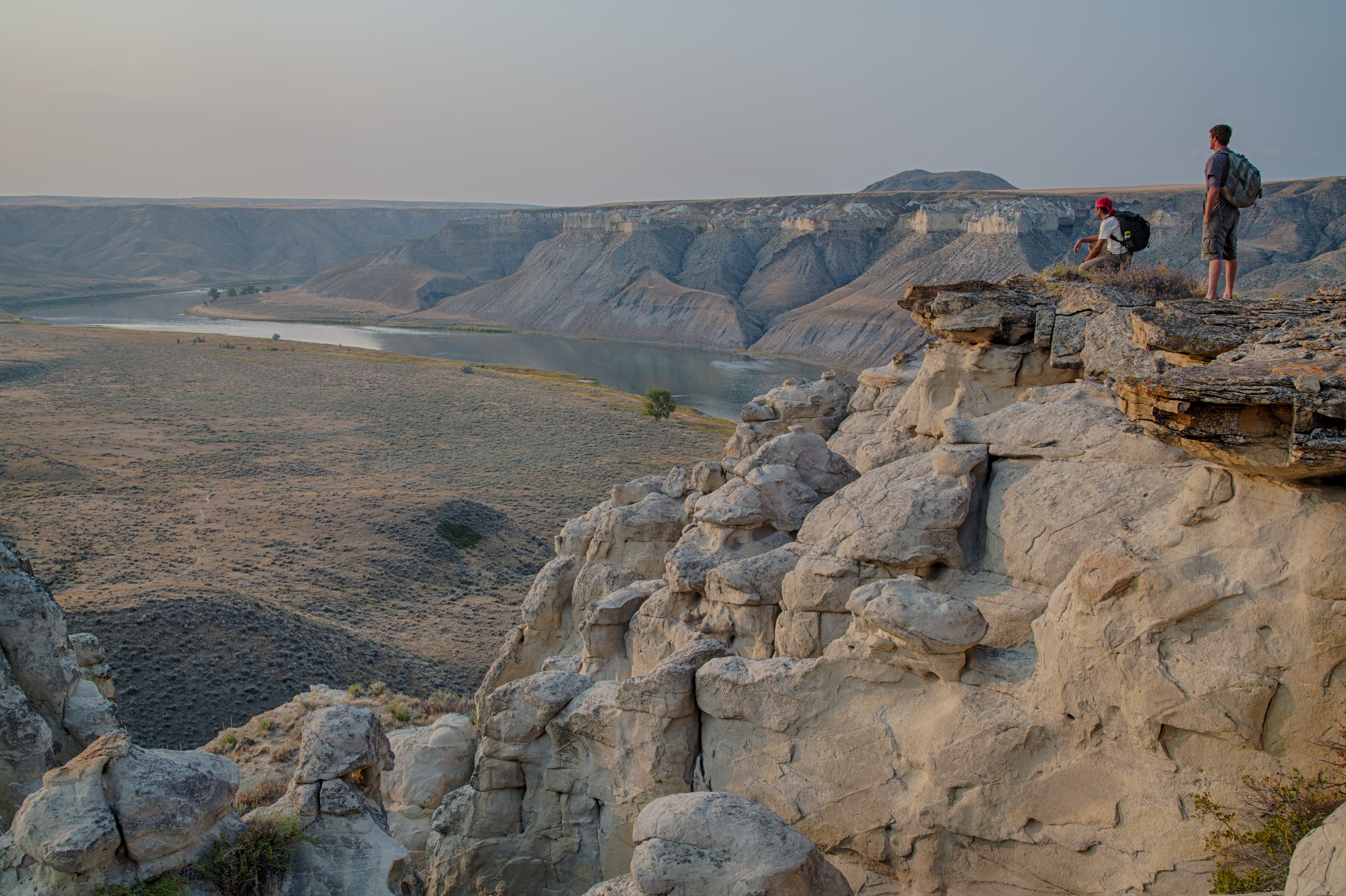
The Missouri River carved the Breaks into the Montana landscape

== Management and conservation ==
A full management plan is still under development due to various private inholdings and lease agreements between private citizens and the federal government. While conservationists would like to see some of the Breaks monument lands become designated as Wilderness, local ranchers and farmers under long standing lease agreements with the federal government, who graze upwards of 10,000 head of cattle annually within the new monument, are concerned that the monument status may adversely affect their livelihood and the economies of local towns.

Under the proposed management plan from the Department of the Interior, although the resources of the monument will be given better protection, "currently permitted livestock grazing, hunting, fishing, and similar activities will generally not be affected, nor will private property (approximately 81,911 acres (128 sq mi; 331 km^{2})) and state land (approximately 38,722 acres (61 sq mi; 157 km^{2})) within the boundary of the proposed monument, as well as other valid existing rights".

In 2013, the U.S. Court of Appeals ruled that the BLM's management plan violated historic site laws with their practices. The National Trust for Historic Preservation cited the site as one of ten historic sites saved in 2013.

The Breaks is home to at least sixty mammal species and hundreds of bird species. Willows and shrubs are found along the Missouri River banks while sagebrush and short grass prairie are dominant elsewhere.

== See also ==
- List of national monuments of the United States
- Montana Wilderness Association
- The Missouri Breaks - a 1976 western film centered around this area.
- Fred Robinson Bridge: A bridge over the Missouri within the monument boundaries
