= J. P. Pulliam Generating Station =

Electrical power station in Green Bay, Brown County, WIsconsin

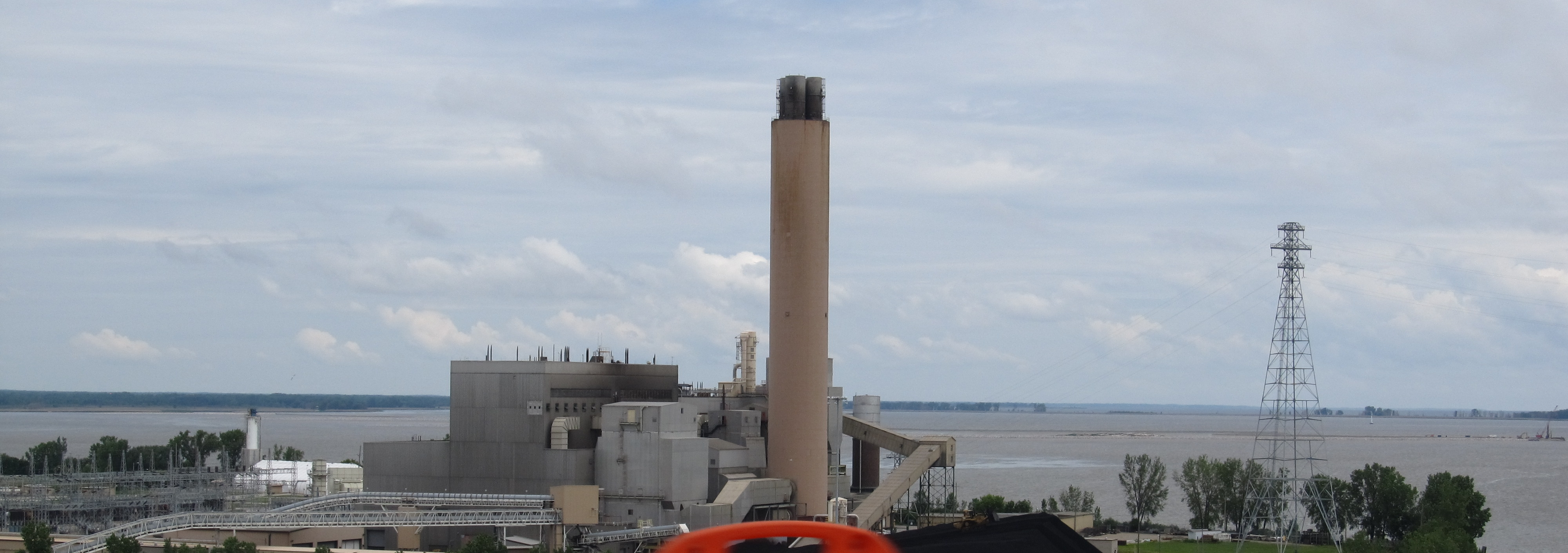
- View of the plant, circa 2013
- Country: United States
- Location: Green Bay, Wisconsin
- Coordinates: 44°32′24″N 88°00′31″W
- Status: Operational
- Commission date: Units 1–2: 1927; Unit 3: 1943; Unit 4: 1947; Unit 5: 1949; Unit 6: 1951; Unit 7: 1958; Unit 8: 1964; Unit P31: 2003
- Decommission date: Units 1–2: 1980; Units 3–4: 2007; Units 5–6: 2015; Units 7–8: 2018
- Owner: WEC Energy
- Operator: Wisconsin Public Service Corporation

Thermal power station
- Primary fuel: Natural gas
- Turbine technology: Combustion turbine
- Cooling source: Green Bay

Power generation
- Nameplate capacity: 83 MW

J. P. Pulliam Generating Station was an electrical power station powered by sub-bituminous coal, which could also be substituted by natural gas. It was located in Green Bay, Wisconsin in Brown County. The plant was named after the former Wisconsin Public Service Corporation president John Page Pulliam (–June 15, 1951). The plant units were connected to the power grid via 138 kV and 69 kV transmission lines. The remaining coal units on site were decommissioned in 2018 leaving only the natural gas fired P31 unit active at the site.

== Units ==
Units of J. P. Pulliam Generating Station
| Unit | Nameplate capacity | Initial year of operation | Notes |
|---|---|---|---|
| 1 | 10 MW | 1927 | Retired 1980 |
| 2 | 10 MW | 1927 | Retired 1980 |
| 3 | 30 MW | 1943 | Retired 2007 |
| 4 | 30 MW | 1947 | Retired 2007 |
| 5 | 50 MW | 1949 | 693 million BTU per hour, dry bottom boilers that burned pulverized coal. Retired c.2015. |
| 6 | 62.5 MW | 1951 | 875 million BTU per hour, dry bottom boilers that burned pulverized coal. Retired c.2015. |
| 7 | 75 MW | 1958 | 999 million BTU per hour, dry bottom boilers that burn pulverized coal. Retired c.2018. |
| 8 | 125 MW | 1964 | 1510 million BTU per hour, dry bottom boilers that burn pulverized coal. Retired c.2018. |
| P31 | 83 MW | 2003 | Combustion Turbine Generator (Natural Gas or Fuel Oil) |

== Retirement ==
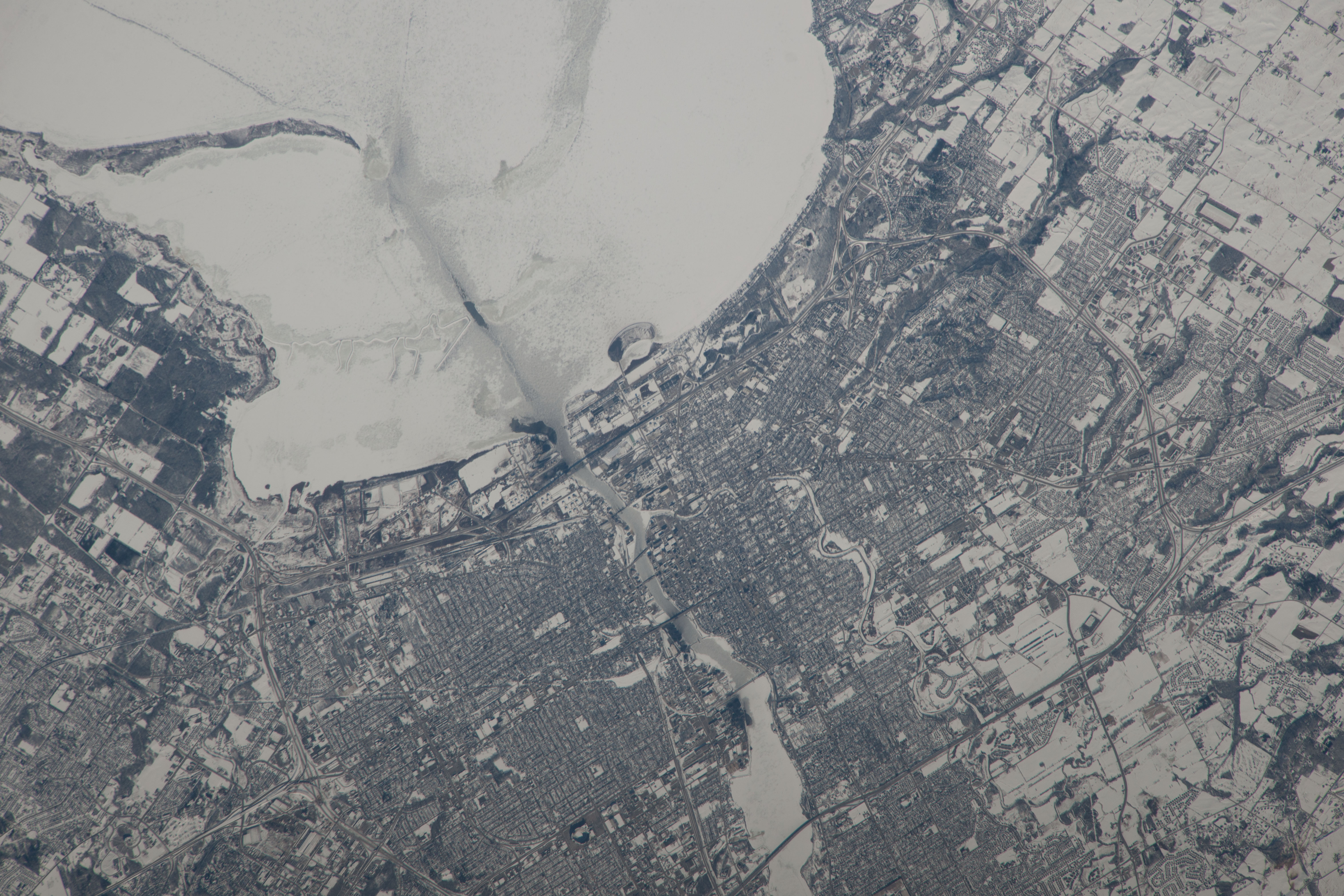
Open water appears near the mouth of the Fox due to the warmth of the water coming out of the generating station. Photo taken by an Expedition 38 crew member on February 22, 2014

As a result of EPA clean air act enforcement, two coal-fired units were retired at Pulliam in 2015 and WPSC was required to make $300 million in upgrades at the Weston Generating Station. Those costs were passed on to utility rate payers. At least ten positions were eliminated when Unit 5 and 6 were retired.

In 2016, WEC Energy (which purchased WPS in 2014) announced they would be retiring the remaining coal units at Pulliam due to lower natural gas prices and affordability of renewables, and they would retire the plant by the end of 2018. The plant was retired in October 2018, with most of its equipment auctioned off in March 2019.

Some local groups expressed concern that the closure may affect local bald eagle populations due to the lack of waste heat keeping the mouth of the Fox River from freezing in the winter, and peregrine falcon populations due to the removal of nesting boxes.

== See also ==
- List of power stations in Wisconsin
