= Oak Creek Power Plant =

Electrical power station in Oak Creek, Milwaukee County, Wisconsin

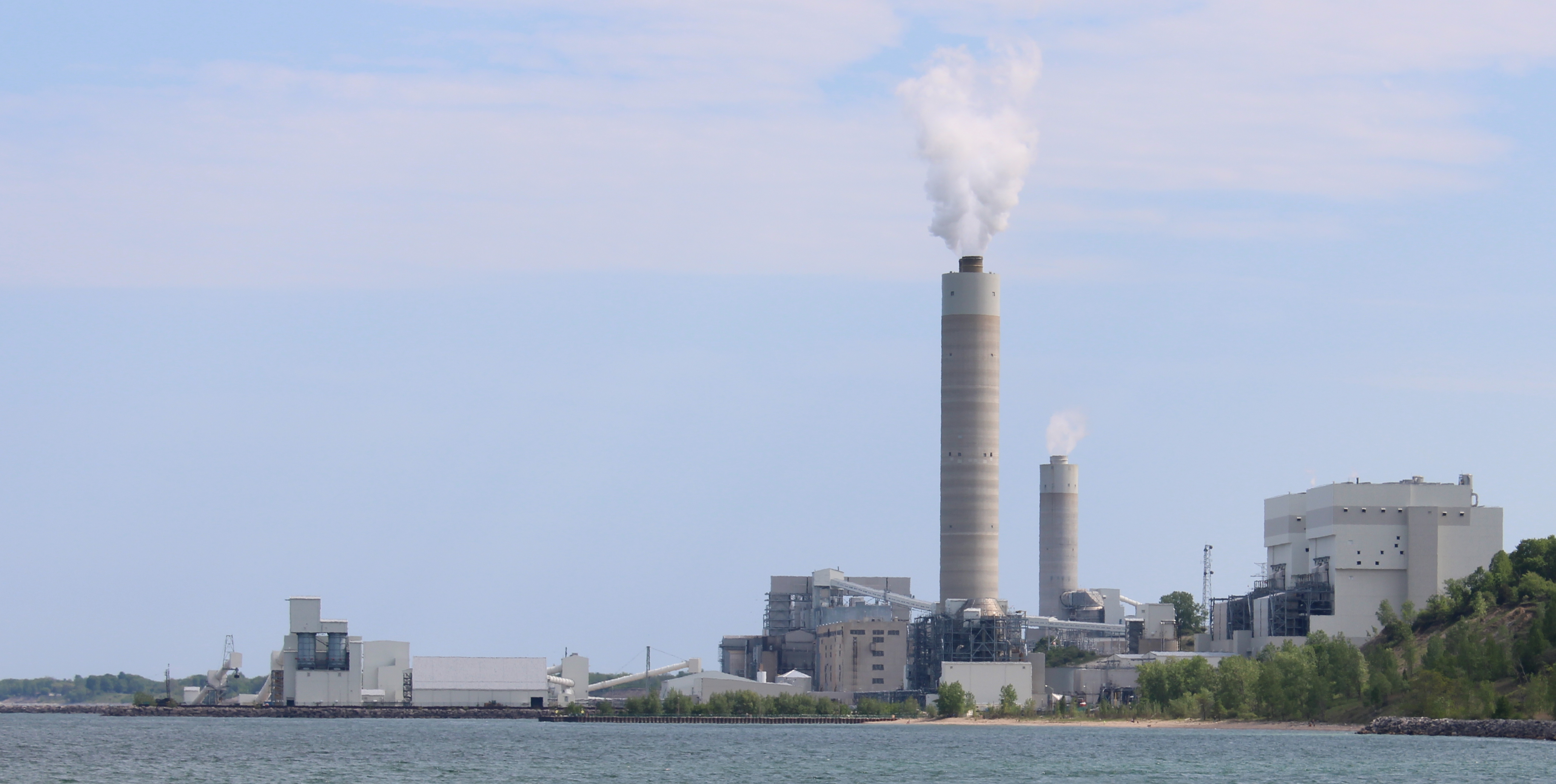
- Country: United States
- Location: Oak Creek, Wisconsin
- Coordinates: 42°50′40″N 87°49′43″W
- Status: Operational
- Commission date: Unit 5: December, 1959; Unit 6: December, 1961; Unit 7: March, 1965; Unit 8: October, 1967; Unit 9 (gas-fired): December, 1968 Unit 1 (Elm Road): 2010 Unit 2 (Elm Road): 2011
- Decommission date: Units 1–4: 1980s Planned closure of Units 5 & 6 May 2024; Planned closure of Units 7 & 8 2025
- Owner: We Energies

Thermal power station
- Primary fuel: Sub-bituminous coal
- Cooling source: Lake Michigan

Power generation
- Units operational: 1 x 261 MW; 1 x 264 MW; 1 x 298 MW; 1 x 312 MW; 2 x 634 MW
- Nameplate capacity: South Oak Creek; 1,135 MWe; Elm Road Generation Station; 1,268 megawatts
- Annual net output: Total (All Fuels, GWh); 2018 - 12,681; 2019 - 11,384; 2020 - 10,783; 2021 - 12,180

Oak Creek Power Plant, also known as South Oak Creek, is a base load, coal- and natural gas-fired, electrical power station located on Lake Michigan in Oak Creek, Wisconsin. Oak Creek Power Plant along with Elm Road Generation Station make up the entire Oak Creek Generating Site.

The plant was built for an initial cost of $246 million. It is located on over 400 acres (160 ha) of land on the border of Milwaukee and Racine counties.

Advanced Air Quality Control Systems (AQCS) were installed in 2012 for $750 million on all four generating units. In 2009, it was listed as the third largest generating station in Wisconsin with a net summer capacity of 1,135 MW. The plant consumes between 6,000 and 6,400 tons of coal daily depending on system demands.

In 2018, the plant was listed as the fifth largest generation station in Wisconsin with an annual generation of 4,767,153 MW-h, behind Point Beach Nuclear Power Plant (10,128,796 MW-h), Elm Road Generating Station (7,913,698 MW-h), Columbia (6,641,670 MW-h), and Port Washington Generating Station (5,829,109 MW-h).

On November 6, 2020 - A plan was announced that includes the retirement of the 1,100-megawatt South Oak Creek coal plant in southeastern Wisconsin over the next five years. Units 5 and 6 at South Oak Creek would be shut down in 2023 while units 7 and 8 will be shut down by 2024. The closures have since been delayed to May 2024 for Units 5 and 6 and late 2025 for Units 7 and 8.

== Expansion ==
In 2005, two 615-megawatt coal-fueled units were constructed just north of the existing Oak Creek facility. Unit 1 began commercial operation on February 2, 2010. with Unit 2 following in 2011.

As of 2026, it is estimated that the plant causes 22 deaths per year due to soot and smog pollution.

== Units ==
Unit	Capacity (MW)	Commissioning	Notes
1–4		1950s	Retired in the 1980s
5	275 (nameplate); 261 (summer); 262 (winter)	1959	Plans announced to stop burning coal by 2035.
6	275 (nameplate); 264 (summer); 265 (winter)	1961	Plans announced to stop burning coal by 2035.
7	317.6 (nameplate); 298 (summer); 298 (winter)	1965	Plans announced to stop burning coal by 2035.
8	324 (nameplate); 298 (summer); 298 (winter)	1967	Plans announced to stop burning coal by 2035.
9	18	1968	Natural gas combustion turbine for startup / standby power

== Electricity production ==
In 2021, Oak Creek Power Station (South Oak Creek Power Plant and Elm Road Generating Station combined) generated 12,180 GWh, approximately 19.46% of the total electric power generated in Wisconsin (62,584 GWh) for that year. The South Oak Creek Power Plant (coal only) had a 2021 annual capacity factor of 61.65% and the Elm Road Generating Station (coal only) had a 2021 annual capacity factor of 69.26%.

Generation (MW-h) of South Oak Creek Power Plant
Year	Jan	Feb	Mar	Apr	May	Jun	Jul	Aug	Sep	Oct	Nov	Dec	Annual (Total)
2001	594,828	386,288	578,131	436,293	420,042	498,311	581,496	616,278	550,459	425,936	381,037	387,989	5,857,088
2002	313,742	278,455	343,737	437,303	504,601	508,723	656,861	573,386	591,802	395,956	366,701	348,897	5,320,164
2003	483,785	543,226	403,931	400,037	341,862	486,333	558,267	517,715	502,669	611,095	512,605	521,029	5,882,554
2004	515,520	492,324	509,888	547,422	620,759	505,487	563,217	599,107	518,928	594,649	603,603	604,797	6,675,701
2005	419,601	483,080	512,637	309,243	466,286	582,895	534,209	525,192	478,640	522,034	457,986	538,734	5,830,537
2006	514,164	468,906	397,968	528,270	428,392	508,887	620,495	630,081	455,471	415,290	433,711	413,665	5,815,300
2007	436,879	308,027	472,268	467,187	291,119	438,908	439,940	502,457	522,073	604,577	537,923	609,785	5,631,143
2008	644,337	465,184	488,251	473,011	483,015	458,519	575,589	589,011	504,101	313,027	299,315	539,641	5,833,001
2009	418,354	366,090	371,469	208,214	255,481	205,145	370,662	396,817	354,979	527,799	437,597	486,923	4,399,530
2010	520,479	368,245	393,771	294,137	354,652	359,665	449,634	486,374	406,908	363,753	279,763	482,564	4,759,945
2011	449,824	394,542	482,445	415,671	382,364	480,110	500,914	563,176	520,005	559,962	195,935	407,215	5,352,163
2012	251,662	270,999	313,845	294,545	200,395	358,738	314,430	351,105	476,262	329,305	366,571	449,542	3,977,399
2013	429,890	447,066	234,966	294,847	508,249	509,382	583,892	371,217	363,135	335,769	305,937	362,475	4,746,825
2014	497,979	451,409	422,053	373,703	256,698	335,200	442,912	437,966	458,636	389,758	-1,058	236,204	4,301,460
2015	590,000	417,363	376,365	220,173	382,773	452,601	534,681	558,386	576,651	377,010	306,992	367,267	5,160,262
2016	450,687	138,721	237,137	254,619	259,392	350,326	454,283	528,469	371,782	249,577	230,720	304,734	3,830,447
2017	431,400	299,247	228,334	239,290	434,147	418,572	435,904	577,898	381,171	380,547	470,289	398,539	4,695,338
2018	464,871	455,040	168,219	265,170	206,501	407,102	523,526	528,979	472,707	411,130	321,556	508,348	4,733,149
2019	571,936	414,278	396,974	255,313	550,961	--	347,115	483,216	139,453	55,092	238,098	337,735	3,790,171
2020	336,925	162,630	152,374	52,597	48,356	309,385	527,558	353,924	239,277	267,058	250,114	320,169	3,020,367
2021	504,605	414,046	349,688	349,700	232,464	141,575	559,304	502,534	387,127	385,858	369,384	253,599	4,449,884
2022	371,242	328,695	304,499	251,093	312,481	344,032	406,326	321,783	221,459	174,093	142,192	208,574	3,386,470
2023	291,638	117,985	43,790	0	14,804								

Subnotes:

(1) : Table data reflects electrical generation from coal fuels only (subbituminous coal, refined coal). The plant also generates a minor amount of electricity (less than 1%) from natural gas.

(2) : Major fuel changed from subbituminous coal to refined coal in January 2016. The major fuel changed back to subbituminous coal in March 2022 .

Generation (MW-h) of Elm Road Generating Station
Year	Jan	Feb	Mar	Apr	May	Jun	Jul	Aug	Sep	Oct	Nov	Dec	Annual (Total)
2010	0	48,568	-1,840	49,662	201,912	154,065	223,351	1,656	26,969	42,664	340,628	331,711	1,419,346
2011	509,557	375,435	444,647	433,011	274,068	512,028	635,325	522,383	276,896	99,558	345,775	315,362	4,744,045
2012	216,962	59,442	198,746	221,462	156,845	67,051	415,510	573,298	59,517	0	-11,079	-12,698	1,945,056
2013	163,875	265,684	70,368	8,213	347,684	348,443	644,009	465,133	300,761	-8,772	157,720	559,077	3,322,195
2014	714,311	426,494	366,194	645,674	641,388	697,290	531,564	765,127	433,923	171,078	607,447	782,848	6,783,338
2015	689,718	563,248	488,205	542,180	733,797	582,022	742,283	658,592	397,922	415,376	697,745	583,267	7,094,355
2016	607,163	741,395	631,347	668,285	383,667	785,660	835,455	867,693	660,693	176,967	574,292	879,869	7,812,486
2017	905,955	798,714	782,578	521,480	443,478	635,060	883,074	490,738	519,759	382,538	453,522	552,687	7,369,583
2018	442,866	479,164	534,132	711,323	661,782	677,270	858,066	781,569	528,178	585,734	753,872	876,252	7,890,208
2019	637,419	771,005	523,369	534,925	428,616	0	739,105	817,677	765,115	804,830	723,552	812,844	7,558,457
2020	561,777	766,579	822,821	487,910	590,824	691,849	920,085	918,006	841,132	531,151	422,459	178,193	7,732,786
2021	566,469	793,448	909,124	492,576	913,375	891,823	907,844	898,235	669,305	301,026	-2,183	353,921	7,694,963
2022	674,073	632,632	489,365	479,334	378,274	273,575	667,146	734,253	422,028	106,308	401,028	658,207	5,916,223
2023	493,599	498,291	729,680	297,084	447,144								

Subnotes:

1. Table data reflects electrical generation from all coal fuels only (bituminous coal, subbituminous coal, and refined coal). The plant also generates a minor amount of electricity (less than 1%) from natural gas.

== Incidents ==
On February 3, 2009, six contract workers were injured when coal dust ignited in a 65-foot coal dust silo on the power plant site. They had been preparing the structure for repairs when an unknown source ignited coal dust that had accumulated at the top of the silo. All suffered burns.

On October 31, 2011, a bluff area roughly the size of a football field and 200 feet above the level of Lake Michigan eroded, washing mud and debris into Lake Michigan. Close to 100 workers were at the site at the time of the collapse; none were hurt or killed.

== See also ==
- List of power stations in Wisconsin
