= List of power stations in Wisconsin =

Sources of Wisconsin utility-scale electricity generation in gigawatt-hours, full-year 2025:
1. Natural gas: 23,722 (35.6%)
2. Coal: 23,350 (35.0%)
3. Nuclear: 10,176 (15.3%)
4. Solar: 4,029 (6.04%)
5. Hydroelectric: 2,187 (3.28%)
6. Wind: 1,964 (2.94%)
7. Biomass: 1,204 (1.80%)
8. Petroleum: 67 (0.10%)
9. Other: 24 (0.04%)

This is a list of electricity-generating power stations in the U.S. state of Wisconsin, sorted by type and name. In 2024, Wisconsin had a total summer capacity of 17.4 GW through all of its power plants, and a net generation of 65,276 GWh. The electrical energy generation mix in 2025 was 35.6% natural gas, 35% coal, 15.3% nuclear, 6% solar, 3.3% hydroelectric, 2.9% wind, 1.8% biomass (including refuse-derived fuel), 0.1% petroleum, and less than 0.1% other.

The Fox River powered the world's first commercial hydroelectric central power station, the Vulcan Street Plant, during 1882 to 1891. An exact replica of the plant, designated as a National Historic Engineering Landmark, is located near the original site in Appleton. Wisconsin also has the nation's oldest (since 1891) continuously operating hydroelectric facility, in Whiting, according to the U.S. Energy Information Administration.

During the first half of the 20th century, Wisconsin's utility companies pioneered efficiency improvements for coal-fired electricity generation at the former East Wells (Onieda) Street Power Plant, and former Port Washington Power Plant. Nuclear power has generated Wisconsin's largest share of carbon-free electrical energy since 1970. Natural gas generation has nearly quadrupled over the past decade to replace retiring facilities and satisfy rising demand.

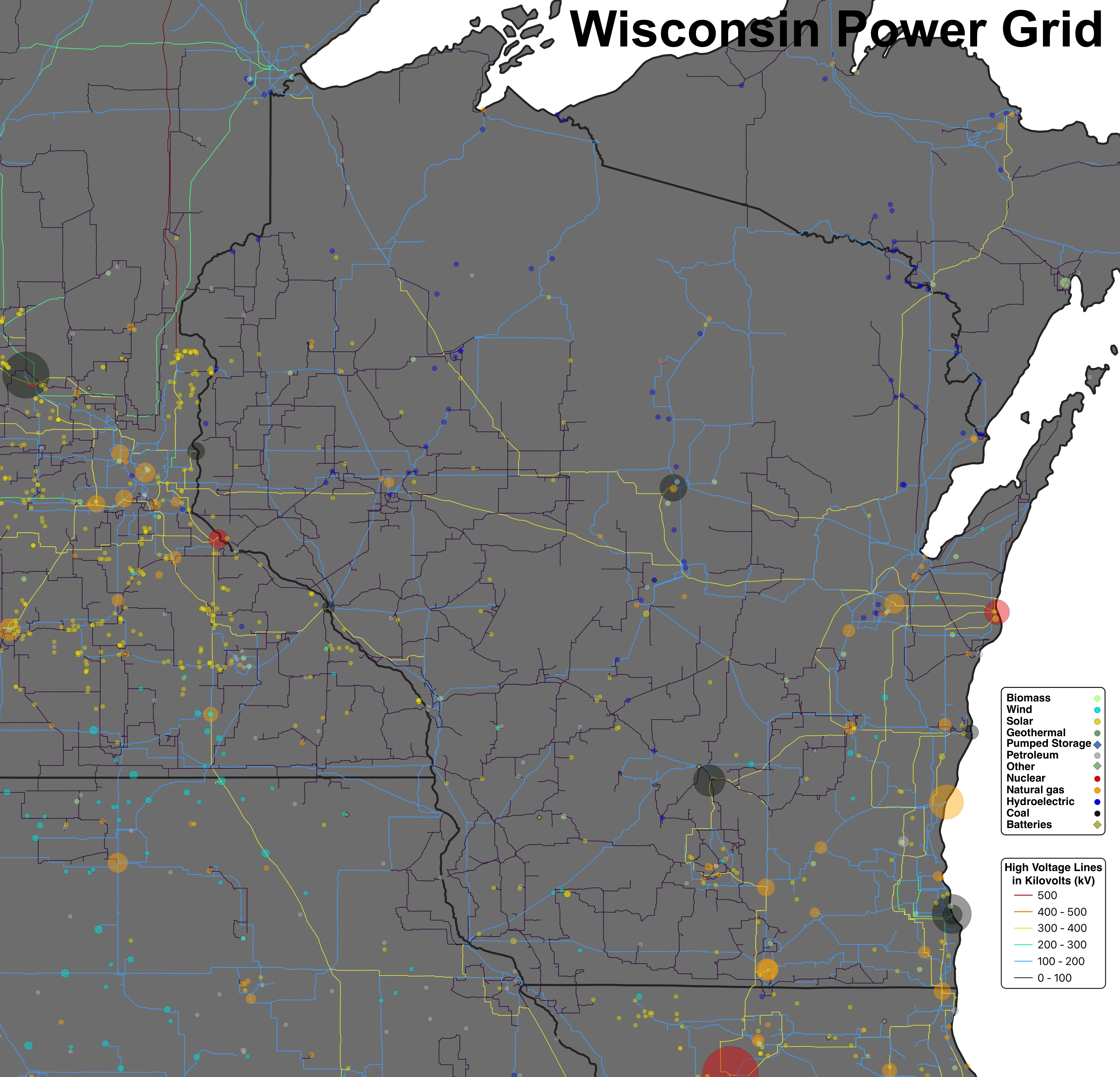
Wisconsin power grid

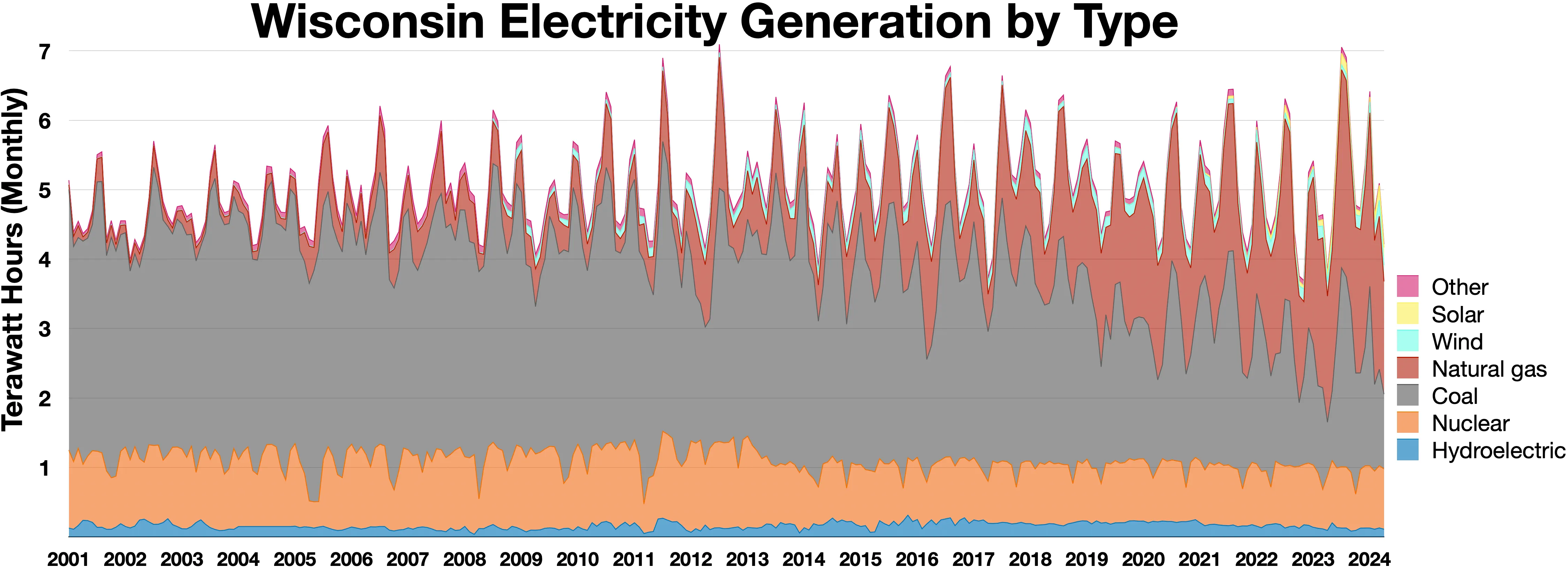
Wisconsin electricity generation by type

== Nuclear power stations ==
Plant	Location	Coordinates	Capacity (MW)	Ref	Year opened	Note
Point Beach Nuclear Plant	Two Rivers, Wisconsin	44.28181°N 87.53599°W	1250		1970/1972	

Retired facilities:

- Kewaunee Nuclear Generating Station - 556 MW: operated 1974-2013
- La Crosse Boiling Water Reactor - 50 MW: operated 1969-1987

== Fossil-fuel power stations ==
Data from the U.S. Energy Information Administration serves as a general reference.

=== Coal-fired ===
Plant	Location	Coordinates	Capacity (MW)	Ref	Year opened	Note
Columbia Energy Center	Portage, Wisconsin	43°29′10″N 89°25′13″W	1137		1975/1978	closing in 2029, potential transition to natural gas
Edgewater Generating Station	Sheboygan, Wisconsin	43°42′56″N 87°42′23″W	414		1985	closing in 2028, proposed transition to natural gas
Elm Road Generating Station	Oak Creek, Wisconsin	42.8492°N 87.8336°W	1263		2010/2011	planned conversion to natural gas by 2026
Genoa Generating Station	Genoa, Wisconsin	43°33′33″N 91°13′55″W	308		1969	closed 2021
John P. Madgett Generating Station	Alma, Wisconsin	44°18′11″N 91°54′45″W	390		1979	
Oak Creek Power Plant	Oak Creek, Wisconsin	42.8457°N 87.8294°W	1097		1959-1967	closing late 2026
Weston Generating Station	Weston, Wisconsin	44°51′31″N 89°38′59″W	879		1981/2008	see also natural gas

=== Natural gas-fired ===
Plant	Location	Coordinates	Capacity (MW)	Generation type	Ref	Year opened	Note
Blackhawk Generating Station	Beloit, Wisconsin	42°30′23″N 89°01′56″W	50	Steam turbine		1946/1948	1913 coal plant. closed 2010
Blount Generating Station	Madison, Wisconsin	43°04′45″N 89°22′27″W	95	Steam turbine (x2)		1957/1961	
Concord Generating Station	Watertown, Wisconsin	43°10′05″N 88°41′13″W	364	Simple cycle (x4)		1993/1994	
De Pere Energy Center	De Pere, Wisconsin	44.4486°N 88.0720°W	167	Simple cycle		1999	
Fox Energy Center	Town of Kaukauna, Wisconsin	44.3205°N 88.2089°W	568	2x1 combined cycle		2005/2006	
Germantown Gas Turbine	Germantown, Wisconsin	43°11′46″N 88°09′01″W	81	Simple cycle		2000	see also petrol
Neenah Power Plant	Neenah, Wisconsin	44.1936°N 88.5064°W	299	Simple cycle (x2)		2000	
Paris Generating Station	Town of Paris, near Union Grove, Wisconsin	42°39′57″N 88°00′47″W	362	Simple cycle (x4)		1995	
Port Washington Generating Station	Port Washington, Wisconsin	43°58′37″N 87°52′12″W	1204	2x1 combined cycle (x2)		2005/2008	
Pulliam Power Plant	Green Bay, Wisconsin	44.5400°N 88.0086°W	80	Simple cycle		2003	closed 2018
Riverside Energy Center	Town of Beloit, Wisconsin	42°34′58″N 89°02′07″W	567	2x1 combined cycle		2004	
RockGen Energy Center	Town of Christiana, Wisconsin	42°58′37″N 89°02′55″W	489	Simple cycle (x3)		2001	
Sheboygan Falls Plant	Sheboygan Falls, Wisconsin	43.7518°N 87.8781°W	306	Simple cycle (x2)		2005	
South Fond Du Lac	Fond Du Lac, Wisconsin	43.7353°N 88.4967°W	344	Simple cycle (x4)		1993-1996	
Valley Power Plant	Milwaukee, Wisconsin	43°01′47″N 87°55′26″W	263	Steam turbine (x2)		1968/1969	
West Campus Cogeneration Facility	Madison, Wisconsin	43.0751°N 89.4251°W	126	1x1 combined cycle		2005	
West Marinette Plant	Marinette, Wisconsin	45.0869°N 87.6881°W	154	Simple cycle (x4)		1971-2000	
Weston Generating Station	Weston, Wisconsin	44°51′31″N 89°38′59″W	75	Simple cycle		1960	see also coal
Wheaton Generating Plant	Town of Wheaton, Wisconsin	44°53′09″N 91°30′57″W	186	Simple cycle (x4)		1973	
Whitewater Cogeneration Plant	Whitewater, Wisconsin	42°51′19″N 88°43′48″W	261	1x1 combined cycle		1997	

=== Petroleum-fired ===
Plant	Location	Coordinates	Capacity (MW)	Generation type	Ref	Year opened	Note
Epic Verona Power Plant	Verona, Wisconsin	42.9968°N 89.5687°W	41	Reciprocating engine (x18)		2009/2013	
French Island Generating Plant	La Crosse, Wisconsin	43.8292°N 91.2597°W	122	Simple cycle (x2)		1974	see also biomass/refuse
Germantown Power Plant	Germantown, Wisconsin	43°11′46″N 88°009′01″W	189	Simple cycle (x4)		1978	see also gas
Manitowoc Power Plant	Manitowoc, Wisconsin	44.082°N 87.6558°W	58	Steam turbine		2007	petroleum coke; see also biomass/refuse

== Renewable power stations ==
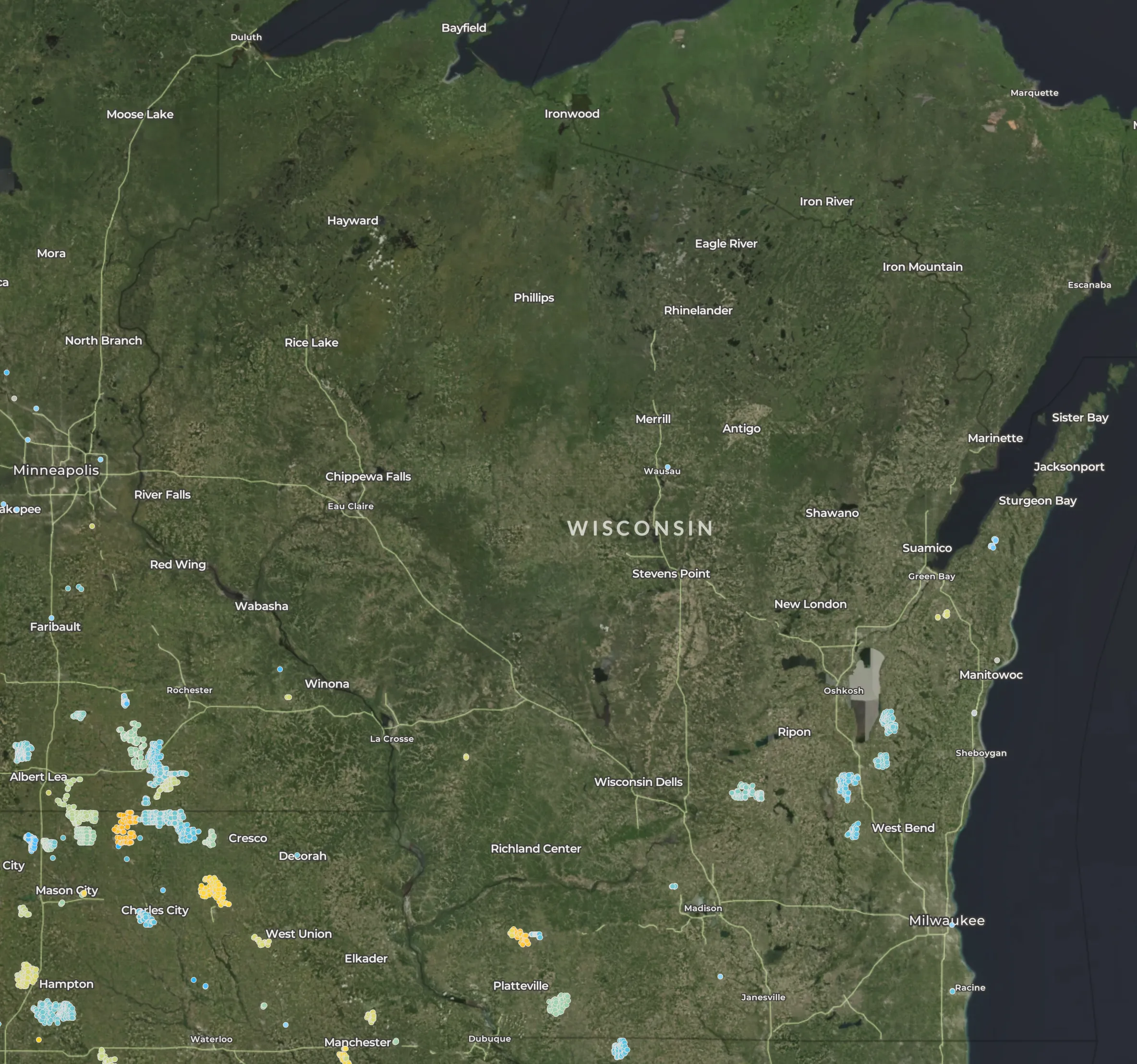
Wisconsin wind power map

Data from the U.S. Energy Information Administration serves as a general reference. Renew Wisconsin maintains additional data on the state's renewable generation resources.

=== Biomass and refuse ===
Name	Location	Coordinates	Capacity (MW)	Fuel type	Ref	Year opened	Note
Ameresco Janesville	Rock County	42.7083°N 89.0208°W	3.0	landfill gas		2004	
Bay Front Plant	Ashland County	46.5872°N 90.9017°W	47.0	wood/ wood waste		1952	co-fired with natural gas
Berlin Landfill	Green Lake County	43.9603°N 88.9158°W	2.4	landfill gas		2001	
Dairyland WTE Plant	Brown County	44.5401°N 87.8056°W	1.4	biogas		2012	
Dane Community Digester	Dane County	43.2172°N 89.4792°W	2.0	biogas		2011	
Deertrack Park Landfill	Jefferson County	43.0900°N 88.7397°W	6.4	landfill gas		2006/2007	
FCPC Renewable Generation	Milwaukee County	43.0300°N 87.9409°W	2.0	biogas		2013	
Fiber Recovery Landfill	Marathon County	44.8875°N 89.3859°W	2.4	landfill gas		2008	
Flambeau River Papers	Price County	45.9356°N 90.4472°W	5.7	wood/ wood waste		1982	
French Island Generating Plant	La Crosse County	43.8292°N 91.2597°W	16.0	wood/ wood waste/ refuse		1940/1948	co-fired with petrol
GL Dairy Biogas	Dane County	43.1244°N 89.5450°W	2.0	biogas		2013	
GreenWhey Energy	Polk County	45.3903°N 92.1625°W	3.2	biogas		2013	
Holsum Dairy	Calumet County	44.1150°N 88.2172°W	2.2	biogas		2001/2006	
Kaukauna Paper Mill	Outagamie County	44.2826°N 88.2534°W	32.6	wood/ wood waste		1951/1962/ 1977	
Manitowoc Power Plant	Manitowoc County	44.0820°N 87.6558°W	44.0	wood/ wood waste		1955/1962	
Metro Landfill GR	Milwaukee County	42.8506°N 88.0697°W	3.2	landfill gas		2000	
Mosinee Mill	Marathon County	44.7881°N 89.6917°W	48.0	wood/ wood waste		1951/1976	
MMSD Wastewater	Milwaukee County	42.8869°N 87.8422°W	5.0	biogas		2000/2009/ 2010	
Nekoosa Paper Mill	Wood County	44.3142°N 89.8964°W	12.5	wood/ wood waste		1991	
Outagamie Landfill Cogen	Outagamie County	44.2869°N 88.3339°W	6.4	landfill gas		2007/2016	
Pheasant Run Landfill GR	Kenosha County	42.5825°N 88.0436°W	8.8	landfill gas		1992/1996/ 2000/2002	
Richland Center	Richland County	43.3144°N 90.3731°W	1.6	biogas		2013	
Ridgeview Landfill GR	Manitowoc County	44.1750°N 87.8285°W	6.4	landfill gas		2002/2006	
Rothschild Biomass Cogen Facility	Marathon County	44.8878°N 89.6297°W	46.1	wood/ wood waste		2013	
Timberline Trail Landfill GR	Rusk County	45.4533°N 91.3583°W	4.0	landfill gas		2006	
Winnebago Landfill GR	Winnebago County	44.0830°N 88.5411°W	3.9	landfill gas		2000/2007/ 2010/2019	
Wisconsin Rapids Pulp Mill	Wood County	44.8878°N 89.6297°W	64.7	wood/ wood waste		1968/1991	

=== Hydroelectric ===
- WE Energies operates 13 hydro facilities, totaling 89 MW.
- Alliant Energy operates two hydro facilities, maxing out at 31 MW.

Plant	Location	Coordinates	Capacity (MW)	Ref	Year opened	Notes
Appleton Powerhouse	Outagamie County	44.25393°N 88.40956°W	2.2		1901	
Big Fall Hydro	Rusk County	44.6194°N 89.0149°W	3.3		1922	1.1 MW added 1993
Big Falls Mill Pond	Waupaca County	44.61946°N 89.01502°W	0.4		1926	
Biron Falls Hydro	Wood County	44.4321°N 89.7791°W	5.4		1896	2.6 MW added 1921
Castle Rock Hydro	Adams County	43.8656°N 89.9514°W	15.0		1950	
Chippewa Falls Hydro	Chippewa County	44.9321°N 91.3891°W	21.6		1928	
Cornell Hydro	Chippewa County	45.164°N 91.1574°W	35.3		1976	
Dells Hydro	Eau Claire County	44.8281°N 91.5111°W	12.3		1923	
DuBay Hydro	Portage County	44.4741°N 89.495°W	7.2		1942	
Flambeau Hydro Station	Rusk County	45.4918°N 91.0472°W	22.0		1951	
Grandfather Falls Hydro	Lincoln County	45.3019°N 89.7917°W	17.2		1938	
Holcombe Hydro	Chippewa County	45.2236°N 91.1272°W	33.9		1950	
Jim Falls Hydro	Chippewa County	45.051°N 91.274°W	59.8		1988	
Kilbourn Hydro	Columbia County	43.6258°N 89.7808°W	10		1926	units added 1935-1939
Ladysmith Hydro	Rusk County	45.4647°N 91.0832°W	1.0		1940	0.4 MW added 1983
Little Quinnesec Falls Hydro	Marinette County	45.7736°N 87.9894°W	9.0		1900	units added 1909-1916
Middle Appleton Hydro	Outagamie County	44.257303°N 88.404806°W	1.2		1950	
Petenwell Hydro	Juneau County	44.0572°N 90.0217°W	20.0		1949	
Prairie Du Sac Hydro	Sauk County	43.3099°N 89.7278°W	31		1915	units added 1920-1922, 1938-1940
St Croix Falls Hydro	Polk County	45.4117°N 92.6469°W	23.2		1910	units added 1917, 1923
Stevens Point Hydro	Portage County	44.5161°N 89.5858°W	4.8		1918	
Twin Falls Hydro	Florence County	45.8728°N 88.0708°W	9.2		2016	
Whiting Hydro	Portage County	44.4873°N 89.5760°W	5.1		1891	1.2 MW added 1993
Wisconsin Rapids Hydro	Wood County	44.3939°N 89.8250°W	8.8		1903	4.6 MW added 1920
Wissota Hydro	Chippewa County	44.9378°N 91.3406°W	39.4		1917	

=== Wind ===
Project name	Location	Coordinates	Capacity (MW)	Ref	Year opened	Note
Blue Sky Green Field Wind Energy Center	Towns of Marshfield and Calumet in Fond du Lac County	43.8794°N 88.2708°W	145		2008	
Butler Ridge Wind Energy Center	Dodge County	43.4003°N 88.4811°W	54		2009	
Cashton Greens Wind Farm	Cashton, Wisconsin at the Organic Valley corporate headquarters	43.7339°N 90.8050°W	5.0		2012	
Cedar Ridge Wind Farm	Towns of Eden and Empire in Fond du Lac County	43.6926°N 88.3297°W	68		2008	
Forward Wind Energy Center	Near Brownsville, Wisconsin in Dodge and Fond du Lac Counties	43°37′1″N 88°29′28″W	129		2008	
Galactic Wind Farm	Near Waunakee, Wisconsin in Dane County	43.1751°N 89.5503°W	10		2012	
Glacier Hills Wind Park	Towns of Randolph and Scott in Columbia County	43.5638°N 89.1480°W	162		2011	
Monfort Wind Energy Center	Town of Eden in Iowa County, Wisconsin	42.9625°N 90.3867°W	30		2002	
Quilt Block Wind Farm	Lafayette County	42.6733°N 90.2653°W	98		2017	
Red Barn Wind Park	Grant County	42.9756°N 90.4809°W	92		2023	
Rosiere Wind Farm	Towns of Lincoln and Red River in Kewaunee County	44.6695°N 87.6333°W	11		1999	
Shirley Windpower	Brown County	44.3481°N 87.9278°W	20		2010	

=== Solar ===
Project name	Location	Coordinates	Capacity (MW_{AC})	Ref	Year opened	Note
Arcadia Solar	Trempealeau County	44.2434°N 91.4582°W	5.0		2019	
Cashton Solar	Monroe County	43.7370°N 90.8050°W	2.0		2019	
Cumberland Solar	Barron County	45.5110°N 92.0250°W	2.5		2019	
Eau Claire Solar Garden	Eau Claire County	44.7846°N 91.5239°W	1.0		2018	
Fennimore Solar	Grant County	42.9710°N 90.6620°W	3.0		2019	
Flambeau Solar	Price County	45.7368°N 90.4710°W	2.5		2017	
Hodag Solar	Oneida County	45.608°N 89.443°W	7.5		2022	
Medford DPC Solar	Taylor County	45.1630°N 90.3729°W	2.0		2017	
New Auburn DPC Solar	Chippewa County	45.2100°N 91.4353°W	2.5		2018	
New Lisbon Solar	Juneau County	43.8830°N 90.1360°W	2.5		2019	
Rock River Solar	Rock County	42.5788°N 89.0330°W	2.1		2016	
Strix Solar	Dane County	42.9719°N 89.3932°W	6		2025	
Two Creeks Solar Park	Manitowoc County	44°14′52″N 87°32′36″W	150		2020	
Tyto Solar	Dane County	42.9885°N 89.3770°W	6		2024	
Warren DPC Solar	St Croix County	44.9596°N 92.5182°W	2.2		2017	

== See also ==
- Dairyland Power Cooperative
- Richland Electric Cooperative
