= Columbia Energy Center =

Electrical power station in Pacific, Columbia County, Wisconsin

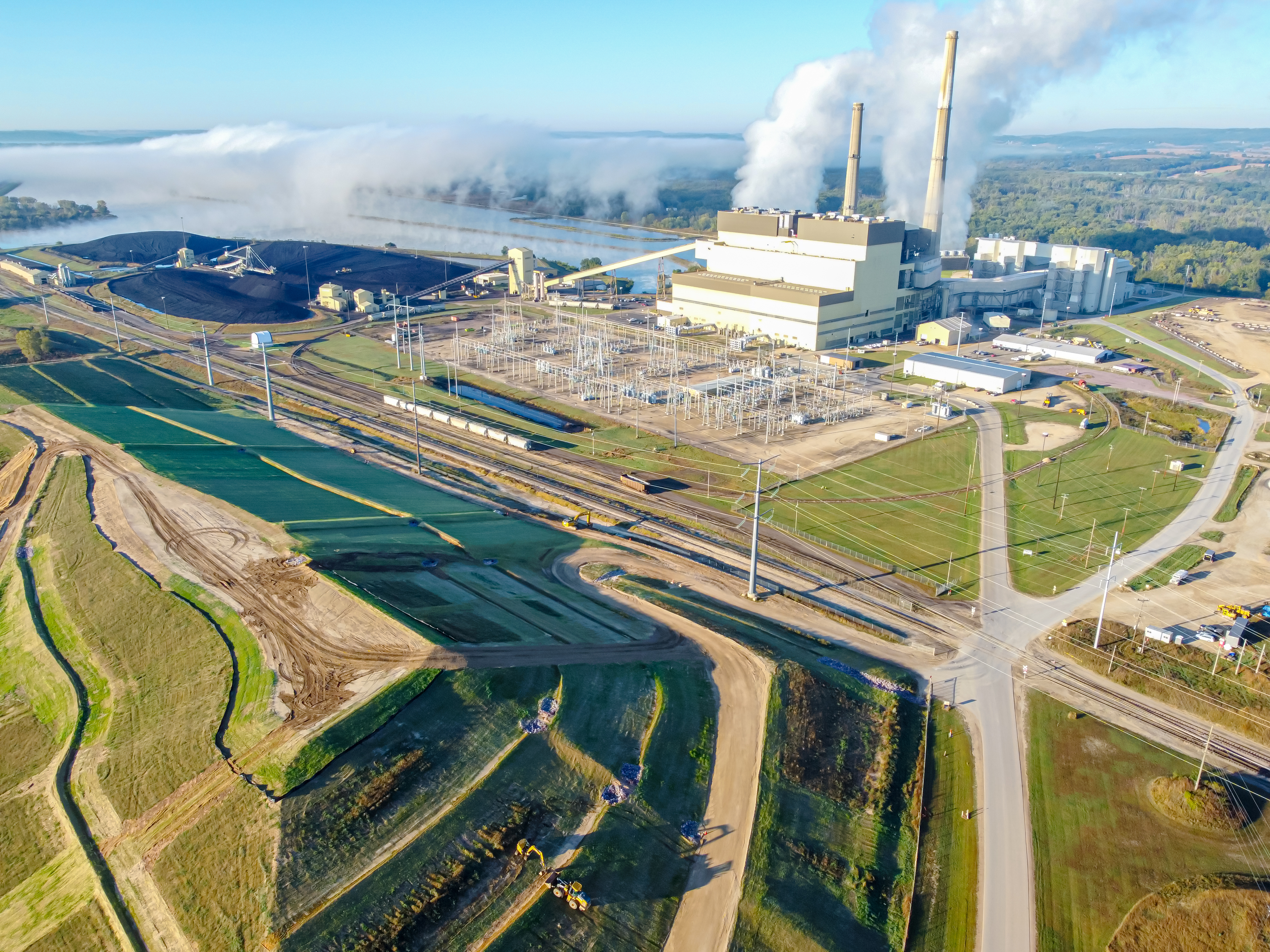
- Coal ash pond landfill in the foreground
- Country: United States
- Location: Dekorra, south of Portage, Wisconsin
- Coordinates: 43°29′10″N 89°25′13″W
- Status: Active, under construction
- Commission date: 1975–1978
- Owners: Wisconsin Power and Light Company (46.2%), Wisconsin Public Service (31.8%), Madison Gas and Electric (22%)

Thermal power station
- Primary fuel: Coal
- Cooling source: Lake Columbia

Power generation
- Nameplate capacity: 1023 MW
- Capacity factor: 46.99% (2023)
- Annual net output: 4211 GWh (2023)

External links
- Commons: Related media on Commons

Columbia Energy Center is a base load, sub-bituminous coal-fired, electrical power station located south of Portage in the Town of Pacific, Columbia County, Wisconsin. Ownership is 46.2% Wisconsin Power and Light Company (Alliant Energy), 31.8% Wisconsin Public Service (Integrys Energy Group), and 22% Madison Gas and Electric (MGE).

== History ==
Columbia Energy Center was built in the early 1970s. Unit 1 went online in 1975 and Unit 2 went online in 1978, with nameplate capacities of 512 MW and 511 MW, respectively.

In 2009, faced with environmental regulations regarding future operations, the owners of Columbia Energy Center invested in upgrades to the plant. The owners submitted an Electric Generation Expansion Analysis System (EGEAS) summary report to the Public Service Commission of Wisconsin on April 2, 2009. The report presented the results of a planning and scenarios analysis to support Wisconsin Power and Light, Wisconsin Public Service Corporation, and MGE's joint application for a Certificate of Authority (CA) for the installation of emission controls at the facility.

Although not required by law, the Commission held a hearing on the matter of the upgrade after several parties, including the Citizens Utility Board (CUB), Clean Wisconsin (Clean WI), and the Sierra Club, filed a joint request to intervene.

Columbia's owners were granted a Certificate authorizing the installation of air emissions reductions systems and associated equipment on March 11, 2011, at an estimate cost of $627 million. Construction began on April 16, 2012, and was completed in December 2014 at a total cost of $589 million.

On February 2, 2021, Alliant Energy, the majority owner and operator of the Columbia Energy Center announced the plant will shut down by 2025. On June 23, 2022, Alliant announced that CEC's decommissioning date would be delayed until mid-2026, due to the ongoing supply chain issues and to hedge against an energy shortage in upcoming years, with CEC mainly being in service during peak periods.

MGE then pushed back the retirement date of both units to June 2026.

In December 2024 the date was further pushed back to 2029, to allow for conversion to natural gas.

== Future plans ==
After receiving a $30 million federal grant, Alliant Energy announced it would build a 20MW / 200MWh storage system on the site, similar to a prototype in Italy. The storage system is a novel closed-system carbon dioxide technology that converts the gas to liquid and back again at 75% efficiency, depending on demand. An application to construct, own, and operate the system was filed on August 7, 2024 with the Wisconsin PSC.

== Peregrine falcons ==
An active peregrine falcon nest has been located on the stack of Unit 1 since 2006. The nest has produced over 60 peregrine falcon young in that time (3.3/yr).

== Public health ==
As of 2026, it is estimated that the plant causes 31 deaths per year due to soot and smog pollution.

== Electricity generation ==
In 2023, Columbia Energy Center generated 4,211 GWh, approximately 6.6% of the total electric power generated in Wisconsin (63,216 GWh) for that year. The plant had a 2023 annual capacity factor of 46.99%.

Electrical Generation (MW-h) of Columbia Energy Center
Year	Jan	Feb	Mar	Apr	May	Jun	Jul	Aug	Sep	Oct	Nov	Dec	Annual (Total)
2001	642,820	247,770	518,771	637,701	649,573	661,011	702,598	651,353	586,758	733,229	611,023	670,110	7,312,717
2002	668,371	404,604	560,226	335,436	324,886	598,798	668,431	665,689	576,658	536,217	529,475	603,363	6,472,154
2003	659,943	327,988	392,363	675,770	660,647	641,584	655,060	669,915	640,918	534,049	609,723	638,706	7,106,666
2004	383,676	619,858	670,831	429,457	494,807	641,466	639,495	637,499	657,645	632,399	678,152	624,761	7,110,046
2005	572,172	264,620	370,953	332,547	535,716	671,913	708,256	683,039	644,925	722,464	537,604	654,830	6,699,039
2006	469,660	282,812	482,381	487,178	551,345	627,756	697,236	595,374	623,681	641,130	665,286	625,194	6,749,033
2007	458,424	531,772	407,459	584,306	626,137	668,775	612,109	662,360	651,027	633,738	672,419	576,814	7,085,340
2008	375,059	397,372	457,036	686,663	705,323	624,840	709,923	715,716	631,597	697,391	643,677	673,024	7,317,621
2009	417,796	443,918	384,220	444,501	405,887	505,353	588,817	631,489	635,711	686,061	644,015	693,676	6,481,444
2010	435,594	412,034	433,599	652,619	711,952	679,921	719,898	723,665	570,873	649,259	586,714	680,659	7,256,787
2011	437,302	450,502	647,039	458,340	495,875	646,546	645,163	646,764	647,981	667,256	558,440	675,667	6,976,875
2012	451,980	401,013	349,374	605,789	703,619	649,765	678,785	727,720	669,136	712,572	626,653	743,799	7,320,205
2013	709,899	548,318	436,782	419,630	393,665	619,922	679,403	743,253	642,453	732,916	621,870	690,299	7,238,410
2014	534,949	344,603	639,295	450,183	286,048	587,113	466,092	370,543	244,127	247,022	392,454	377,506	4,939,935
2015	458,555	328,153	338,570	247,374	307,023	503,666	547,214	528,561	535,086	466,017	233,831	365,608	4,859,658
2016	272,871	178,897	217,034	223,158	466,190	543,414	617,404	677,756	519,535	548,796	338,510	373,334	4,976,899
2017	448,843	429,460	395,089	356,235	543,397	592,033	662,933	620,854	592,989	579,969	620,175	667,367	6,509,344
2018	436,005	300,944	499,424	616,208	569,643	462,686	643,897	669,221	639,473	617,291	666,096	520,782	6,641,670
2019	571,530	481,686	317,028	268,125	492,822	445,205	599,811	477,535	485,133	409,648	501,284	316,756	5,366,563
2020	439,857	444,990	311,850	200,944	272,560	458,864	519,223	583,612	357,494	344,918	522,848	729,745	5,186,905
2021	558,710	621,069	465,640	330,631	299,028	680,295	739,397	730,481	560,869	327,610	271,034	322,049	5,906,813
2022	489,615	435,252	280,724	264,629	176,109	309,464	463,008	476,916	283,419	230,366	287,517	326,370	4,023,389
2023	174,275	160,152	220,172	261,154	431,237	397,010	572,809	589,728	509,881	362,367	239,662	293,093	4,211,540
2024	660,934	318,463	165,707	180,279	259,343								

== See also ==
- List of power stations in Wisconsin
- Landfill solar
