= Fox Energy Center =

Electrical power station in Kaukauna, Outagamie County, Wisconsin

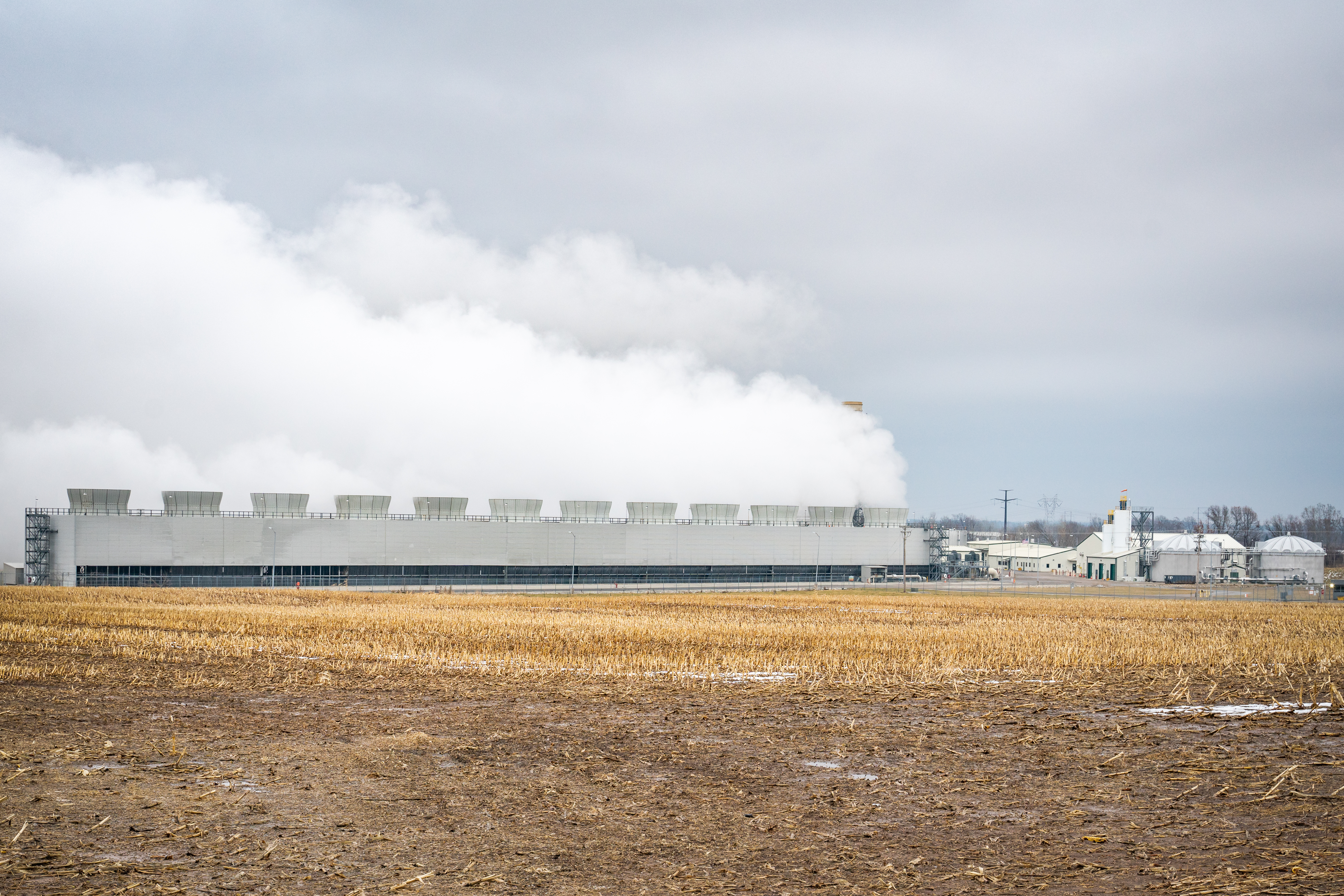
- Country: United States
- Location: Kaukauna, Wisconsin
- Coordinates: 44°19′14″N 88°12′33″W
- Status: Operational
- Commission date: 2005
- Owner: Wisconsin Public Service Corporation

Thermal power station
- Primary fuel: Natural gas
- Turbine technology: Steam turbine
- Cooling source: Fox River

Power generation
- Nameplate capacity: 618.8 MW

Fox Energy Center is a natural gas-fired, combined cycle electrical power station located in Kaukauna, Wisconsin in Outagamie County. The facility sits on property originally owned by Mid-America Corporation. The site was sold to Calpine Corporation around 2002. The original location slated for Fox Energy was located in Sherry, WI. Challenges with permitting for that location prompted Calpine to purchase the current location in Kaukauna, WI from Mid-America Corporation. In the spring of 2005, Calpine sold the facility to GE Energy Financial Services and entered a lease and operations and maintenance agreement with GE. In December 2005, Calpine filed bankruptcy and In October 2006, Calpine sold the O&M agreement to GE Energy Financial Services. GE Energy Financial Services then entered into an O&M agreement with GE Power in Atlanta, GA to hire the staff at Fox Energy and retain them to operate and maintain the facility.

In March 2013, GE Energy Financial Services sold the facility to Wisconsin Public Service for $440 million. WPS retained the O&M Agreement with GE Power through the balance of 2013. On January 1 of 2014, the employees at the facility were offered positions and transferred from GE Power to WPS. In July 2015, WPS was acquired by We Energies which formed WEC Energy Group. WPS and We Energies continue to exist as separate utilities operated under the WEC Energy Group umbrella.

Facility construction was managed by Calpine Construction Management Incorporated. Fox Unit 2 came into service in June 2005, with the capacity being sold to Wisconsin Public Service Corporation. under a power purchase agreement. Fox Unit 1 came into service in June 2006 after an additional capacity agreement between Calpine and WPS.

== Units ==
Units of Fox Energy Center
Unit	Capacity	Commissioning
1	198.9 MW	June 2006
2	198.9 MW	June 2005
Steam Unit	221 MW	June 2005

== See also ==
- List of power stations in Wisconsin
