= Valley Power Plant =

Electrical power station in Milwaukee, Wisconsin

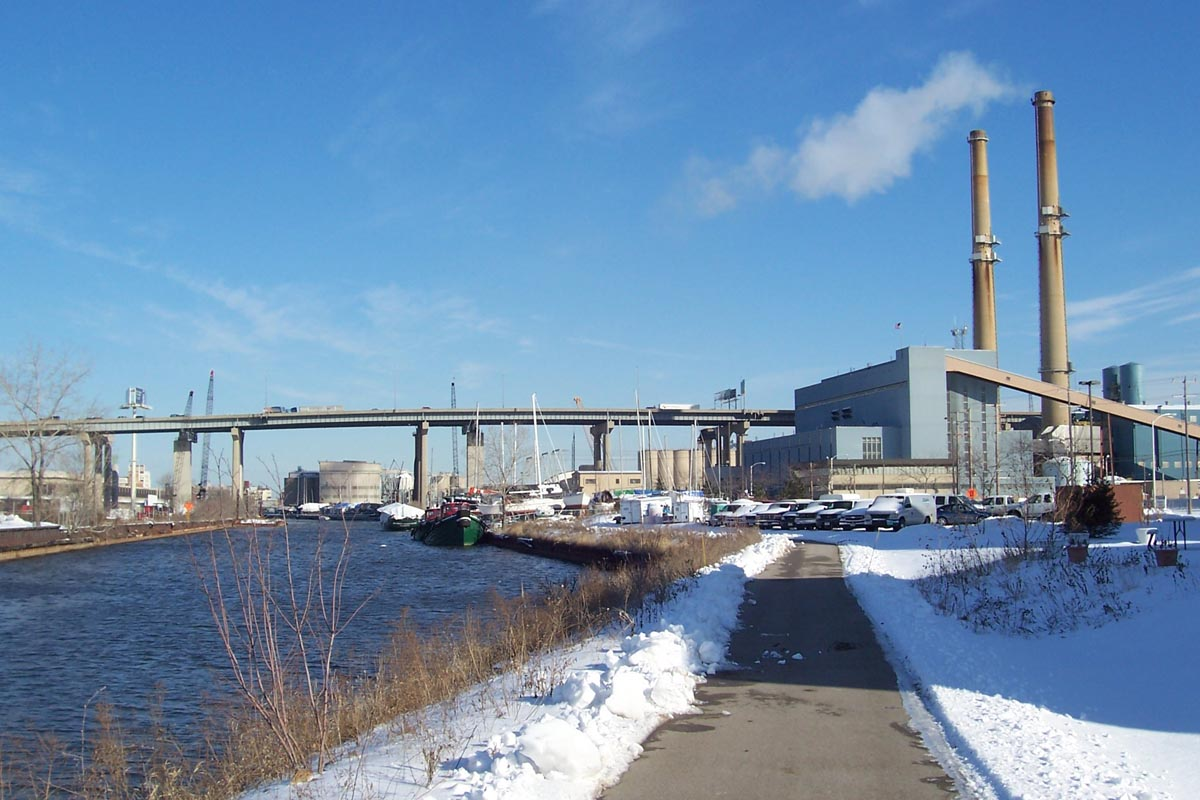
- Valley Power Plant (right)
- Country: United States
- Location: Milwaukee, Wisconsin
- Coordinates: 43°1′47″N 87°55′26″W
- Status: Operational
- Commission date: 1968 / 1969
- Owner: WE Energies

Thermal power station
- Primary fuel: Natural gas
- Turbine technology: Cogeneration
- Cooling source: Menomonee River

Power generation
- Units operational: Steam turbine
- Nameplate capacity: 280 MW

Valley Power Plant is an intermediate load, natural gas fired, electrical power station located in Milwaukee, Wisconsin. It is owned by We Energies. The plant is a cogeneration facility supplying steam to 480 customers and 280 MW of electricity.

== History ==
The plant was originally fueled by a pulverized coal and petroleum coke blend. Coal was shipped by boat to Milwaukee's Greenfield Avenue dock and then by barge to the plant. The plant completed its conversion to natural gas in late 2015.

== Units ==
Unit	Capacity	Commissioning	Notes
1	140 MW	1968	Steam / 2 Boilers
2	140 MW	1969	Steam / 2 Boilers

== See also ==
- List of power stations in Wisconsin
