= Peoples Energy =

Utility company for the Chicago area

- Logo of Peoples Gas
- Formerly: Peoples Gas Light & Coke Co.
- Type: Subsidiary
- Traded as: Nasdaq: WEC
- Industry: Natural gas production and supply
- Founded: 1849 in Chicago
- Headquarters: Milwaukee, Wisconsin
- Area served: City of Chicago
- Key people: Gale E. Klappa, CEO
- Owner: WEC Energy Group
- Members: 828,000 residential and business customers (2015)
- Subsidiaries: Peoples Gas; North Shore Gas Company
- Website: peoplesgasdelivery.com

Peoples Gas (short for The Peoples Gas Light and Coke Company) is a gas utility subsidiary of WEC Energy Group serving the city of Chicago, Illinois, and its northern suburbs.

== History ==
Established in 1849, in Chicago, Illinois, The Peoples Gas Light and Coke Company originally made and distributed water gas by forcing steam over hot coke. Peoples Gas grew to become the natural gas delivery supplier to approximately 830,000 residential, commercial, and industrial customers in Chicago. Peoples Gas has approximately 1,500 employees. Services provided to customers and maintenance of approximately 4,300 miles of natural gas main is the primary function of 850 field and support employees, represented by the Gas Workers Union, Local 18007.

In 1931, Chicago was connected with Texas via the Natural Gas Pipeline Company of America, a 980-mile natural gas pipeline, co-owned by Peoples.

Established in 1900, North Shore Natural Gas grew into the natural gas delivery supplier to approximately 158,000 residential, commercial, and industrial customers in 54 communities in the north-suburban area of Chicago in Lake County. In 1963 Peoples Gas purchased North Shore Gas.

In 1980, Peoples Gas changed its name to Peoples Energy Corporation.

In February 2007, the Peoples Energy Corporation merged with Green Bay, Wisconsin-based Wisconsin Public Service Corporation to form the Integrys Energy Group.

Other Integrys subsidiaries at the time included Peoples Energy Resources Company, LLC, Peoples Energy Services Corporation, Peoples Energy Production Company and Peoples District Energy Corporation, providing services in the oil and gas production, natural gas power generation, midstream services, and retail energy services industries. Integrys also owns and operates regulated and non-regulated energy businesses in Michigan, Minnesota and Wisconsin.

In February 2008, the Illinois Commerce Commission granted a controversial Peoples Gas/North Shore Gas request for a customer delivery rate increase. The approval, settled at $71 million, was expected to increase the average monthly customer gas bill by $7, or 4% to 5%. Peoples Gas/North Shore Gas, citing in part it had not filed for an increase in 12 years, initially sought a $102.5 million delivery rate increase in this proceeding.

In 2015, Integrys was acquired by, and became a subsidiary of WEC Energy Group. Peoples Gas continued as a separate operating unit of WEC.

== See also ==
- WEC Energy Group
