= Germantown Power Plant =

Electrical power station in Germantown, Washington County, Wisconsin

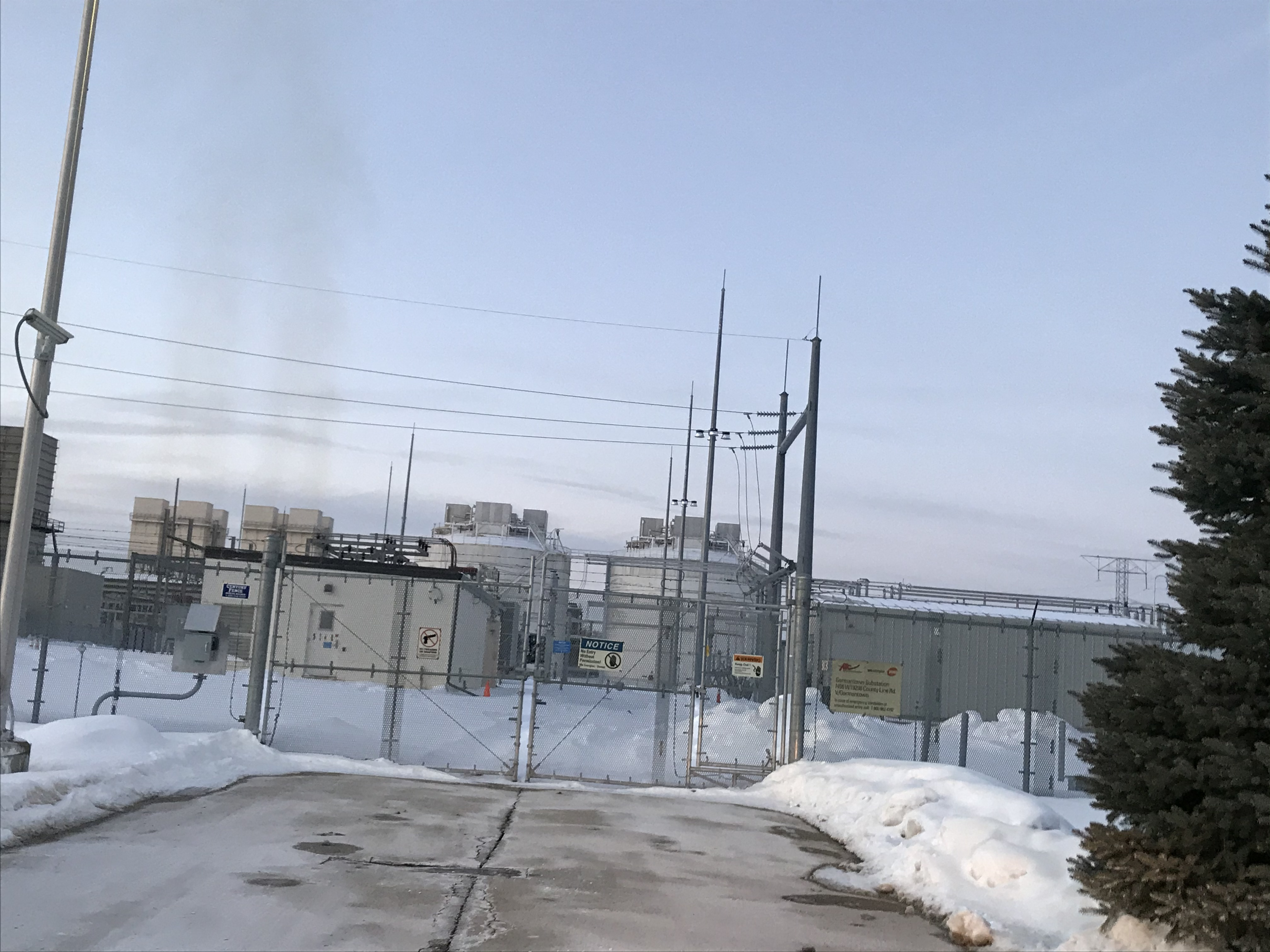
- Country: United States
- Location: Germantown, Wisconsin
- Coordinates: 43°11′46″N 88°9′1″W
- Status: Operational
- Commission date: 1978
- Owner: We Energies

Thermal power station
- Primary fuel: Natural gas
- Turbine technology: Steam turbine

Power generation
- Nameplate capacity: 345 MW

Germantown Power Plant is a natural gas fired, electrical peaking power plant located in Germantown, Wisconsin in Washington County. It is a five unit natural gas or #2 low sulfur fuel oil facility. Unit 5, which is powered by natural gas, is the primary unit, with the other four, powered by low sulfur fuel oil, being used during hours of peak energy usage. The plant was built in 1978 at a cost of $38 million. Natural gas capabilities were added in 2000. There is a 600,000 gallon storage tank on site for fuel, and natural gas is transported to the facility by pipeline.

== Units ==
Units of Germantown Power Plant
Unit	Capacity	Fuel Source	Commissioning
1	63 MW	Low sulfur fuel oil	1978
2	63 MW	Low sulfur fuel oil	1978
3	63 MW	Low sulfur fuel oil	1978
4	63 MW	Low sulfur fuel oil	1978
5	93 MW	Natural Gas	2000

== See also ==
- List of power stations in Wisconsin
