= Weston Generating Station =

Electrical power station in Marathon County, Wisconsin

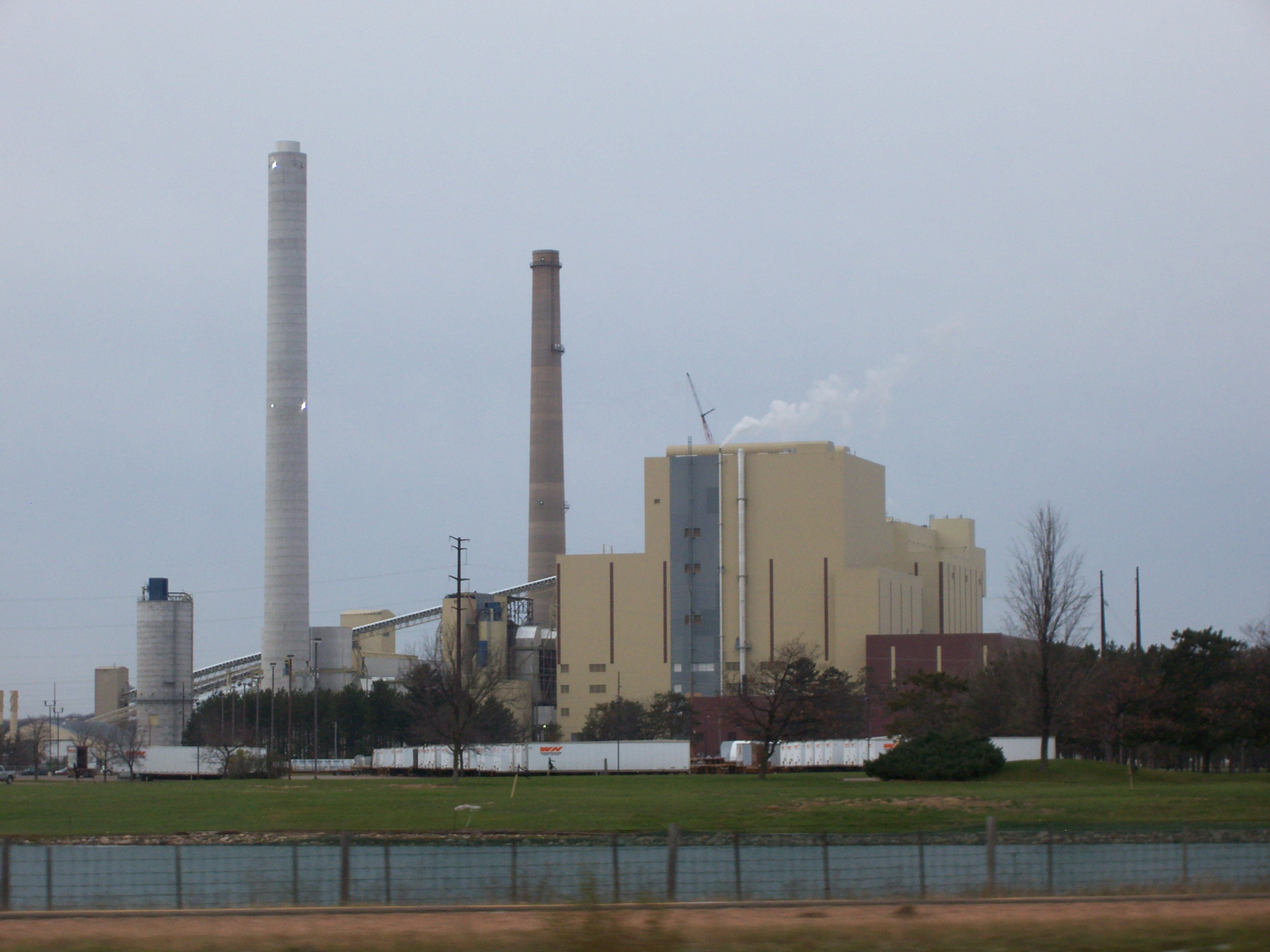
- Weston Power Plant in November 2007
- Country: United States
- Location: Rothschild & Kronenwetter, Wisconsin
- Coordinates: 44°51′31″N 89°38′59″W
- Status: Operational
- Commission date: 1954
- Owner: Wisconsin Public Service (WEC Energy Group)

Thermal power station
- Primary fuel: Sub-bituminous coal
- Cooling source: Unit 1 and 2:Wisconsin River; Unit 3 and 4:Cooling towers

Power generation
- Nameplate capacity: 1,076 MW (net, summer)
- Capacity factor: 50.75 (2021)
- Annual net output: 4767 GWh (2021)

The Weston Generating Station, also known as the Weston Power Plant, is a base load, coal fired, electrical power station located in the villages of Rothschild and Kronenwetter in Marathon County, Wisconsin, United States. In 2009, it was listed as the fifth largest generating station in Wisconsin, with a net summer capacity of 1,076 MW. It is owned by Wisconsin Public Service, a subsidiary of WEC Energy Group.

This plant is connected to the power grid via numerous 115 kV and 345 kV lines, owned by American Transmission Company. In February 2008 the Arrowhead-Weston 345,000-volt transmission line was completed, allowing more power to be transmitted between Duluth, Minnesota, The Stone Lake Substation, and the Gardener Park Substation, near the Weston plant. Also, an additional 345,000-volt transmission line was completed between the Gardener Park Substation and the Highway 22 Substation, 5 miles southwest of Shawano. An existing line also provides power to the Rocky Run substation west of Stevens Point, Allowing High Voltage transmission of electricity across Wisconsin.

In 1954, Weston 1 began operations as the first unit of the Weston Plant. Six years later in 1960, Weston 2 began operations at the Weston Power Plant, becoming the second coal-fired unit on site. Later, in 1981, Weston 3 was commissioned as the third, much larger, more efficient coal-fired unit, and continues to operate today. In 2008, Weston 4 began operating as the plants largest unit, and continues to operate as Weston's dominant unit today. Unit 1 was retired in 2015, while Unit 2 was switched to natural gas. In 2023, Weston 2 ceased operations permanently. As of 2024, Weston units 1 and 2 have been fully demolished.

In 2022, work began on a new natural gas-fired RICE (Reciprocating Internal Combustion Engine) generating facility on the Weston Power Plant Site, and was commissioned in 2023. The new RICE facility was built as a peaking facility, providing power in high-demand periods. Weston's RICE generating station includes 7 gas-fired engines, with a nameplate capacity of 128 MW total. The Rice Facilities ownership is split 50/50 between WEC energy group subsidiaries WPS and We Energies.

Between November 2016 and April 2020, the plant consumed on average 196,670 tons of coal per month, or approximately 6,500 tons daily. As of 2026, it is estimated that the plant causes 11 deaths per year due to soot and smog pollution.

== Units ==
Unit	Capacity (MW)	Commissioning	Notes
1	60 (nameplate); 59.8 (summer); 60.4 (winter)	1954	
2	81.6 (nameplate); 81.5 (summer); 82.5 (winter)	1960	
3	350.5 (nameplate); 333.1 (summer); 336.3 (winter)	1981	
4	595 (nameplate); 537 (summer); 537 (winter)	2008	

== Electricity production ==
In 2021, the Weston Generating Station generated 4,767 GWh, approximately 7.6% of the total electric power generated in Wisconsin (62,584 GWh) for that year. The plant had a 2021 annual capacity factor of 50.75%.

Generation (MW-h) of Weston Generating Station
Year	Jan	Feb	Mar	Apr	May	Jun	Jul	Aug	Sep	Oct	Nov	Dec	Annual (Total)
2001	297,762	290,911	85,476	193,123	252,182	261,996	305,717	306,394	251,056	326,714	289,105	308,822	3,169,258
2002	258,753	265,214	288,181	291,317	271,133	187,606	300,717	304,954	265,132	271,051	261,525	237,005	3,202,588
2003	303,803	288,459	323,537	300,405	179,679	175,037	300,127	300,175	283,777	312,480	287,812	318,808	3,374,099
2004	321,940	292,343	298,091	282,538	204,553	197,803	305,358	303,237	305,941	322,007	308,465	318,971	3,461,247
2005	321,248	282,783	332,162	309,781	294,337	303,120	309,226	307,259	238,149	257,252	288,289	324,617	3,568,223
2006	279,711	280,380	275,444	292,284	309,846	300,413	289,361	294,324	234,947	293,887	271,565	293,360	3,415,522
2007	318,045	252,006	273,785	127,557	216,955	302,042	333,060	323,189	283,801	137,690	81,349	102,526	2,752,005
2008	220,229	293,320	305,904	273,132	275,442	213,364	550,314	632,574	454,969	463,006	391,844	389,679	4,463,777
2009	616,634	490,879	358,312	287,284	552,343	469,652	694,298	410,874	472,510	438,026	622,742	667,109	6,080,663
2010	620,895	619,573	653,475	452,645	605,900	614,973	631,520	616,699	536,567	446,281	400,222	606,572	6,805,322
2011	593,679	446,690	548,707	491,307	465,753	460,855	622,897	583,530	422,129	432,831	446,238	517,114	6,031,730
2012	376,170	337,763	334,409	298,095	260,525	577,384	610,553	502,764	378,085	442,863	418,381	432,627	4,969,619
2013	567,949	531,496	593,101	513,014	432,033	505,748	553,781	521,803	500,792	307,204	426,017	633,144	6,086,082
2014	639,057	484,449	369,030	344,055	189,328	472,005	513,605	515,520	373,732	349,600	393,042	370,052	5,013,475
2015	465,608	493,389	505,775	291,086	259,339	343,160	526,141	508,589	432,888	196,732	82,613	308,315	4,413,635
2016	436,700	421,215	261,864	296,184	306,403	256,090	326,160	286,730	357,051	389,694	306,950	160,711	3,805,752
2017	251,517	322,618	309,688	370,074	298,877	410,675	490,048	415,673	394,701	454,698	240,849	339,992	4,299,410
2018	485,204	331,841	269,895	328,883	157,233	383,160	464,672	494,217	386,278	378,342	416,168	525,243	4,621,136
2019	466,962	386,350	491,544	323,301	332,037	353,328	454,107	429,509	329,435	232,056	264,122	346,266	4,409,017
2020	315,759	281,180	392,146	399,664	358,899	448,163	517,322	404,962	306,624	285,086	141,057	246,418	4,097,280
2021	414,024	461,947	196,119	288,826	404,081	417,938	483,719	575,778	392,163	446,985	301,412	383,852	4,766,844
2022	536,449	412,570	324,267	307,421	402,564	395,610	456,521	422,598	300,466	232,890			3,791,356
2023													

Sub-notes:

(1) : Table data reflects electrical generation from all fuels (subbituminous coal, refined coal, distillate fuel oil, and natural gas). Monthly natural gas generation represents on average 1.2% of total generation.

(2) : Major fuel switched from subbituminous coal to refined coal in November 2016

== See also ==
- List of power stations in Wisconsin
