= Edgewater Generating Station =

Coal power plant in Sheboygan, Wisconsin

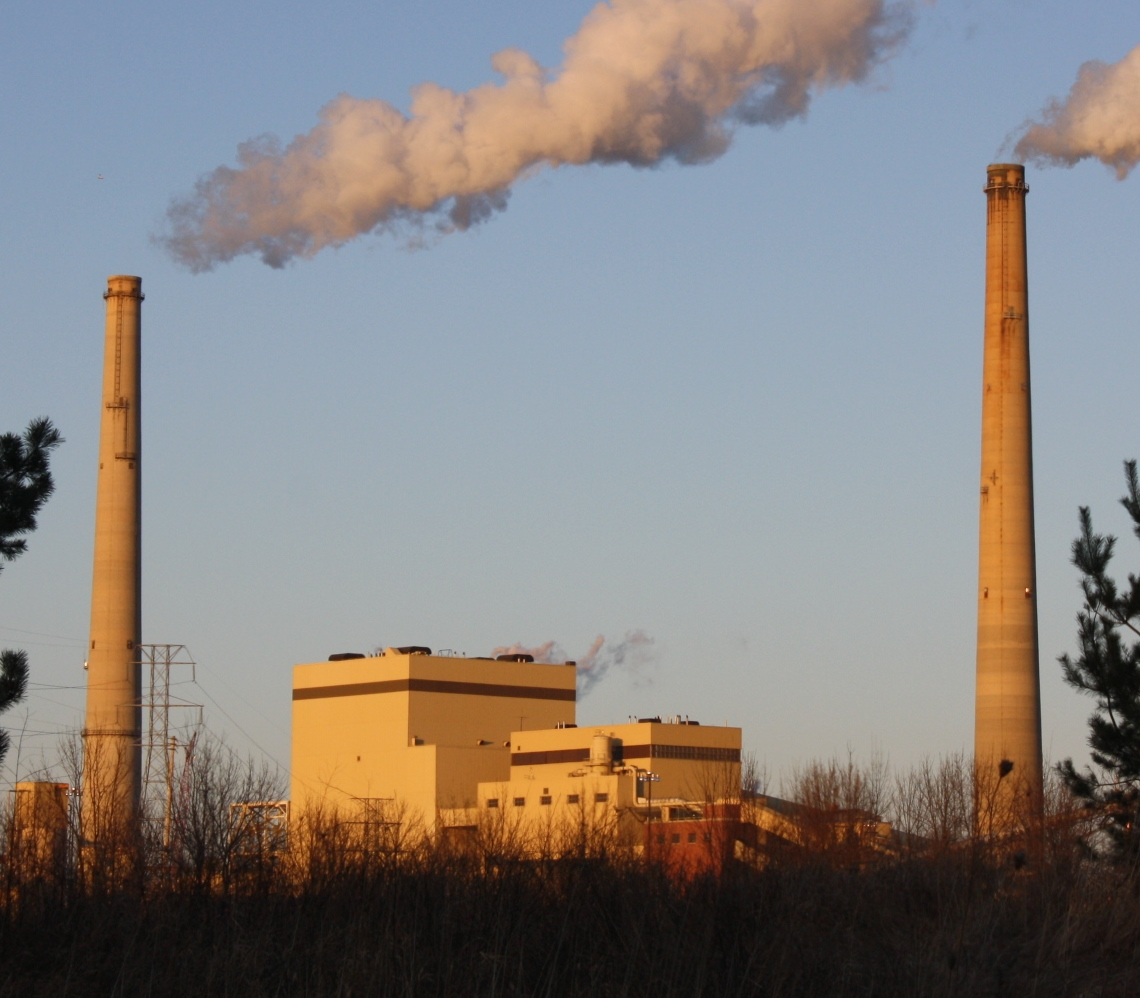
- Country: United States
- Location: Sheboygan, Wisconsin
- Coordinates: 43°42′56″N 87°42′23″W
- Status: Operational
- Commission date: Unit 1: 1931; Unit 2: 1941; Unit 3: 1951; Unit 4: 1969; Unit 5: 1985
- Decommission date: Unit 3: 2015; Unit 4: 2018
- Owners: Alliant Energy (majority); WEC Energy Group (minority)

Thermal power station
- Primary fuel: Coal
- Turbine technology: Steam turbine
- Cooling source: Lake Michigan

Power generation
- Nameplate capacity: 380 MW
- Capacity factor: 69.41% (2021)
- Annual net output: 2311 (2021)

External links
- Commons: Related media on Commons

Edgewater Generating Station is a 380 megawatt (MW) coal power plant located on the south side of Sheboygan, Wisconsin, on the shore of Lake Michigan, whose waters are used to provide cooling. It provides electricity for customers in the northeastern part of Alliant Energy's Wisconsin Power & Light service area and service to several local municipal utilities. In 2009, it was the seventh largest generating station in Wisconsin, with a net summer capacity of 767 MW.

== Units ==
Unit	Capacity (MW)	Commissioning	Notes
1	30	1931	Retired
2	30	1941	Retired
3	60 (nameplate); 70.8 (summer); 71.7 (winter)	1951	Retired Cyclone Boiler 844 million British thermal units per hour (247 MW)
4	330 (nameplate); 320.4 (summer); 320.7 (winter)	1969	Retired Cyclone Boiler; 3,529 million British thermal units per hour (1,034 MW)
5	380 (nameplate); 413.6 (summer); 414.3 (winter)	1985	Pulverized Dry Bottom Boiler; 4,366 million British thermal units per hour (1,280 MW)

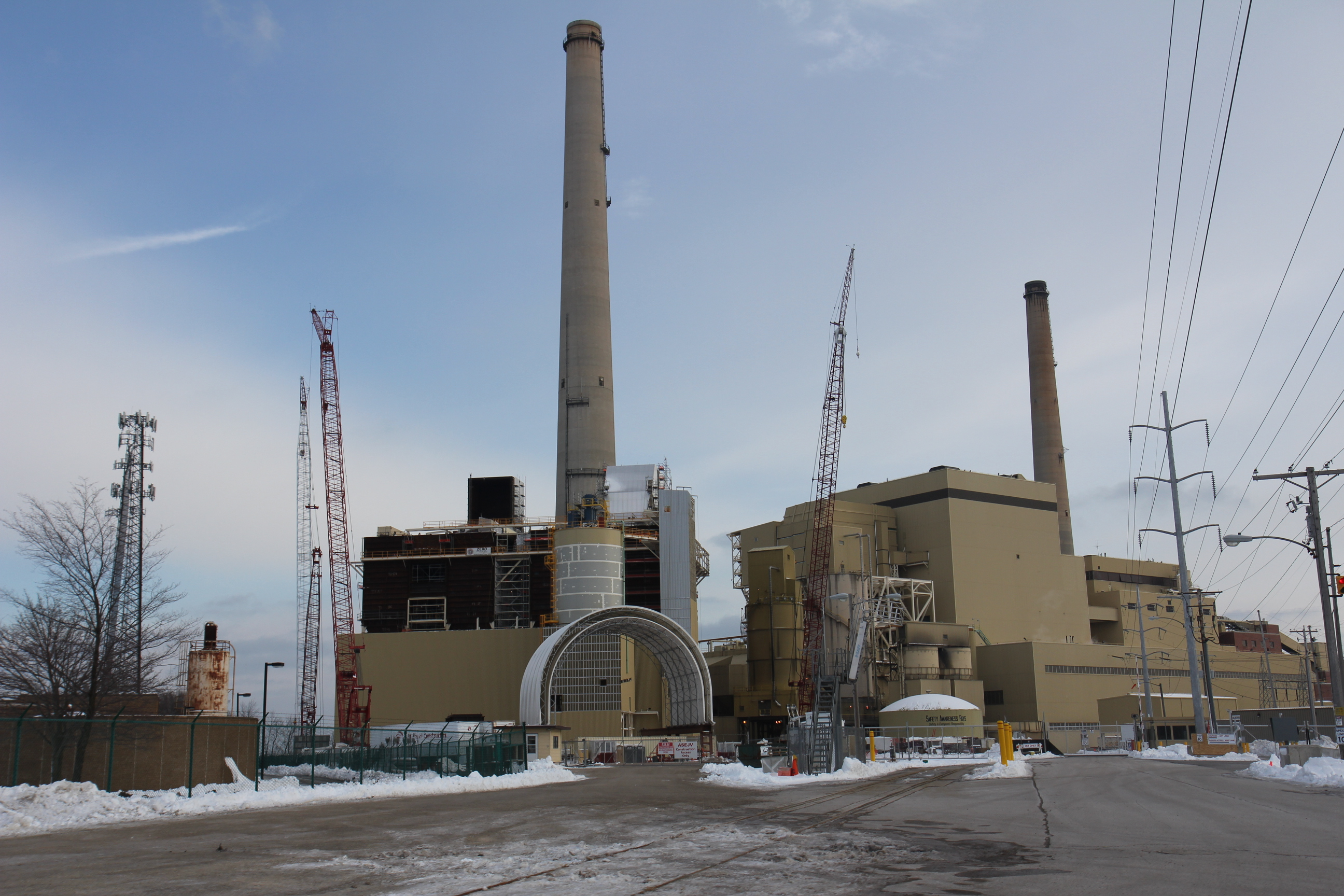
2016 construction

In 1952 one of the units was upgraded with a Babcock & Wilcox cyclone boiler. At the time, the facility was using a 50/50 mix of Illinois and West Virginia coal. The West Virginia coal was shipped via lake freighter from Lorain, Ohio.

At present, coal is delivered to the plant entirely by railroad, originating primarily from the Powder River Basin in Wyoming, via a Union Pacific spur line that was originally the main line of the Milwaukee Northern interurban railway.

Unit 3 and 4 share the same chimney.

Unit 3 turbine and generator were manufactured by Allis-Chalmers. Unit 4 was manufactured by General Electric, with an Alterrex excitation system. Unit 5 was also manufactured by General Electric, with a Generrex excitation system.

== Public health ==
As of 2026, it is estimated that the plant causes 10 deaths per year due to soot and smog pollution.

== Retirement and decommissioning ==
Unit 3 was retired at the end of 2015 due to its age and efficiency. Unit 4 was retired in 2018 as Alliant Energy worked to reduce 80 percent of carbon dioxide emissions by 2050. Unit 4's electricity generation would be replaced by Riverside Energy Center in the Town of Beloit, which uses natural gas.

On May 22, 2020, Alliant Energy announced that the plant would be decommissioned by the end of 2022, and the property would be redeveloped for another use; Unit 5's generating capacity has also been replaced by a further expansion of Riverside. On June 23, 2022, Alliant announced that Edgewater's decommissioning date would be delayed until June 2025, due to the ongoing supply chain issues and to hedge against an energy shortage in upcoming years, with Edgewater mainly being in service during peak periods. The utility also plans a 99 MW battery by 2024.

On December 4, 2024, Alliant Energy announced another delay to decommission the plant by extending coal operation through 2029

== Electricity generation ==
In 2021, Edgewater generated 2,311 GWh, approximately 3.7% of the total electric power generated in Wisconsin (62,584 GWh) for that year. The plant had a 2021 annual capacity factor of 69.41%.

Electrical Generation (MW-h) of Edgewater Generation Station
Year	Jan	Feb	Mar	Apr	May	Jun	Jul	Aug	Sep	Oct	Nov	Dec	Annual (Total)
2001	421,123	444,173	446,782	261,305	290,120	404,445	432,472	488,116	349,327	449,850	422,409	434,451	4,844,573
2002	453,762	399,382	273,143	306,503	389,155	419,313	490,968	429,073	407,380	408,755	390,591	418,889	4,786,914
2003	298,900	456,077	299,103	455,488	439,803	396,437	466,353	473,587	353,381	399,188	436,408	419,095	4,893,820
2004	462,658	251,202	269,249	343,218	411,550	436,325	479,183	445,972	419,681	442,563	377,296	420,811	4,759,708
2005	468,022	392,173	383,075	396,735	346,578	398,064	288,539	318,025	307,563	287,223	327,345	381,344	4,294,686
2006	264,155	296,154	370,761	366,110	439,882	399,024	466,530	413,755	395,309	239,629	255,995	373,906	4,281,210
2007	468,131	452,671	462,173	364,453	224,700	335,228	403,344	428,599	362,483	436,604	408,099	399,996	4,746,481
2008	422,307	396,314	442,794	262,068	392,238	373,217	425,015	418,498	366,491	314,885	391,390	412,731	4,617,948
2009	450,697	332,405	290,450	251,222	245,074	344,625	332,379	377,838	322,644	404,683	322,968	413,297	4,088,282
2010	380,309	394,406	378,866	248,360	409,800	400,273	435,301	446,457	335,137	285,028	229,764	370,602	4,314,303
2011	471,011	418,396	448,811	302,188	416,251	375,186	463,703	415,892	283,651	263,322	206,532	287,278	4,352,221
2012	299,981	317,445	329,228	154,216	210,855	277,757	431,796	379,885	225,366	189,953	409,706	371,978	3,598,166
2013	347,716	246,618	452,454	461,179	402,119	334,988	409,965	327,280	326,578	315,452	273,330	388,779	4,286,458
2014	473,681	429,938	308,447	279,513	420,498	306,300	288,260	358,408	295,287	166,454	130,588	375,306	3,832,680
2015	348,636	345,026	350,291	219,023	273,780	403,928	431,148	415,972	379,936	292,263	223,580	213,070	3,896,653
2016	338,132	267,699	209,270	139,597	89,497	237,499	402,795	405,067	393,203	306,100	260,727	405,555	3,455,141
2017	377,088	258,211	390,717	363,260	255,978	297,976	357,816	308,822	289,053	190,570	331,404	370,470	3,791,365
2018	423,054	277,386	146,403	163,447	341,841	326,402	363,800	381,631	298,854	200,432	258,936	104,872	3,287,058
2019	140,467	168,126	210,449	145,382	125,299	103,080	174,504	123,913	116,911	37,063	81,928	0	1,427,122
2020	146,803	120,837	-2,701	16,514	30,030	76,862	146,823	168,253	137,064	23,534	30,725	203,681	1,098,425
2021	192,029	197,050	180,292	181,104	233,594	247,443	276,939	258,081	164,304	136,895	183,162	59,655	2,310,548
2022	219,316	243,263	239,971	145,335	109,838	119,621	231,759	188,331	157,779	27,466			1,682,679
2023													

== See also ==
- Alliant Energy
- List of power stations in Wisconsin
