= Port Washington Generating Station =

Electrical power station in Port Washington, Ozaukee County, Wisconsin

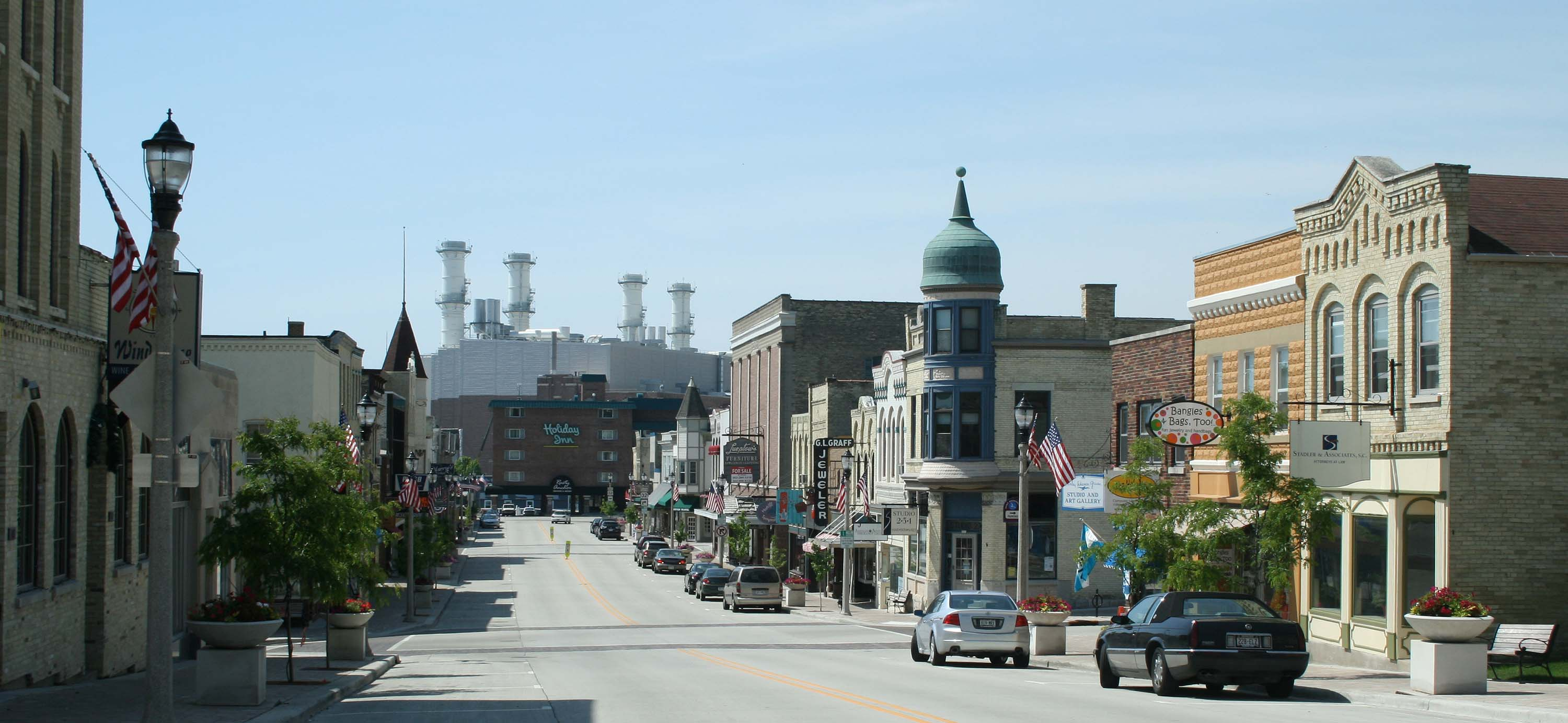
- Country: United States
- Location: Port Washington, Wisconsin
- Coordinates: 43°23′05″N 87°52′12″W
- Status: Operational
- Commission date: Unit 1: July 16, 2005; Unit 2: May, 2008
- Owner: WE Energies

Thermal power station
- Primary fuel: Natural gas
- Turbine technology: two combustion turbine-generators and one steam-turbine generator per unit
- Cooling source: Lake Michigan
- Combined cycle?: Yes

Power generation
- Units operational: GE Gas turbine
- Nameplate capacity: Unit 1: 545 megawatts Unit 2: 545 megawatts

Port Washington Generating Station is an intermediate-load, natural gas fired, electrical power station located on Lake Michigan in Port Washington, Wisconsin. The natural gas facility replaced an older coal-fired station in the early 2000s. This station has two units with the first being completed in July 2005 and produces 545 MW. The second unit was completed in May 2008 and also produces 545 MW.

== See also ==
- List of power stations in Wisconsin
