= West Campus Cogeneration Facility =

Electrical power station in Madison, Dane County, Wisconsin

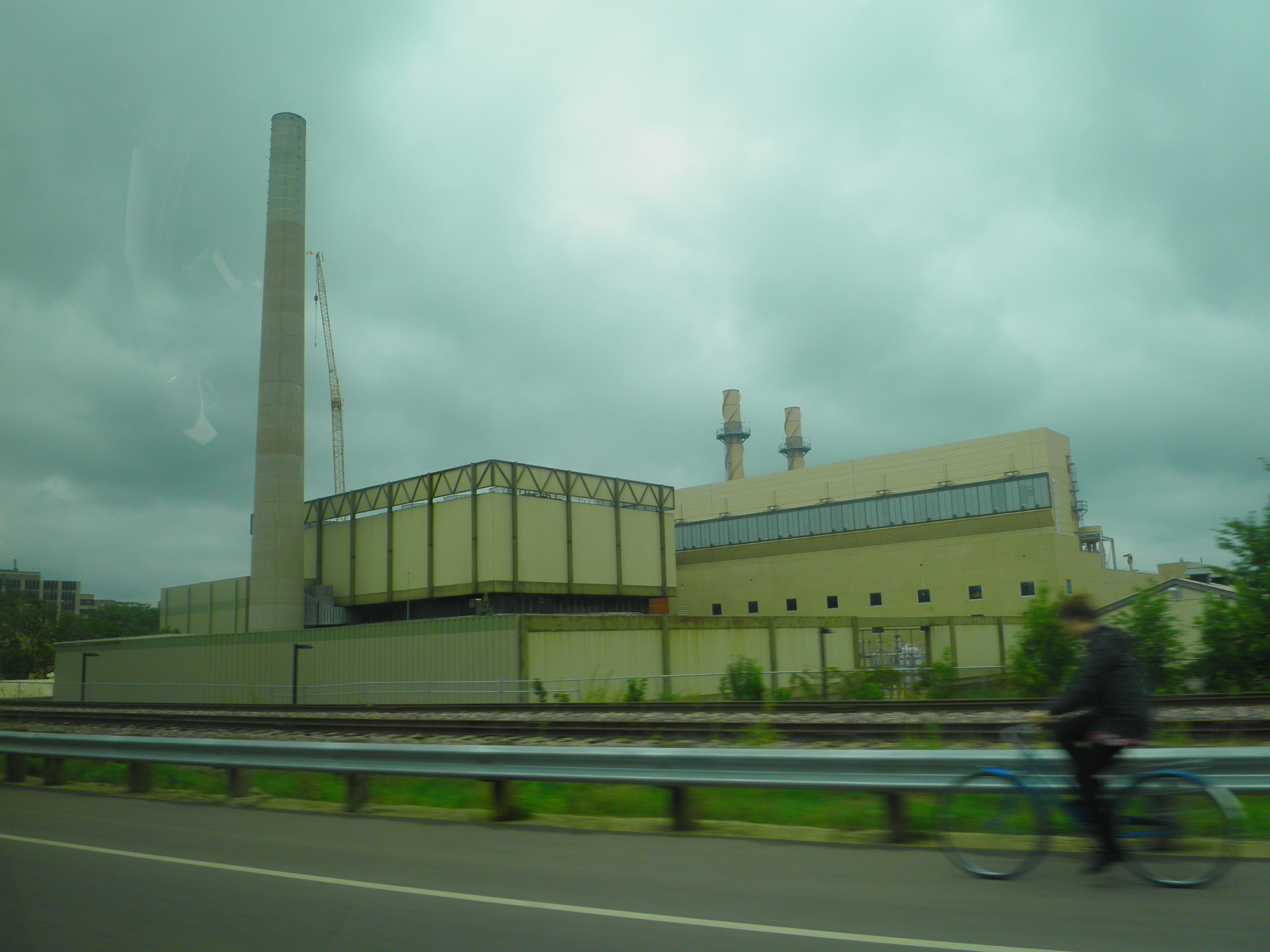
- Country: United States
- Location: Madison, Wisconsin
- Coordinates: 43°4′30″N 89°25′26″W
- Status: Operational
- Commission date: 2005
- Owners: Madison Gas and Electric and University of Wisconsin-Madison

Thermal power station
- Primary fuel: Natural gas
- Turbine technology: Steam turbine
- Cooling source: Lake Mendota

Power generation
- Nameplate capacity: 150 MW

West Campus Cogeneration Facility is a natural gas fired, electrical power station located in Madison, Wisconsin in Dane County. The facility is owned jointly by Madison Gas and Electric and the University of Wisconsin-Madison, with Madison Gas and Electric operating and maintaining the facility. It provides electricity to Madison Gas and Electric, and steam heat and chilled-water air-conditioning to the University of Wisconsin-Madison campus.

== See also ==
- List of power stations in Wisconsin
