= RockGen Energy Center =

Natural gas fired peaking power plant in Wisconsin, United States

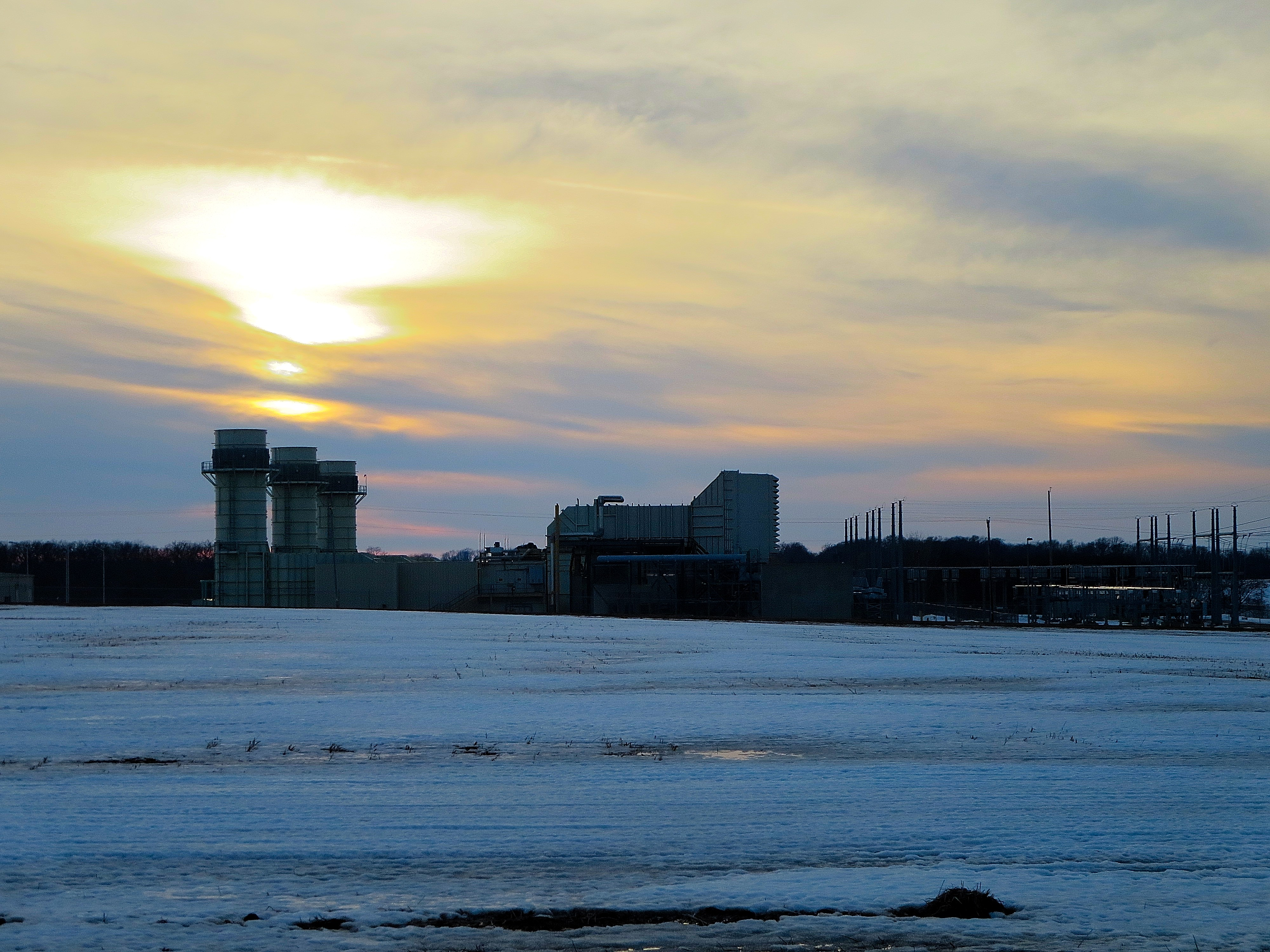
- Country: United States
- Location: Town of Christiana, Dane County, Wisconsin
- Coordinates: 42°58′37″N 89°2′55″W
- Status: Operational
- Commission date: May 2001
- Owner: Dairyland Power Cooperative

Thermal power station
- Primary fuel: Natural gas or fuel oil
- Turbine technology: GE Gas turbine

Power generation
- Units operational: 3
- Nameplate capacity: 503 megawatts (MW)

External links
- Commons: Related media on Commons

RockGen Energy Center is a 503-megawatt (MW) natural gas fired peaking power plant located near Cambridge, Wisconsin. According to Calpine, it was the largest peaking plant in Wisconsin at the time it was constructed.

== Construction ==
In July 1998, the town of Christiana was announced as one of the possible sites for a new peaker plant in Wisconsin. The site is just east of a limestone quarry and west of a large electrical substation on land previously used for row crop farming. Shortly after the announcement, an opposition group named "Responsible Use of Rural and Agricultural Land" (RURAL) was formed to block its construction. Other sites were ruled out as more expensive and the decision was made to proceed at the Dane county location west of Rockdale. Starting in January 1999, several lawsuits were filed by RURAL and the village of Rockdale to block the construction and invalidate the air permit. The Environmental Protection Agency declined to overturn the Wisconsin Department of Natural Resources issued air permit. In March 2000, tensions were high and gunshots were fired at a nearby electrical substation damaging a transformer and circuit breaker. No one was ever charged in the incident, but it was considered to be connected to the construction dispute by police. Construction began in April 2000, ten months behind schedule. In December 2000, the Wisconsin Supreme Court ended the remaining challenge allowing construction to finish. In May 2001, the $190 million facility was completed.

Around the same time period, the announcement of plans for generating stations near Edgerton (just south of the Dane / Rock county line) and Sturtevant in Racine County, "generated huge public outcry." Those plans were quickly scrapped and as of 2008, no other power plants have been constructed in Dane County. Calpine would later construct Riverside Energy Center, a larger base load, combined cycle natural gas-fired plant farther south in Rock County in the town of Beloit.

== Operation ==
The facility began operation May 2001. In February 2003, there was a fire that placed one of the turbines temporarily out of service. The fire was caused by a high pressure air line breaking loose and catching insulation on fire. It was extinguished by plant workers with a hand-held extinguisher and local emergency crews responded without lights or sirens.

In 2021, Dairyland Power Cooperative announced its intention to acquire RockGen Energy Center. The acquisition was finalized in Dec. 2021.

== Chapter 11 ==
Natural gas prices, note the increase after construction in 2001 that affected profitability of the project.

Starting in 2006, the continued operation of the facility was in doubt due to the Chapter 11 filing by parent company Calpine. CIT Group, one of Calpine's creditors, took control of the facility and considered closing it in 2007, but it remained operational through the peak generating season.

== See also ==
- List of power stations in Wisconsin
