= Integrys Energy Group =

Former American energy company

- Industry: Energy
- Founded: 2007
- Defunct: June 15, 2015
- Successor: WEC Energy Group
- Headquarters: Aon Center; Chicago, Illinois, United States
- Area served: Illinois; Michigan; Minnesota; Wisconsin
- Key people: Charles A Schrock (CEO)
- Products: Natural Gas, Electricity
- Number of employees: 5,025
- Subsidiaries: Integrys Energy Services; Michigan Gas Utilities; Minnesota Energy Resources; North Shore Gas; Peoples Gas; Upper Peninsula Power Company; Wisconsin Public Service

Integrys Energy Group, Inc. was an American energy company headquartered in Chicago, Illinois. It was formed by the merger of WPS Resources Corp. and Peoples Energy Corp. on February 21, 2007. The chairman, President, and chief executive officer was Charles A. Schrock. On June 23, 2014, Integrys announced that it was being acquired by Wisconsin Energy Corporation for $9.1 billion. Also in 2014, Integrys entered into an agreement to sell 100% of the Upper Peninsula Power Company (UPPCO) to Balfour Beatty Infrastructure Partners LP for $298.9 million.

== Utilities ==
The six regulated utilities consisted of:

- The Peoples Gas Light and Coke Company, a natural gas utility serving approximately 873,000 customers in the City of Chicago.
- Wisconsin Public Service Corporation, an electric and natural gas utility serving approximately 446,000 electric customers and 330,000 natural gas customers in northeast and central Wisconsin.
- Minnesota Energy Resources Corporation, a natural gas utility serving approximately 238,000 customers throughout Minnesota.
- Michigan Gas Utilities Corporation, a natural gas utility serving approximately 176,000 customers in lower Michigan.
- North Shore Gas Company, a natural gas utility serving approximately 162,000 customers in the northern suburbs of Chicago.
- Upper Peninsula Power Company, an electric utility serving approximately 52,000 customers in Michigan's Upper Peninsula. Note: Integrys announced its intention to sell Upper Peninsula Power to Balfour Beatty Infrastructure Partners LP on 20 January 2014.

== Subsidiaries ==
The company's other subsidiaries were:

- Integrys Business Support, Integrys Energy Group's business services company — providing services and solutions for operation of Integrys' subsidiaries.
- Integrys Energy Services, Inc., a diversified nonregulated energy supply and services company serving residential, commercial, industrial, and wholesale customers in developed competitive markets in the United States.
- Integrys Transportation Fuels, with compressed natural gas fueling stations operating across the United States under the brand name Trillium CNG.

== Criticism ==
In December 2011, the non-partisan organization Public Campaign criticized Integrys Energy Group for spending $710,000 on lobbying and not paying any taxes during 2008–2010, instead receiving $92 million in tax rebates, despite making a profit of $818 million and increasing executive pay by 109% to $14.8 million in 2010 for its top 5 executives.
