= Oneida Street Station =

- U.S. National Register of Historic Places
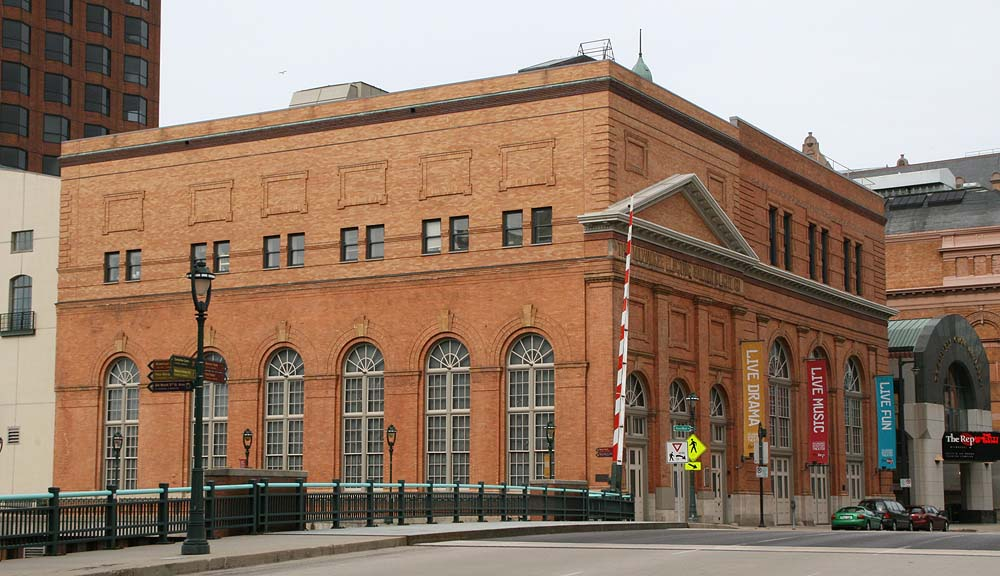
- Oneida Street Station

- Location within Wisconsin Location within the United States
- Location: 108 E. Wells St. Milwaukee, Wisconsin
- Coordinates: 43°2′28″N 87°54′41″W
- Area: less than one acre
- Built: 1900
- Architect: Herman Esser
- Architectural style: Neoclassical revival
- NRHP reference No.: 84000701
- Added to NRHP: December 6, 1984

Oneida Street Station, also known as the East Wells Power Plant, was a power plant operated by The Milwaukee Electric Railway & Light Company. Constructed from 1898 to 1900, it was designed by architect Herman Esser in neoclassical revival style. The building is located in downtown Milwaukee, Wisconsin, at the Milwaukee River and Wells Street, which was once known as Oneida Street. The company began operating electric street cars in 1890. Their expanding network of streetcar and interurban railway lines were powered by several of their own power plants. As the company generated more power than they used, they sold the excess electricity, and, as Wisconsin Energy Corporation, eventually became the major supplier of power to eastern Wisconsin. The American Society of Mechanical Engineers (ASME) describes the plant as the "first central power station in the United States to be equipped and successfully operated with pulverized coal."

The oldest building of the complex is the machine shop and boiler room #2, designed by E. Townsend Mix and built in 1890 for the Edison Illuminating Company. In 1896 the company and building were merged into the Milwaukee Electric Railway and Light Company. In 1900 TMER&L built the Oneida Street Plant just south of the old Edison building. Boiler room #3 was added north of the Edison building in 1923 and 1925. Boiler room #4 was added in 1938.

From 1918 to 1920, the plant was the site of pioneering experiments into the use of pulverized coal-fired boilers. The chief engineer for the company directed experiments to determine whether pulverized coal would conserve fuel and reduced the cost of electrical power. This change was seen as controversial, and was opposed by many engineers. However, pulverized coal was determined to be much more efficient than stoker firing in the central station boilers. In addition to the change in the coal, a "water screen" was developed to reduce the temperature of the waste ash, to prevent it from fusing as slag on the floor of the boiler. Soon, boilers all over the country began using pulverized coal, due to the greater efficiency of the process. For this, the site is recognized as a National Historic Mechanical Engineering Landmark, in 1980, by the American Society of Mechanical Engineers.

The building was added to the National Register of Historic places in 1984. However, the power plant was decommissioned and the building was renovated in 1987. The building currently houses the Associated Bank Theater Center and the Milwaukee Repertory Theater.
