= Richland Electric Cooperative =

Richland Electric Cooperative is an electric distribution cooperative located in Richland Center, Wisconsin. Richland Electric Cooperative serves approximately 3500 members with electric service throughout Richland County, Wisconsin and parts of Sauk, Vernon, and Crawford counties as well.

The cooperative was formed on January 8, 1936 as the Richland Cooperative Electric Association as the result of the Rural Electrification Administration order issued by President Franklin D. Roosevelt in 1935. It was the first electricity cooperative in the state. The co-op first provided electricity was on May 7, 1937. The farmhouse had been wired for electricity when it was built in the 1917, but had no power grid with which to connect.

== See also ==
- Dairyland Power Cooperative
