= Wisconsin Public Service Corporation =

American energy company

Wisconsin Public Service
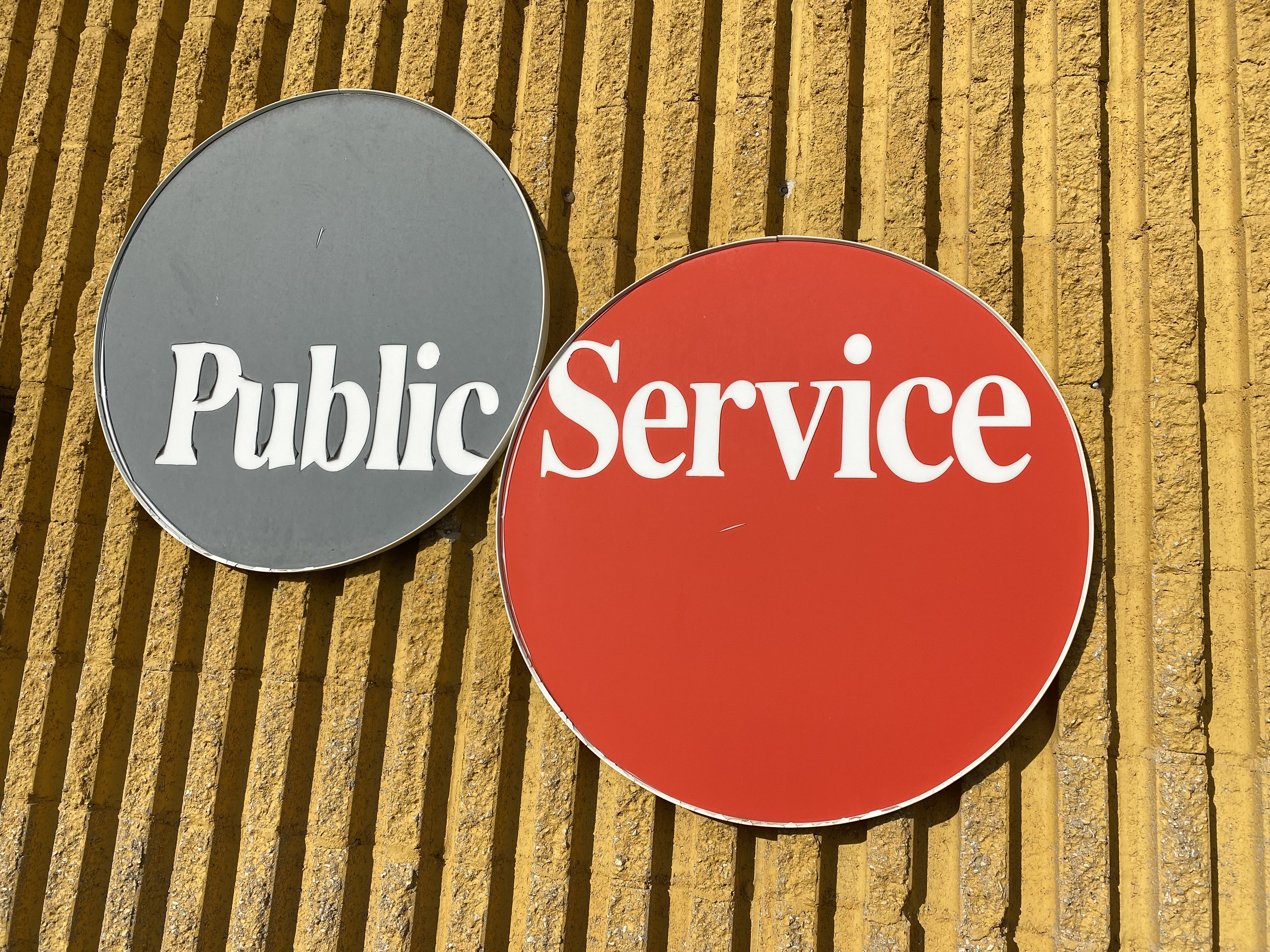
- Formerly: Oshkosh Gas Light Company
- Company type: Public
- Industry: Energy
- Founded: 1922; 104 years ago
- Headquarters: Green Bay, Wisconsin
- Area served: Wisconsin
- Services: Electricity; Gas; Steam
- Website: Official website

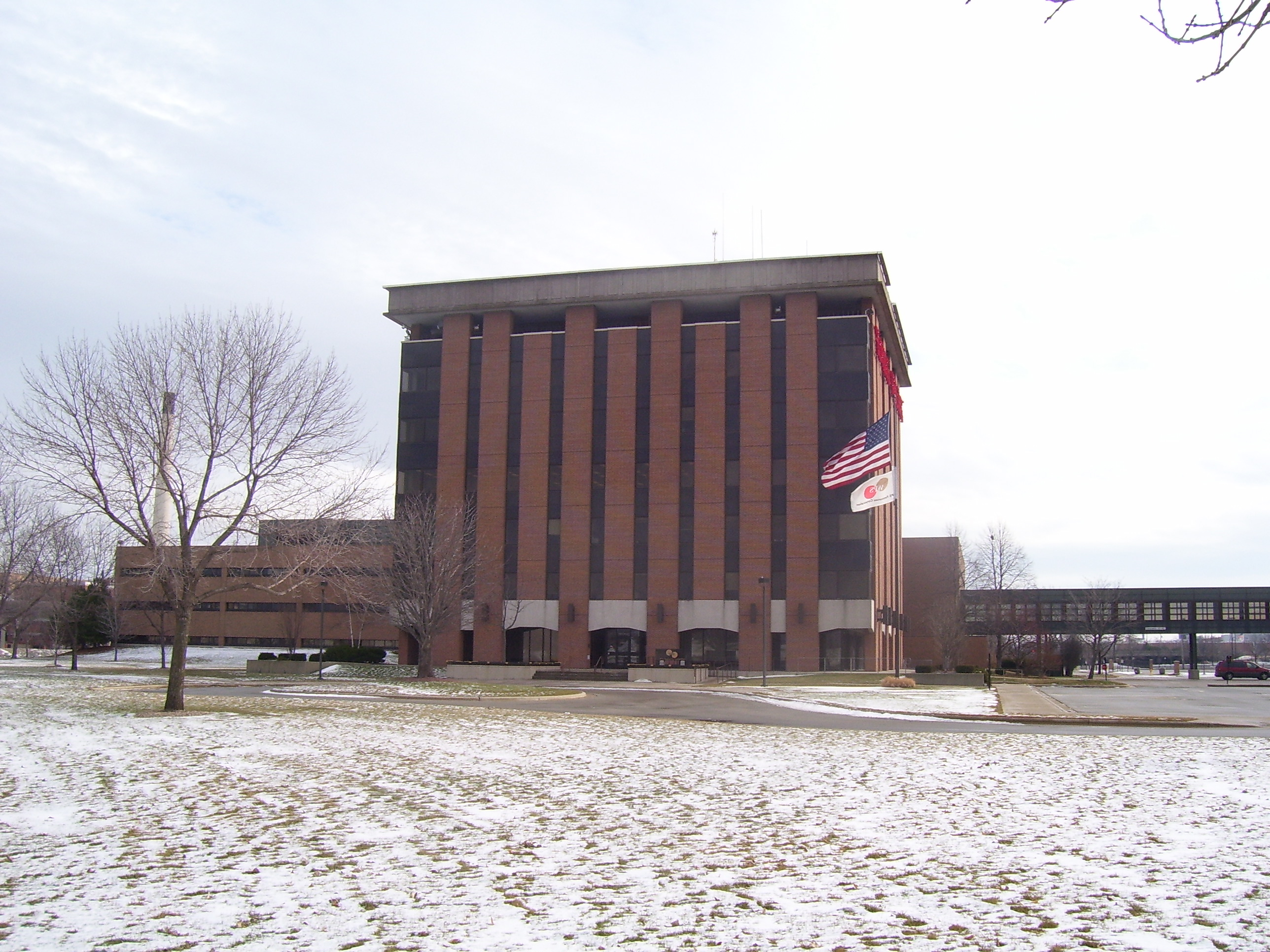
Wisconsin Public Service Corporation headquarters

Wisconsin Public Service Corporation, commonly known as WPS, is a utility company headquartered in Green Bay, Wisconsin. The company serves more than 450,000 electric customers and more than 333,000 natural gas customers in 27 counties in eastern, northeastern northern, and central Wisconsin, and a small portion of Michigan's Upper Peninsula.

== History ==
Wisconsin Public Service began in 1883 as the Oshkosh Gas Light Company. It was incorporated as the Wisconsin Public Service Corporation in 1922. It was first listed on the New York and Midwest stock exchanges in 1953. In 1994, WPS became a subsidiary of WPS Resources Corporation, an energy holding company. In February 2007, WPS Resources Corporation became part of the Integrys Energy Group.

WPS owns two coal, and one natural gas power generation plants. It also owns 15 hydroelectric power plants on the Wisconsin, Tomahawk, Peshtigo and Menominee rivers, and a wind farm in northeastern Iowa. The Weston Power Plant is a coal-fired power plant rated at 981 megawatts and is located near Wausau, Wisconsin. The Weston 4 unit was built in 2008 and is considered to be one of the cleanest coal-fired power plants in the country. The J. P. Pulliam Generating Station was a 375 MW coal-fired generating plant located near downtown Green Bay that was shuttered in 2018. The Fox Energy Center is the company's most recent acquisition (2012). It is a natural gas–fired power plant, has a capacity of nearly 500 megawatts and is located near Kaukauna, Wisconsin.

The company's transmission voltages are 69,000 volts, 115,000 volts, 138,000 volts and 345,000 volts. WPS also has a few sub-transmission lines operating at 46,000 volts. The 115 kV and 46 kV lines are mostly used in the western part of Wisconsin Public Service's service area in the Wausau, Rhinelander and Stevens Point. WPS mostly uses 24,900/14,400 volts as its distribution voltage, however, 12,470/7,200 volts systems can be found in a few rural areas. WPS is interconnected on the power grid to Minnesota Power in Duluth, Minnesota via the Arrowhead-Weston 345,000 volt line and to Xcel Energy via the Arpin-Rocky Run 345,000-volt line.

== See also ==
- WEC Energy Group
- Fixed bill
