= Sub-bituminous coal =

Lower grade of coal that contains 35–45% carbon

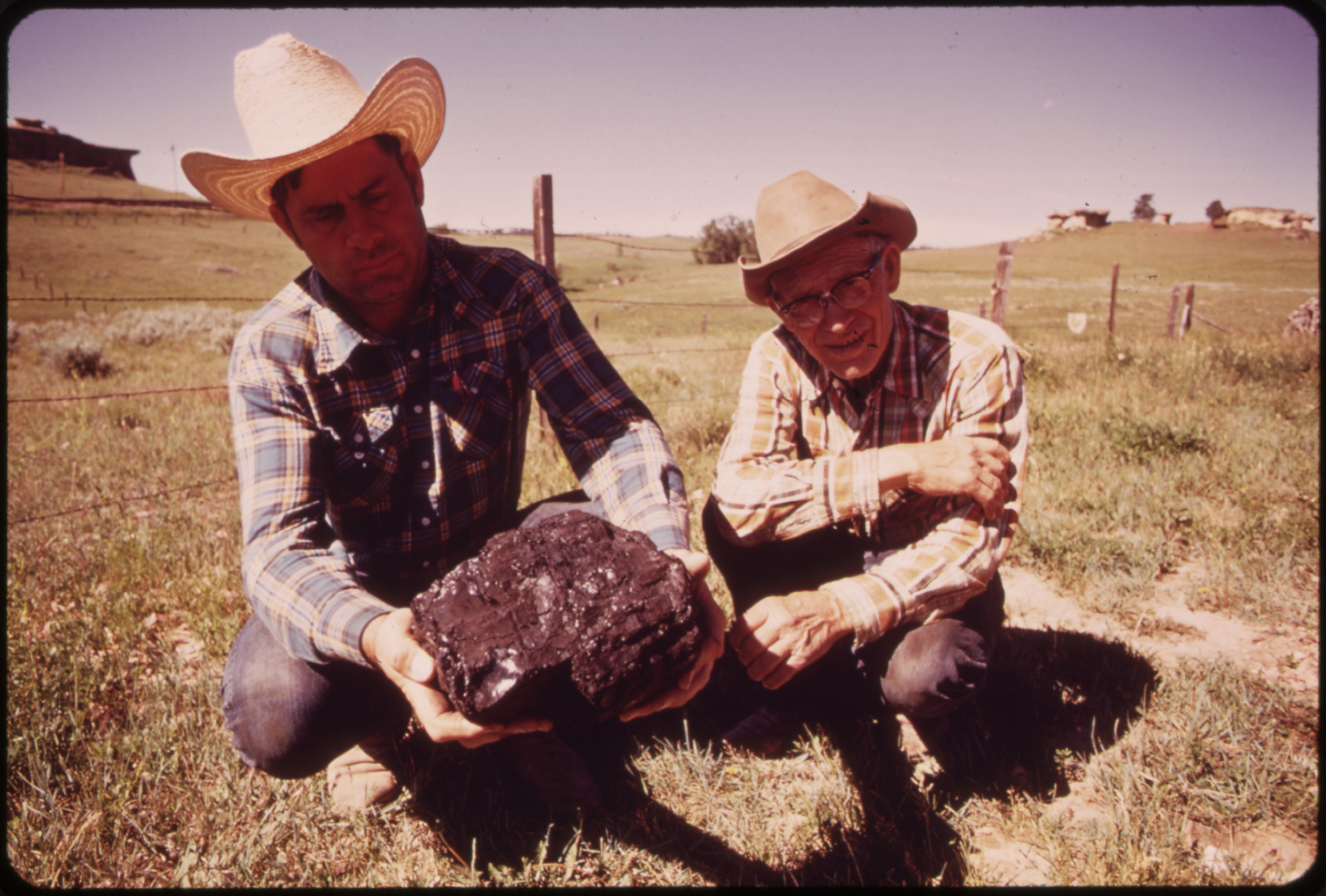
An American rancher holding a lump of sub-bituminous coal

Sub-bituminous coal is a lower grade of coal that contains 35–45% carbon. The properties of this type are between those of lignite, the lowest grade of coal, and those of bituminous coal, the second-highest grade of coal. Sub-bituminous coal is primarily used as a fuel for steam-electric power generation.

== Properties ==
Sub-bituminous coals may be dull, dark brown to black, soft and crumbly at the lower end of the range, to bright jet-black, hard, and relatively strong at the upper end. They contain 15–30% inherent moisture by weight and are non-coking (undergoing little swelling upon heating). The heat content of sub-bituminous coals ranges from 8,300 to 11,500 Btu/lb or 19.3 to 26.7 MJ/kg. Their relatively low density and high water content render some types of sub-bituminous coal susceptible to spontaneous combustion if not densely packed during storage to exclude airflow.

== Reserves ==
A major source of sub-bituminous coal in the United States is the Powder River Basin in Wyoming.

== Application ==
Sub-bituminous coals, in the United States, typically have a sulfur content less than 1% by weight, which makes them an attractive choice for power plants to reduce SO_{2} emissions under the Acid Rain Program.

Sub-bituminous coals release large quantities of greenhouse gases when burned, compared to higher grades of coal.

== See also ==
- Types of coal
- Greenhouse gas emissions#Carbon dioxide (CO2)
- Anthracite
- Bituminous coal
- Lignite
- Coal mining
- Coal mining in the United States
- Coal-fired power station
