= National Register of Historic Places listings in Chippewa County, Michigan =

Location of Chippewa County in Michigan

This is a list of the National Register of Historic Places listings in Chippewa County, Michigan.

This is intended to be a complete list of the properties and districts on the National Register of Historic Places in Chippewa County, Michigan, United States. Latitude and longitude coordinates are provided for many National Register properties and districts; these locations may be seen together in a map.

There are 28 properties and districts listed on the National Register in the county.

This National Park Service list is complete through NPS recent listings posted May 1, 2026.

	Name on the Register	Image	Date listed	Location	City or town	Description
1	Adams Building	Adams Building	April 27, 2010 (#10000218)	418 Ashmun St. 46°29′54″N 84°20′49″W	Sault Ste. Marie	The Adams Building, also known as the Central Savings Bank Building, was built as a commercial and office building by Robert N. Adams in 1903. A portion of the first floor of the building was reserved for Adams's Central Savings Bank, which remained in the building until 1975. Along with the next-door Gowan Block, it is now part of the Park Place City Center, a mixed commercial and residential development.
2	Birch Lodge Hospital and Summer Resort Sanitarium	Birch Lodge Hospital and Summer Resort Sanitarium	November 29, 1996 (#96001376)	21830 S. Birch Lodge Dr. 46°11′26″N 85°01′58″W	Trout Lake	Birch Lodge was built in 1912 as a combination of a summer resort as tuberculosis sanitorium. The property quickly ran into financial trouble, however, and it went through a series of uses until 1926, when it opened as a resort. Birch Lodge remained open until 2006, and re-opened once more in 2010. It remains a well-preserved example of early 20th century resort architecture.
3	Central Methodist Episcopal Church	Central Methodist Episcopal Church	December 27, 1984 (#84000537)	111 E. Spruce St. 46°29′52″N 84°20′47″W	Sault Ste. Marie	This church, now the Central United Methodist Church, is a Richardsonian Romanesque structure built in 1892-94 from local red sandstone excavated for a failed canal project. Although suffering three fires, in 1904, 1934, and 1941, the exterior of the church appears nearly identical to how it looked when built.
4	Chippewa County Courthouse	Chippewa County Courthouse	September 13, 1984 (#84001381)	Court St. 46°29′53″N 84°20′44″W	Sault Ste. Marie	The Chippewa County Courthouse is a three-story, cut stone, Second Empire built in 1877 using a design by Detroit architect William Scott. Additions in 1904 and c. 1930 maintain the same consistsnt Second Empire architectural style. The building is one of the oldest courthouses still in use in Michigan.
5	Church of Our Saviour, Friend of Children	Church of Our Saviour, Friend of Children	July 8, 1982 (#82002831)	North Shore Rd., Payment Settlement on Sugar Island; 46°31′39″N 84°09′05″W	Sault Ste. Marie	This church, also known as Holy Angels Roman Catholic Church, was built in 1856-57 by Michael G. Payment at the request of Bishop Frederic Baraga. Regular services were held at the church until it closed in 1953, and summer services have been held there since 1982. This church is the last remaining structure from Payment Settlement.
6	Philetus S. Church House	Philetus S. Church House	November 24, 1982 (#82000495)	North Shore Rd. 46°31′16″N 84°07′21″W	Sugar Island	This house is the last structure from Church's Landing, a trading post and steamboat stop established by Philetus S. Church in 1846. Church began supplying passing steamships with wood for their boilers, and dealt in large quantities of other goods, including furs, maple syrup, vegetables, ice, milk, soap, shingles, fence posts, and up to 12 tons of raspberry jam yearly. In 1862, Church's son Jesse Wells Church constructed this house for him. Church retired in 1876 and died in 1883, and the settlement named for him gradually disappeared.
7	DeTour Reef Light Station	DeTour Reef Light Station	March 15, 2005 (#05000151)	3.0 mi (4.8 km) south of M-134 ferry dock 45°56′56″N 83°54′11″W	DeTour Township	A light station at the southern entrance of the DeTour Passage was first installed in 1847. The current structure, built in 1931, is built atop DeTour Reef on a crib structure. The light was automated in 1974. The ownership of the station was transferred to the DeTour Reef Lighthouse Preservation Society 2005; the society completed major renovations on the structure.
8	Elmwood	Elmwood	February 25, 1974 (#74000982)	435 E. Water St. 46°29′57″N 84°20′18″W	Sault Ste. Marie	Elmwood, alson known as the Schoolcraft House or the Indian Agency, was built in 1826-27 as the headquarters for the Indian Affairs Agency throughout the upper Great Lakes, as well as the home of Indian agent Henry Rowe Schoolcraft, a notable author, explorer, and Native American culture expert. Schoolcraft lived there with his wife Jane Johnston Schoolcraft until 1833. Elmwood was also used by Charles T. Harvey, who supervised the construction of the first Soo Locks while living in the house.
9	Federal Building	Federal Building	September 9, 1977 (#77000711)	209 E. Portage Ave. 46°29′58″N 84°20′33″W	Sault Ste. Marie	The Old Federal Building was constructed of limestone in 1909-1910. It served as a post office and a courthouse of the United States District Court for the Western District of Michigan until 1941. In 1992, the Sault Foundation for Culture and History acquired the building and converted it into the River of History Museum. As of 2010, the building is being renovated in preparation for use as the City Hall.
10	First United Presbyterian Church	First United Presbyterian Church	December 27, 1984 (#84000538)	309 Lyon St. 46°29′41″N 84°20′47″W	Sault Ste. Marie	The First United Presbyterian Church congregation in the Sault has its roots as early as 1823; however, it was not until 1864, with the arrival of Rev. Thomas R. Easterday, that the congregation grew to a respectable size. They built a series of churches, and in 1902-1903 erected a large Romanesque Revival structure designed by Edward Demar and built of Jacobsville Sandstone. This church was destroyed by fire in 2000 and was rebuilt 2002.
11	Fort Drummond	Fort Drummond	October 1, 1969 (#69000069)	Western end of Drummond Island; 45°58′40″N 83°51′40″W	Drummond Island	At the conclusion of the War of 1812, the Treaty of Ghent required British troops to vacate the captured Fort Mackinac on Mackinac Island. Troops left Fort Mackinac in 1815 and came to Fort Drummond (also known as Fort Colier or Fort Colyer) on Drumond Island, then believed to be still part of British holdings. Here they built a mixed military and civilian settlement. In 1822, it was determined that Drummond Island was actually part of the United States. However, the British syated until 1828. The settlement was abandoned, and succumbed to fire and decay. SOme chimneys and hearths still mark its location.
12	Garfield School	Garfield School	April 14, 2022 (#100007579)	510 East Spruce St. 46°29′41″N 84°20′18″W	Sault Ste. Marie	
13	Gowan Block	Gowan Block	April 27, 2010 (#10000219)	416 Ashmun St. 46°29′54″N 84°20′49″W	Sault Ste. Marie	The Gowan Block, also known as the Masonic Block, was built as a commercial building and meeting hall in 1901. It was used by Gowan & Pickford Hardware (later Gowan Hardware) and the local Masonic Lodge. Along with the next-door Adams Building, it is now part of the Park Place City Center, a mixed commercial and residential development.
14	John Johnston House	John Johnston House	July 8, 1970 (#70000268)	415 E. Water St. 46°29′57″N 84°20′19″W	Sault Ste. Marie	The original section of this house was built by fur trader and Sault pioneer John Johnston in 1815, after his first house was burned by American troops in retaliation for Johnston's aid of British forces in the War of 1812. Johnston built an 1822 addition for his daughter Jane and her husband Henry Rowe Schoolcraft in 1822. In 1910, a tree fell on the house, demolishing the original 1815 section; only the 1822 addition remains.
15	Kinross Township Hall and School	Kinross Township Hall and School	February 4, 2004 (#03001549)	7305 W. Kinross Rd. 46°16′36″N 84°30′56″W	Kinross Township	The Kinross Township Hall and School was built in 1905. It is no longer used by the township, and was sold to a private owner in 2010.
16	Lipsett Hardware Building	Lipsett Hardware Building	January 14, 2013 (#12001171)	175 Main St. 46°09′29″N 84°21′40″W	Pickford	The Lipsett Hardware Building was constructed in 1912 and used as a hardware store until 1982. In 2001, the Pickford Area Historical Society bought the building and reconstructed the facade; it is now operated as a museum. The first floor features the original detailed and nearly intact tin ceiling.
17	M-28 – Tahquamenon River Bridge	M-28 – Tahquamenon River Bridge	November 30, 1999 (#99001466)	M-28 over Tahquamenon River; 46°20′46″N 84°57′32″W	Chippewa Township	The M-28 bridge over the Tahquamenon River was built in 1926, and is one of only two remaining Michigan plate girder bridges designed by the Michigan State Highway Department that have concrete encased webs on all support girders, and is one of the first bridged to feature concrete balusters. Bridges constructed later continued encasing the exterior beams, but left the interior beams unencased, but in many ways the Tahquamenon River Bridge is a prototype for numerous bridges designed by the Department over the next decade.
18	Naomikong Point Site	Naomikong Point Site	April 16, 1971 (#71001020)	Address Restricted; 46°29′00″N 84°56′00″W	Naomikong Point, Bay Mills Township, Michigan	The Naomikong Point Site, also known as 20CH2, is a Late Woodland period Laurel site located on a small point on the south shore of Lake Superior in what is now a low meadow, but was a pine forest at the time the site was used. Over 100,000 potsherds was recovered from the site, which came from at least 288 different vessels.
19	New Fort Brady	New Fort Brady	January 13, 1972 (#72000605)	Lake Superior State College campus 46°29′36″N 84°21′50″W	Sault Ste. Marie	New Fort Brady was established in 1893 at a site uphill from the earlier, "Old" Fort Brady (also on the NRHP). The site served as an Army fort until 1946, when it was declared surplus. The site and buildings are now the core of Lake Superior State University.
20	Old Fort Brady	Old Fort Brady	March 11, 1971 (#71000387)	Bounded by the C.O.E. Service Plaza on the north, Portage St. on the south, Brady St. on the east, and Bingham St. on the west 46°29′56″N 84°20′33″W	Sault Ste. Marie	In 1822, Colonel Hugh Brady established Fort Brady at Sault Sainte Marie, Michigan Territory to guard against British incursions from Canada. No further armed conflict against the British ultimately occurred in the region, and the Army ultimately abandoned the original Fort Brady. The Army re-occupied and rebuilt established Fort Brady in 1866 to protection the nearby state locks and canals formed. In 1893, the garrison was moved uphill to a new site, known as "New" Fort Brady (also on the NRHP).
21	Parker Road – Charlotte River Bridge	Parker Road – Charlotte River Bridge	January 28, 2000 (#00000009)	10 Mile Rd. over Charlotte River; 46°21′45″N 84°17′24″W	Bruce Township	The Parker Road – Charlotte River Bridge, also known as the 10 Mile Road – Charlotte River Bridge, is a three-panel, rigid-connected Warren Pony Truss bridge. This bridge was built in 1914 by the Minneapolis Bridge Company, likely at the behest of the Bruce Township Board. The structural members of the bridge are made pairs of steel angles connected back-to-back, rather than the more traditional box beams, which substantially reduces the cost of the structure.
22	Point Iroquois Light Station	Point Iroquois Light Station	May 30, 1975 (#75000940)	6 mi (9.7 km) northwest of Brimley in the Hiawatha National Forest; 46°29′05″N 84°37′51″W	Brimley	The first Point Iroquois Light Station was constructed in 1855-57; however, the structure was soon deemed inadequate. The second, and current, lighthouse was constructed in 1870, and was used continuously until it was deactivated in 1962. The structure was renovated in 1993.
23	Sault Ste. Marie Historic Commercial District	Sault Ste. Marie Historic Commercial District	October 19, 2020 (#100005683)	Ashmun St. between Water and Easterday Sts., Portage Ave. between Brady and Ferris Sts., and Ashmun St. cross street blocks of Ridge, Maple, Arlington, Ann, and Spruce Sts. 46°30′01″N 84°20′45″W	Sault Ste. Marie	
24	S.S. VALLEY CAMP	S.S. VALLEY CAMP	February 1, 1972 (#72000606)	Old Union Carbide Dock; 46°29′58″N 84°20′06″W	Sault Ste. Marie	The SS Valley Camp is a freighter boat that was launched in Lorain, Ohio, in 1917. The Valley Camp stretches 550 feet (170 m) overall with a 525-foot (160 m) keel. It served on the Great Lakes for almost 50 years, and in 1968 was turned into a museum ship.
25	Saint James' Episcopal Church	Saint James' Episcopal Church	April 1, 1998 (#98000272)	533 Bingham Ave. 46°29′44″N 84°20′48″W	Sault Ste. Marie	St. James' Episcopal Church is a Late Gothic Revival structure built in a cruciform plan, using red-brown sandstone with red sandstone trim. It was built in 1902-03 and is still used by the Episcopal congregation.
26	St. Mary's Falls Canal	St. Mary's Falls Canal	November 13, 1966 (#66000394)	Portage St. 46°30′02″N 84°21′40″W	Sault Ste. Marie	The St. Mary's Falls Canal is a 1.6 miles (2.6 km) canal containing a series of locks, and is part of the St. Marys River running from Lake Superior to Lake Huron. The first iteration of the U.S. Soo Locks was completed in May 1855, and operated by the State of Michigan until transferred to the U.S. Army in 1881. The current series of locks were built between 1895 and 1943.
27	St. Mary's Pro-Cathedral	St. Mary's Pro-Cathedral	December 27, 1984 (#84000540)	320 E. Portage Ave. 46°29′55″N 84°20′29″W	Sault Ste. Marie	Holy Name of Mary Pro-Cathedral is the original cathedral church for the Diocese of Marquette. The present church, the fifth for the parish, was built in 1881. It was designed by Canadian architect Joseph Connolly in the Gothic Revival style.
28	Whitefish Point Lighthouse	Whitefish Point Lighthouse	February 28, 1973 (#73000947)	5 mi (8.0 km) northeast of Shelldrake on Whitefish Rd. 46°46′16″N 84°57′16″W	Shelldrake	First lit in 1849, Whitefish Point Light was one of the first lighthouses on the shores of Lake Superior and is also the oldest active light on the lake. The original structure was said to resemble the Old Presque Isle Light. The current structure, while modern looking, is a Civil War relic. Built in 1861, the iron skeletal steel framework was designed to relieve stress caused by high winds.

== See also ==
- National Register of Historic Places listings in Michigan
- Listings in neighboring counties: Luce, Mackinac, Presque Isle
- List of Michigan State Historic Sites in Chippewa County, Michigan
