= Lake Superior State University =

Public university in Sault Ste. Marie, Michigan, U.S.

- Former names: Sault Ste. Marie Residence Center of the Michigan College of Mining & Technology (1946–1966); Lake Superior State College of Michigan Technological University (1966–1970); Lake Superior State College (1970–1987)
- Motto: Believe in Blue; Redefining the Classroom.
- Type: Public college
- Established: 1946; 80 years ago
- Endowment: US$39.3 million
- President: Dr. David Travis
- Faculty: 115 full-time
- Students: 1,669 (fall 2023)
- Location: Sault Sainte Marie, Michigan, U.S. 46.493°N 84.363°W
- Campus: Small city 115 acre campus
- Colors: Blue & gold
- Nickname: Lakers
- Sporting affiliations: NCAA Division I – CCHA; NCAA Division II – GLIAC
- Mascots: Seamore the Sea Duck, Fog Horn the Sailor
- Website: www.lssu.edu
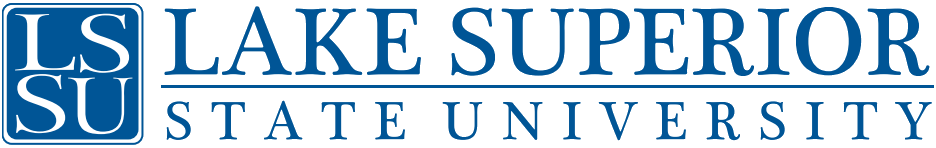

Lake Superior State University (colloquially Lake State, Soo Tech, and LSSU) is a public college in Sault Ste. Marie, Michigan, United States. It enrolls approximately 1,600 students. Due to its proximity to the Canada–United States border, LSSU has many Canadian students and offers joint programs with Sault College and Algoma University in the twin city of Sault Ste. Marie, Ontario, Canada across the St. Marys River. In a sign of this close relationship with its international neighbor, LSSU flies both the Canadian and United States flags on its campus.

LSSU offers primarily bachelor's and associate degrees, but also offers certificates. LSSU has regional centers in northern Michigan in the cities of Escanaba and Petoskey. It is one of three Michigan public colleges or universities that is also a community college.

== History ==
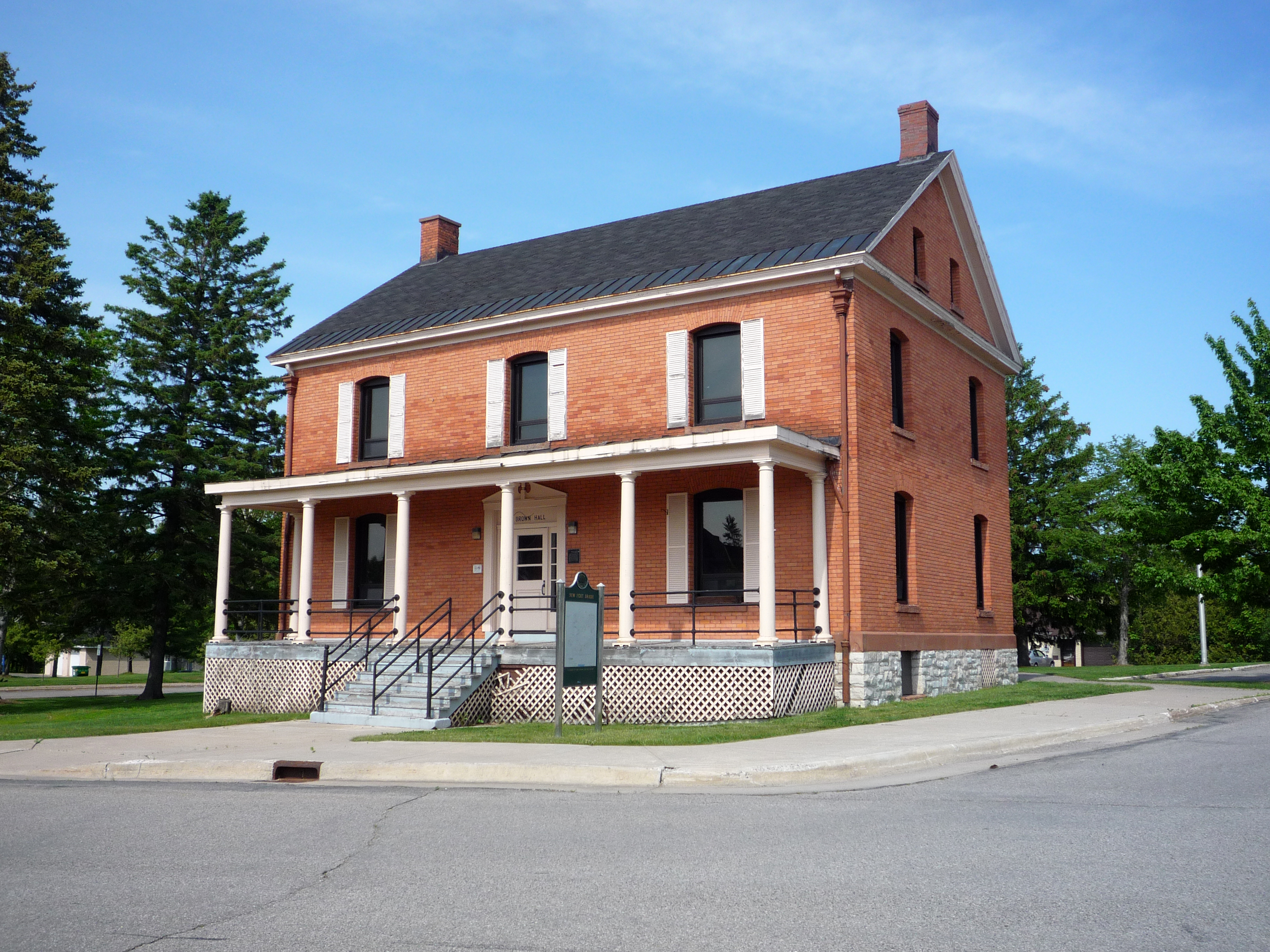
Brown Hall served as post headquarters of Fort Brady. It was the home of the Fine Arts Academy until the Fine Arts Center opened in 2005, and it now serves as the office building for the Integrated Marketing Department.

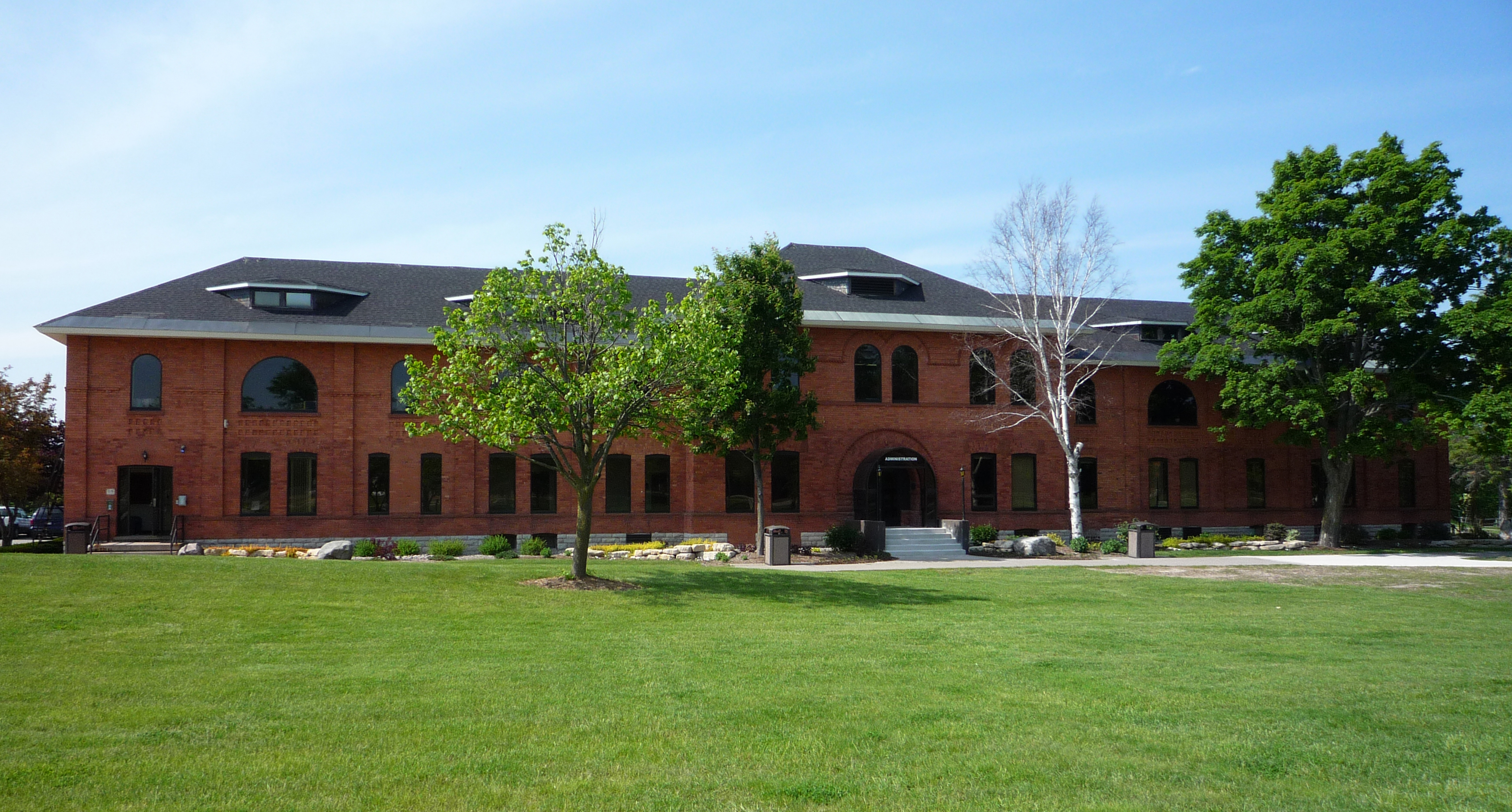
The Administration Building was originally the Quartermaster's building in Fort Brady.

The area that makes up the campus of Lake Superior State University served as Fort Brady from 1894 to 1944; it is listed as "New Fort Brady" on the National Register of Historic Places, as the earlier incarnation of the fort was downhill.

Lake Superior State University was established in 1946 to address the needs of returning World War II veterans and to provide educational opportunities to the people of the Eastern Upper Peninsula. The 115-acre (0.47 km^{2}) campus includes several buildings which are listed in the National Register of Historic Places.

The institution was originally a branch of Michigan College of Mining & Technology, which is now known as Michigan Technological University. It opened in 1946 as the Sault Ste. Marie Residence Center of the Michigan College of Mining & Technology, which was commonly shortened to Soo Tech. The original class consisted of 272 students. The institution was later renamed Lake Superior State College of Michigan Technological University in 1966. The college received autonomy from Michigan Tech in 1970 and was known as Lake Superior State College until 1987, when the institution was granted university status.

The institution's college radio station is WLSO, and its student newspaper is The Compass.

== Academics ==
Lake Superior State's most popular majors, by 2021 graduates, were:

Criminal Justice/Law Enforcement Administration (46)
Registered Nursing/Registered Nurse (34)
Fisheries & Wildlife Management (29)
Exercise Science and Kinesiology (20)
Business/Commerce (19)
Biology/Biological Sciences (17)

== Major buildings ==
- New Fort Brady
- U.S. National Register of Historic Places
- U.S. Historic district
- Michigan State Historic Site
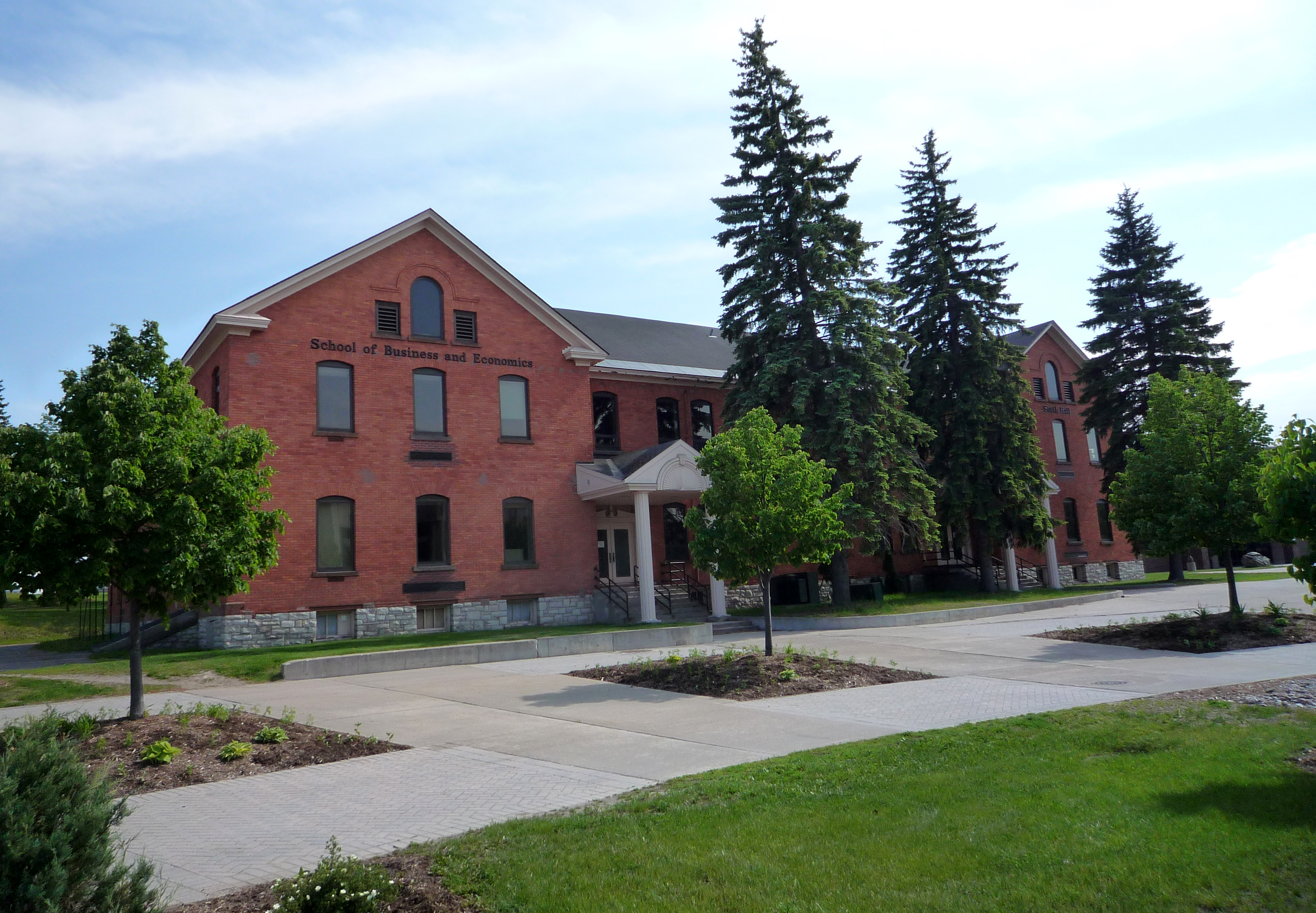
- Original barracks of Fort Brady

- Location within Michigan Location within the United States
- Location: Lake Superior State University
- Coordinates: 46°29′36″N 84°21′34″W
- NRHP reference No.: 72000605

Significant dates
- Added to NRHP: January 13, 1972
- Designated MSHS: July 17, 1971

- Administration Building: The Administration Building houses the offices of the President and Provost, as well as human resources, purchasing, and public safety.
- Arts Center: The arts center is a $15 million facility which opened in 2005. The arts center houses a 674-seat auditorium, art, music and dance studios, classrooms and faculty offices. The Arts Center Gallery has a permanent display from the L. F. Noyes Collection of Native American and Western Art.
- Brady Hall: This building is currently being used as freshmen housing. The building is named after Colonel Hugh Brady. Col. Brady was the first commanding officer to serve at Fort Brady. Brady Hall was built as barracks for WACS or Women's Army Corps in 1938.
- Brown Hall: Built in the 1820s, this building served as the captain's quarters of Fort Brady. Brown Hall wasn't called by its present name until 1982 when it was named for retired employee, Edward J. Brown. In the 1940s, the school as well as this building became a guide for veterans of WWII. Remodeling of this hall took place in 1946. In the 1960s, Brown Hall was converted into a counseling and career center that provided academic advising. It was originally led by Steve Youngs and was later taken on by John Truckey. It once served as the location of the School of Education, and the Fine Arts Program. It now houses the Integrated Marketing Department. Much of the known information about this building can be recovered from the LSSU KJS Library Special Collections room.
- CASET: The Center for Applied Science and Engineering Technology is home to the School of Engineering and Technology, as well as the School of Mathematics and Computer Science. CASET also houses the LSSU Robotics Lab and the Product Development Center.
- Cisler Center: The Walker Cisler Student and Conference Center is the main food service and student life building on campus. Dining options include the Quarterdeck and Galley, which features the Grill 155 and a convenience store. It is also home to the Office of Campus Life and Housing, and hosts the Peacock Cove Coffee House, Student Government offices, Student Organization Center, the school newspaper (The Compass), and the University radio station (WLSO).
- Crawford Hall: This building focuses on the many science and allied health degrees offered at the university, from nursing to biology and chemistry, to geology and environmental science. In 2000, a $23 million renovation and expansion was completed, providing modern laboratory, classroom, and faculty and student research space. Crawford Hall also houses the LSSU Superior Analytics Laboratory, Ben Long Planetarium, the Cannabis Center of Excellence and Lion Labs Institute, the Environmental Molecular Biology Lab, Kemp Mineral Museum, and the Micro Analysis & Spectroscopic Characterization (MASC) Lab.
- Fletcher Center: Business Operations, Financial Aid, Registrar, and Scheduling can all be found in the former gymnasium for Fort Brady and later, the Soo Tech Hornets. It was named after LSSU benefactor, H. Thayer Fletcher
- Norris Center: This is the main building for recreation, and the School of Criminal Justice, Fire Science and Emergency Medical Services and the School of Recreation and Exercise Science. It is also the main building for the Athletic Department and includes the main office for the Athletic Director. Inside the building lies the Cooper Gym, home of the Laker basketball and volleyball teams; Taffy Abel Arena, home of the Laker hockey team; and the Student Activity Center (SAC), which hosts tennis, track, a weights area and climbing wall. The university has announced a renovation effort to several athletic Norris Center facilities.
- Shouldice Library: The Kenneth J. Shouldice Library facility houses offices for Social Sciences, Business, English and Communications, and two lecture halls. The main level includes the main circulation desk and audio visual, and the Testing Center. It also offers a student computer lab, interactive TV rooms and the Shouldice Gallery. The lower level is home to the Learning Center, Career Services, and academic supportive services. The second floor has a special collections room with five special collections including the Oschner Collection, and a group of Native American, Mayan, European, and African American artifacts and books.
- R.W. Considine Hall: Formerly South Hall, R.W. Considine Hall is the home to LSSU's Lukenda School of Business, and provides state-of the art teaching and meeting facilities for all campus programs. In 2017, a three-year, $13.5 million project took the existing 32,000 sq. ft. South Hall and added another 12,000 sq. feet to provide an interactive commons, new program and conference rooms, faculty offices and support spaces, a securities trading lab, the Frenchie LaJoie Board Room, and a Center for Entrepreneurship and Innovation that will serve the twin Sault Communities on both sides of the U.S. and Canadian border.

The LSSU Foundation Office raised $3.6 million in its capital campaign for the project ($600,000 more than expected). The State of Michigan provided $9 million. The building's namesake - Robert W. Considine - partnered with LSSU's Foundation Office in 2014 to push the project over its funding goal by matching gifts up to $450,000.

Built in 1903, the original South Hall building was built to house Fort Brady's infantry soldiers. The infantry barracks were originally composed of twin buildings. South Hall's twin stood approximately 80 feet to the west of South Hall, and was known as the Forestry Building. The two buildings were connected by a third building, which was a one-floor 80 ft by 40 ft wooden structure consisting of an outer shell with a hard wood floor. The building was referred to as the "drill floor". ROTC cadets practiced marching in the building during inclement weather; otherwise, drills took place outside on the parade grounds, which is where the Kenneth Shouldice Library now stands.

The Forestry building was destroyed by fire in the early 1960s. The drill floor building was not damaged but was razed during the demolition of the Forestry Building. The floor itself was scavenged and sold. Prior to this time, South Hall was always referred to as the Library although the library only took up a portion of the building. The Campus Book Store used two floors before moving to the renovated Canusa Hall, which saw dining services move to the Cisler Center.

== Admissions ==
Fall first-time freshman statistics
	2021	2020	2019	2018	2017	2016
Applicants	2,309	1,709	1,657	2,846	1,180	1,457
Admits	1,680	1,180	941	1,785	661	1,320
Admit rate	72.8	69.0	56.8	62.7	56.0	90.6
Enrolled	324	303	296	338	294	379
Yield rate	19.3	25.7	31.5	18.9	44.4	28.7
ACT composite* (out of 36)	19-27	18-26	18-23	20-26	19-26	20-25
SAT composite* (out of 1600)	963-1178	950-1170	970-1160	990-1200	990-1180	—
* middle 50% range

LSSU is considered "selective" by U.S. News & World Report. For the Class of 2025 (enrolling Fall 2021), LSSU received 2,309 applications and accepted 1,680 (72.8%), with 324 enrolling. The middle 50% range of SAT scores for enrolling freshmen was 963-1178. The middle 50% ACT composite score range was 19-27.

== Facilities ==
- Richard and Theresa Barch Center for Freshwater Research and Education: Previously known at the Aquatic Research Lab (ARL) was an off campus research and educational facility originally located in the east end of the Cloverland Electric Coop hydroelectric plant. Now the designated fishery for CFRE, the hatchery has released more than 40,000 Atlantic salmon into the St.Mary's River since 1984. The new $13.2 million CFRE building, funded by Richard and Theresa Barch, officially opened in December 2021, stands out as a significant attraction on the St. Marys River. The facility is fulfilling its core mission of conducting freshwater research and public outreach, teaching students with a K-12 discovery lab, and providing office space for university researchers and partners, such as members from the USFWS and USCG. Much of the research is geared toward fish culture and management, emerging contaminants in the St. Marys River, and managing invasive species throughout the region.

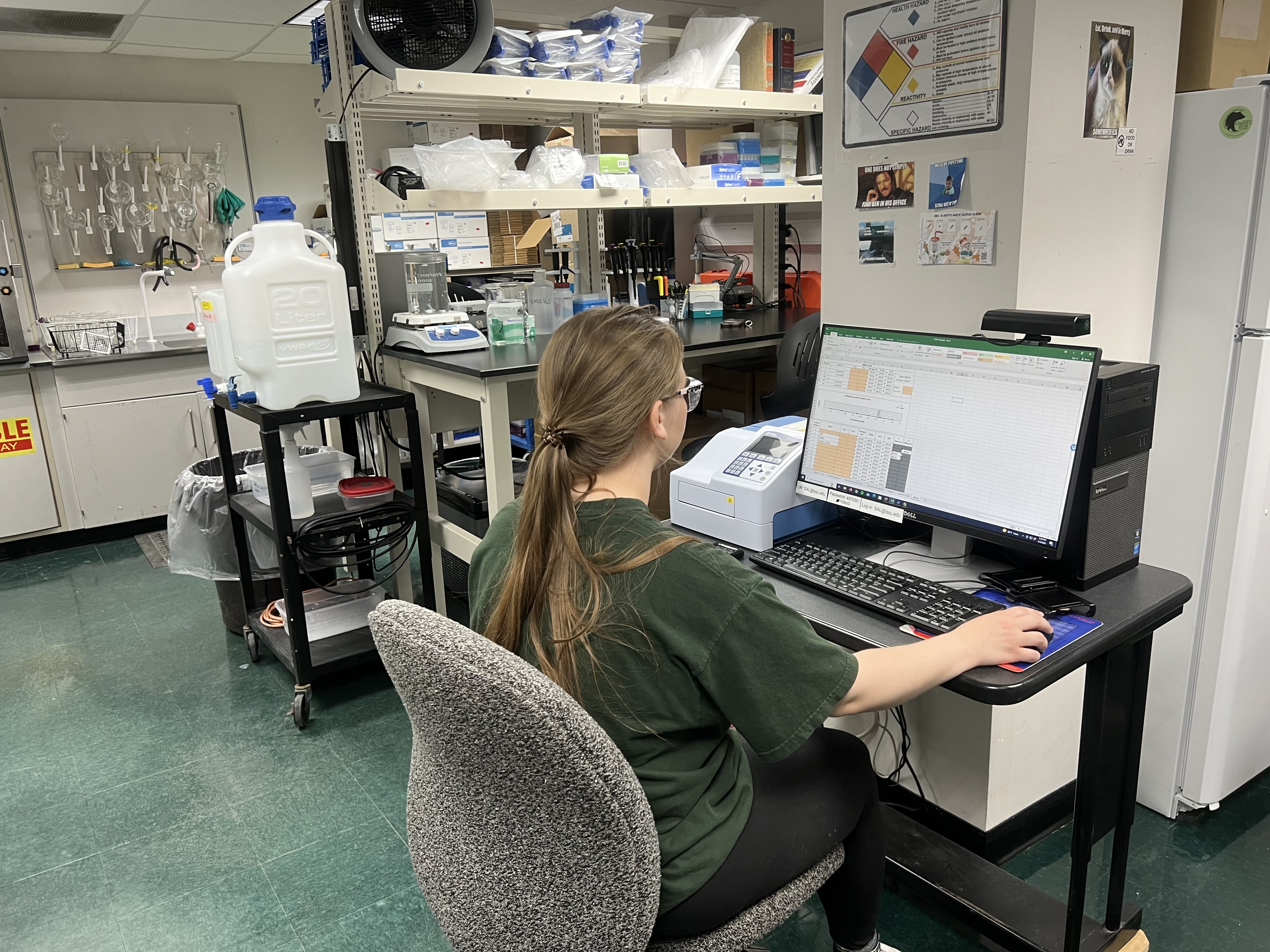
The Superior Analytics Lab at LSSU

- Superior Analytics Laboratory: The SAL is housed in the chemistry department at LSSU, and provides analytical services to LSSU researchers, government agencies, businesses, and private citizens. The SAL routinely conducts standard environmental testing, as well as trace level analysis of environmental contaminants such as pesticides, persistent organic pollutants, metals, and cyanotoxins. Revenues from the SAL assist the Chemistry Department in purchasing and maintaining state of the art analytical instrumentation, and provide students with employment opportunities and experience working in a professional lab.

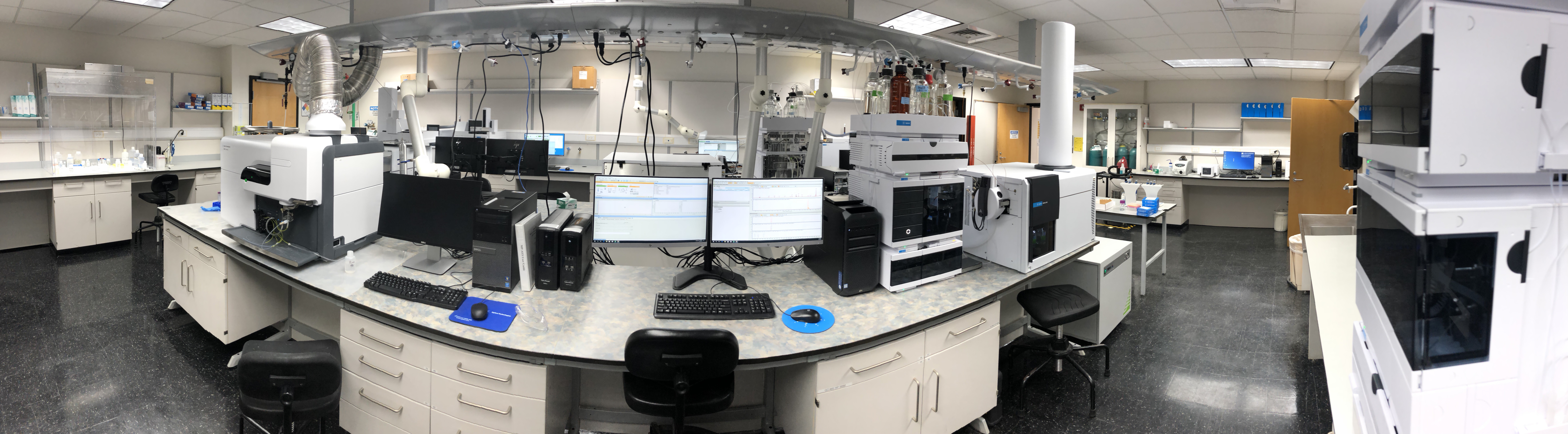
LSSU Cannabis Center of Excellence

- Cannabis Center of Excellence & Lion Labs Institute: The Cannabis Center of Excellence, sponsored by Agilent Technologies, opened in 2019. As northern Michigan's leading center for mass spectrometry and chemical analysis, the CCE supports faculty and student research, and the undergraduate programs in Biology, Biochemistry, Cannabis Chemistry, Chemistry, Environmental Science, Forensic Chemistry, and Geology. The Lion Labs Institute conducts research and education on the extraction and purification of natural products, and contains facilities for hydrocarbon extraction, ethanol extraction, and distillation/purification.

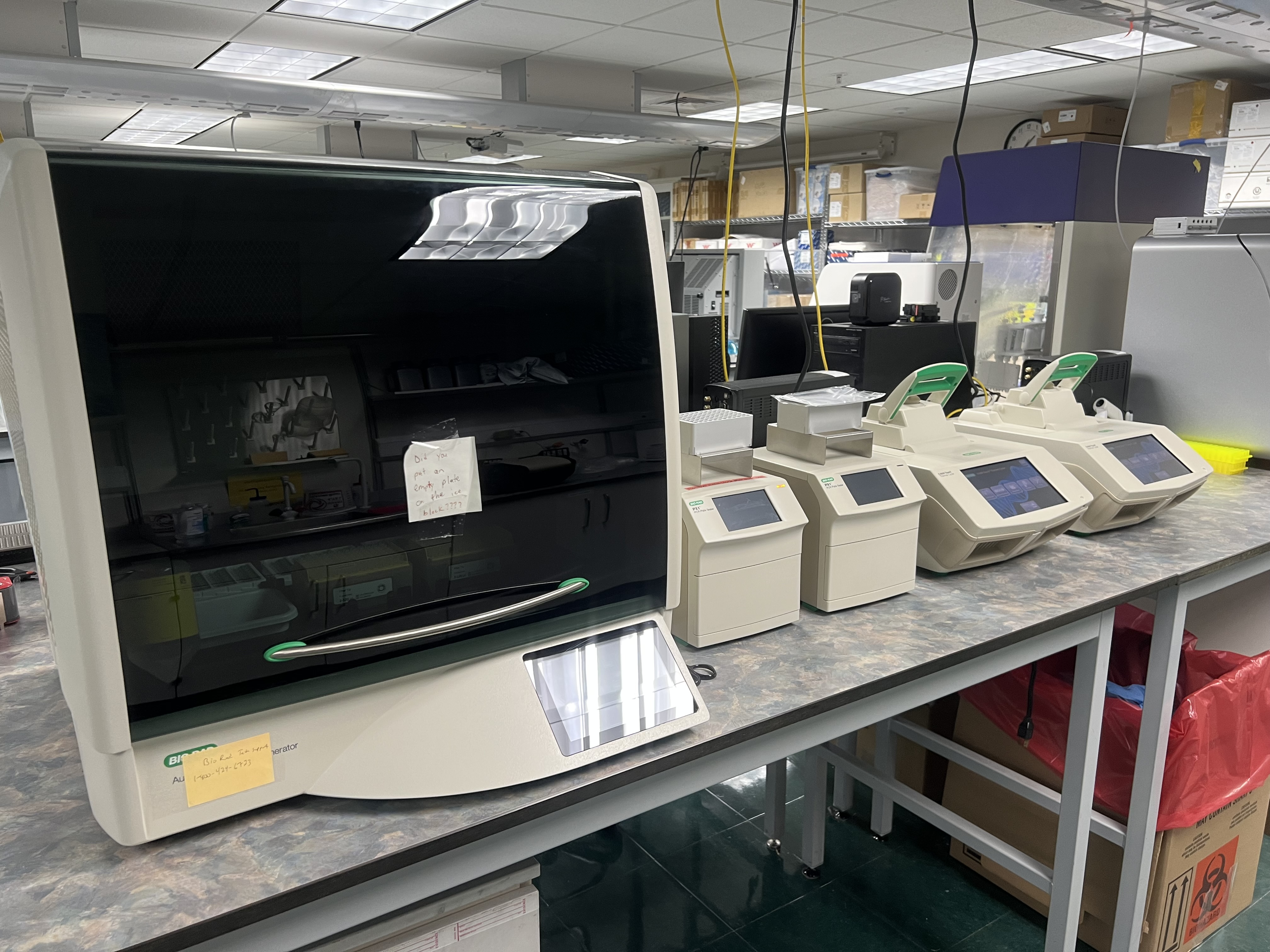
LSSU Environmental Molecular Biology Lab (EMBL)

- Environmental Molecular Biology Lab: The Environmental Molecular Biology Lab is a multi-investigator research facility specializing in the application of cutting edge molecular & genetic techniques to the study of human disease through wastewater epidemiology, zoonotic diseases, and wildlife disease. Instrumentation includes ddPCR, qPCR, and nanopore long read genetic sequencing.
- Robotics Lab: The LSSU Robotics Lab is a multimillion-dollar facility dedicated to student instruction in robotics and automation technology. Robotic workcells use FANUC, Stäubli, and Kuka industrial robots.

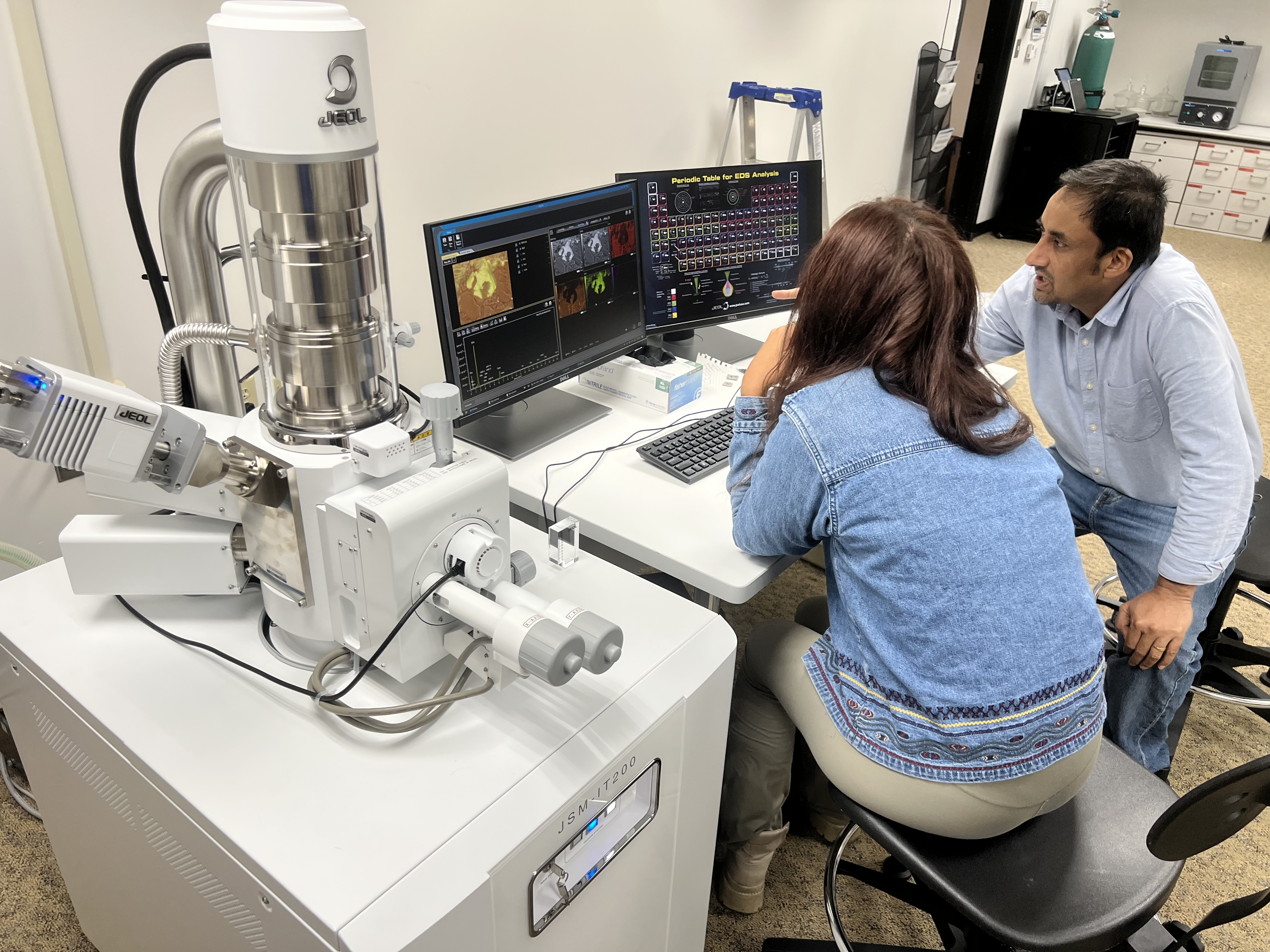
The SEM at the LSSU MASC Lab

- Micro Analysis & Spectroscopic Characterization (MASC) Lab: The MASC Lab is a regional research facility dedicated to the characterization of biologic, geologic, and engineered material as well as forensic trace evidence and environmental contaminants. Established in 2023 with funding from the National Science Foundation, MASC Lab core instrumentation includes a Scanning Electron Microscope (SEM) and a micro X-Ray Fluorescence spectrometer (υXRF). Additional instrumentation includes a quantum cascade laser infrared chemical imaging system, fluorescence microscopy, and polarized light microscopy.
- Simulation Center: In the fall of 2018, through a collaboration with a community member of interest, the Lake Superior State University/War Memorial Hospital (LSSU/WMH) Simulation Center was created as a partnership and allowed the Simulation Center to be moved to an on-campus location. This center is housed in a newly renovated space in the Arts Center Building. With a little more than 4,000 sq. feet, the simulation center provides a wide range of simulated experiences for students using high-fidelity male, female, pediatric, and infant simulators. There are three designated patient care areas each with their own control and debriefing rooms. Each patient room consists of working infusion pumps, headwall units, patient monitors, and simulated electronic health records. There is a spacious medication/supply area with a simulated medication-dispensing unit. Because the simulation center provides learning experiences as part of the paramedic program, a simulated ambulance was purchased during the fall 2018 semester, which provides for an increased ability to coordinate and run Interprofessional simulation experiences.

== Traditions ==
Lake Superior State University has a variety of traditions.

- Banished Words List: Each new year brings another installment of the school's "List of Words and Phrases Banished from the Queen's English for Mis-Use, Over-Use and General Uselessness". It has been published since New Year's Day 1976 and receives significant media coverage. Word-watchers pull nominations throughout the year from everyday speech, as well as from the news, fields of education, technology, advertising, politics, and more. A committee gathers the entries and chooses the best in December. The list is released on New Year's Day.
- Hoholik Victory Bell: The bell, outside the Norris Center and Taffy Abel Arena, is rung after each home victory. Fans gather around the bell as members of the hockey team make their way outside in the cold temperatures to ring the bell. This tradition was started after the bell was hung in the early 1980s. The original bell was replaced in 1992 after extensive damage from the 1992 NCAA Championship celebration.
- Ship's Horn: An authentic ship's horn is within the Taffy Abel Arena, where the Lakers play home hockey games. The horn is mounted high on the wall behind the goal a visiting team defends for two periods. The powerful horn, operated on compressed air, blasts after each Laker goal and at the end of each home game.
- Snowman Burning: Each March, on or near the first day of Spring, students, alumni and townsfolk gather around a 10 to 12-foot (3.7 m) snowman on campus and light it on fire. The snowman burning is derived from a German tradition in which the mayor of the town melts snowflakes to declare an end to winter. The snowmen are usually made out of recycled paper and wire. In 1992, the event was canceled due to protests from the Environmental Awareness Club, a student group at Lake Superior State University. This decision upset many people. Calls came in from all over the country. Radio stations, newspapers, citizens, alumni, and local people were all angry. A student poll was taken by The Compass (Lake State's campus newspaper) in the fall semester after the cancelled year of the snowman burning. Of 500 students polled, 450 voted to burn a snowman. After receiving so many complaints the tradition was reinstated the following year in 1993.
- Snowmobile Race: The city of Sault Ste. Marie puts on the annual I-500 snowmobile race held at a one-mile (1.6 km) oval behind the Norris Center on the campus of Lake State. The event draws a big crowd and is held the first Saturday of February.
- The Unicorn Hunters established the banished words list and snowman burning. They also put on stone-skipping tournaments and started a literary magazine. As their name suggests, they also searched for unicorns. Once an ABC News crew found their way to the campus and filmed students "questing for unicorns." "The Quest, of course, is the pursuit of the unicorn, and the unicorn is one's personal vision of perfection or happiness (McWhirter)."

== Athletics ==
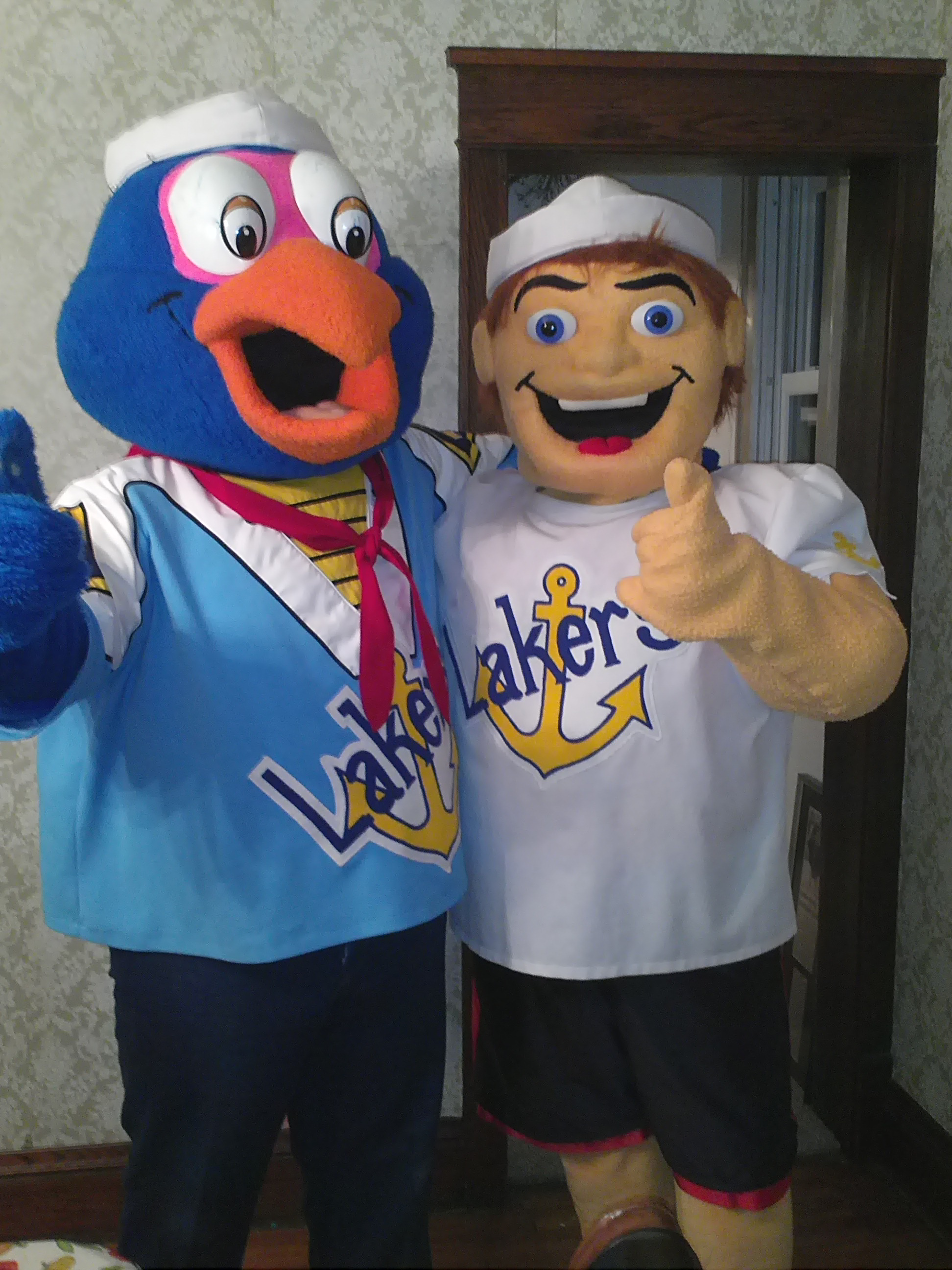
Left: Seamore the Sea Duck. Right: Foghorn the sailor. October 31, 2011.

The school's official nickname is the Lakers, but in some instances the athletic teams are called the Soo Lakers in reference to the institution's hometown. Prior to becoming known as the Lakers, sports teams were known as the Hornets. The most prominent sport at LSSU is men's ice hockey, which is the school's only NCAA Division I program. The men's ice hockey team is a member of the Central Collegiate Hockey Association, being one of seven teams that left the Western Collegiate Hockey Association after the 2020–21 season to reestablish the CCHA. Other sports at LSSU play at a Division II level in the Great Lakes Intercollegiate Athletic Conference, of which LSSU is a charter member. At $1284 per student, in 2015 the student subsidy for athletics at LSSU was the highest among all Michigan's public universities (this compares to $14 at MSU and $6 at U-M).(24)

== Notable alumni ==
- Bates Battaglia, 1994–1997, professional hockey player
- Rick Comley, college hockey coach
- Chris Dahlquist, professional hockey player
- Jim Dowd, 1987–1991, professional hockey player
- John Gallant, professional lacrosse player
- John Grahame, 1994–1997, professional hockey player
- Dan Keczmer, professional hockey player
- Darrin Madeley, professional hockey player
- Terry McDermott, Olympic speed skater
- Eric Menk, 1992–1996, professional basketball player
- Steven Oleksy, 2006–2009, professional hockey player
- Nathan Perkovich, professional hockey player
- Steven Rinella, 1995, author, travel writer, and outdoor television host
- Brian Rolston, 1991–1993, professional hockey player
- Derek Smith, 2004–2007, professional hockey player
- John Toon, actor
- Rob Valicevic, 1991–1995, professional hockey player
- Doug Weight, 1989–1991, professional hockey coach
- Jim Wiley, 1968–72, professional hockey player
