= Sault Ste. Marie Historic Commercial District =

- U.S. National Register of Historic Places
- U.S. Historic district
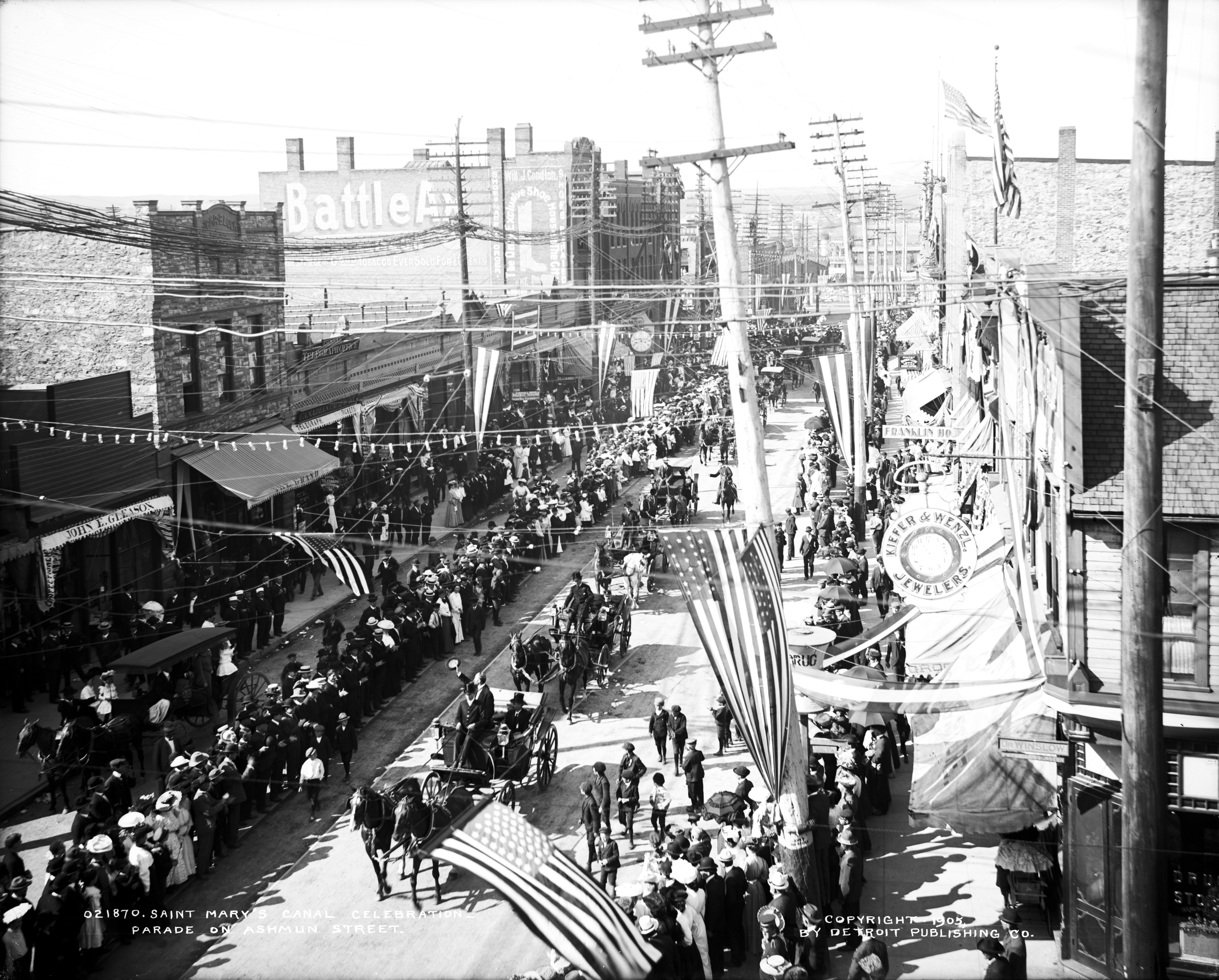
- Ashmun Street, 1905

- Location within Michigan Location within the United States
- Interactive map
- Location: Ashmun St. between Water and Easterday Sts., Portage Ave. between Brady and Ferris Sts., and Ashmun St. cross street blocks of Ridge, Maple, Arlington, Ann, and Spruce Sts., Sault Ste. Marie
- Coordinates: 46°30′1″N 84°20′45″W
- Architectural style: Italianate, Late Victorian, Richardsonian Romanesque, and Commercial Brick, Neoclassical, Colonial Revival
- NRHP reference No.: 100005683
- Added to NRHP: October 19, 2020

The Sault Ste. Marie Historic Commercial District is a primarily commercial historic district located in Sault Ste. Marie, Michigan. It was listed on the National Register of Historic Places in 2020. The district includes the Old Federal Building, Chippewa County Courthouse, Central Methodist Episcopal Church, the Adams Building, and the Gowan Block, all of which are listed separately on the National Register.

== History ==
Sault Ste. Marie was first settled by European immigrants in 1668. It was controlled by Britain or France until after the War of 1812, when the border between Canada and the United States was fixed at the St. Marys River. As settlement of Michigan's Upper Peninsula increased, Sault Ste. Marie grew, due to its strategic location on the portage route around the rapids. This was accelerated by the 1840s copper boom, and more so by the construction of the first American lock in 1855. By this time, the early commercial center of the city along Water Street was expanded along nearby Ashmun Street. The twelve commercial enterprises in the city in 1856 grew to 70 by 1879.

The city boomed in the 1880 and 1890s, with a number of buildings constructed. The move of the commercial center from Water Street to Ashmun was accelerated by two things: the 1892 relocation of Fort Brady, which opened up real estate, and two disastrous fires in 1886 and 1896, which destroyed many of the commercial buildings on Water Street. A hydroelectric power canal was constructed in the early 20th century, and the commercial district expanded even more rapidly in response. Construction slowed down in the 1910s and 20s, and even more in the 1930s due to the Great Depression. Construction picked up after World War II, but the downtown declined in the 1950s and 1960s as urban sprawl drew people away from the commercial core of the city. However, more recently, the Downtown Development Authority has reinvigorated the downtown area.

== Description ==
The Sault Ste. Marie Commercial Historic District includes the historic business district in the center of the city, and the nearby houses of early residents and business leaders. This district contains 146 buildings, of which 104 contribute to the historical character of the neighborhood. The buildings are mostly two stories in height, and were constructed between c. 1820 and 1968, although most date from the late nineteenth century. Architectural styles include Italianate, Late Victorian, Richardsonian Romanesque, and Commercial Brick commercial buildings, Neoclassical public buildings, and vernacular and Colonial Revival houses.

The commercial blocks of the district are located along the five blocks of Ashmun Street south to the Power Canal, and the adjacent blocks east and west along Portage Avenue. Although the district is predominantly commercial, it also includes with several government buildings and religious properties, as well as historic residences along Water and Bingham streets, most of which have been converted to commercial use.

== Gallery ==
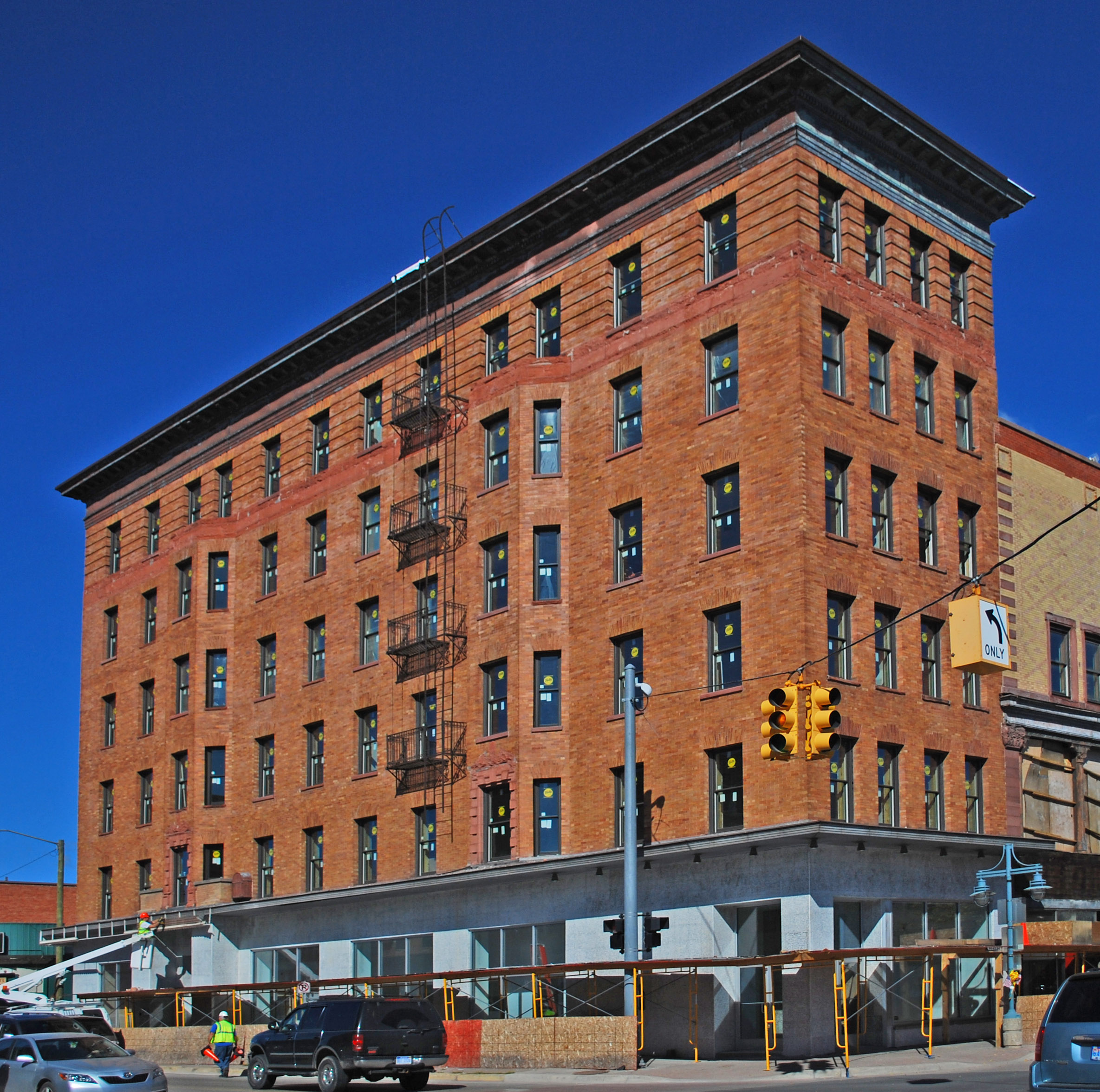
Adams Building

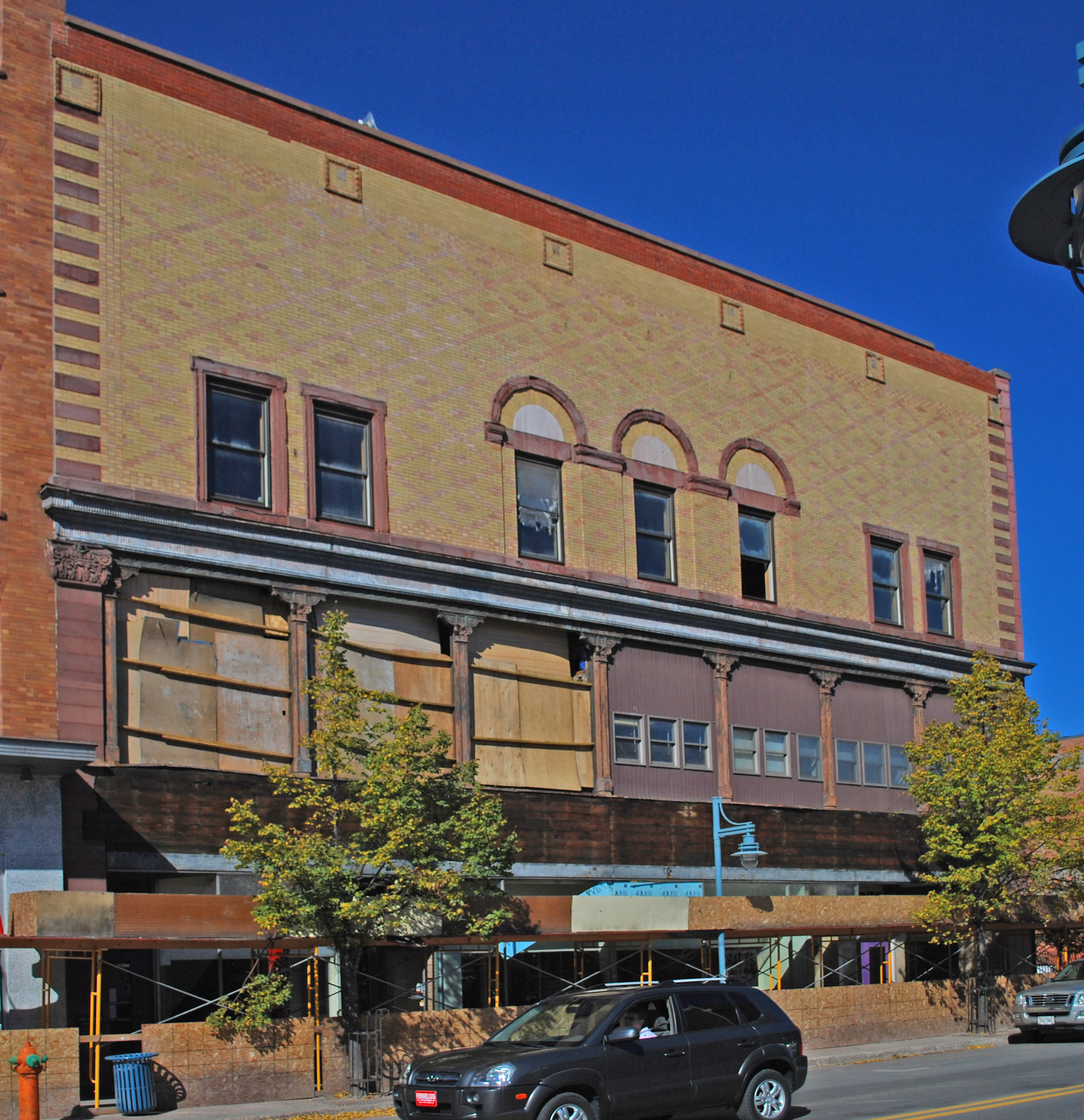
Gowan Block

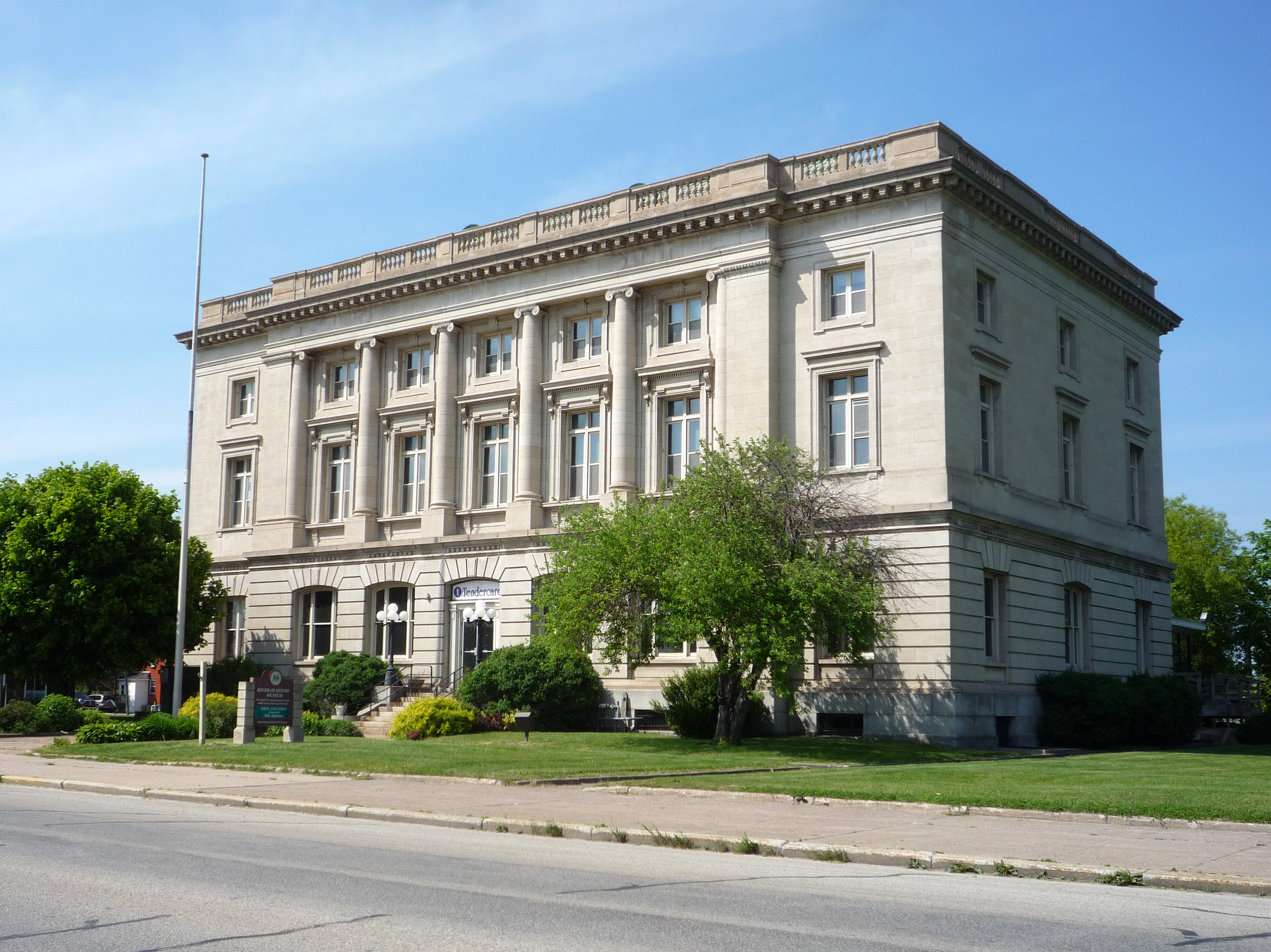
Old Federal Building

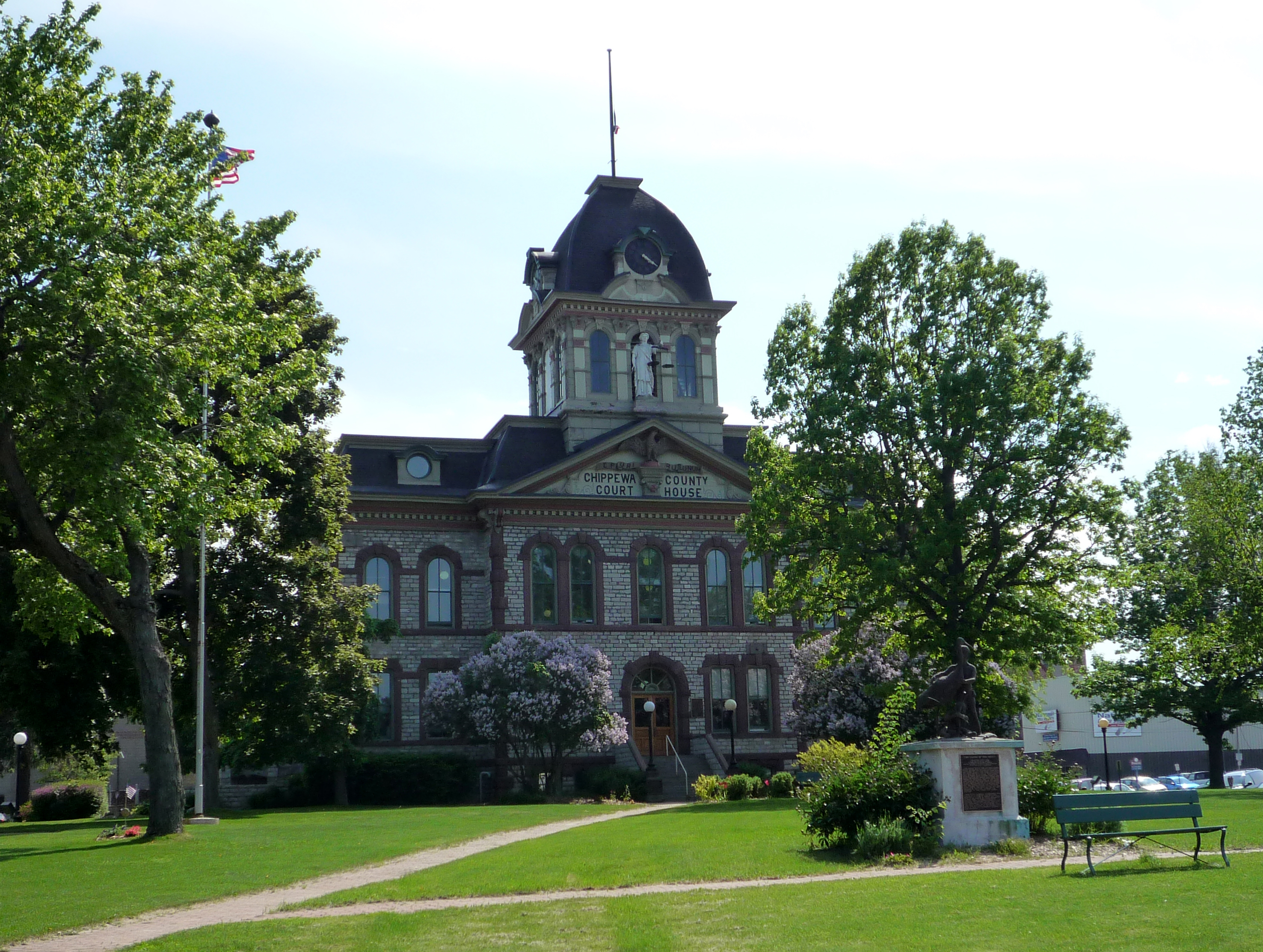
Chippewa County Courthouse

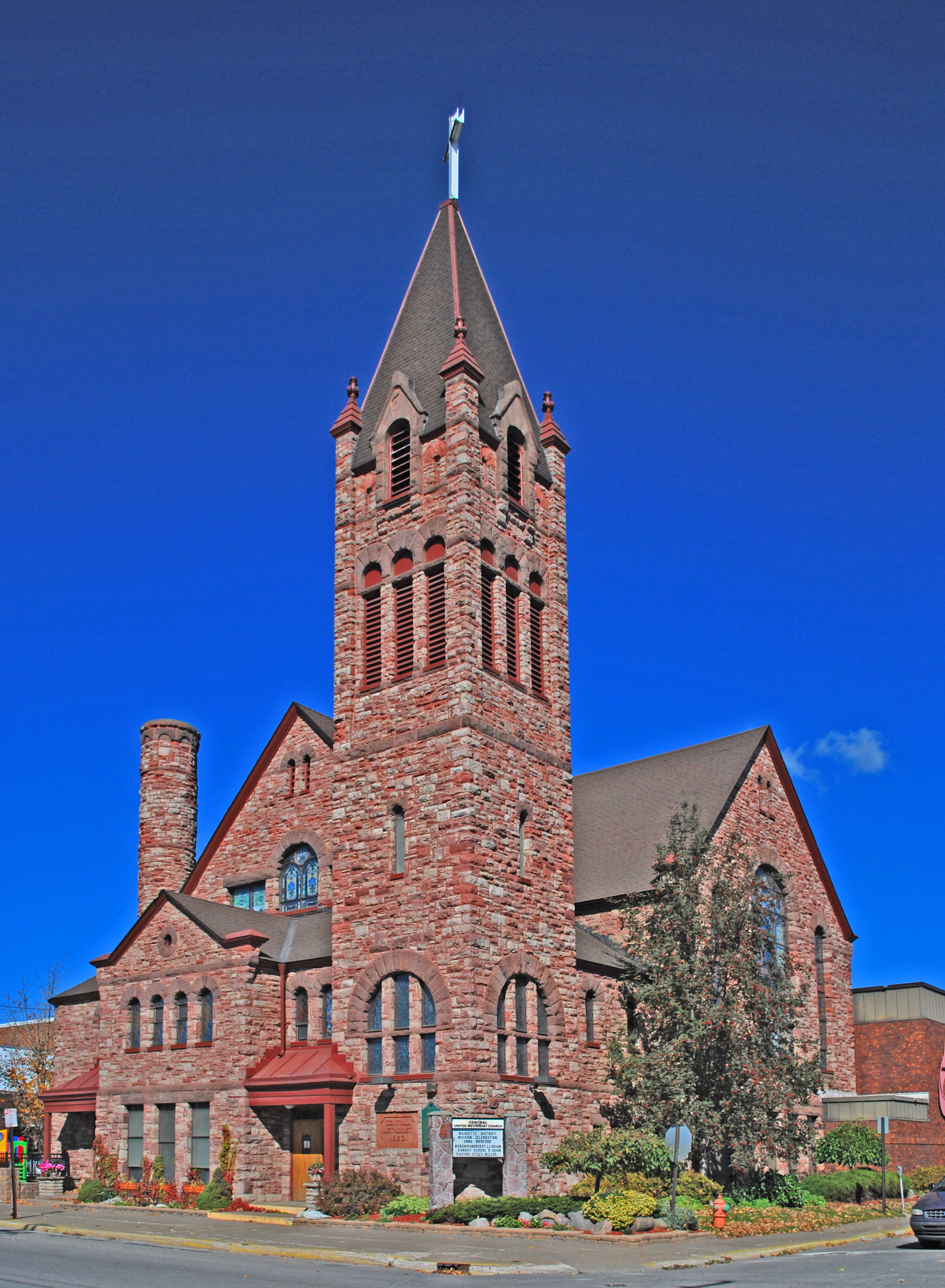
Central Methodist Episcopal Church

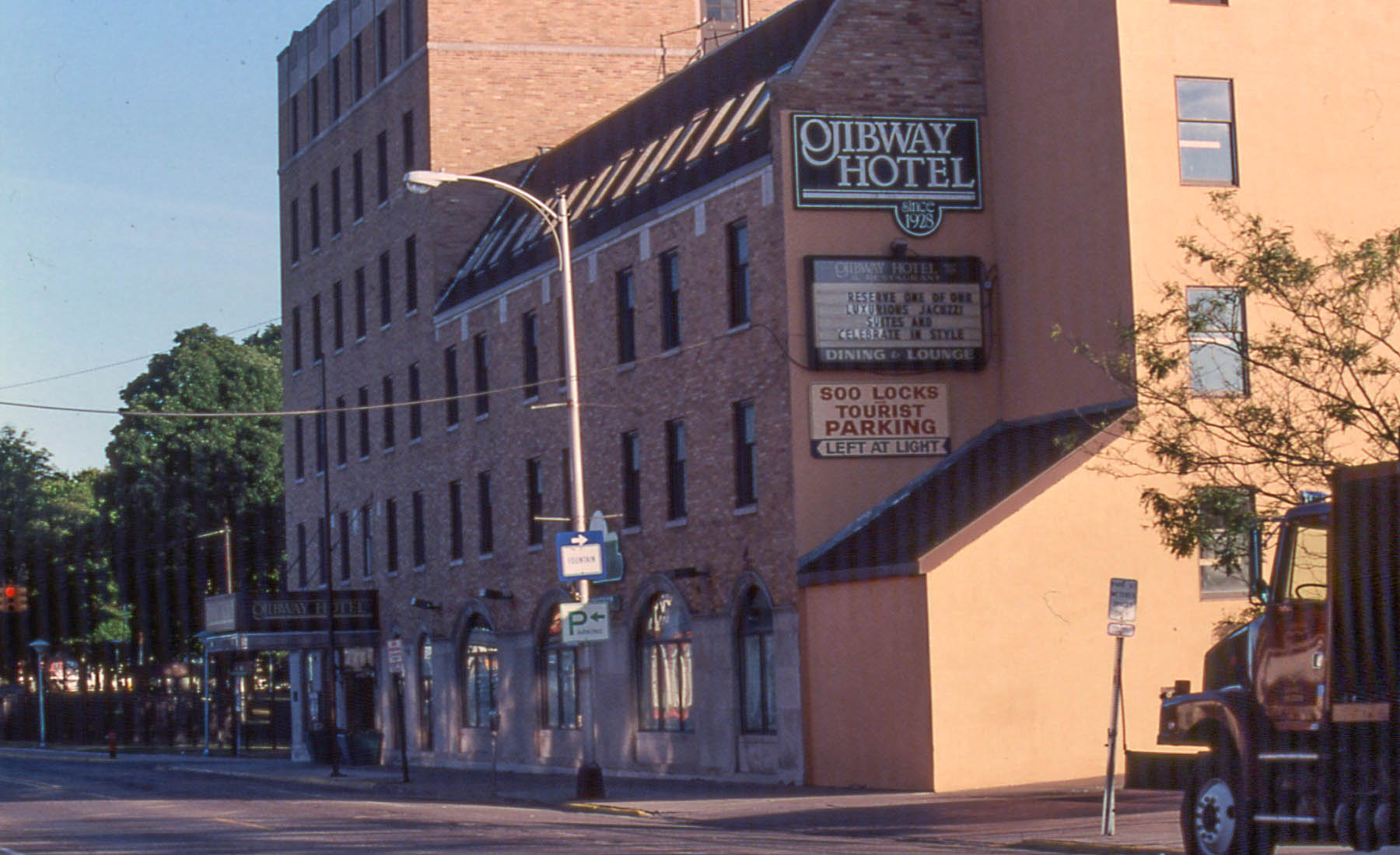
Ojibway Hotel

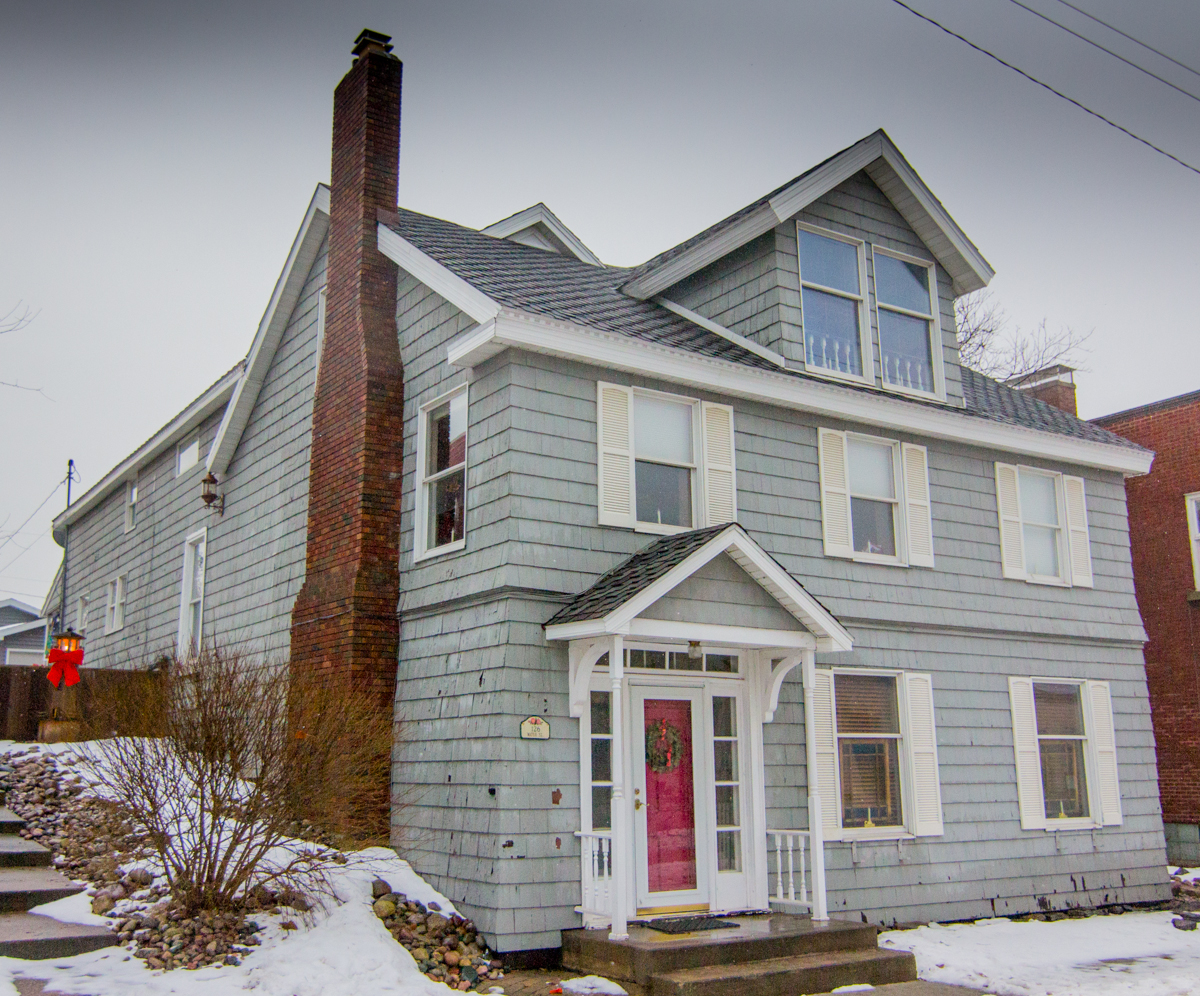
Allen House
