= Old Federal Building (Sault Ste. Marie) =

- Federal Building
- U.S. National Register of Historic Places
- U.S. Historic district – Contributing property
- Michigan State Historic Site
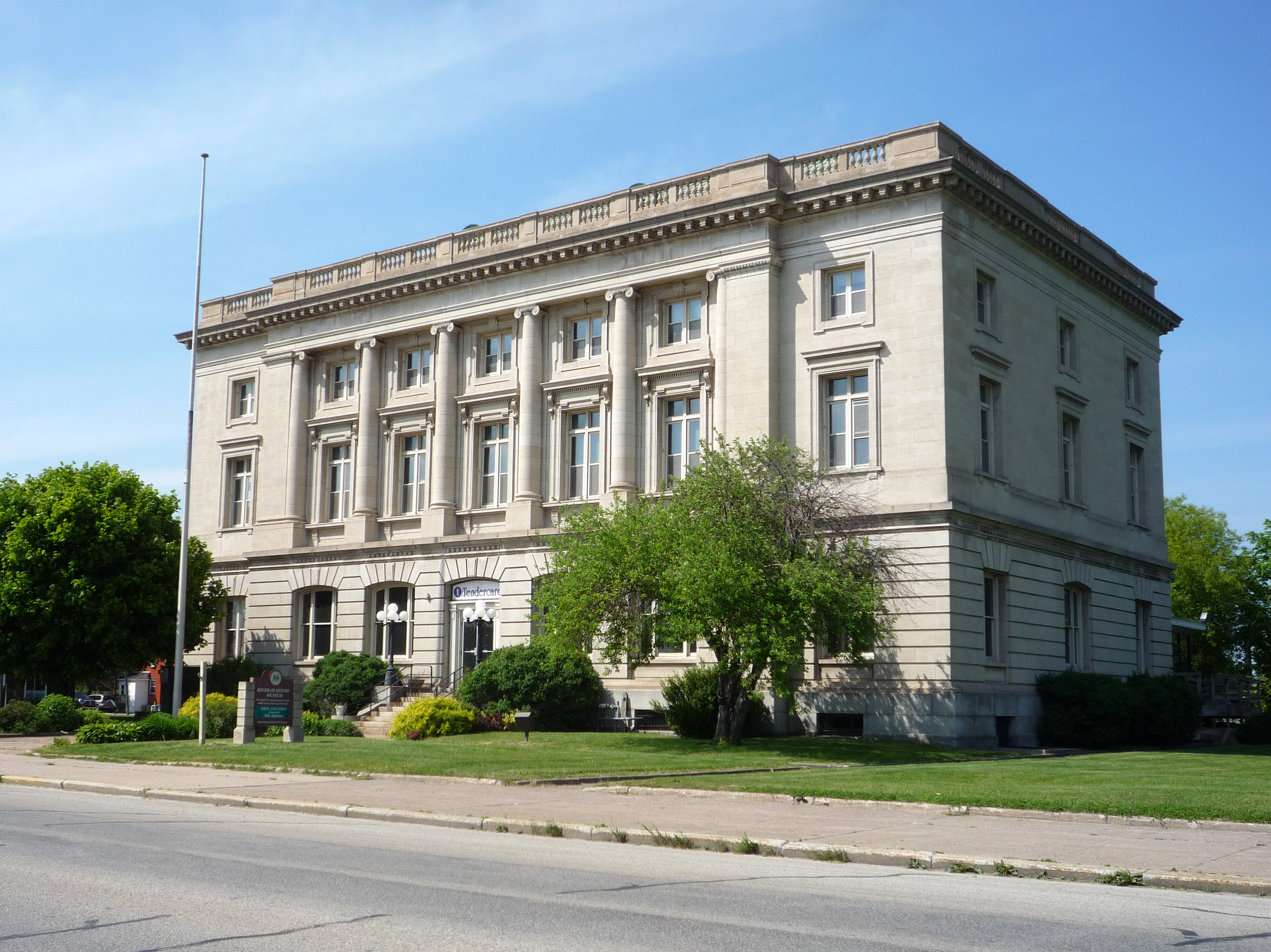

- Location within Michigan Location within the United States
- Interactive map
- Location: 209 E. Portage Avenue; Sault Ste. Marie, Michigan
- Coordinates: 46°29′58″N 84°20′33″W
- Built: 1909–1910
- Architect: James Knox Taylor
- Architectural style: Renaissance Revival
- Part of: Sault Ste. Marie Historic Commercial District (ID100005683)
- NRHP reference No.: 77000711

Significant dates
- Added to NRHP: September 9, 1977
- Designated MSHS: December 14, 1976

The United States Post Office (also known as the Old Federal Building) at 209 East Portage Avenue in Sault Ste. Marie, Michigan, is an historic building which has served various purposes since its construction in the early 20th century. The building was listed on the National Register of Historic Places on September 9, 1977.

== History ==
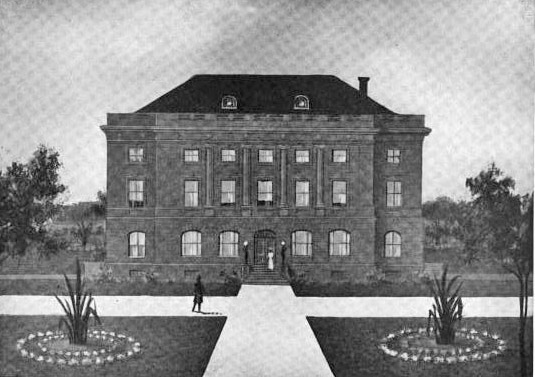
Federal Building, c. 1911

In 1822, Fort Brady was constructed on this site. In 1893, Federal troops abandoned the fort in favor of new location closer to the center of the Soo canal. The old fort site was reserved for the construction of a public building, and was used as a public commons until 1908, when Congress appropriated $150,000 for the construction of this Federal Building.

The building was constructed in 1909-1910 of limestone from a Bedford, Indiana quarry, using a design by James Knox Taylor, then Supervising Architect of the U.S. Treasury. It served for decades as a post office and a courthouse of the United States District Court for the Western District of Michigan, with the court meeting there from 1912 until 1941.

In 1992, the Sault Foundation for Culture and History acquired the building from the government, which had built a new facility for the courts, and converted it into the River of History Museum. This facility was to preserve and promote "the history of the St. Mary's River system". On July 1, 2009, the museum relocated, moving its exhibits to a new site. As of 2010, the building was renovated for use as office space as the City Hall.

== Description ==
The Old Federal Building is a rectangular three story limestone Renaissance Revival structure on a raised granite foundation. It measures 64 feet by 103 feet, and is seven bays wide. The first floor is built of smooth coursed limestone with horizontal recessed joints, above which is a carved frieze. On the main facade, the two upper floors are of plain limestone block, with Ionic columns running the full height of the second and third floors, framing the central five-bay fenestration. Slightly receding bats are on either side. An ornamental cornice tops the facade, above which is a low tin hipped roof.
