= Naomikong Point Site =

Archaeological site in Michigan, United States

- U.S. National Register of Historic Places
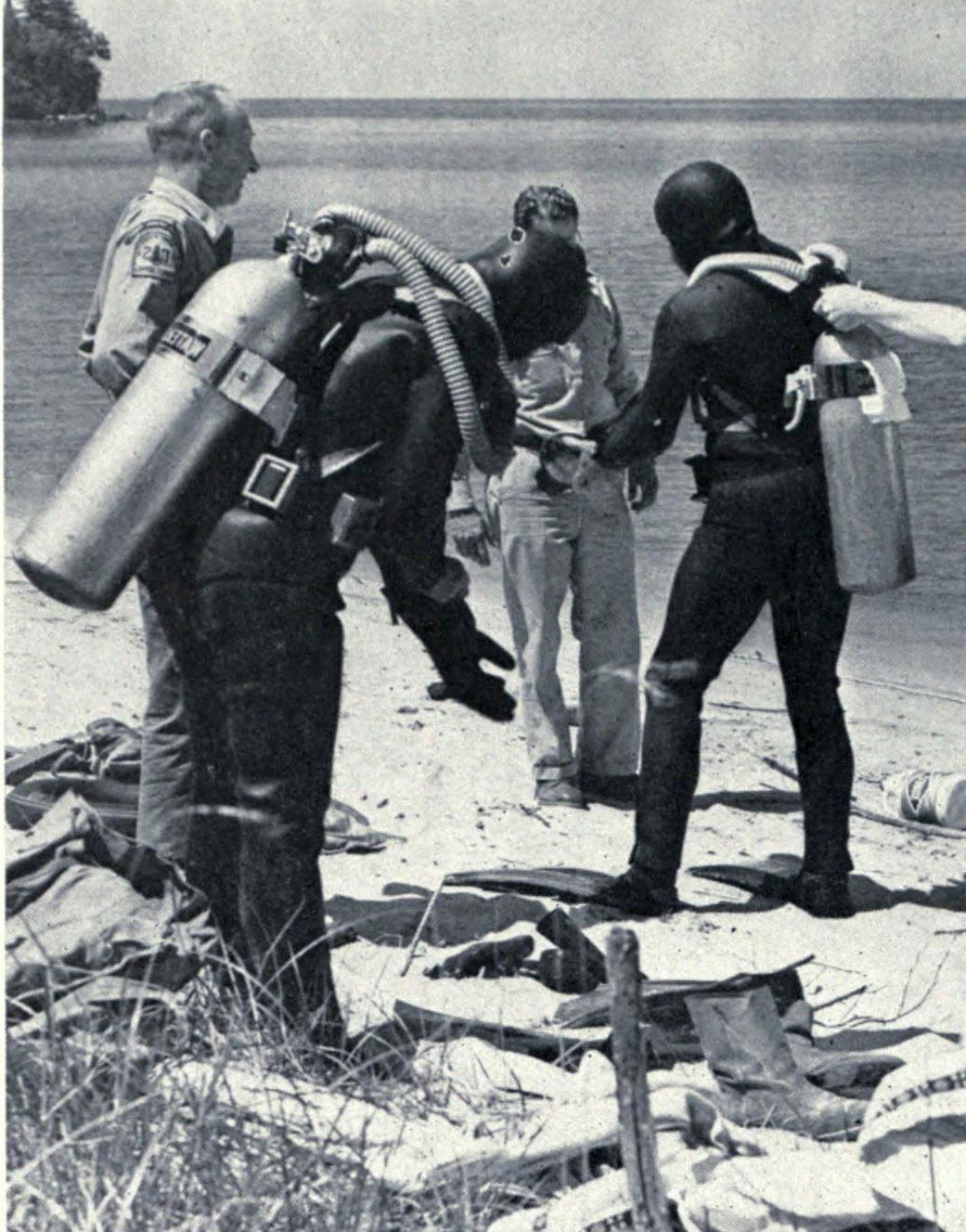
- Divers at Naomikong Point

- Location within Michigan Location within the United States
- Location: Naomikong Point, Bay Mills Township, Michigan
- Coordinates: 46°29′0″N 84°56′0″W
- Area: 1 acre (0.40 ha)
- Built: 1850
- NRHP reference No.: 71001020
- Added to NRHP: April 16, 1971

The Naomikong Point Site, also known as 20CH2, is a Late Woodland period Laurel site archaeological site located in Bay Mills Township, Michigan. It was listed on the National Register of Historic Places in 1971.

== Description ==
The Naomikong Point Laurel complex site is located on a small point on the south shore of Lake Superior in what is now a low meadow, but was a pine forest at the time the site was used. Some of what was once occupied area is now under the water slightly offshore. The site contained refuse and storage pits, as well as evidence of post molds thought to be from fish drying racks. This, along with other evidence, strongly suggests the people living here relied heavily on fishing. Radiocarbon dating indicated the site was populated at some point between about 100 CE and 900 CE. The site was likely used seasonally.

== Archeological History ==
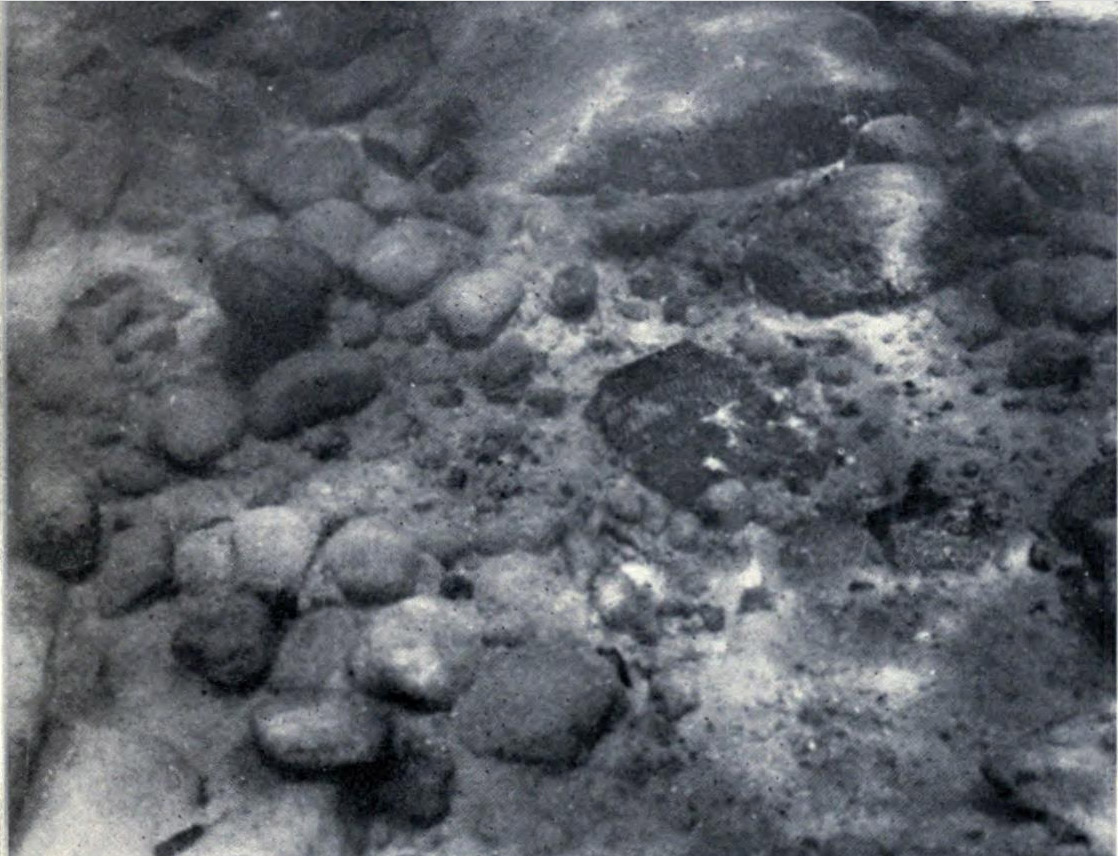
Pottery offshore

The Naomikong Point Site was brought to the attention of archaeologists by Charles Sprague Taylor, a lumberman and historian from Newberry, Michigan. It was surveyed by James Fitting in the 1960s, including underwater exploration just off shore in 1964. Additional work was done by Donald E. Janzen in 1967. Over 100,000 potsherds was recovered from the site, which came from at least 288 different vessels.
