= Chippewa County Courthouse =

- U.S. National Register of Historic Places
- U.S. Historic district – Contributing property
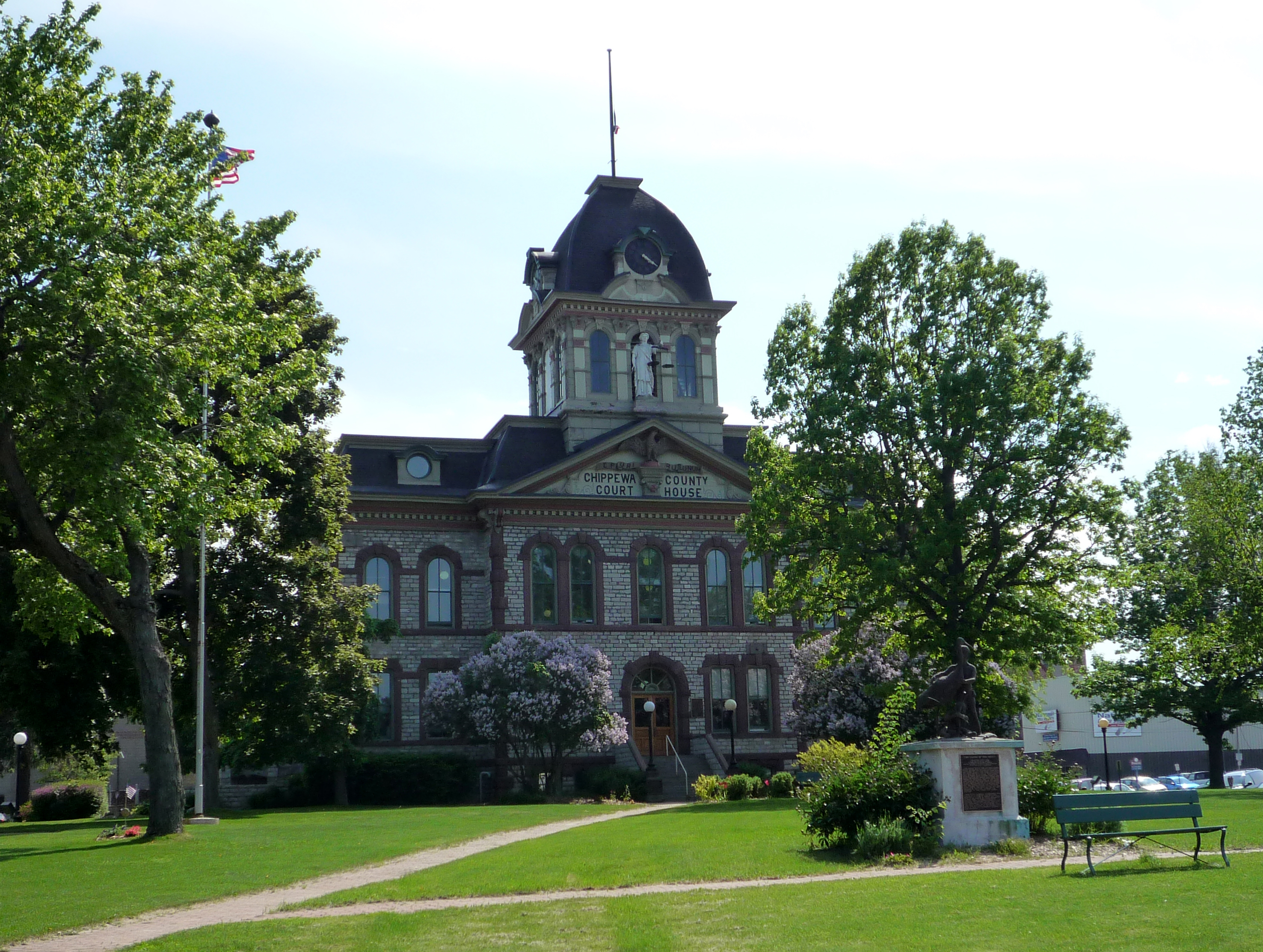

- Location within Michigan Location within the United States
- Interactive map showing the location of Chippewa County Courthouse
- Location: Court Street, Sault Ste. Marie, Michigan
- Coordinates: 46°29′53″N 84°20′44″W
- Area: 2.5 acres (1.0 ha)
- Built: 1877
- Architect: William Scott, R.C. Sweat
- Architectural style: Second Empire
- Part of: Sault Ste. Marie Historic Commercial District (ID100005683)
- NRHP reference No.: 84001381
- Added to NRHP: September 13, 1984

The Chippewa County Courthouse is a government building located on Court Street in Sault Ste. Marie, Michigan. It was listed on the National Register of Historic Places in 1984. It is one of the oldest courthouses still in use in Michigan.

== History ==
Chippewa County was split off from Michilimackinaw County (formed from the entire Upper Peninsula and part of the lower) in 1826. Sault Ste. Marie was chosen as the county seat. The Chippewa County Courthouse was built in 1877 for $20,000, using a design by Detroit architect William Scott and his son John. In 1904, a rear addition costing $25,000, designed by R. C. Sweat, was added to the structure. A second addition was constructed in approximately 1930.

In the 1980, the courthouse was completely renovated. Paint was stripped off woodwork, new doors and windows were installed, and the face of the tower clock was restored.

== Description ==
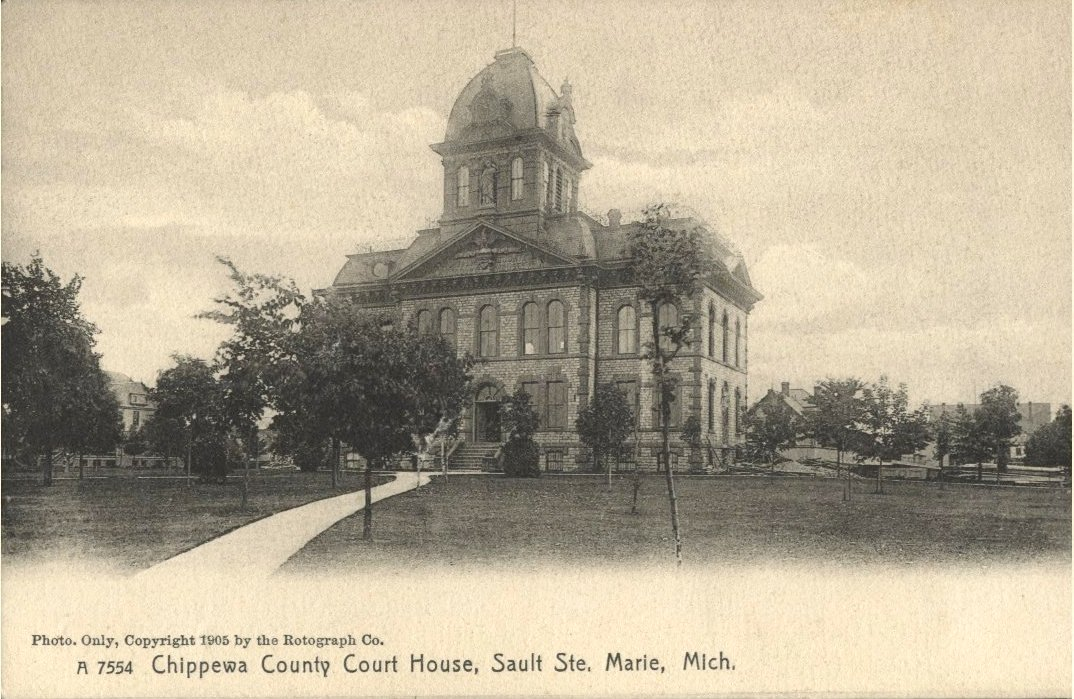
Courthouse, 1905

The Chippewa County Courthouse is a three-story Second Empire built of cut stone. The original courthouse was a rectangular plan; the 1904 addition made the whole structure into a T-plan. The Second Empire architectural style is consistent between the original courthouse and the later additions. The stone walls are two feet (0.61 m) thick, and the building features a contrasting, red-colored stone in beltcourses, quoins, lintels, and entryways. The center entrance is set in a slightly projecting pavilion topped with a pediment. Windows on the first floor have a segmented arch, while second-story windows are elliptically arched. Both the main structure and the clock tower are topped with a mansard roof; the roof was originally covered with slate but is now covered with asphalt shingles. Round windows were added to the mansard roof in 1904.

Inside, original stamped tin ceilings are still installed. Pillars inside the courtroom have ornate cast iron capitals, and the radiators are covered with grillwork.
