= Central Methodist Episcopal Church (Sault Ste. Marie, Michigan) =

Historic church in Michigan, United States

- U.S. National Register of Historic Places
- U.S. Historic district – Contributing property
- Michigan State Historic Site
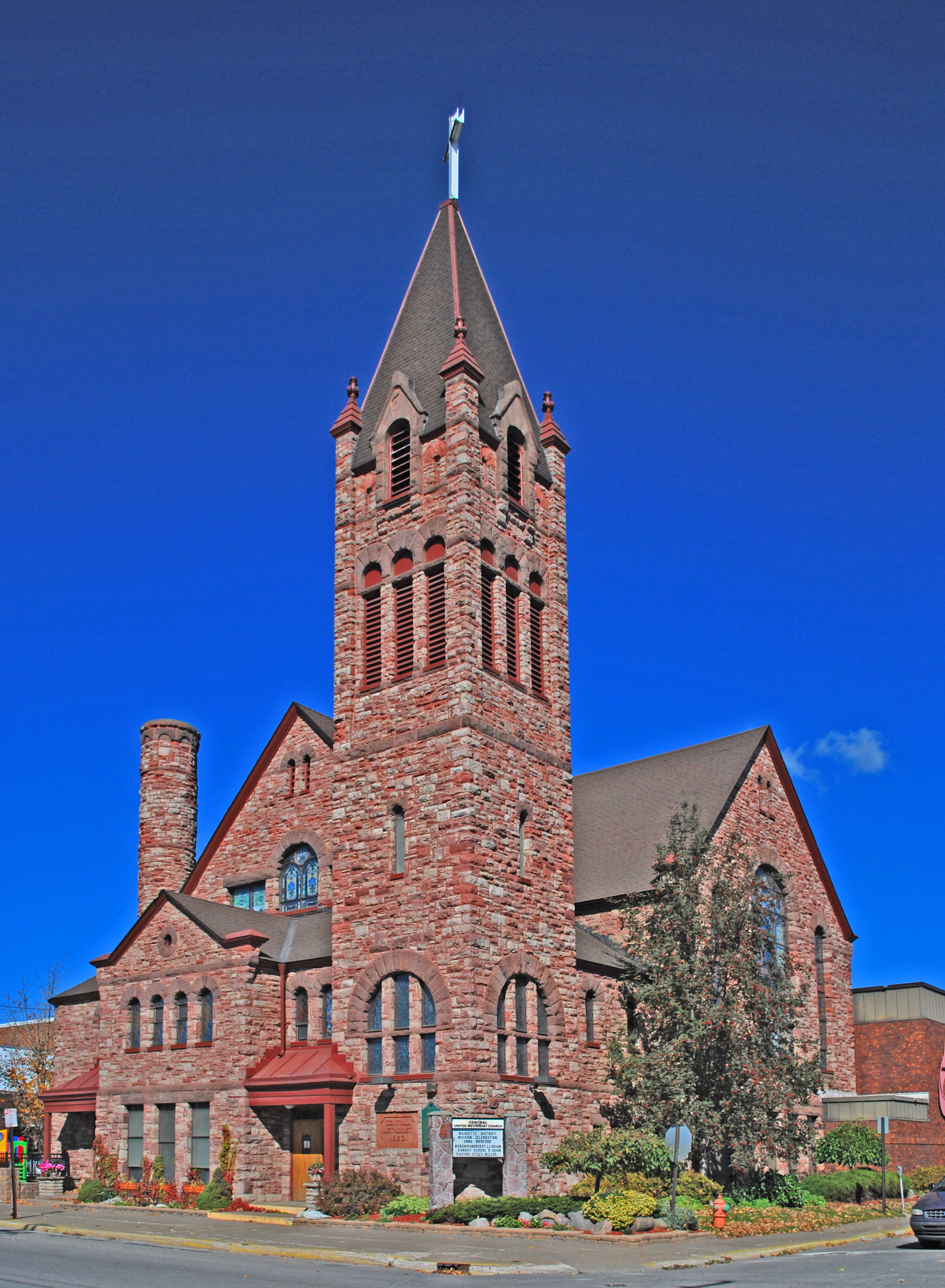

- Location within Michigan Location within the United States
- Interactive map
- Location: 111 E. Spruce St., Sault Ste. Marie, Michigan
- Coordinates: 46°29′52″N 84°20′47″W
- Area: less than one acre
- Built: 1894
- Architect: Dillon P. Clark
- Architectural style: Richardsonian Romanesque
- Part of: Sault Ste. Marie Historic Commercial District (ID100005683)
- NRHP reference No.: 84000537

Significant dates
- Added to NRHP: December 27, 1984
- Designated MSHS: June 17, 1993

Central Methodist Episcopal Church (now the Central United Methodist Church) is a United States historic church at 111 E. Spruce Street in Sault Ste. Marie, Michigan. It was listed on the National Register of Historic Places in 1984 and designated a Michigan State Historic Site in 1993.

== History ==
The first Methodist missionaries arrived in Sault Ste. Marie in 1833. Rev. John Clarke was appointed to serve in the Sault area, and in 1834 constructed a Methodist mission consisting of 13 log houses, a school, and a mission. Clarke soon travelled on to the Keweenaw Peninsula, and was succeeded by Rev. W. H. Brockway. Brockway was succeeded in 1843 by Rev. John H. Pitzel, ho stayed in the area until 1860. The mission was closed in 1864. Methodism essentially disappeared in the Sault until 1873, when Rev. Isaac Johnson was appointed to the area. Johnson formally established a Methodist congregation that year.

The first church building, only 20 feet (6.1 m) by 40 feet (12 m), was soon constructed on Portage Avenue. It was eventually moved to the site of the present church on Spruce. However, the congregation continued to grow, and the small church building underwent several expansions, including a large addition to the rear of the structure.

Still, by 1890, it was apparent that the congregation needed additional space, and it was determined that a new building was required. It was felt that the then-new church built in Owosso was of excellent design, and the Sault Ste. Marie congregation therefore hired the architect, Dillon P. Clark of Bay City, to design the new church. The original church was moved to the other side of Spruce Street, where it still stands, and construction of the new church began in 1892. The church was dedicated on July 1, 1894.

Three fires have occurred in the church. The first was in 1904, and completely destroyed the interior which had been refurbished the year before. A second, smaller fire occurred in 1934. A third fire occurred in 1941 during a World War II blackout. The interior of the church was again heavily damaged in this fire. However, despite interior damage, the exterior of the church remains almost unchanged from the original appearance.

Extensive repairs were made to the church in the mid-1950s. Plans for a new educational wing were drawn up in 1969, and the addition was constructed in 1970-71. The structure is still used by the Methodist congregation for worship.

== Description ==
The Sault Ste. Marie Central United Methodist Church is a multi-story Richardsonian Romanesque structure constructed of red sandstone discarded after an earlier, failed, attempt to construct a canal. The church is constructed in a cross-gable plan sitting on a raised foundation, with a broad roof and smaller gables attached to the main structure. The structure measures 75 feet (23 m) by 108 feet (33 m), and with three balconies can seat 1200 people. A large square tower with pyramidal roof is located in one corner; the tower contains unique arched windows on the first story and tall louvered windows on the upper levels. A circular turret with arched detail underneath its eaves is located on the opposite corner of the south facade. Between the tower and turret, small doorways on each side of a central pavilion are used to enter the church. The east facade includes a large set of stained glass in round head windows. A dark red stone beltcourse encircles the building. A two-story annex of modern design is attached in the rear.
