= Fort Brady =

- Old Fort Brady
- U.S. National Register of Historic Places
- Michigan State Historic Site
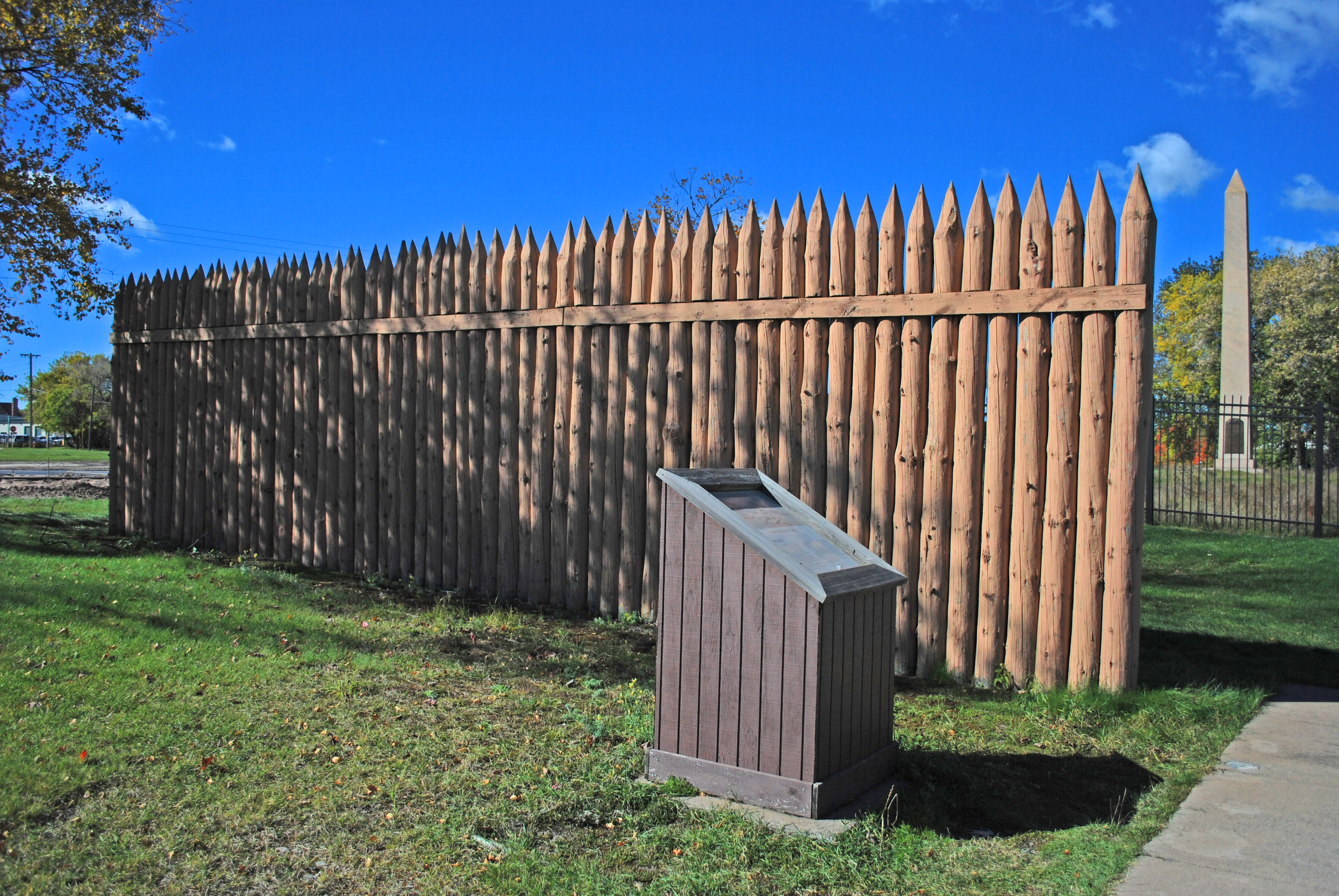
- Reconstruction of Old Fort Brady stockade
- Interactive map
- Location: Bounded by the C.O.E. Service Plaza on the N, Portage St. on the S, Brady St. on the E, and Bingham St. on the W, Sault Ste. Marie, Michigan
- Coordinates: 46°30′1.5″N 84°20′31″W
- Area: 10 acres (4.0 ha)
- Built: 1822
- NRHP reference No.: 71000387

Significant dates
- Added to NRHP: March 11, 1971
- Designated MSHS: August 23, 1956

- New Fort Brady
- U.S. National Register of Historic Places
- U.S. Historic district
- Michigan State Historic Site
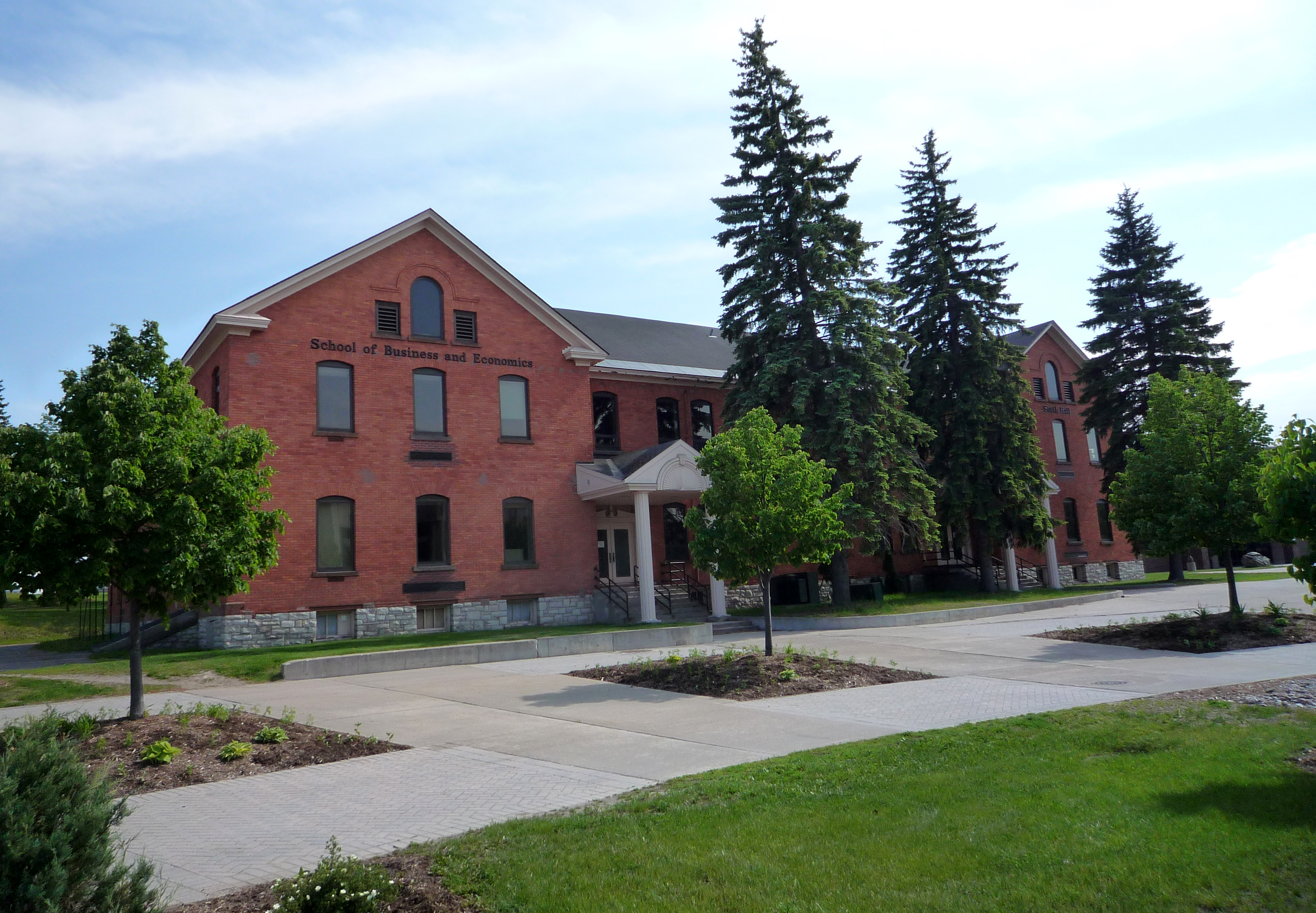
- Infantry barracks; now South Hall
- Interactive map
- Location: Lake Superior State College campus, Sault Ste. Marie, Michigan
- Coordinates: 46°29′34″N 84°21′50″W
- Area: 86 acres (35 ha)
- Built: 1892
- NRHP reference No.: 72000605

Significant dates
- Added to NRHP: January 13, 1972
- Designated MSHS: July 17, 1970

Fort Brady was a frontier fort established in Sault Sainte Marie, Michigan to guard against British incursions from Canada. The original location of the fort, known as Old Fort Brady, was along the Saint Mary's River. Fort Brady was located at this site from 1822 until 1893, when it was moved to a new location on higher ground, known as New Fort Brady. The fort was located at the new site from 1893 until its close in 1944. The site of Old Fort Brady was designated a Michigan State Historic Site in 1956 and listed on the National Register of Historic Places in 1971; New Fort Brady was designated a Michigan State Historic Site in 1970 and listed on the National Register of Historic Places in 1972.

== Establishment of Fort Brady ==
To enhance actual American control of the northwestern frontier against these incursions, especially in the wake of the War of 1812 against the British, the War Department decided to establish several forts along the Great Lakes. Despite several treaties with the British clearly establishing American sovereignty over Michigan Territory, British forces made occasional to frequent incursions from Canada. In 1820, Lewis Cass, governor of Michigan Territory, negotiated the cession of sixteen square miles along the Saint Mary's River (connecting Lake Superior with Lake Huron) from the Chippewa Nation.

In July 1822, Colonel Hugh Brady, with Headquarters and Companies A, B, D, I and K of the 2nd Infantry Regiment, traveled to the Sault to re-assert American authority over the region and establish a garrison there. By the end of the year, Brady had established a fort on a ten-acre site overlooking St. Marys River. The garrison at the fort protected exclusive American sovereignty over the northern frontier.

== "Old" Fort Brady ==
This original fort consisted of a rectangular stockade of cedar posts, with two blockhouses placed at opposite corners. Log buildings were constructed inside along three sides; these included barracks an officer's quarters. Stables and barns servicing the fort were located on the bank of the river, and a garden, garrison field, and cemetery were all located outside the stockade. The entire site covered 26 acres.

== Gallery ==
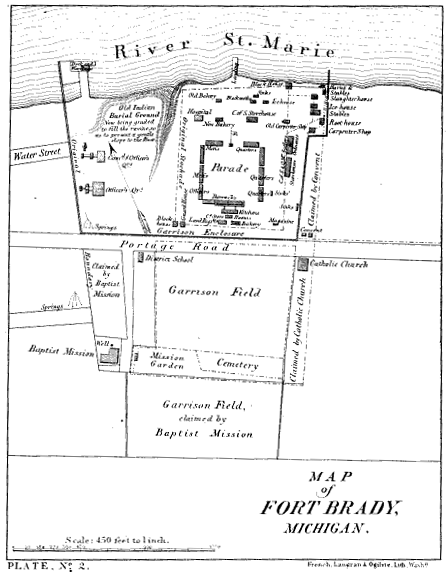
Map of Old Fort Brady, c. 1870

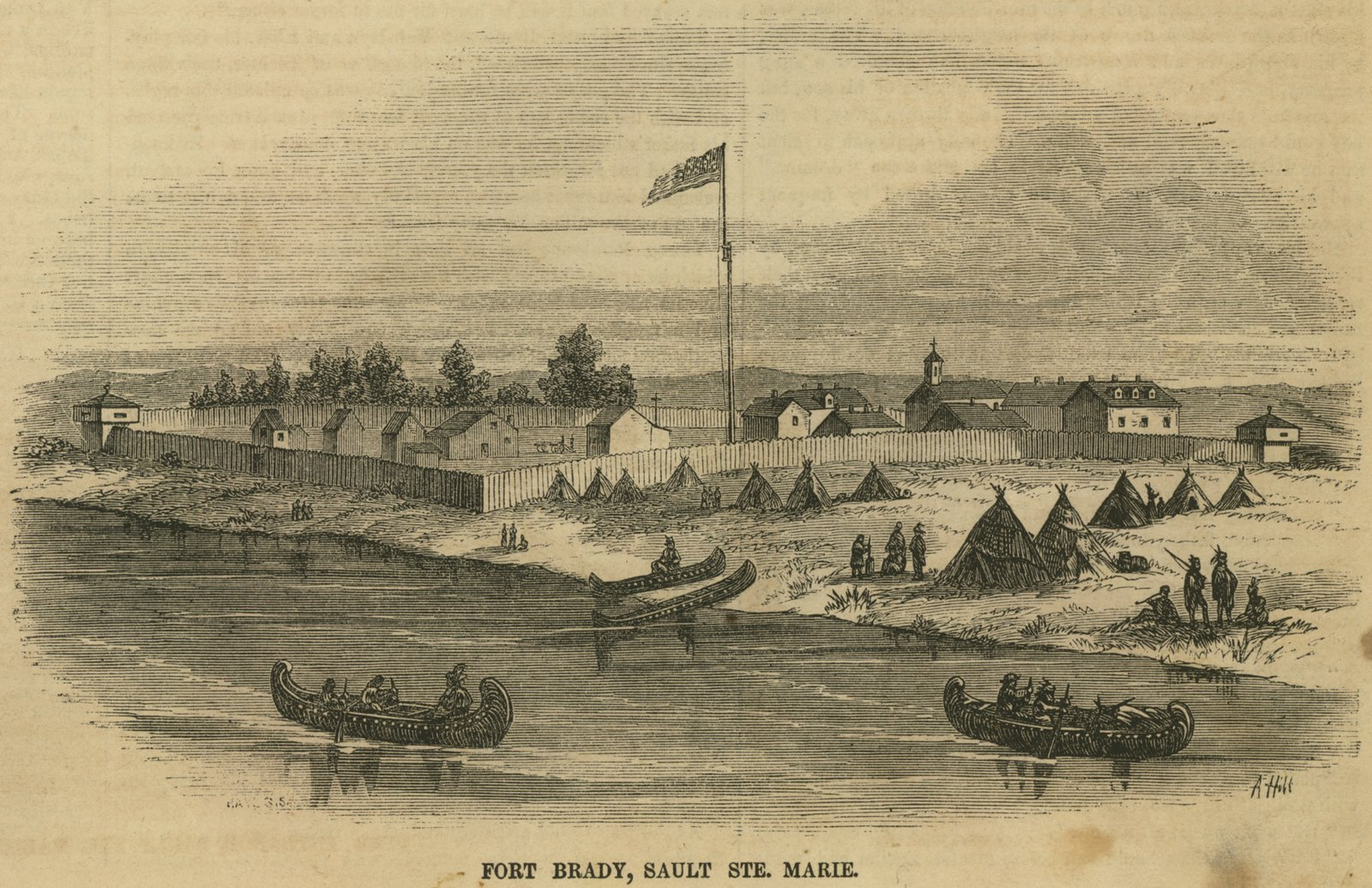
Old Fort Brady, c. 1857

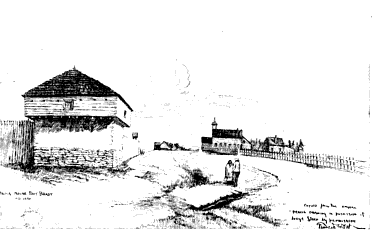
Sketch of Old Fort Brady Blockhouse

== Intermission ==
The American military presence at Fort Brady counteracted the influence of the British over the region, and their incursions ceased. The success of Colonel Hugh Brady at this mission earned him a promotion to brigadier general. No further armed conflict against the British occurred in the region, and the importance of Fort Brady was reduced. During the 1846–48 Mexican–American War, the Army withdrew troops and the fort was manned by Michigan volunteers. After the conclusion of the war, the volunteers left, and the fort was unoccupied until mid-1849, when US troops returned. The army again abandoned the fort in 1857, when, in response to potential hostilities, the troops were transferred to Fort Snelling in Minnesota.

However, realizing the locks were ripe for sabotage, the Army reoccupied Fort Brady in 1866, with the protection of state locks and canals as the center of the garrison's mission. By this time the buildings and stockade of the original fort were badly dilapidated, and the entire fort was enlarged and rebuilt, with only two structures, the officer's quarters (changed to a hospital) and guardhouse (changed to a bakery), remaining.

In about 1870, the fort consisted of

- a two-story barracks, 120 feet (37 m) by 24 feet (7.3 m)
- kitchen
- commissary
- bakery (built in 1822 as a guard house)
- guardhouse, 24 feet 6 inches (7.47 m) by 22 feet 6 inches (6.86 m), built in 1867
- hospital (built in 1822 as officer's quarters)
- commanding officer's quarters, 32 feet (9.8 m) by 42 feet 9 inches (13.03 m)
- staff officer's quarters, 52 feet (16 m) by 56 feet (17 m), built in 1866

== Transition ==
In the late 1800s, the shipping canal at Sault Ste. Marie was widened, and the original site of Fort Brady was no longer deemed adequate. General Philip Sheridan selected a more strategic site nearby, on higher ground, and in 1886 work began on constructing a new fort. The new fort, known as "New Fort Brady," was completed in 1893.

The old fort grounds were platted by Assistant Quartermaster George S. Hoyt, and in 1894 sections were auctioned off. In 1909–1910 a post office was built on the site. There is now no visible trace remaining of the original fort. However, archaeologists have found evidence of three walls in the area, and a small re-creation of the stockade wall marks the original location of the fort. In 1970 the site of Old Fort Brady was declared surplus by the US government.

== "New" Fort Brady ==
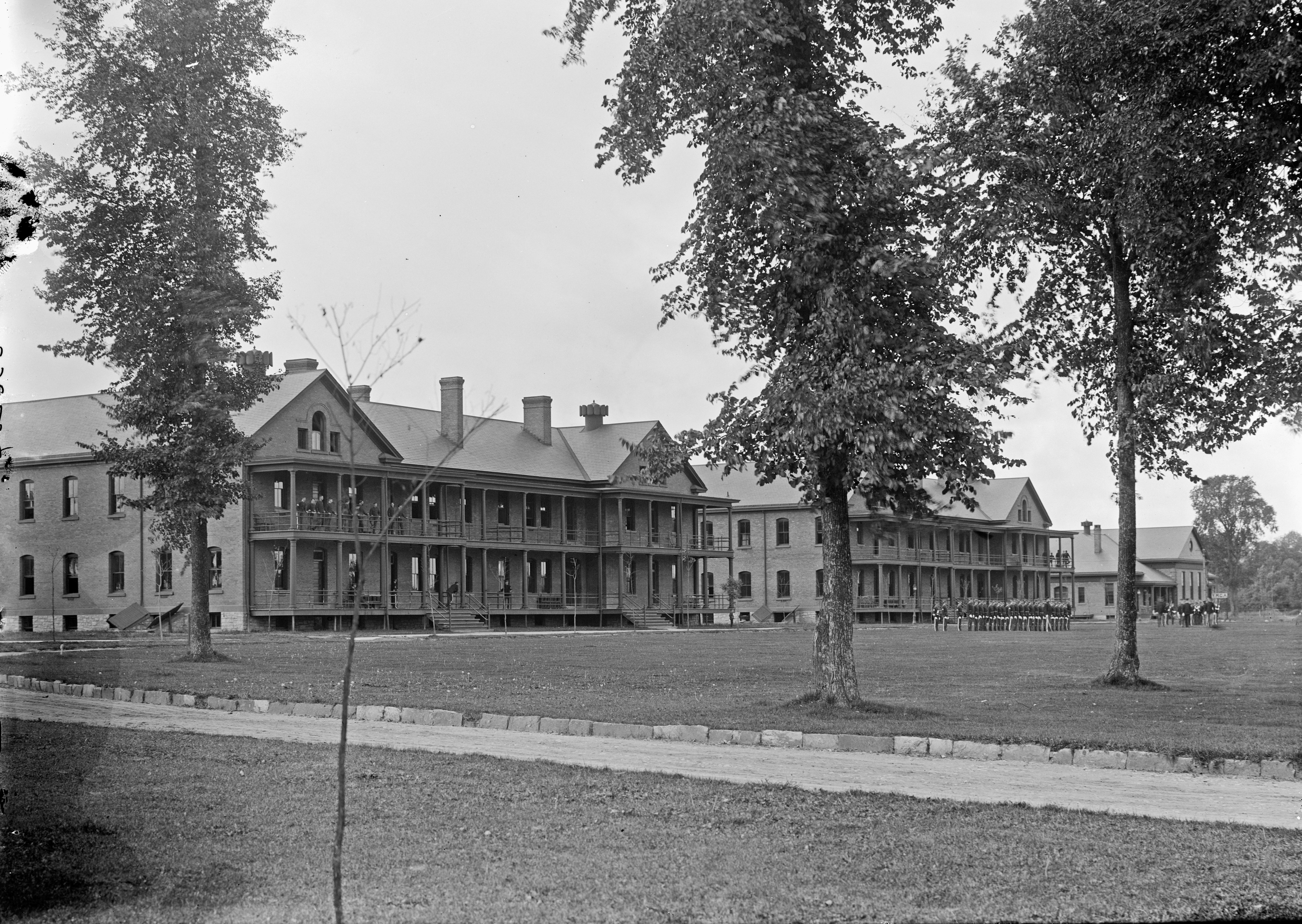
Fort Brady Barracks c. 1908

The original site of New Fort Brady consisted on 64 buildings sited on 73 acres. Fourteen of these buildings still exist. They are:

- Officers Row: The officer's row houses were constructed in the 1890s or early 1900s as housing for the garrison's officers, including the commanding officer. The commandant's quarters is now the residence of the president of Lake Superior State University. Other officer's row houses include the student residences now known as Ontario Hall, Huron Hall, Chippewa Hall, and Laker Hall; as well as The Native American Center (Eskoonwid Endaad) and Hillside House, which houses the Admissions Office.
- Guardhouse: The guardhouse was built in the 1890s as a guardhouse and stockade. It is now known as East Hall, and is occupied by the Music Department.
- Infantry Barracks: The infantry barracks were constructed in 1903 to house infantry soldiers. The barracks were originally two identical buildings; the second was destroyed by fire in the 1960s. The remaining barracks building is now known as Considine Hall, and houses the College of Business and Economics.
- Post Headquarters: The post headquarters was built in the early 1900s as officer's housing and headquarters. It is now known as "Brown Hall," and houses Lake Superior State's Department of Education.
- Fire House: The fire house was built in the early 1900s. It is now the Child Care Center.
- Post Office: The post office was built in 1920 to house the fort's post office and quartermaster troops. The building was remodeled in the 1940s into an office building, and is now known as the Administration Building. The structure houses the Offices of the President, Provost, and Employee Relations.
- East Gate: The East Gate and associated gatehouse were constructed in 1921 as the main entrance to the fort. The gatehouse now houses electrical equipment.
- WACS Barracks: This structure constructed in the 1930s to serve as barracks for the Women's Army Corps. It is now used as a residence hall, and is known as Brady Hall, so named in honor of the first commander of Fort Brady.
- Gymnasium: The gymnasium was built in the 1930s as a gymnasium. The building was used by Lake Superior State for athletic events and other school functions until 1976. The building, now known as the Fletcher Center, was then converted to house university offices, including Student Services, Financial Aid and the Registrar.

== Later history ==
The primary responsibility of the post at New Fort Brady was to protect the canal. Troops from the fort assisted during civil unrest in 1894, and during the Spanish–American War of 1898, two thousand troops passed through the fort for training.

During World War II, 15,000 troops lived at Fort Brady, necessitating various temporary and not-so-temporary construction of habitations and facilities. The 2nd Infantry Division conducted cold-weather training at the fort to determine what equipment would be necessary.

In 1944, before the end of World War II, the Army decided to close the fort as surplus. In 1946, the Army gave the fort to the Michigan College of Mining and Technology (now Michigan Technological University), who established a branch campus at the site. After renovation, the fort was sold to Lake Superior State College (now Lake Superior State University). Many of the original buildings have been replaced, but the major buildings of New Fort Brady have been well-maintained and form the heart of the campus. These buildings are now row houses, the Administration building, Fletcher Center, Brady Hall, South Hall, Brown Hall, East Hall and the Child Care Center.
