= Brimley Area Schools =

School district in Michigan, United States

Address
- 7134 S M-221 Brimley, Chippewa County, Michigan, 49715; United States

District information
- Grades: PreKindergarten–12
- Superintendent: Thomas Suggitt
- Schools: 1
- Budget: $9,910,000 2022–2023 expenditures
- NCES District ID: 2606900

Students and staff
- Students: 463 (2024–2025)
- Teachers: 36.39 (on an FTE basis) (2024–2025)
- Staff: 62.09 FTE (2024–2025)
- Student–teacher ratio: 12.72 (2024–2025)
- District mascot: Bays

Other information
- Website: brimley.eupschools.org

Brimley Area Schools is a public school district in Chippewa County, in the Upper Peninsula of Michigan. It serves Brimley and the townships of Bay Mills, Chippewa, Superior, and part of Dafter Township.

== History ==
Brimley's former school had become crowded by 1954, when the district proposed a bond issue to build a seven-room elementary school annex. The local newspaper published letters from students on the subject of why a new school was needed as part of a letter-writing contest. The winner in the high school group mentioned cold, dim basement classrooms and the threat of losing accreditation by the University of Michigan due to poor facilities. The winner of the elementary school group said:

When the high school children come down the stairs the stairs just shake and feel as if they are going to fall in. The rooms are stuffy and crowded. They are not healthy either. There is not enough heat in the winter and when it rains the rain comes in through the windows and under the floors.

Voters passed the bond issue. The high school, then called Superior High School, would remain in the old building until about 1960, when a new high school section was built, resolving the problem of the outdated school. A bond issue in 1999 paid for an addition to the building.

The district serves the Bay Mills Indian Community, and more than half of the students are Native American. Ojibwe culture and literature is integrated into the curriculum.

== School ==
Brimley Area Schools operates a single school that serves all grades. It is located at 7134 South M-221 in Brimley.
