= List of casinos in Michigan =

This is a list of casinos in Michigan. Gambling has been legal in Michigan since the 1980s. The state is home to 26 land-based casinos, 23 of which are Indian casinos and 3 are commercial casinos in Detroit.

== Online casinos ==
As well as legal land-based gambling, those living in or visiting Michigan can now sign up and play at online casinos. On December 20, 2019, Governor Gretchen Whitmer signed Bill 4311 and legalized online gambling within state lines. The Michigan Gaming Control Board (MGCB) was then formed, and in late 2020 the MGCB issued licenses, giving online casinos the go-ahead to launch at the state of 2021.

Despite the 2019 legalization, unregulated offshore casinos are a growing problem across the United States. In April 2025, the Michigan Gaming Control Board (MGCB) took action against 13 websites that were found to be unlawfully targeting Michigan residents. This action was a strong message to offshore operators, with a statement from The Board reading: "The MGCB’s action serves as a firm warning to illegal offshore operators attempting to skirt Michigan’s legal framework."

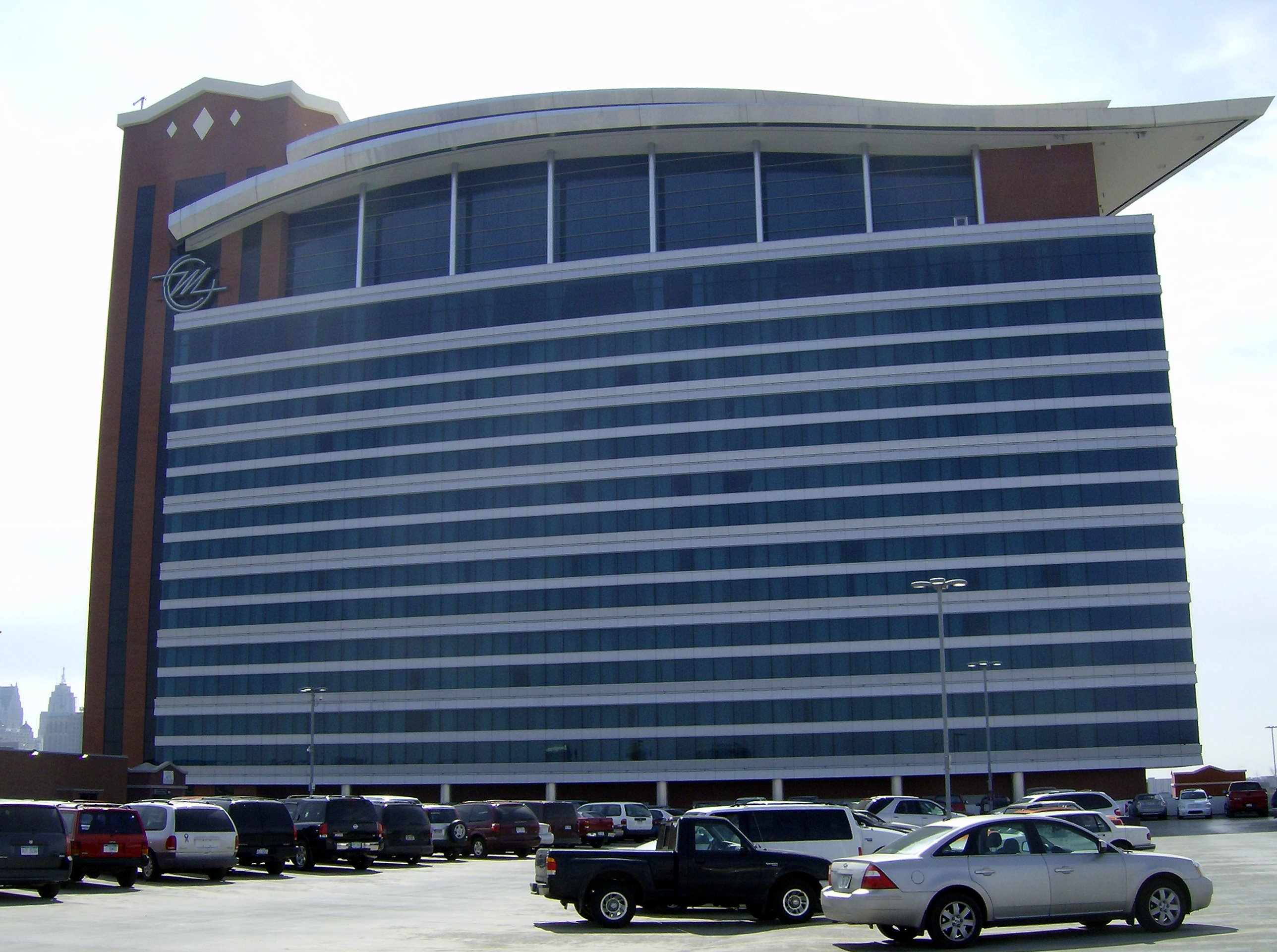
MotorCity Casino Hotel

== List of casinos ==
List of casinos in the U.S. state of Michigan
Casino	City	County	State	District	Type	Comments
Bay Mills Resort & Casino	Brimley	Chippewa	Michigan		Native American	Owned by the Bay Mills Indian Community
FireKeepers Casino Hotel	Battle Creek	Calhoun	Michigan		Native American	Owned by the Nottawaseppi Huron Band of Potawatomi
Four Winds New Buffalo	New Buffalo	Berrien	Michigan		Native American	Owned by the Pokagon Band of Potawatomi Indians
Four Winds Hartford	Hartford	Van Buren	Michigan		Native American	Owned by the Pokagon Band of Potawatomi Indians
Four Winds Dowagiac	Dowagiac	Cass	Michigan		Native American	Owned by the Pokagon Band of Potawatomi Indians
Gun Lake Casino	Wayland	Allegan	Michigan		Native American	Owned by the Match-e-be-nash-she-wish Band of Pottawatomi Indians of Michigan
Hollywood Casino at Greektown	Detroit	Wayne	Michigan		Land-based
Island Resort & Casino	Bark River	Menominee	Michigan		Native American	Owned by the Hannahville Indian Community
Kewadin Casino - Christmas	Christmas	Alger	Michigan		Native American	Owned by the Sault Tribe of Chippewa Indians
Kewadin Casino - Hessel	Hessel	Mackinac	Michigan		Native American	Owned by the Sault Tribe of Chippewa Indians
Kewadin Casino - Manistique	Manistique	Schoolcraft	Michigan		Native American	Owned by the Sault Tribe of Chippewa Indians
Kewadin Casino, Hotel and Convention Center	Sault Sainte Marie	Chippewa	Michigan		Native American	Owned by the Sault Tribe of Chippewa Indians
Kewadin Shores Casino - St. Ignace	St Ignace	Mackinac	Michigan		Native American	Owned by the Sault Tribe of Chippewa Indians
Kings Club Casino	Brimley	Chippewa	Michigan		Native American	Owned by the Bay Mills Indian Community
Leelanau Sands Casino	Suttons Bay	Leelanau	Michigan		Native American	Owned by the Grand Traverse Band of Ottawa and Chippewa Indians
Little River Casino and Resort	Manistee	Manistee	Michigan		Native American	Owned by the Little River Band of Ottawa Indians
MGM Grand Detroit	Detroit	Wayne	Michigan		Land-based
MotorCity Casino Hotel	Detroit	Wayne	Michigan		Land-based
Northern Waters Casino Resort	Watersmeet	Gogebic	Michigan		Native American	Owned by the Lac Vieux Desert Band of Lake Superior Chippewa
Odawa Casino Mackinaw	Mackinaw City	Cheboygan	Michigan		Native American	Owned by the Little Traverse Bay Bands of Odawa Indians
Odawa Casino Resort	Petoskey	Emmet	Michigan		Native American	Owned by the Little Traverse Bay Bands of Odawa Indians
Ojibwa Casino - Marquette	Marquette	Marquette	Michigan		Native American	Owned by the Keweenaw Bay Indian Community
Ojibwa Casino Resort - Baraga	Baraga	Baraga	Michigan		Native American	Owned by the Keweenaw Bay Indian Community
Saganing Eagles Landing Casino	Standish	Arenac	Michigan		Native American	Owned by the Saginaw Chippewa Tribal Nation
Soaring Eagle Casino & Resort	Mt. Pleasant	Isabella	Michigan		Native American	Owned by the Saginaw Chippewa Tribal Nation
Turtle Creek Casino and Hotel	Williamsburg	Grand Traverse	Michigan		Native American	Owned by the Grand Traverse Band of Ottawa and Chippewa Indians

== Gallery ==
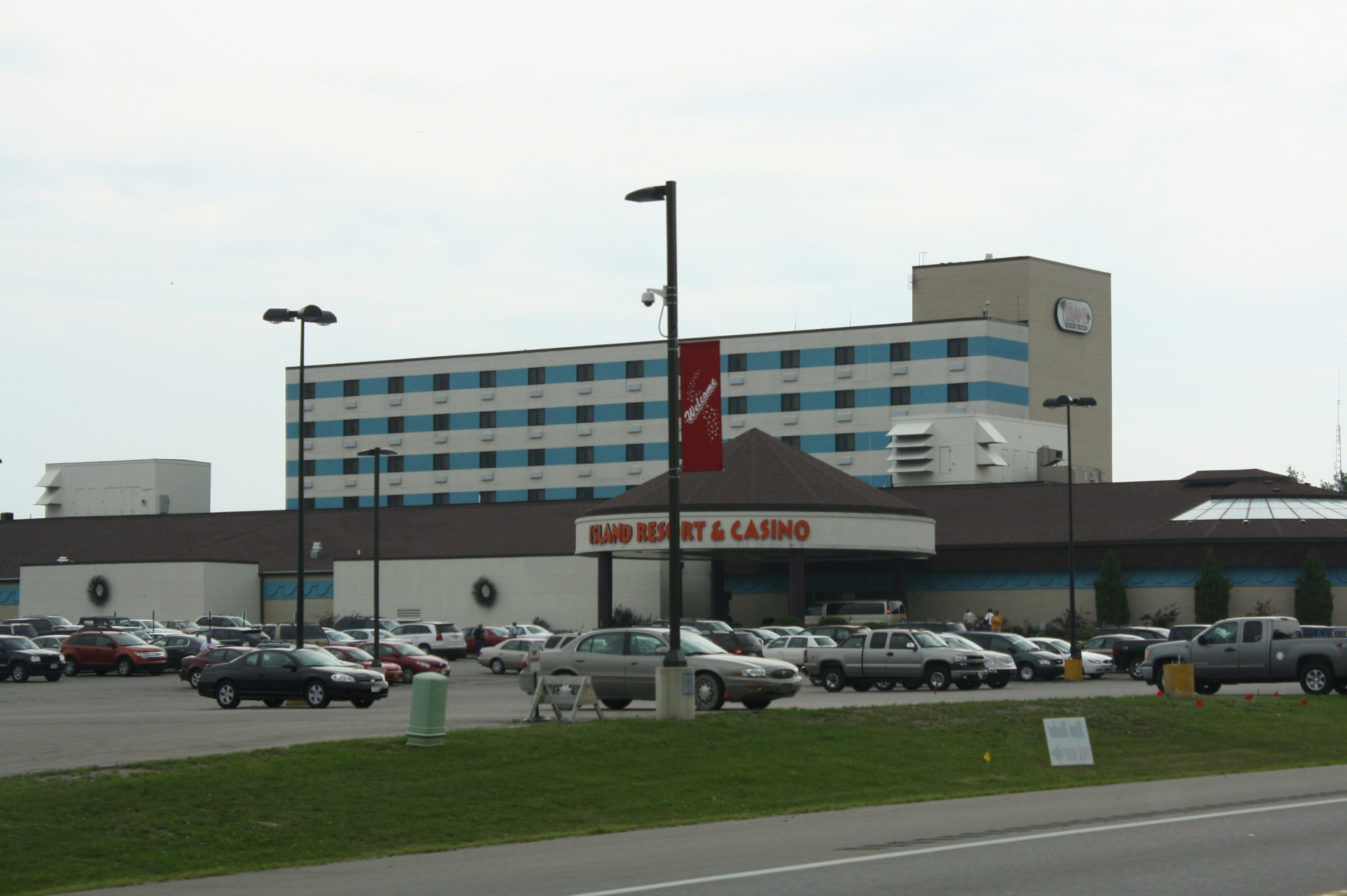
Island Resort & Casino

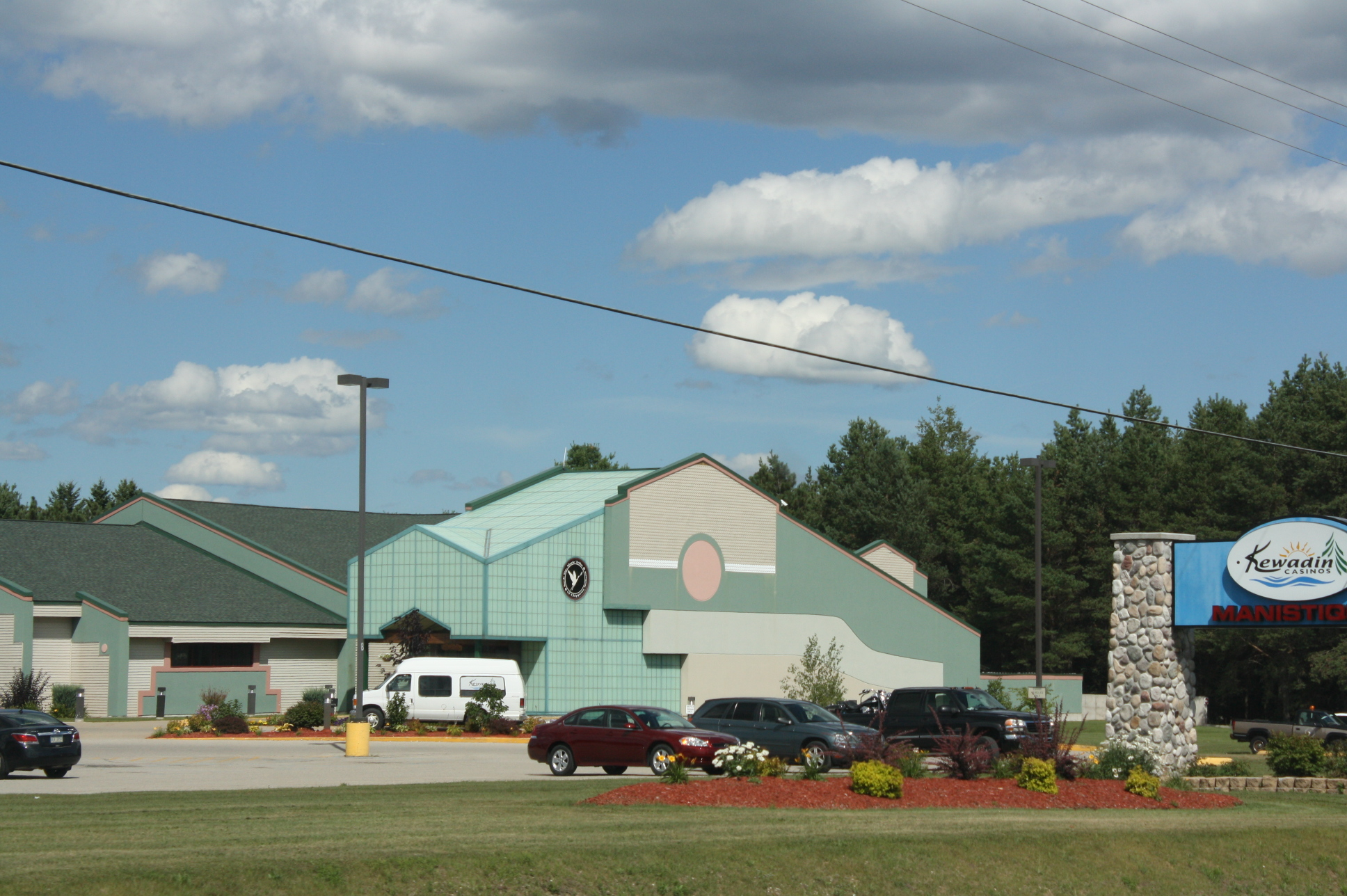
Kewadin Casino by Manistique

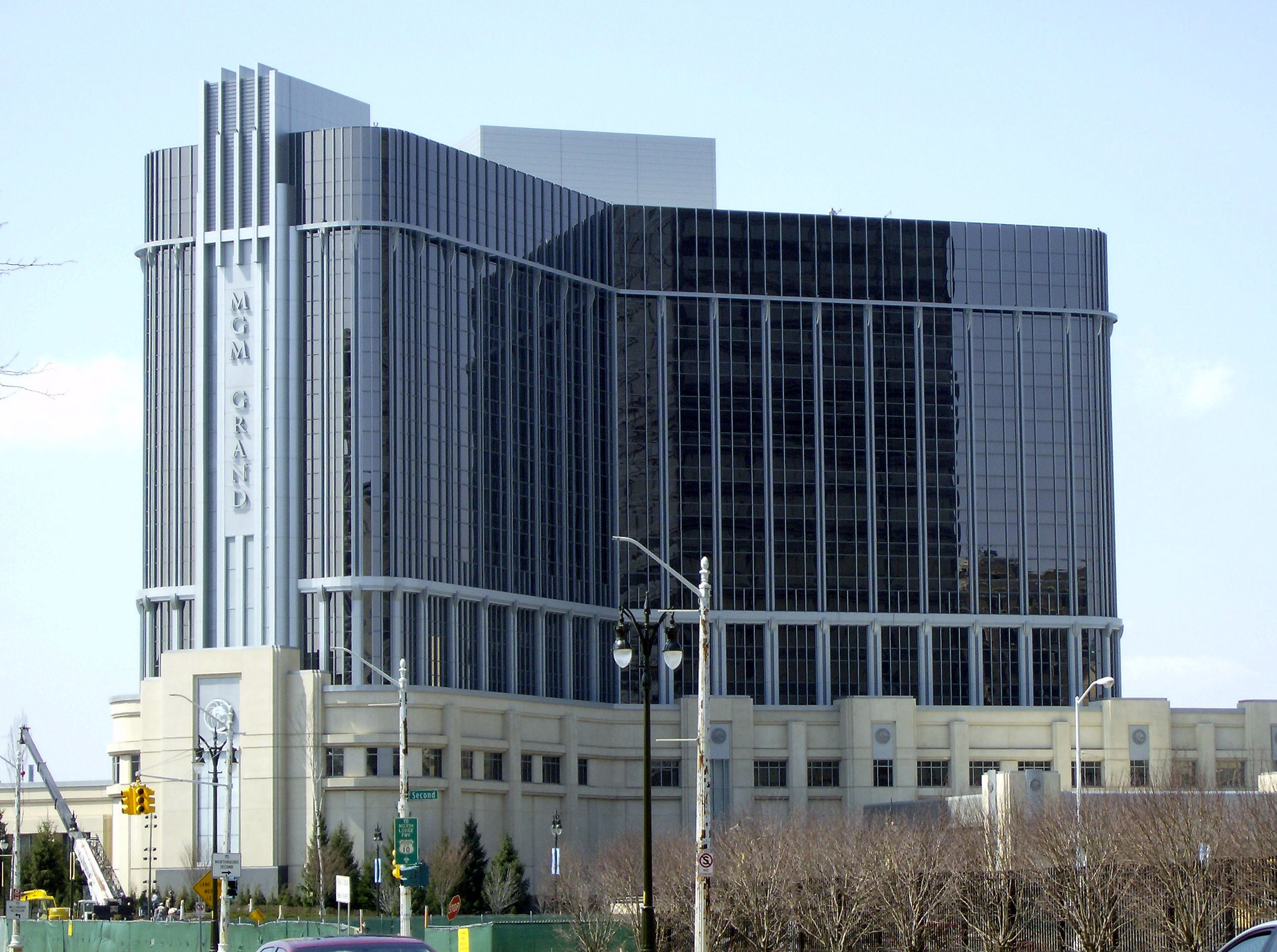
MGM Grand Detroit

== See also ==
- List of casinos in the United States
- List of casino hotels
- Michigan Gaming Control Board
