= Kinross Charter Township, Michigan =

- Charter township
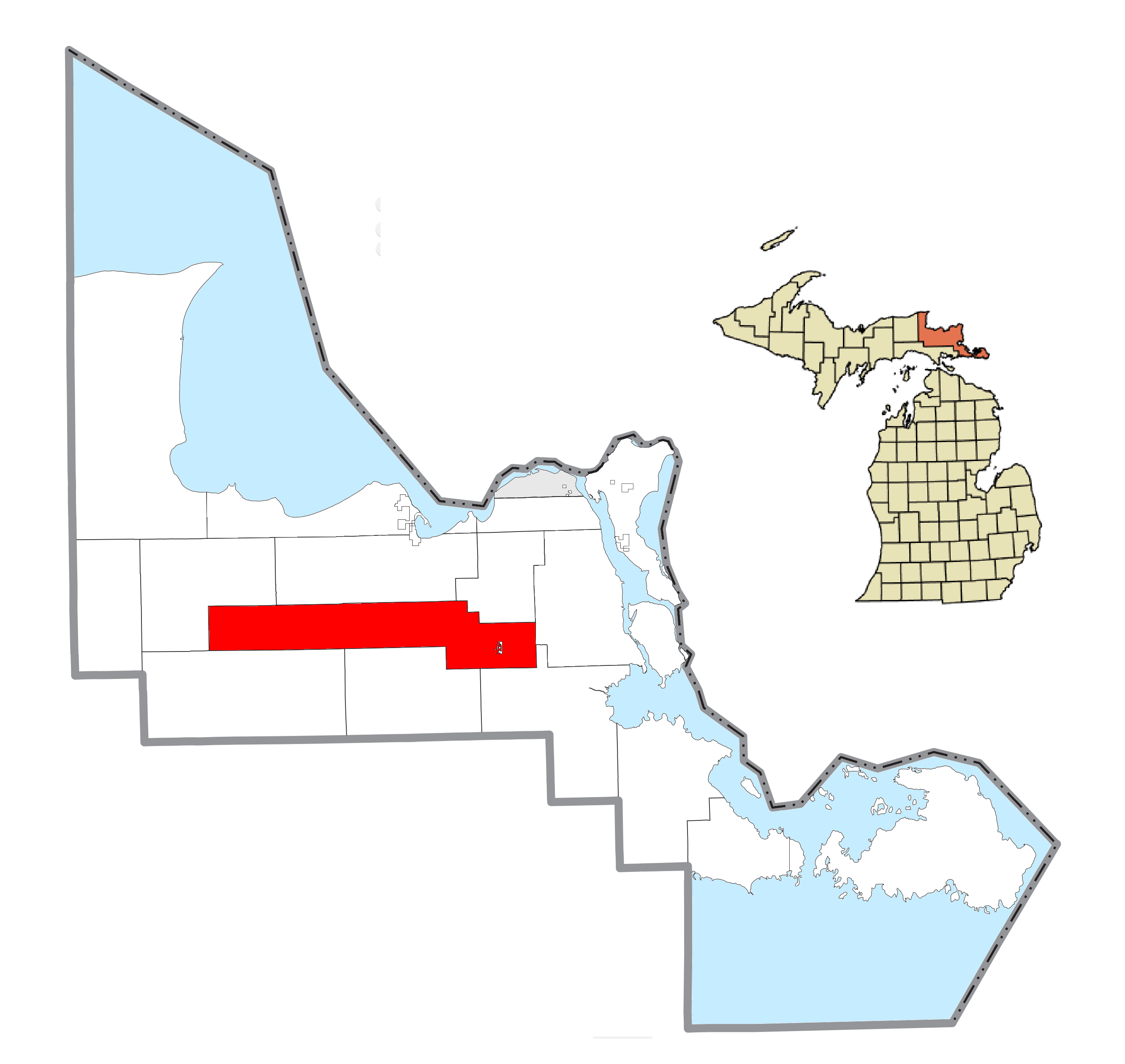
- Location within Chippewa County

- Location within the state of Michigan
- Coordinates: 46°16′52″N 84°34′36″W
- Country: United States
- State: Michigan
- County: Chippewa

Government
  - Supervisor: Jim Moore

Area
  - Total: 120.9 sq mi (313.2 km^{2})
  - Land: 119.7 sq mi (310.1 km^{2})
  - Water: 1.2 sq mi (3.1 km^{2})
- Elevation: 702 ft (214 m)

Population (2020)
  - Total: 6,139
  - Density: 51.27/sq mi (19.80/km^{2})
- Time zone: UTC-5 (Eastern (EST))
  - Summer (DST): UTC-4 (EDT)
- ZIP code(s): 49715 (Brimley); 49724 (Dafter); 49728 (Eckerman); 49752 (Kinross); 49780 (Rudyard); 49788 (Kincheloe)
- Area code: 906
- FIPS code: 26-43480
- GNIS feature ID: 1626563
- Website: Official website

Kinross Charter Township is a charter township of Chippewa County in the U.S. state of Michigan. The population was 6,139 at the 2020 census, down from 7,561 at the 2010 census.

== Geography ==
The township is located in the eastern part of the Upper Peninsula of Michigan, 18 miles (29 km) south of Sault Ste. Marie and 33 miles (53 km) north of St. Ignace.

According to the US Census Bureau, the township has a total area of 120.9 square miles (313.2 km^{2}), of which 119.7 square miles (310.1 km^{2}) is land and 1.2 square miles (3.1 km^{2}), or 1.00%, is water.

== Communities ==
- Kincheloe, is an unincorporated area and census-designated place located in the eastern part of the township just east of Interstate 75, is on part of the former Kincheloe Air Force Base, which was deactivated in 1977. It has a US Post Office (49788).
- Kinross is the unincorporated area in the eastern end of Kinross Charter Township outside of Kincheloe. Its US Post Office (49752) is located adjacent to Interstate 75, west-northwest of Kincheloe.

== Demographics ==
As of the 2000 United States census, there were 5,922 people, 1,156 households, and 887 families in the township.

== Transportation ==
- Chippewa County International Airport, on a portion of the previous Kincheloe Air Force Base, provides regional airline service to the area.
- Indian Trails provides daily intercity bus service between St. Ignace and Ironwood, Michigan.

== Historic sites ==
The old Kinross Township Hall and School, located in Kinross, is listed on the National Register of Historic Places.
