= M-221 (Michigan highway) =

State highway in Superior Township, Chippewa County, Michigan, United States

M-221
- M-221 highlighted in red

Route information
- Maintained by MDOT
- Length: 2.545 mi (4.096 km)
- Existed: 1945–present

Major junctions
- South end: M-28 south of Brimley
- North end: Lakeshore Drive in Brimley

Location
- Country: United States
- State: Michigan
- Counties: Chippewa

Highway system
- Michigan State Trunkline Highway System; Interstate; US; State; Byways
← M-219	→ M-222

M-221 is a short state trunkline highway in the Upper Peninsula (UP) of the US state of Michigan that connects M-28 with the community of Brimley and Brimley State Park. The highway was originally part of M-28 until the 1940s when it was briefly a local road. It has been a state highway again since it was designated as M-221 in 1945.

== Route description ==
M-221 runs for 2.494 miles (4.014 km) north from M-28 into the unincorporated community of Brimley in Superior Township. The highway passes through rural fields and woods until it enters downtown. At the corner of Main Street and Lakeshore Drive, the signed portion of M-221 ends, but state maintenance continues on Lakeshore Drive across the Waiska River. The total length of the highway, including the unsigned segment, is 2.545 miles (4.096 km).

M-221 is maintained by the Michigan Department of Transportation (MDOT) like other state highways in Michigan. As a part of these maintenance responsibilities, the department tracks the volume of traffic that uses the roadways under its jurisdiction. These volumes are expressed using a metric called annual average daily traffic, which is a statistical calculation of the average daily number of vehicles on a segment of roadway. MDOT's surveys in 2009 showed that the traffic levels along M-221 were 2,940 vehicles daily north of the junction with 7½ Mile Road and 1,476 vehicles per day south of the intersection; along the whole highway, 26 trucks were recorded in the survey. No sections of M-221 have been listed on the National Highway System, a network of roads important to the country's economy, defense, and mobility.

== History ==
M-221 was part of the original M-25 that ran through the eastern UP in 1919. This specific segment of roadway ran north into Brimley and turned east onto 6 Mile Road to connect with US Highway 2 (now H-63/Mackinac Trail) The trunkline became part of M-28. In early 1942, M-28 was rerouted on the current alignment south of Brimley and this highway was turned back to local control. In 1945, M-221 was designated along a portion of the former M-28.

== Major intersections ==
The entire highway is in Superior Township, Chippewa County.

mi	km	Destinations	Notes
0.000	0.000	M-28 / LSCT – Newberry, Sault Ste. Marie	
2.494	4.014	Lakeshore Drive	Northern end of signed segment; western end of unsigned segment
2.545	4.096	Main Street	Eastern end of unsigned segment
1.000 mi = 1.609 km; 1.000 km = 0.621 mi
