= Drummond Island Airport =

Airport in Michigan, United States

Coordinates: 46°00′34″N 083°44′38″W

- IATA: DRE; ICAO: KDRM; FAA LID: DRM

Summary
- Airport type: Public
- Owner: Drummond Township
- Operator: Drummond Township, Michigan
- Serves: Drummond Island, Michigan
- Elevation AMSL: 668 ft (204 m)
- Website: https://www.drummondislandtownship.org

Map

Runways
Direction	Length		Surface
Direction	ft	m	Surface
8/26	4,000	1,219	Asphalt
1/19	2,500	762	Turf

Statistics (2021)
- Aircraft operations: 5,000
- Based aircraft: 6
- Source: Federal Aviation Administration

Drummond Island Airport (IATA: DRE, ICAO: KDRM, FAA LID: DRM, formerly Y66) is a public airport located one mile (2 km) southwest of the central business district of Drummond Island, in Chippewa County, Michigan, United States. It is owned by Drummond Township. It is included in the Federal Aviation Administration (FAA) National Plan of Integrated Airport Systems for 2017–2021, in which it is categorized as a basic general aviation facility.

Although most U.S. airports use the same three-letter location identifier for the FAA and IATA, Drummond Island Airport is assigned DRM by the FAA and DRE by the IATA (which assigned DRM to Drama, Greece).

The Drummond Township Golf Course crosses runway 8/26.

The airport received $20,000 from the U.S. Department of Transportation as part of the CARES Act to help mitigate the effects of the COVID-19 pandemic.

== Facilities ==
Drummond Island Airport covers an area of 60 acres (24 ha) and contains two runways: 8/26 with a 4,000 x 75 ft (1,219 x 23 m) asphalt surface and 1/19 with a 2,500 x 150 ft (762 x 46 m) turf surface.

For the 12-month period ending December 31, 2021, the airport had 5,000 general aviation aircraft operations, an average of 96 per week. For the same time period, there were 6 aircraft based at this airport, all single-engine airplanes.

The airport has a fixed-base operator that sells fuel.

The airport is staffed Monday through Saturday from 8:00 a.m. until 5 p.m. It is accessible by road from Drummond Road, and is close to M-134.

== International flights ==
US Customs & Border Protection previously processed private aircraft flying internationally to Drummond Island. As of September 30, 2018, CBP planned to withdraw landing rights for international flights due to cost and impacting their operations in the area.

CBP planned to continue to service Chippewa County International Airport in Kinross Township as well as Sanderson Field in Sault Ste Marie, Michigan.

== Accidents and incidents ==
- On June 7, 1999, a Piper PA-28 Cherokee was destroyed on impact with trees and terrain during initial climbout from Drummond Island Airport. A witness reported the aircraft was in a gradually-descending left turn after takeoff, with no unusual engine noises nor smoke. Another reported the aircraft took an unusually-long time to lift off amid gusty winds, while another reported the aircraft's engine runup did not "have the right sound." The probable cause of the accident was found to be an altitude/clearance not obtained/maintained and the inadequate planning/decision by the pilot-in-command.
- On August 25, 2005, a Cessna 414 was damaged after a landing gear collapse while landing at Drummond Island Airport. The pilot and passenger were not injured. The wind at the time of the incident was light, and the touchdown was normal. Shortly after touchdown, the aircraft veered right, and the pilot was unable to stop the veer using rudder, nose wheel steering, or brakes. The cause for the collapse could not be determined.

== See also ==
- List of airports in Michigan
