= King's Casino =

King's Casino may refer to:

- King's Casino Rozvadov, a casino located in Rozvadov, Czech Republic
- Kings Club Casino, a casino located in Brimley, Michigan, United States
