= Kings Club Casino =

Casino in Brimley, Michigan

- Interactive map of Kings Club Casino
- Location: 12140 West Lakeshore Drive Brimley, Michigan 49715; 46.42740°N 84.66479°W
- Opened: July 4, 1984
- Closed: March 16, 2020
- Gaming space: 7,500 square feet (700 m^{2})
- Casino type: Land-based
- Owner: Bay Mills Indian Community
- Website: baymillscasinos.com

Kings Club Casino was a land-based casino in Brimley, Michigan, owned and operated by the Bay Mills Indian Community. Opened on July 4, 1984, it is frequently cited as the first tribally owned casino in the United States.

== History ==
Kings Club Casino opened on July 4, 1984, as the Bay Mills Indian Community’s first gaming enterprise. It is noted for being the first tribally owned facility in the U.S. to offer slot machines and blackjack rather than only bingo.

The casino suspended operations on March 16, 2020, during the onset of the COVID-19 pandemic in the United States. It did not reopen thereafter. In 2025 the Bay Mills Indian Community announced plans to demolish the former casino building and redevelop the site as a retail center, a project budgeted at approximately $5.5 million.

== Features ==
Kings Club Casino featured a 7,500 square feet (700 m^{2}) gaming floor with more than 250 slot machines, blackjack tables, and a small café.

== Legacy ==
Because of its 1984 opening and early adoption of slots and blackjack, Kings Club Casino is often referenced as a milestone in the rise of tribal gaming in Michigan and the United States.

== See also ==
- Bay Mills Resort & Casino
- List of casinos in Michigan
