= Michigan Gaming Control and Revenue Act =

American ballot proposal

Proposal E
- Michigan Gaming Control and Revenue Act

Results
Choice	Votes	%
Yes	1,878,542	51.51%
No	1,768,156	48.49%
Total votes	3,646,698	100.00%
County results
Yes
60–70%
50–60%
No
60–70%
50–60%

The Michigan Gaming Control and Revenue Act, passed by Michigan voters in 1996 as Proposal E and then expanded and signed into law as the Public Act 69 of 1997, allows non-Native American casino gaming in Michigan. The proposal was approved by 51.51% of the voters on November 5, 1996.

The text of the proposal as passed by voters:

An act providing for the licensing and control of casino gambling operations, manufacturers and distributors of gaming devices and gaming employees; providing for the distribution of revenue for public education, public safety and economic development; authorizing limited casino operations within the State of Michigan; and vesting authority for the regulation of casino gaming in a gaming control board.

== Proposal E election results ==
Proposal E
Choice	Votes	%
For	1,878,542	51.51
Against	1,768,156	48.49
Total	3,646,698	100.00
Registered voters/turnout		54.62

== See also ==
- List of casinos in Michigan
- Michigan Gaming Control Board
