= Carletonville (disambiguation) =

Carletonville may refer to:

- Carletonville, Gauteng, a town in South Africa
  - Carletonville (House of Assembly of South Africa constituency)
- Carletonville, Michigan, a former town in Michigan, US
- Carletonville, Ohio, an unincorporated community
