= Bay Mills Township, Michigan =

- Civil township
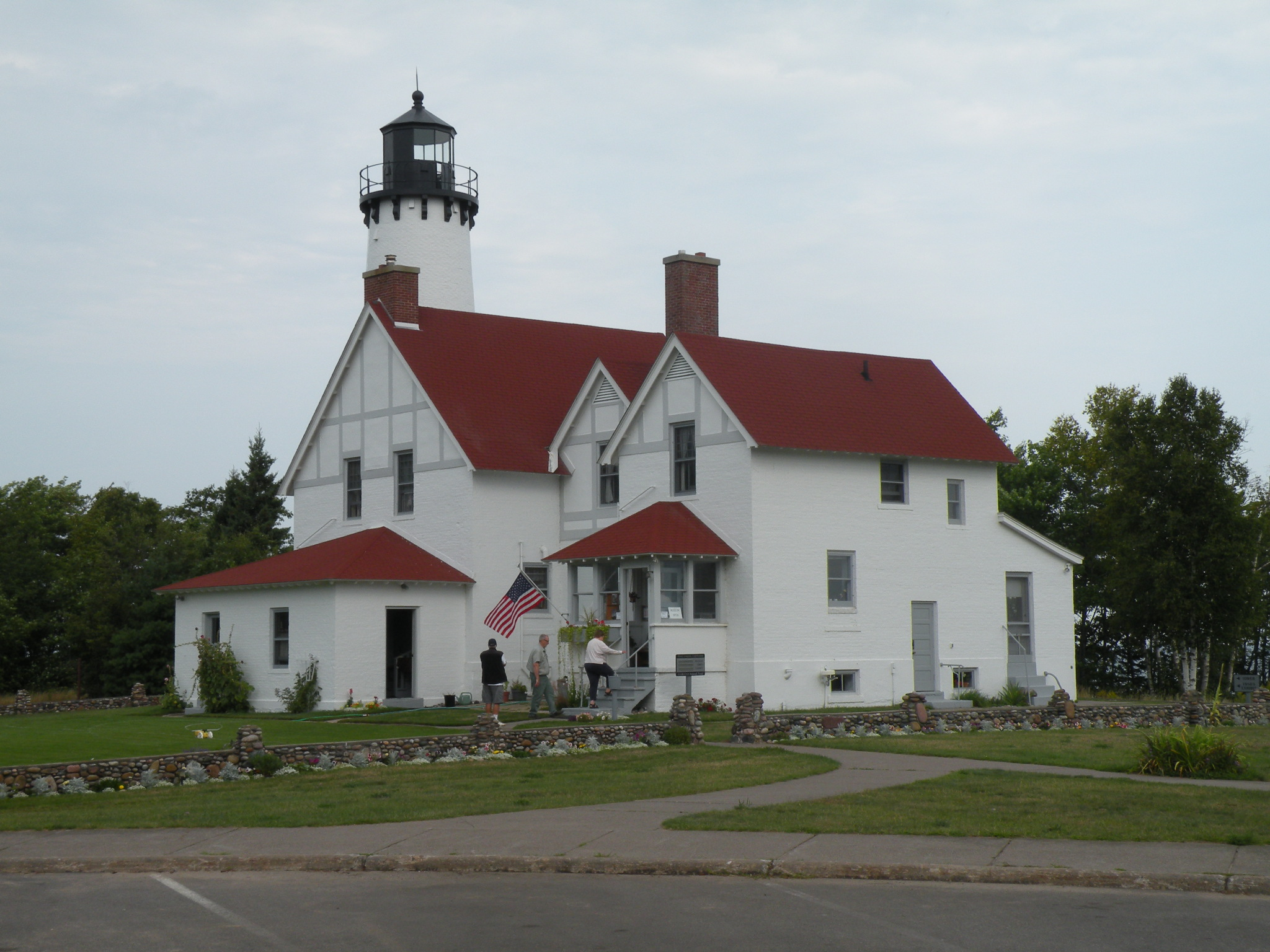
- Point Iroquois Light on the entrance of St. Marys River from Whitefish Bay

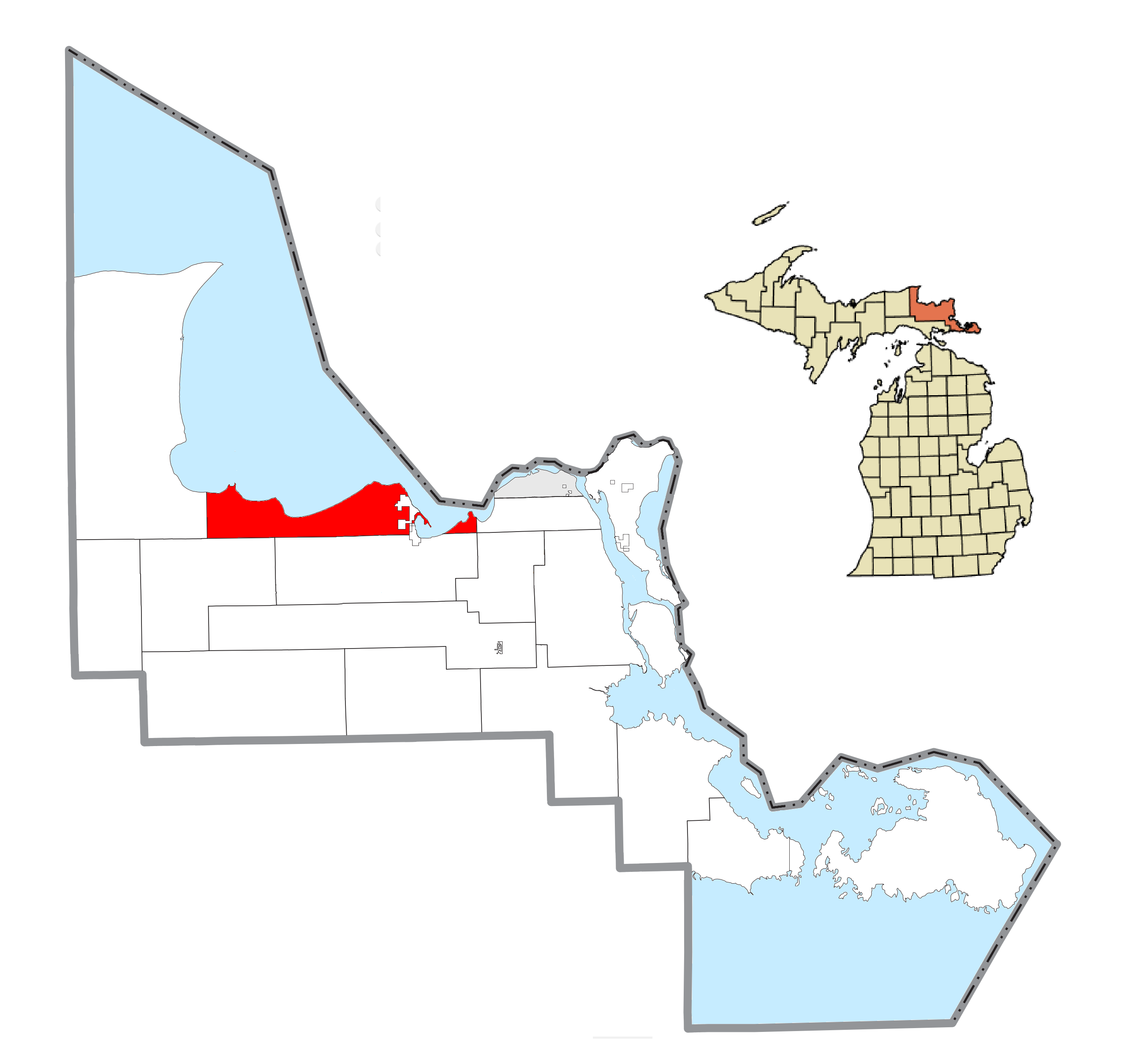
- Location within Chippewa County

- Location within the state of Michigan
- Coordinates: 46°27′17″N 84°41′15″W
- Country: United States
- State: Michigan
- County: Chippewa

Government
  - Supervisor: Roger Graham

Area
  - Total: 98.0 sq mi (253.7 km^{2})
  - Land: 64.7 sq mi (167.6 km^{2})
  - Water: 33.2 sq mi (86.0 km^{2})
- Elevation: 627 ft (191 m)

Population (2020)
  - Total: 1,567
  - Density: 24.22/sq mi (9.350/km^{2})
- Time zone: UTC-5 (Eastern (EST))
  - Summer (DST): UTC-4 (EDT)
- ZIP code(s): 49715 (Brimley); 49728 (Eckerman); 49786 (Kincheloe)
- Area code: 906
- FIPS code: 26-06070
- GNIS feature ID: 1625894
- Website: https://baymillstownship.org/

Bay Mills Township is a civil township of Chippewa County in the U.S. state of Michigan. As of the 2020 census, the township population was 1,567.

== Communities ==
- Bay Mills is an unincorporated community in the township on Bay Mills Point, which separates the Back Bay and Waiska Bay at the head of the St. Marys River from the larger Whitefish Bay on Lake Superior. It is at 46°26′14″N 84°35′02″W and is just south of the Bay Mills Indian Community and is part of a tax-agreement area with the tribe. Postal service is through nearby Brimley with ZIP code 49715. It was established in 1875 as James Norris & Co. lumber mills.
- Mission is an unincorporated community located in the northeast portion of the township near Bay Mills and Bay Mills point.

== Geography ==
Bay Mills Township is in northern Chippewa County on the Upper Peninsula of Michigan and is bordered to the north by Whitefish Bay of Lake Superior and to the northeast by the St. Marys River. By road, the community of Bay Mills is 20 miles (32 km) west of Sault Ste. Marie. All but the eastern end of the township is within Hiawatha National Forest.

According to the United States Census Bureau, the township has a total area of 98.0 square miles (253.7 km^{2}), of which 64.7 square miles (167.6 km^{2}) is land and 33.2 square miles (86.0 km^{2}), or 33.92%, is water.

== Demographics ==
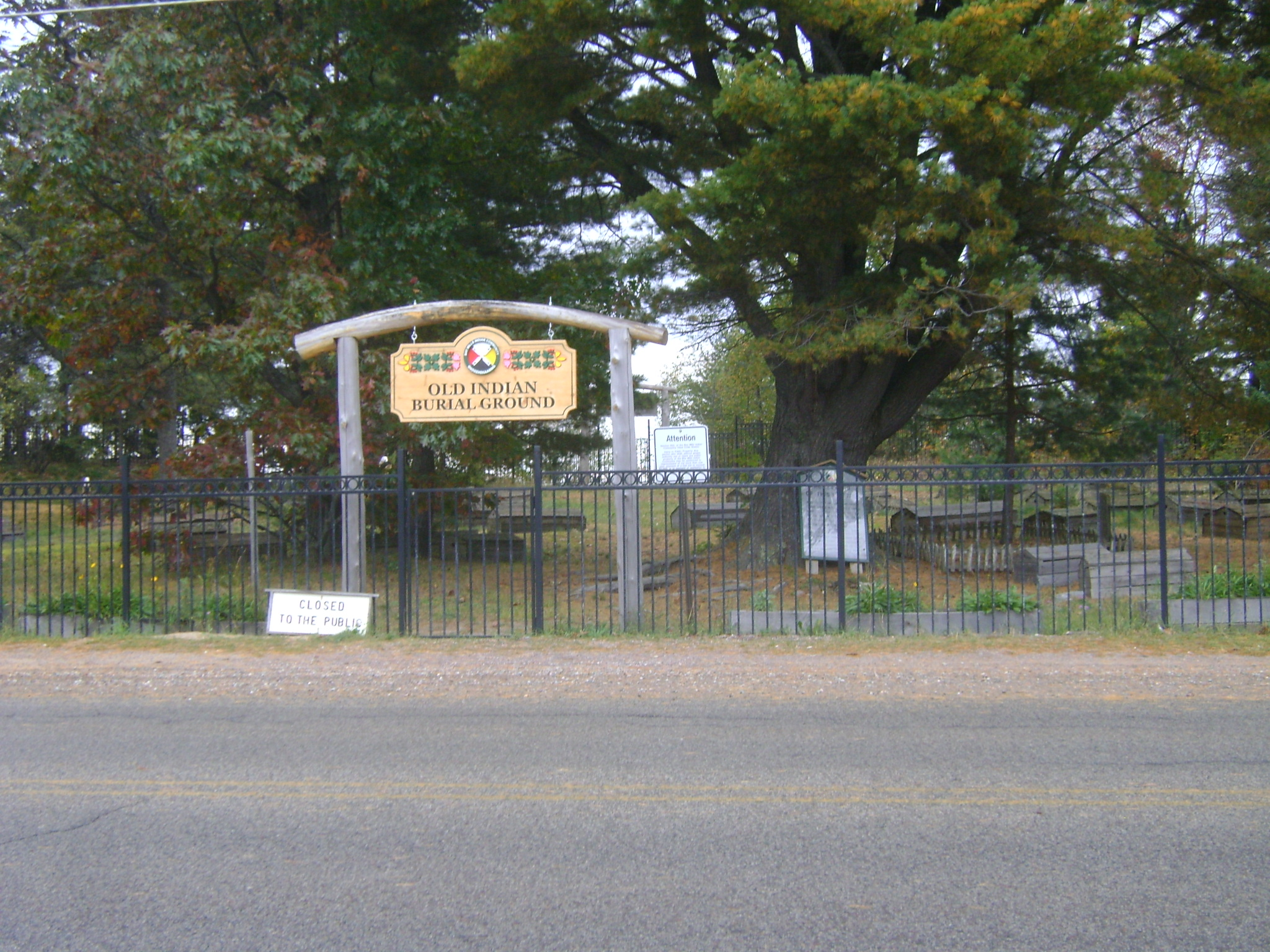
Bay Mills Old Indian Burial Ground

As of the census of 2000, there were 1,214 people, 485 households, and 345 families residing in the township. The population density was 18.8 inhabitants per square mile (7.3/km^{2}). There were 996 housing units at an average density of 15.4 per square mile (5.9/km^{2}). The racial makeup of the township was 44.98% White, 51.40% Native American, 0.08% Asian, 0.25% from other races, and 3.29% from two or more races. Hispanic or Latino of any race were 0.99% of the population. 41.51% was of Ojibwe, 6.7% German, 6.6% French, 6.6% Irish, 6.2% English, 3.0% American, 2.7% French-Canadian, 2.6% Scottish, 2.6% Norwegian, and 2.4% Italian ancestry.

There were 485 households, out of which 36.5% had children under the age of 18 living with them, 51.5% were married couples living together, 14.8% had a female householder with no husband present, and 28.7% were non-families. 23.7% of all households were made up of individuals, and 7.0% had someone living alone who was 65 years of age or older. The average household size was 2.50 and the average family size was 2.92.

In the township, the population was spread out, with 28.3% under the age of 18, 10.0% from 18 to 24, 29.0% from 25 to 44, 19.9% from 45 to 64, and 12.9% who were 65 years of age or older. The median age was 33 years. For every 100 females, there were 98.7 males. For every 100 females age 18 and over, there were 98.9 males.

The median income for a household in the township was $35,875, and the median income for a family was $39,286. Males had a median income of $25,714 versus $21,250 for females. The per capita income for the township was $18,285. About 10.1% of families and 11.8% of the population were below the poverty line, including 18.6% of those under age 18 and 1.4% of those age 65 or over.

== History ==
In 2021, on Easter Sunday the Kateri Tekakwitha church in Bay Mills, Michigan burnt. A picture of the saint survived the fire. That May of the same year, another fire broke out at the same church and destroyed it.
