= Michael J. Malik Sr. =

Michael J. Malik Sr. (born February 1954) is a developer and entrepreneur from Detroit, Michigan who resides in Birmingham, Michigan. Currently his net worth is $750,000,000.

Since the early 1990s he and his partner Marian Ilitch have been catalysts for legalization of gambling and development of gambling halls from coast to coast and in Hawaii with mixed results. Among them: casinos for Michigan's Little River Band of Ottawa Indians in Manistee; and the Bay Mills Indian Community in Brimley and a proposed off-reservation casino in Port Huron; several failed attempts to legalize gambling in the State of Hawaii and develop casinos on Waikīkī Beach; a planned casino resort on Long Island, New York in the Town of Southampton (often referred to as The Hamptons) as Gateway Casino Resorts, LLC partnered with the Shinnecock Indians; and as Barwest, LLC, partners with the Big Lagoon Rancheria Indians and the Los Coyotes Band of Cahuilla and Cupeño Mission Indians to develop proposed dual off-reservation casinos in Barstow, California.

Malik is a hunter paid a $14,995 fine in 2008 for illegally shooting a large bull elk on an auction tag for which he paid $135,000.

== Detroit casino development ==
As a partner with NAG, Malik directed a ballot effort to bring casino gambling to Detroit, Michigan. In 1996, NAG teamed with Atwater Entertainment to support the passage of a Michigan statewide proposal facilitating the development of three commercial casinos in Detroit. Following passage of the proposal, Malik worked with state elected officials to negotiate and implement the regulatory oversight framework for the Detroit casinos.

Malik was a partner in the casino group Detroit Entertainment, which included Marina Ilitch and more than 130 local partners. Detroit Entertainment selected Mandalay Bay Group as casino operator, and Malik worked with them on the development of the casino project now called MotorCity Casino. His efforts have resulted in an entertainment industry in Detroit that today exceeds $1.3 billion per year.

== Native American gaming ==
Malik helped develop a casino for the Little River Band of Ottawa Indians in Manistee in northwest Michigan. He was responsible for site selection and land acquisition, construction firm selection, assistance in obtaining a gaming compact, and establishing casino operations. Today the Little River Casino is the third most profitable Indian owned and operated casino of the 18 located in Michigan.

Malik also assisted in the development of two casinos, a hotel and a golf course for the Bay Mills Indian Tribe in Brimley, Michigan. He assisted the tribe with the legislative approval process for obtaining the first gaming compact in Michigan. Malik is currently working with the Bay Mills Tribe to develop a casino in Port Huron, Michigan.

Malik is managing partner in the casino development group BarWest L.L.C., and is working with the Los Coyotes Band from San Diego County, California to construct and operate a world-class casino complex in Barstow, California.

== Other business interests ==
The owner of MJM Enterprises and Development, Malik is involved in a spectrum of development projects, including hunting and fishing preserves, oil and gas development, financing touring entertainment acts and developing business expansion projects.

Malik has been a real estate developer and licensed broker for more than 25 years. As one of the first 26 Michigan residents licensed in securities and exchange real estate, Malik has developed many commercial projects. He specializes in resort development, industrial parks, retail shopping malls and urban development.
