= Brimley State Park =

Park in Michigan, USA

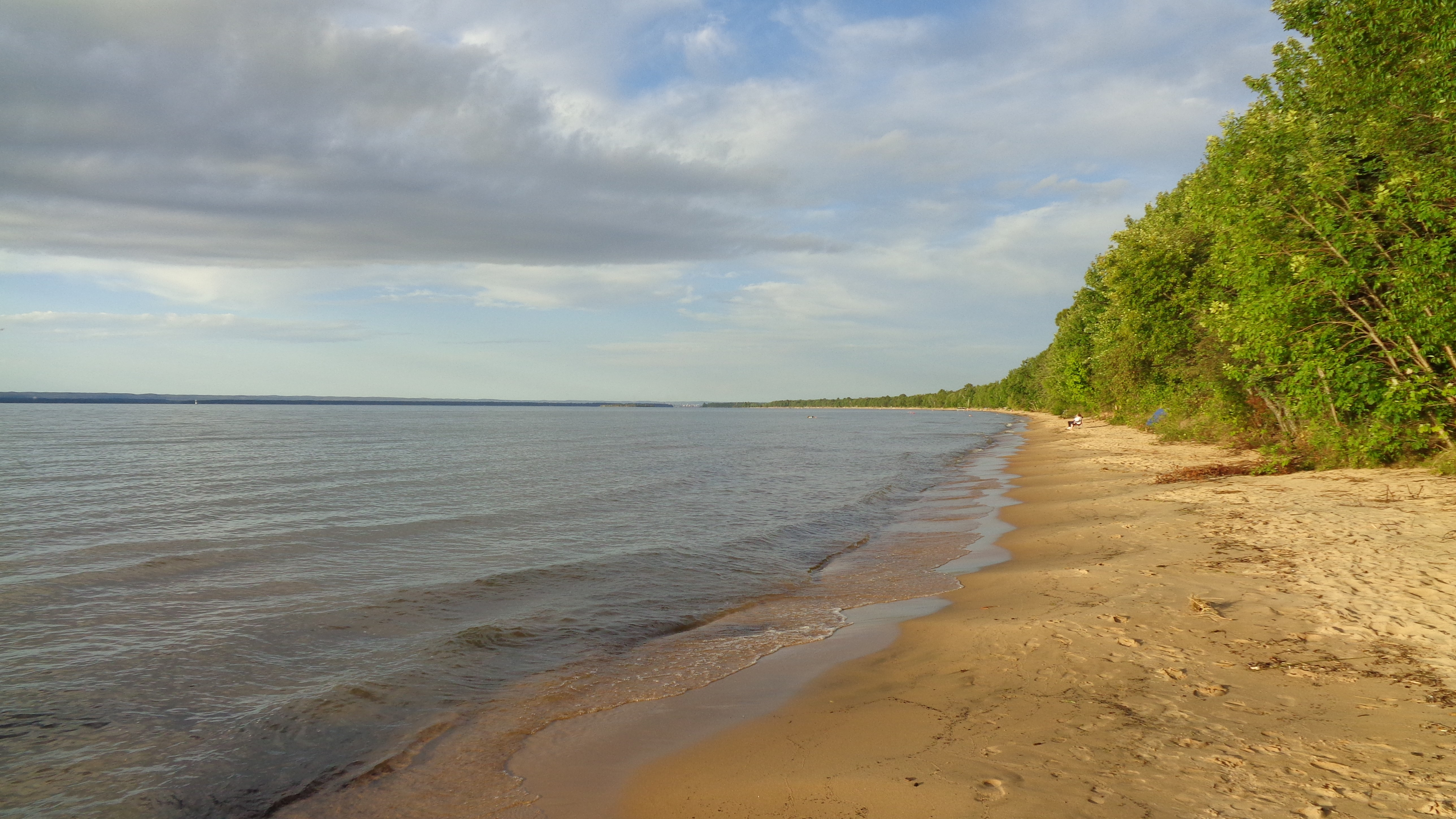
- Lake Superior beachfront

- Location within Michigan Location within the United States
- Interactive map of Brimley State Park
- Location: Superior Township, Chippewa County, Michigan
- Nearest city: Sault Ste. Marie, Michigan
- Coordinates: 46°24′52″N 84°33′25″W
- Area: 100 acres (40 ha)
- Elevation: 623 feet (190 m)
- Established: 1922
- Administrator: Michigan Department of Natural Resources
- Designation: Michigan state park
- Website: Official website

Brimley State Park is a public recreation area covering approximately 100 acres (40 ha) on the shore of Whitefish Bay at the far eastern end of Lake Superior in the U.S. state of Michigan. The state park is located on the northeast side of the Village of Brimley, eleven miles southwest of Sault Ste. Marie. To help create the park, the Village of Brimley gave an initial 38 acres (15 ha) to the Michigan Department of Natural Resources in 1923. The park offers an observation platform as well as facilities for camping, picnicking, swimming, fishing, and boating.
