= Dafter Township, Michigan =

- Civil township
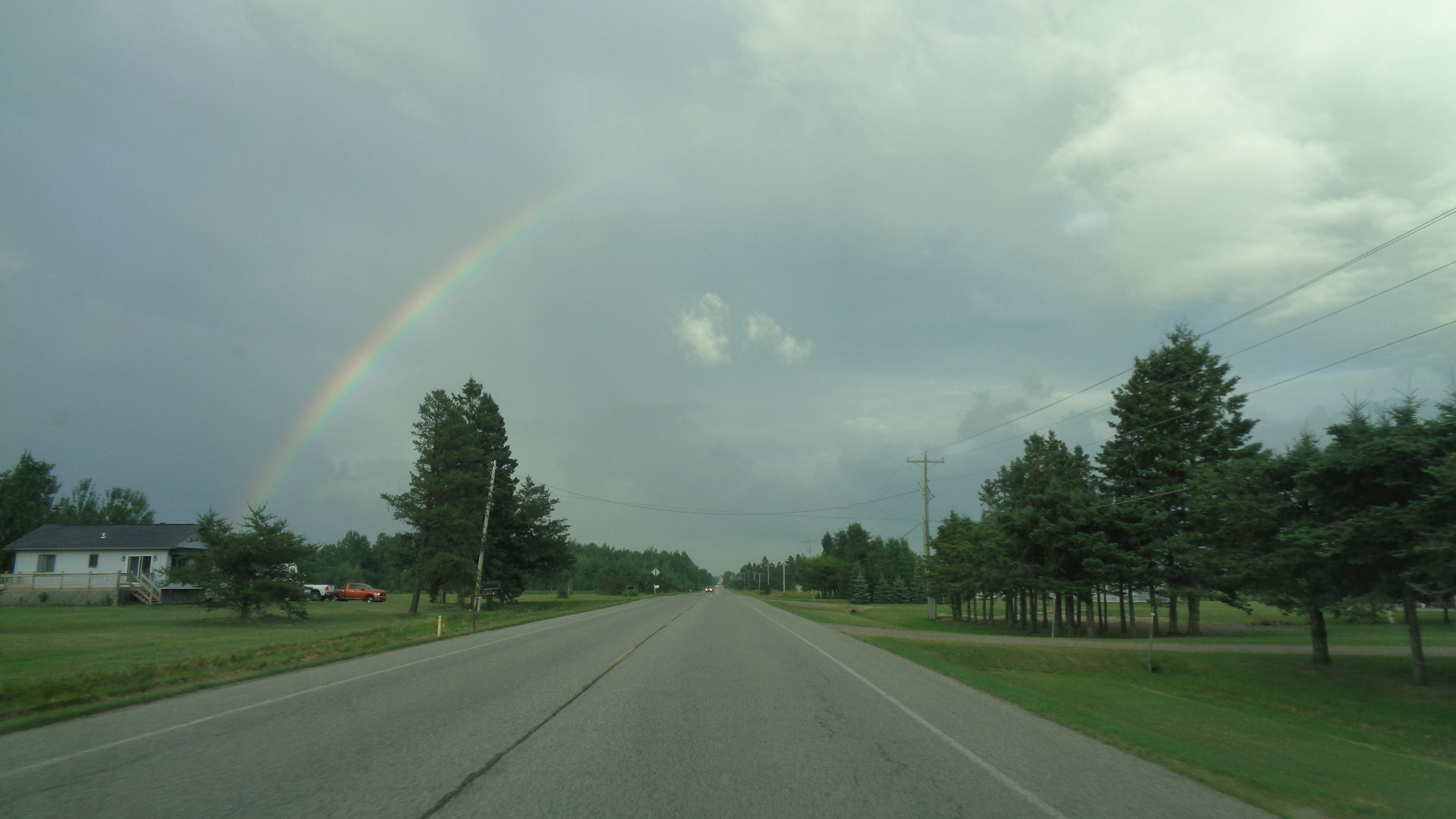
- Dafter Township along West 6 Mile Road

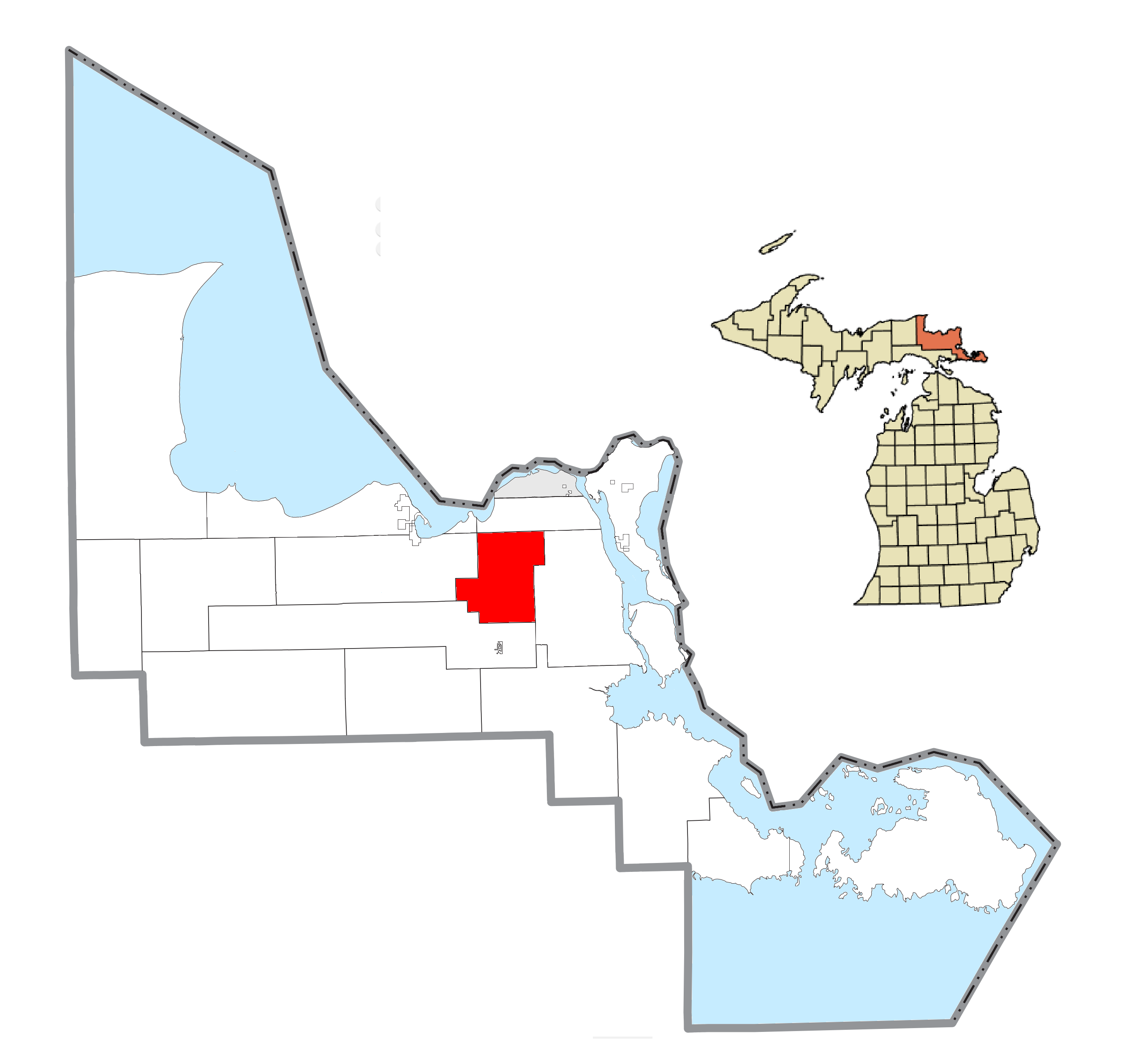
- Location within Chippewa County

- Location within the state of Michigan
- Coordinates: 46°22′3″N 84°26′28″W
- Country: United States
- State: Michigan
- County: Chippewa

Government
  - Supervisor: Robert Brown

Area
  - Total: 47.9 sq mi (124.1 km^{2})
  - Land: 47.8 sq mi (123.8 km^{2})
  - Water: 0.12 sq mi (0.3 km^{2})
- Elevation: 666 ft (203 m)

Population (2020)
  - Total: 1,327
  - Density: 27.76/sq mi (10.72/km^{2})
- Time zone: UTC-5 (Eastern (EST))
  - Summer (DST): UTC-4 (EDT)
- ZIP code(s): 49715 (Brimley); 49724 (Dafter); 49783 (Sault Ste. Marie)
- Area code: 906
- FIPS code: 26-19540
- GNIS feature ID: 1626154
- Website: Official website

Dafter Township is a civil township of Chippewa County in the U.S. state of Michigan. The population was 1,327 at the 2020 census.

== Geography ==
According to the United States Census Bureau, the township has a total area of 47.9 square miles (124.1 km^{2}), of which 47.8 square miles (123.8 km^{2}) is land and 0.12 square miles (0.3 km^{2}), or 0.26%, is water.

== Communities ==
- Dafter is a small unincorporated community located about a mile southwest of the junction of M-28 with I-75 at 46°21′36″N 84°25′38″W within the drainage basin of the Waiska River. Founded as a lumber settlement, it was given a post office named "Stevensburgh" in January 1879, with George Stevens as the first postmaster. The name of the post office was changed to Dafter, after the township, in July 1893. It was a station on the Minneapolis, St. Paul & Sault Ste. Marie Railroad.

== Demographics ==
As of the census of 2000, there were 1,304 people, 488 households, and 367 families residing in the township. The population density was 27.3 inhabitants per square mile (10.5/km^{2}). There were 545 housing units at an average density of 11.4 per square mile (4.4/km^{2}). The racial makeup of the township was 84.20% White, 0.23% African American, 11.04% Native American, 0.31% Asian, 0.08% Pacific Islander, 0.23% from other races, and 3.91% from two or more races. Hispanic or Latino of any race were 1.15% of the population.

There were 488 households, out of which 36.3% had children under the age of 18 living with them, 62.7% were married couples living together, 8.0% had a female householder with no husband present, and 24.6% were non-families. 20.7% of all households were made up of individuals, and 7.0% had someone living alone who was 65 years of age or older. The average household size was 2.67 and the average family size was 3.09.

In the township the population was spread out, with 27.2% under the age of 18, 7.4% from 18 to 24, 30.7% from 25 to 44, 23.2% from 45 to 64, and 11.5% who were 65 years of age or older. The median age was 38 years. For every 100 females, there were 106.0 males. For every 100 females age 18 and over, there were 103.6 males.

The median income for a household in the township was $42,452, and the median income for a family was $48,125. Males had a median income of $35,221 versus $21,830 for females. The per capita income for the township was $17,713. About 5.3% of families and 8.0% of the population were below the poverty line, including 9.0% of those under age 18 and 10.5% of those age 65 or over.
