= Kinross Township Hall and School =

- U.S. National Register of Historic Places
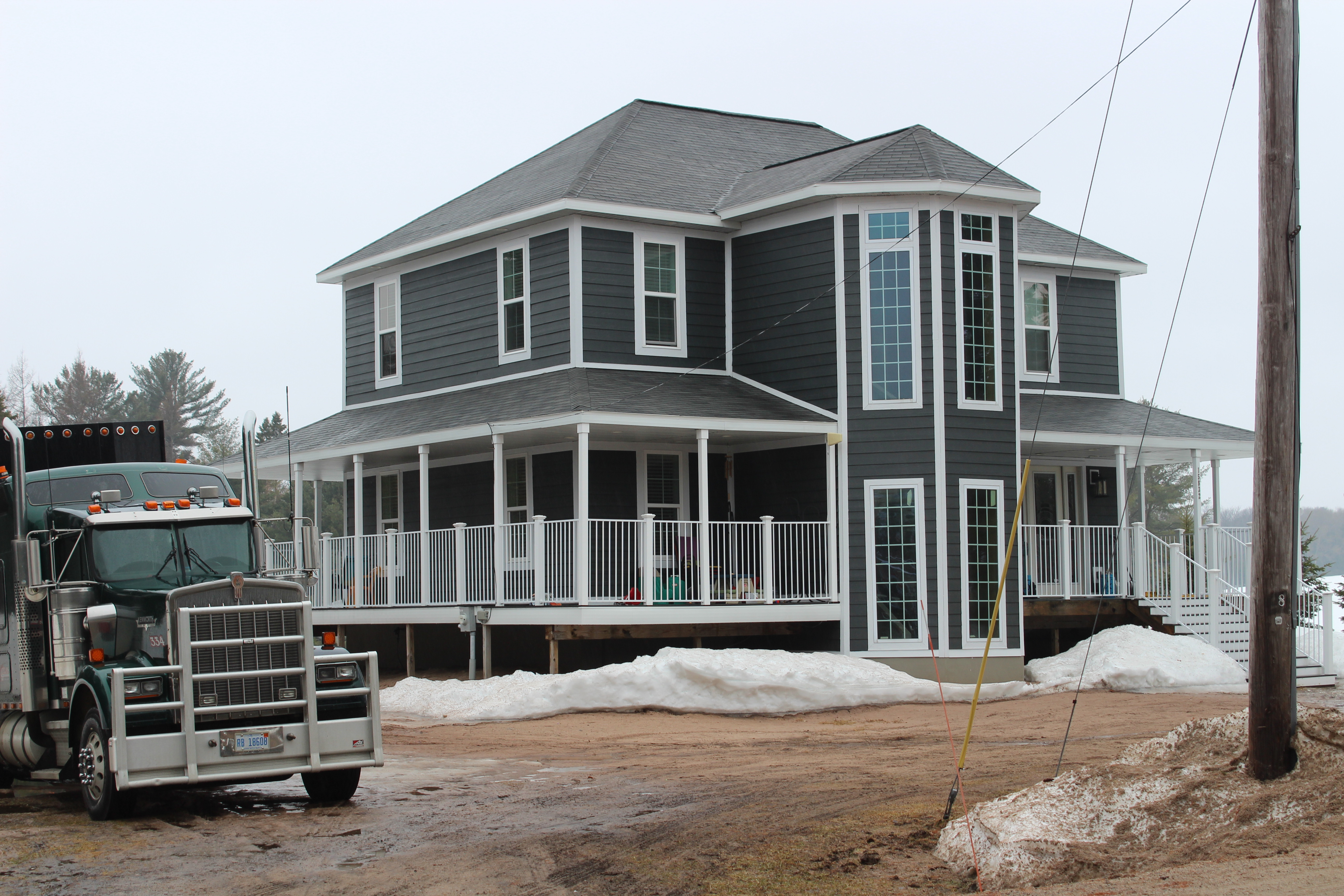
- New building on the site in 2019

- Location within Michigan Location within the United States
- Interactive map
- Location: 7305 W. Kinross Rd., Kinross Township, Michigan
- Coordinates: 46°16′36″N 84°30′56″W
- Area: 1 acre (0.40 ha)
- Built: 1905
- Architectural style: Late Victorian
- NRHP reference No.: 03001549
- Added to NRHP: February 4, 2004

The Kinross Township Hall and School is a government and educational building located at 7305 West Kinross Road in Kinross Township, Michigan. It was listed on the National Register of Historic Places in 2004.

== History ==
In 1887, the Minneapolis, St. Paul and Sault Ste. Marie Railroad laid a railway through this area of Michigan, connecting Minneapolis to Sault Ste. Marie. A handful of settlers established what is now the village of Kinross near this site, and in 1891 the railroad opened a station nearby. In 1899, coalescing around the village, Kinross Township was established from portions of surrounding townships. The school district serving the village (designated Kinross Township's School District No. 2) already had a school building, but in preparation for the construction of a new school, the lot on which this building originally stood was purchased by the district in 1902.

In April 1905, the Kinross Township Board and Board of Education of the Kinross Township School District met jointly and voted to erect a new building to house both a town hall and a school, with the school on the lower floor of the building and the town hall on the upper. Construction began later in 1905, and the building opened in September of that year as a school and meeting house. In the early 1930s, the construction of US 2 was planned through the original site of the school, necessitating a move. After some discussion, a new location was selected, and the building was moved to its present location in 1931.

The school originally had a single teacher, and served grades K-8. Over the next decade, the population of Kinross Township increased, and by 1915 there were seven school districts serving the township. However, economic downturns in the next few decades resulted in a substantial loss of population and a reduction in the number of districts, and by 1943, Kinross was the only public school left in the township. In 1952, the nearby Kincheloe Air Force Base opened a school on its grounds, and by 1959 the base was educating 200 children. A new school site on the base was chosen by the nearby Rudyard Township's school system. Since the base was within Kinross Township, the Kinross Township school system decided to annex itself to the Rudyard Township schools, sending area children to the new school on the base. With the move, the Kinross school closed in 1960.

Kinross Township continued to use the building's second story for township meeting, and in 1965 set up a township office. In 1973, the lower school portion of the building was refurbished and used as a Senior Citizen's Center. In 1978, the township offices were moved to another building, and in early 1979, the Senior Citizen's Center also moved. The last organization to use the building, the Kinross Grange, folded in 1979 and the building was abandoned. In 2000 repairs were made to the roof. The building was sold to private owners in 2010.

== Description ==
The Kinross Township Hall and School is a rectangular two-story hip-roof building on a concrete block foundation, measuring 40 feet across and 26 feet in depth. The building is clad with white-painted clapboard, with plain cornerboards and window trim and projecting eaves with brackets. The front elevation has four symmetrically spaced double-hung one-over-one windows on the second floor, with three identical windows with the same spacing on the first floor. The first floor also has a gabled entry porch at one end of the front facade with a turned-post support at each corner The porch contains paired entry doors, leading to an enclosed, shed-roofed stairwell along the side of the building. A wooden cupola housing a bell was originally located atop the main roof, but has been removed.

The interior originally housed a single classroom on the first floor, with one or more small coatrooms and perhaps bathrooms. The second floor was a single large meeting space. Both stories had wooden floors and narrow tongue-and-groove walls and ceilings. The interior was remodeled in the 1970s, with a kitchen and restrooms installed in the first floor space. In addition, was installed over the original flooring, synthetic wood paneling on the walls, and acoustical tile the ceilings.
