= Bay Mills Resort & Casino =

Casino and hotel in the United States

- Interactive map of Bay Mills Resort & Casino
- Location: 11386 West Lakeshore Drive Brimley, Michigan 49715; 46.42269°N 84.60237°W
- Opened: November 1995
- No. of rooms: 144
- Gaming space: 17,000 square feet (1,600 m^{2})
- Casino type: Land-based
- Owner: Bay Mills Indian Community
- Website: baymillscasinos.com

Bay Mills Resort & Casino is a casino and hotel located in Brimley, Michigan, on the shore of St. Mary's River, which opened in November 1995. It is owned and operated by the Bay Mills Indian Community.

== History ==
Bay Mills Resort & Casino was opened by the Bay Mills Indian Community in November 1995.

== Features ==
Bay Mills Resort & Casino features a 17,000 square feet (1,600 m^{2}) gaming floor that includes approximately 600 slots and over a dozen table games, multiple restaurants, and a hotel with 143 rooms.

== See also ==
- Kings Club Casino
- List of casinos in Michigan
