= Carletonville, Michigan =

Coordinates: 46°21′N 84°46′W

Carletonville is a ghost town in Chippewa County, Michigan. It was founded in 1853 by Guy H. Carleton around a sawmill but never took off and did not last long.
