= Waiska River =

Coordinates: 46°24′50″N 84°34′30″W

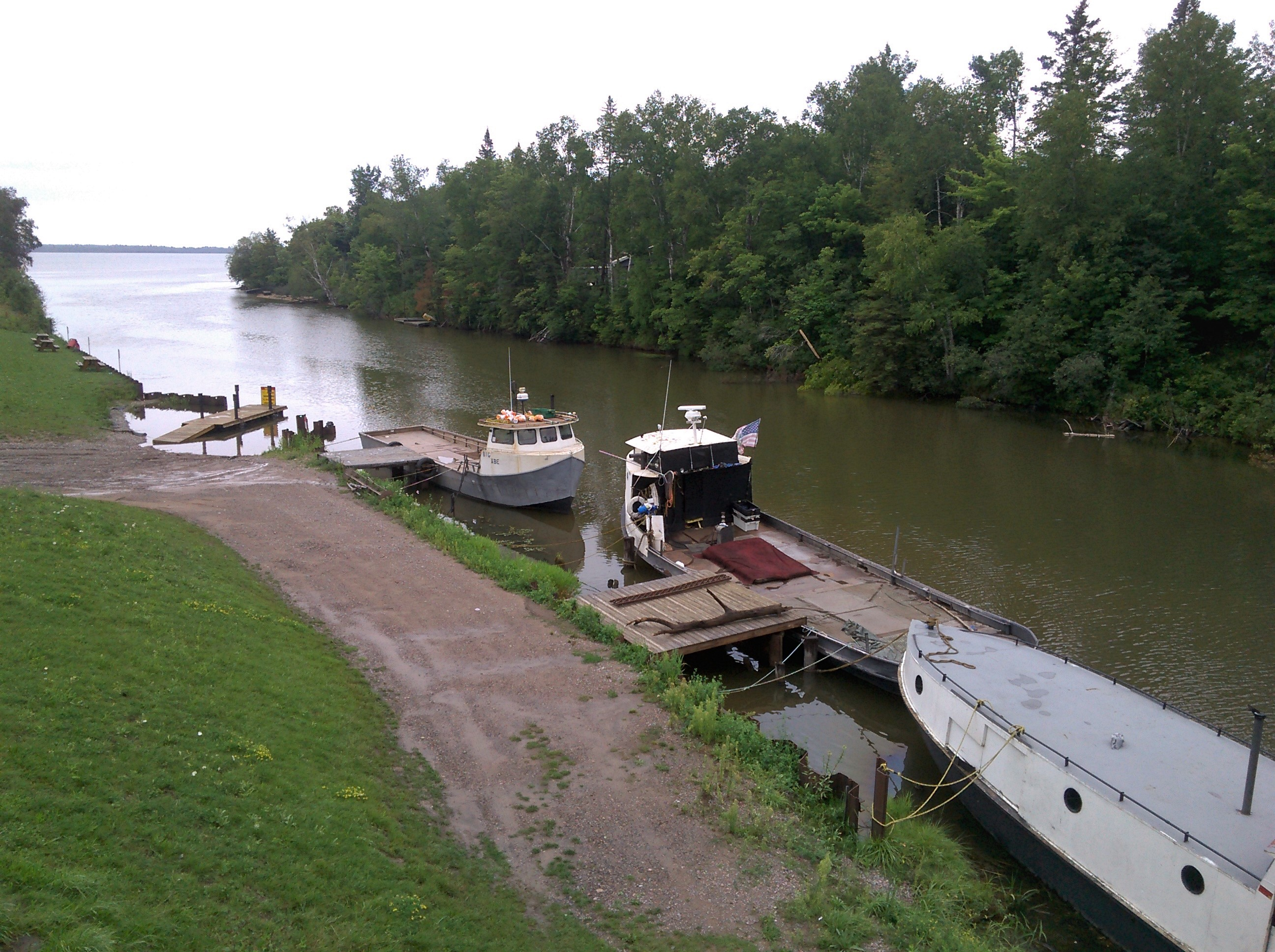

Location
- Country: United States

Physical characteristics
- Source
  - location: Michigan

The Waiska River is a 15.2-mile-long (24.5 km) river on the Upper Peninsula of Michigan in the United States. It flows through Superior Township in Chippewa County, ending at Waiska Bay on the St. Marys River, near the eastern end of Lake Superior. The origin of its name came from the first son of Waubojeeg, an Anishinaabe chief of Chequamegon Bay, in western Lake Superior of what is now Wisconsin. Waishke came to St. Mary's area after his half sister Oshauguscadaywayquay married fur trader John Johnston circa 1793. He became chief of the Anishinaabeg of this area.

== See also ==
- List of rivers of Michigan
