= Michigan Gaming Control Board =

Board overview
- Formed: 1997
- Jurisdiction: State of Michigan
- Headquarters: 3062 West Grand Boulevard, Suite L-700; Detroit, Michigan
- Board executives: Robert L. Anthony, Chair; Richard S. Kalm, Executive director
- Parent department: Michigan Department of Treasury
- Website: michigan.gov/mgcb

Map

The Michigan Gaming Control Board (MGCB) is a gaming control board in Michigan that provides oversight of the state's gaming industry, which was founded and authorized by statewide voting in November 1996.

In 2019 the legislature passed a major expansion to gaming in the state, approving sports betting and online gaming (one online casino allowed for each land-based casino), to be conducted at the three casinos in Detroit and the nearly two dozen casinos owned and operated by federally recognized tribes around the state on their properties.

== History ==
In November 1996, voters in Michigan approved Proposal E, authorizing three commercial casinos in Detroit, the largest city. The Proposal was expanded and signed into law in 1997 as the Michigan Gaming Control and Revenue Act. This created the Michigan Gaming Control Board under the Michigan Department of Treasury.

On October 8, 2009, the Governor of Michigan, Jennifer Granholm, signed Executive Order 2009–45, abolishing the Racing Commissioner and transferring its duties to the Michigan Gaming Control Board executive director, effective January 17, 2010.

On April 11, 2012, Governor Rick Snyder signed Executive Order 2012–4, expanding regulation, under the Board's executive director, of charitable casino-style gaming in Michigan.

On December 20, 2019, Governor Gretchen Whitmer signed a bill to authorize sports betting and online gaming at the three casinos in Detroit and the two dozen tribal casinos located elsewhere across the state. It was passed with strong bipartisan support in the legislature. It also created new regulations for fantasy sports games and related betting in the state. The change is expected to generate "tens of millions" of dollars in new tax revenue for the state.

On November 12, 2020, the Gaming Board has approved license renewals for Greektown Casino, MotorCity Casino, and MGM Grand Detroit.

== Composition ==
The Board is composed of five members and an executive director appointed by the Governor of Michigan and confirmed by the Michigan Senate.

== Activities ==
The agency's four divisions license and regulate the state's commercial casinos, horse racing, some charitable gaming, and related suppliers and employees; and audit the Native American casinos' Class III revenue. Other forms of charitable gaming, such as bingo and raffles, are regulated by the Michigan Lottery.

Due to the sovereignty of Native American tribes, the Board does not have regulatory authority over casinos of federally recognized tribes, but does have oversight authority over the tribes' compliance with the State-Tribal Compact provision. Other aspects of the regulation of Native American casinos in Michigan are handled by the National Indian Gaming Commission and the casino's governing tribe.

Their work is supported by the Michigan Attorney General's Office, the Michigan State Police, and the Michigan Department of Technology, Management and Budget.
