= Chippewa County International Airport =

Airport in Michigan, United States

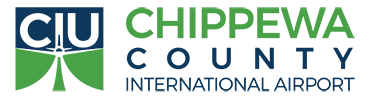
- IATA: CIU; ICAO: KCIU; FAA LID: CIU

Summary
- Airport type: Public
- Owner: Chippewa County EDC
- Serves: Sault Ste. Marie, Michigan
- Elevation AMSL: 799 ft (244 m)
- Coordinates: 46°15′03″N 084°28′21″W
- Website: www.AirCIU.com

Map
- Location of airport in Michigan CIU (the United States)

Runways
Direction	Length		Surface
Direction	ft	m	Surface
16/34	7,203	2,195	Concrete
10/28	5,001	1,524	Asphalt

Statistics (12 months ending August 2026 ^{except where noted})
- Passenger volume: 56,770
- Departing passengers: 28,450
- Scheduled flights: 1,027
- Cargo (lb.): 491k
- Aircraft operations (2019): 3,457
- Based aircraft (2020): 14
- Source: FAA, Michigan DOT

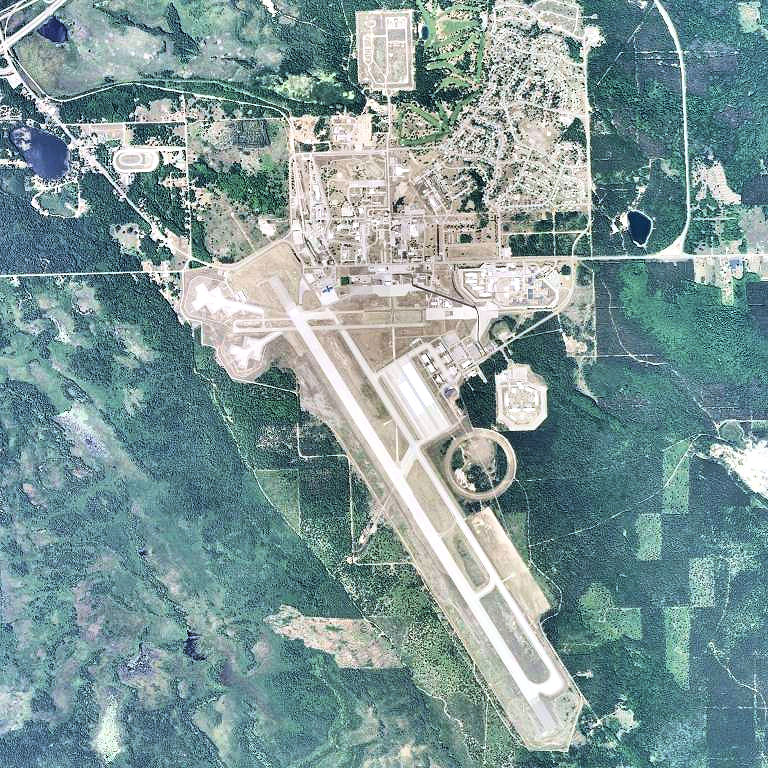
Chippewa County International Airport-2006-USGS

Chippewa County International Airport (IATA: CIU, ICAO: KCIU, FAA LID: CIU) is a public use airport in Chippewa County, Michigan, United States. It is located 15 nautical miles (17 mi; 28 km) south of the central business district of Sault Ste. Marie, Michigan. The airport is owned by the Chippewa County Economic Development Corporation. It was formerly the site of the Kincheloe Air Force Base, which closed in 1977.

It is included in the Federal Aviation Administration (FAA) National Plan of Integrated Airport Systems for 2017–2021, in which it is categorized as a non-hub primary commercial service facility.

The airport received $1.1 million in 2020 as part of the CARES Act to combat the COVID-19 pandemic. The money went towards helping maintain operations and complete upgrades during the pandemic-induced travel downturn.

== Facilities and aircraft ==
Chippewa County International Airport covers an area of 1,850 acres (749 ha) at an elevation of 799 feet (244 m) above mean sea level. It has two runways: the primary runway 16/34 measures 7,203 by 150 feet (2,195 by 46 m) with a concrete surface and the crosswind runway 10/28 is 5,001 by 75 feet (1,524 by 23 m) with an asphalt surface.

The airport opened a new passenger terminal in September 2002. The airport is used mostly for general aviation but is served by one commercial airline. UNICOM is utilized as a common traffic advisory frequency (CTAF) on 123.00 MHz, since the original USAF air traffic control tower is unmanned and non-operational. Runway 16/34 has a displaced threshold and was originally 12,000 feet (3,658 m) in length in order to accommodate B-52 and KC-135 aircraft when the airport was an operational Strategic Air Command base. However, 4,800 feet (1,463 m) of the runway has not been maintained and is no longer suitable for takeoffs or landings.

The airport has an FBO offering AvGas and JetA fuel. Catering, a courtesy car, a conference room, a crew lounge, and other amenities are all available. The facility was upgraded from 2020 to 2022, when it was reopened to the public. $5.5 million were contributed from a federal grant.

For the 12-month period ending August 31, 2019, the airport had 3,457 aircraft operations, with an average of 9 per day: 41% scheduled commercial, 34% air taxi, 23% general aviation and 2% military. In September 2020, there were 14 aircraft based at this airport: 8 single-engine, 5 multi-engine and 1 jet.

== Airlines and destinations ==
=== Passenger ===
Airlines	Destinations
Delta Connection	Minneapolis/St. Paul
United Express	Seasonal: Chicago–O'Hare

Destinations map
Destinations from Chippewa County International Airport
Red = Year-round destination
Green = Seasonal destination
Blue = Future destination

== Statistics ==
Carrier shares (September 2025 – August 2026)
Carrier	Passengers (arriving and departing)
Skywest	56,770(100.00%)

Top domestic destinations (September 2025 – August 2026)
Rank	Airport	Passengers	Airline
1	Minneapolis/St. Paul, Minnesota	12,650	Delta
2	Detroit, Michigan	12,200	Delta
3	Chicago–O'Hare, Illinois	3,600	United

== See also ==
- List of airports in Michigan
