= Bay Mills Indian Community =

Bay Mills Indian Community Gnoozhekaaning (Ojibwe)
- Indian reservation
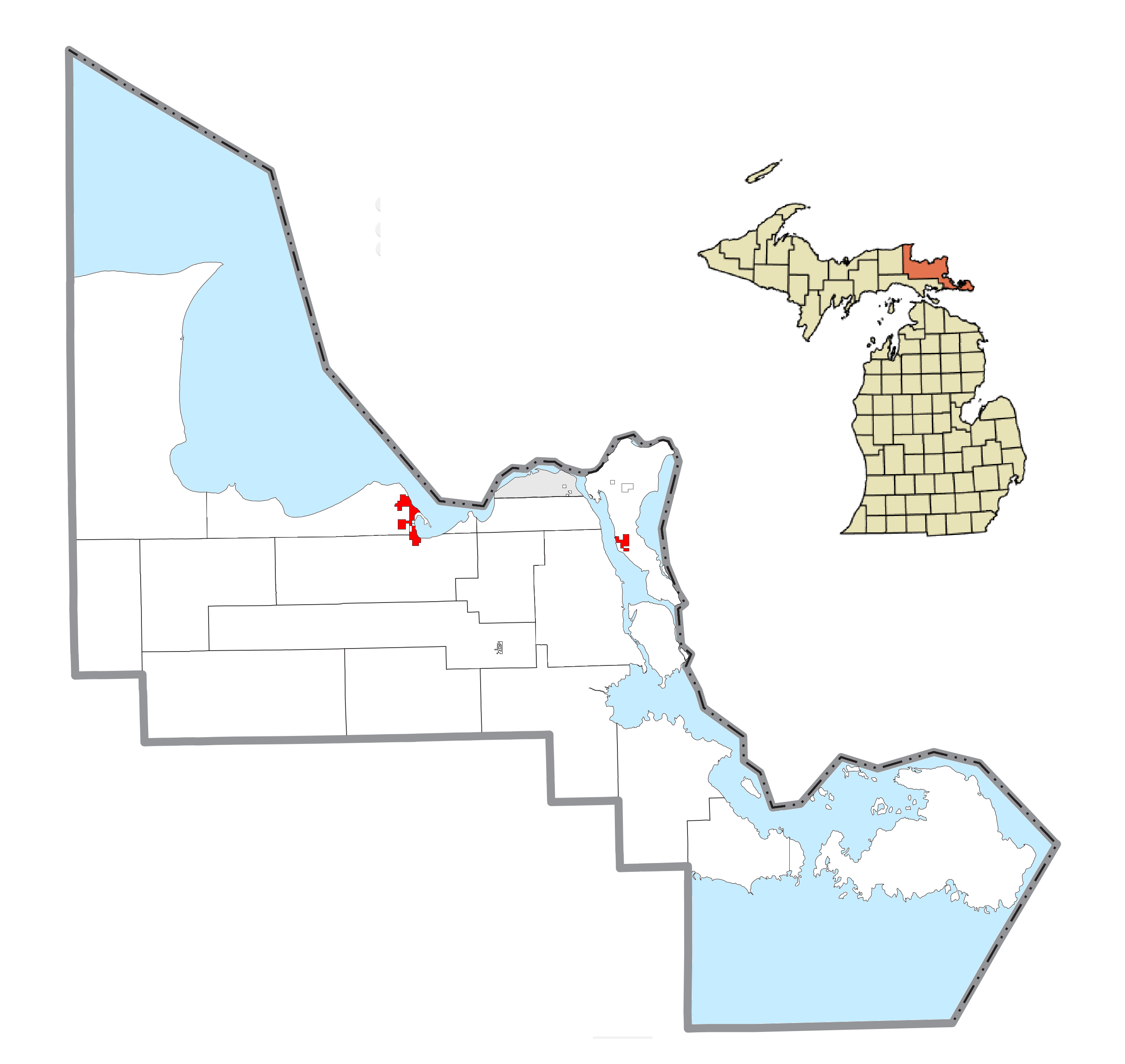
- Locations within Chippewa County

- Location within the State of Michigan
- Coordinates: 46°27′15″N 84°36′49″W
- Country: United States
- State: Michigan
- County: Chippewa
- Land purchased: 1936

Government
  - Type: Executive Council
  - Chairwoman: Whitney Gravelle

Area
  - Land: 4.793 sq mi (12.41 km^{2})

Population (2017)
  - Total: 2,057
  - Density: 429.2/sq mi (165.7/km^{2})
- Time zone: UTC-5 (EST)
  - Summer (DST): UTC-4 (EDT)
- ZIP code(s): 49715 (Brimley); 49783 (Sault Ste. Marie)
- Area code: 906
- Website: Official website

The Bay Mills Indian Community (BMIC. Ojibwe: Gnoozhekaaning, lit. 'Place of the Pike'), is an Indian reservation forming the land base of one of the many federally recognized Sault Ste. Marie bands of Ojibwe.

The largest section of the reservation is located in Chippewa County, Michigan, approximately 15 miles (25 km) west-southwest of Sault Ste. Marie. The tribe has land in both Bay Mills and Superior townships. A smaller section lies southeast of Sault Ste. Marie and encompasses Sugar Island, all contained within the boundaries of Sugar Island Township.

== History ==
The Ojibwe are a large tribe with numerous bands who have occupied territory for centuries around the Great Lakes, particularly Lake Superior and Lake Michigan. Their territories are now divided between the nations of Canada and the United States.

Numerous bands have historically occupied areas around the cities of Sault Ste. Marie, Michigan and Ontario. The city developed along both sides of the St. Mary's River, established first during the colonial era as a French and then British fur trading post. A settled community gradually developed around the post, cosmopolitan in its varied cultures of Native American tribes, Métis people, and French and Anglo ethnic Europeans. In the 19th century, the Ojibwe bands in Michigan were forced to cede large amounts of territory to the United States, and many bands became landless. Nonetheless, they persisted in maintaining their cultural communities.

Bay Mills people are Ojibwe who have lived for hundreds of years around the Whitefish Bay, the falls of the St. Marys River, and the bluffs overlooking Tahquamenon Bay, all on Lake Superior and southwest of Sault Ste. Marie. The Bay Mills Indian Community was officially established by an Act of Congress on June 19, 1860.

After passage of the federal Indian Reorganization Act (IRA) of 1934, during the administration of President Franklin D. Roosevelt, the Bay Mills Indian Community (BMIC) created a new form of government under a written constitution, adopted on November 4, 1936. This was approved and recognized by the federal government, which purchased land for the community to establish a reservation land base. Its territory was one of the four reservations established in Michigan under the 1934 act. These lands, along with the original Bay Mills Mission and a small area on Sugar Island, occupied by its people at least since the late 18th century, comprise the majority of the current reservation land holdings in Chippewa County.

In 1966, BMIC was one of the four founding members of the Inter-Tribal Council of Michigan, established to share developments and to improve relations of tribes with the state and federal governments. Other founding members were the Keweenaw Potawatomie Indian Community, Hannahville Indian Community, and the Saginaw Chippewa Indian Tribe. The council now represents 11 of the 12 federally recognized tribes in Michigan.

In May 2021, the Kateri Tekakwitha church in Bay Mills, Michigan, was destroyed by a fire. It was the second time that the same church had been burned, which had been built in her honor.

== Reservation ==
The area within the reservation boundaries is in U.S. trust status and is divided into two separate areas. As of the 2000 census, the majority of the land base, 3.761 square miles (9.74 km^{2}), lies northwest of Brimley, Michigan, in the eastern parts of Bay Mills and Superior townships. The remaining 1.032 square miles (2.674 km^{2} or 660.67 acres) is located on Sugar Island in the St. Marys River southeast of Sault Ste. Marie and within US boundaries. The tribe's total land area at the time of organization in 1937 was 4.793 square miles (12.41 km^{2}), on which a population of 812 persons resided.

Since the late 20th century, the Tribe has acquired additional land, and now has a land base of approximately 3,494 acres (5.46 sq mi; 14.14 km^{2}), of which 3,109 acres (4.86 sq mi; 12.58 km^{2}) are held in trust by the federal government.

== Government ==
The BMIC consists of approximately 1,309 enrolled members. It is governed by the General Tribal Council, which consists of all voting-age members of the tribe. Daily decisions are made by the Executive Council, which consists of five elected officials (president, vice-president, treasurer, secretary, and councilperson).

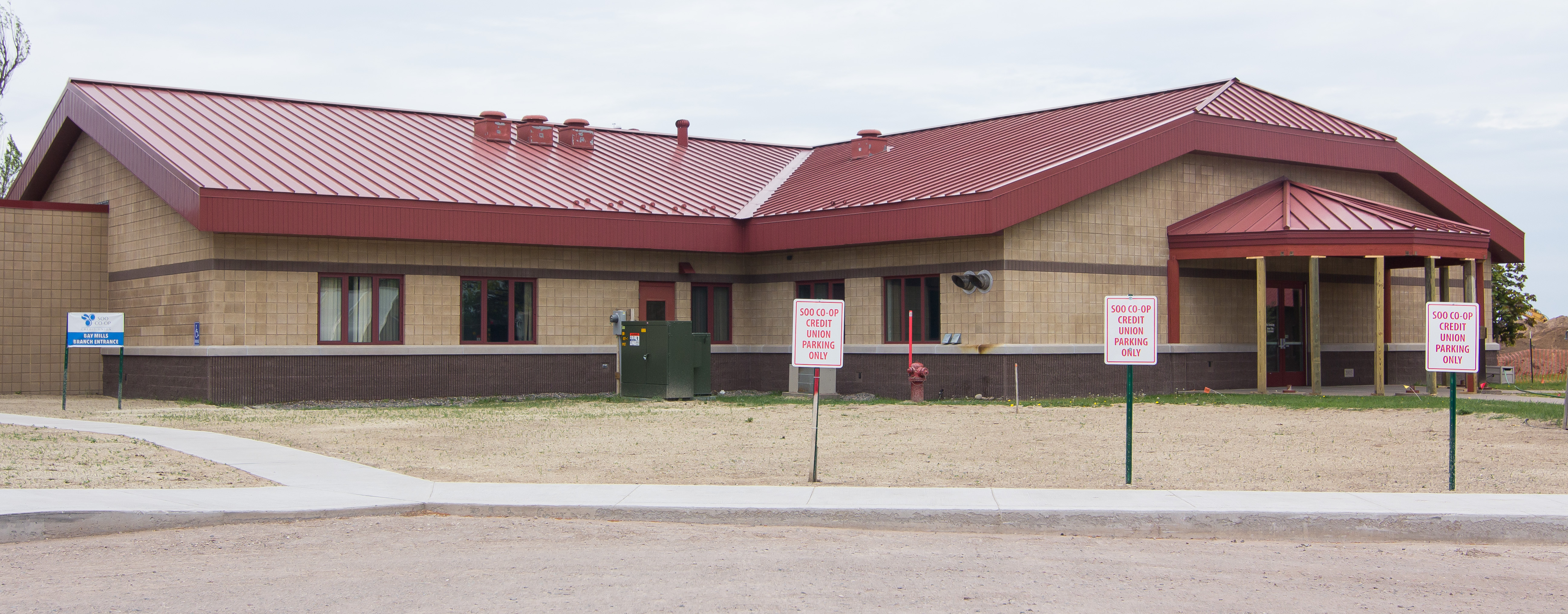
Bay Mills Community College is an accredited tribal college operated in by the BMIC

The tribe operates Bay Mills Community College, an accredited tribal college, and Bay Mills Resort & Casino.

== Environment ==
=== Biological Services Department ===
The Biological Services Department strives to enhance, protect, and restore fish, wildlife, and plant communities, and bodies of water. Staff participate in research and monitoring of the environment on both tribal trust lands and the surrounding region. Major programs include Great Lakes fisheries assessments, inland fish and wildlife assessments, forest management, invasive species management, beach health monitoring, water quality assessments, and some recycling programs to reduce hazardous chemicals entering the environment. Biological Services also provides outreach and education to the community in both public events and printed publications.

==== Recycling Initiatives ====
Bay Mills Biological Services Department seeks to prevent hazardous chemicals from entering the environment by supporting recycling and waste collection.

=== Law Support ===
Clean water is essential to the Bay Mills Indian Community. The Clean Water Act authorizes the EPA to provide assistance to tribes to protect and maintain the waters in and around their land. The EPA awarded a grant of $124,400 to the Bay Mills Indian Community of Michigan to implement water resource and non-point source programs to protect human health and the environment. The funding allows the tribe to continue efforts that establish and implement ongoing water pollution control programs. It also supports water quality monitoring, and community education and outreach.

== Economy ==
Following changes in state and national laws to allow gaming casinos on tribal reservations, in the mid-1990s, the tribe started working with casino syndicator Michael J. Malik, Sr. and Detroit businesswoman Marian Ilitch to develop a casino. It wanted to generate jobs and revenue for reinvestment in education and welfare of tribal members. Originally Malik and his partners had proposed that the tribe, in partnership with Harrah's, build a casino in the area of Downtown Detroit referred to as Foxtown. In 1996 Michigan voters narrowly approved a ballot measure permitting three larger commercial casinos in Detroit, which would have provided too much competition.

For almost a decade BMIC and its partners worked to pursue land claims in the Hay Lake/Charlotte Beach area on the eastern shores of Michigan's northern peninsula, believing that it had been denied adequate compensation from the federal government for lands it was forced to cede in the 19th century. BMIC wanted to trade such land in settlement agreements with the government for potentially more lucrative casino sites closer to population centers, such as Port Huron or elsewhere. BMIC representatives testified in hearings in Congress on this proposal in 2004.

The voters of Port Huron approved the proposal for Bay Mills casino in 2001. While the agreements were signed by the Governor of Michigan and approved by the legislature, they stalled in Congress. Representative Candice Miller (MI-10th) has introduced HR. 831 and Michigan Senator Debbie Stabenow had previously introduced S.2986 to support this project.

The tribe later gained approval for a land deal at Brimley, Michigan, on Waiska Bay west of Sault Ste. Marie. Its Bay Mills Resort & Casino has 17,000 sq feet of casino space with 695 slots and 13 table games, 3 restaurants and 144-room hotel.

== Law ==
=== Legalization of Marijuana ===
After Michigan legalized the recreational use and sale of marijuana, the Bay Mills Indian Community voted to approve the legalization as well. They officially adopted the ordinance allowing individuals to cultivate, possess, and use marijuana on April 8, 2019. The Bay Mills Indian Community became the first tribe in the State of Michigan to legalize the recreational use of marijuana on the reservation. And under the tribe's law, tribal members who have previous convictions in the tribal court for marijuana-based offenses can move to have those convictions vacated.

== Works cited ==
- Michigan, Bureau of Employment and Training, and Bay Mills Indian Community, Michigan. Bay Mills Indian Community Comprehensive Plan. The Bureau, 1977. Web.
- Cleland, Charles E. (2001). The Place of the Pike (Gnoozhekaaning): A History of the Bay Mills Indian Community. Ann Arbor: University of Michigan Press. ISBN 0-472-06740-0.
