= Brimley, Michigan =

- Census-designated place (CDP) and unincorporated community
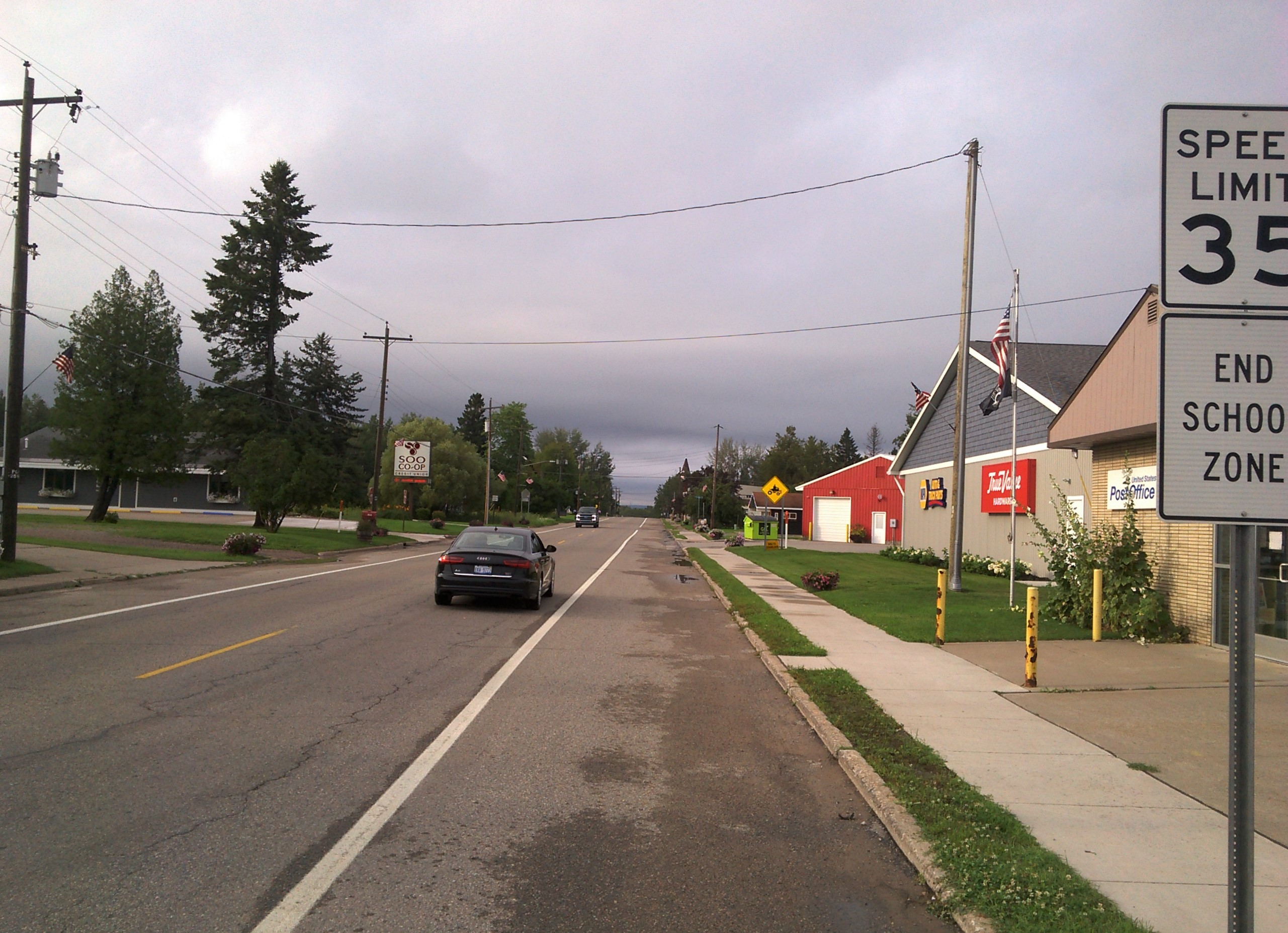
- Downtown Brimley along M-221

- Location within the state of Michigan Location within the United States
- Coordinates: 46°24′27″N 84°34′43″W
- Country: United States
- State: Michigan
- County: Chippewa
- Township: Superior
- Established: 1872
- Platted: 1887

Area
  - Total: 2.15 sq mi (5.6 km^{2})
  - Land: 1.75 sq mi (4.5 km^{2})
  - Water: 0.40 sq mi (1.0 km^{2})
- Elevation: 659 ft (201 m)

Population (2020)
  - Total: 501
  - Density: 288/sq mi (111/km^{2})
- Time zone: UTC-5 (Eastern (EST))
  - Summer (DST): UTC-4 (EDT)
- ZIP code(s): 49715
- Area code: 906
- GNIS feature ID: 2806320

Brimley is an unincorporated community and census-designated place (CDP) in Chippewa County, Michigan. The CDP had a population of 501 at the 2020 census. Brimley is located in Michigan's Upper Peninsula, and is located along the southern shore of Lake Superior. The community is located within Superior Township.

Brimley is home to Brimley State Park and Bay Mills Resort & Casino, the latter operated by the Bay Mills Indian Community. As an unincorporated community, Brimley has no legal autonomy of its own, however it does have its own post office with the 49715 ZIP Code.

== History ==
Brimley was established as a station on the Duluth, South Shore and Atlantic Railway in 1872. The community was platted in 1887, and was given a post office with the name Superior in 1888. The community was renamed to Brimley in 1896.

For the 2020 census, Brimley was included as a newly listed census-designated place.

== Geography ==
According to the U.S. Census Bureau, the Brimley CDP has a total area of 2.15 square miles (5.57 km^{2}), of which 1.75 square miles (4.53 km^{2}) is land and 0.40 square miles (1.04 km^{2}) (18.60%) is water.

Brimley is located in the eastern Upper Peninsula, and is located along the south shore of Waiska Bay, a bay of Lake Superior. The mouth of the Waiska River is located within the community. Immediately west of Brimley is the Bay Mills Indian Community, which is home to Bay Mills Resort & Casino and Bay Mills Community College. Immediately east of Brimley is Brimley State Park.

Brimley lies about 11 miles (18 km) southwest of Sault Ste. Marie.

=== Major highways ===
- M-221 is a short north–south route connecting Brimley to M-28, a major east–west state trunkline highway.

== Demographics ==
Historical population
Census	Pop.	Note	%±
2020	501		—
U.S. Decennial Census

== Education ==
Brimley is home to the Brimley Area Schools district, which operates a public school within the community. The school's teams are known as the "Bays".
