= Chippewa County, Michigan =

County in Michigan, United States

- County
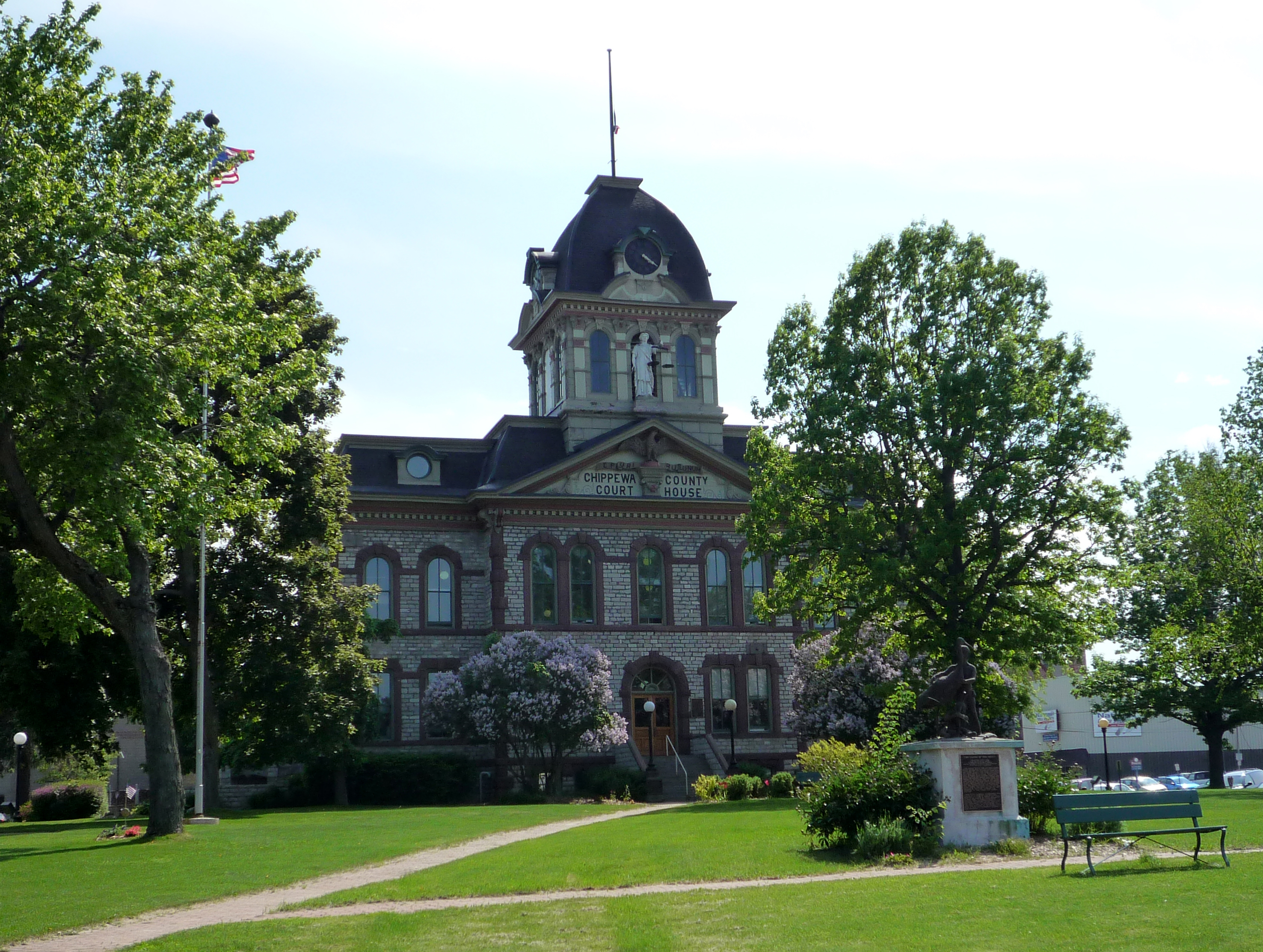
- Chippewa County Courthouse, Sault Ste. Marie

- Flag Seal

- Location within the U.S. state of Michigan
- Coordinates: 46°19′N 84°31′W
- Country: United States
- State: Michigan
- Founded: December 22, 1826
- Named for: Ojibwe people
- Seat: Sault Ste. Marie
- Largest city: Sault Ste. Marie

Area
  - Total: 2,698 sq mi (6,990 km^{2})
  - Land: 1,558 sq mi (4,040 km^{2})
  - Water: 1,140 sq mi (3,000 km^{2}) 42%

Population (2020)
  - Total: 36,785
  - Estimate (2025): 36,081 ▼
  - Density: 23.61/sq mi (9.116/km^{2})
- Time zone: UTC−5 (Eastern)
  - Summer (DST): UTC−4 (EDT)
- Congressional district: 1st
- Website: www.chippewacountymi.gov

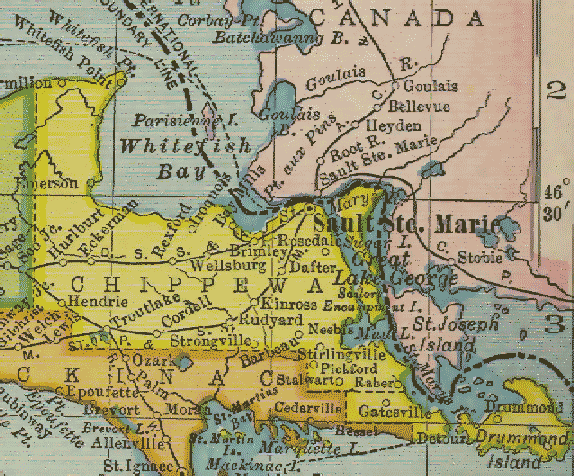
Chippewa County, Michigan from 1904 Michigan County Maps

Chippewa County (/ˈtʃɪpəwɑː/ CHIH-pə-wah) is a county in the eastern Upper Peninsula of the U.S. state of Michigan. As of the 2020 census, the population was 36,785. The county seat is Sault Ste. Marie. The county is named for the Ojibwe (Chippewa) people, and was set off and organized in 1826. Chippewa County comprises the Sault Ste. Marie, MI micropolitan statistical area. With shorelines on Lake Huron and Lake Superior, Chippewa County is one of two U.S. counties to contain shorelines on two Great Lakes, the other being neighboring Mackinac County. The county's irregular shape follows the Canadian border, itself following the St. Marys River. Drummond Island is part of Chippewa County.

== History ==
Chippewa County was much larger when it was created in 1826. Its original bounds included "the Mesaba iron range of Minnesota, the sites of Duluth, Superior, Marquette, Houghton, and all the famous Copper Country." Those regions reorganized when "this tremendous and unwieldy empire of a county was reduced by the Act of March 9, 1843."

== Geography ==
According to the U.S. Census Bureau, the county has a total area of 2,698 square miles (6,990 km^{2}), of which 1,558 square miles (4,040 km^{2}) is land and 1,140 square miles (3,000 km^{2}) (42%) is water. It is the second-largest county in Michigan by land area and fifth-largest by total area.

The Michigan Meridian runs through the eastern portion of the county. South of Nine Mile Road, M-129 (Meridian Road) overlays the meridian. In Sault Ste. Marie, Meridian Street north of 12th Avenue overlays the meridian.

=== Adjacent counties & districts ===
By land

- Mackinac County (south)
- Luce County (west)

By water

- Presque Isle County (south)
- Algoma District, Ontario, Canada (north)
- Manitoulin District, Ontario, Canada (east)

=== National protected areas ===
- Harbor Island National Wildlife Refuge
- Hiawatha National Forest (part)
- Whitefish Point Unit of the Seney National Wildlife Refuge

=== Game areas ===
The Munuscong Bay is open for hunting, boating and bird watching. The area is known for its duck hunting, including mallards, divers and green-winged teal ducks. The Bay is most known for its icefishing and duck hunting. During opening weekend of duck season (late September), hundreds of hunters come from all over the state to begin their season on the Bay. This area has many types of waterfowl pass through it on their annual migrations.

== Communities ==
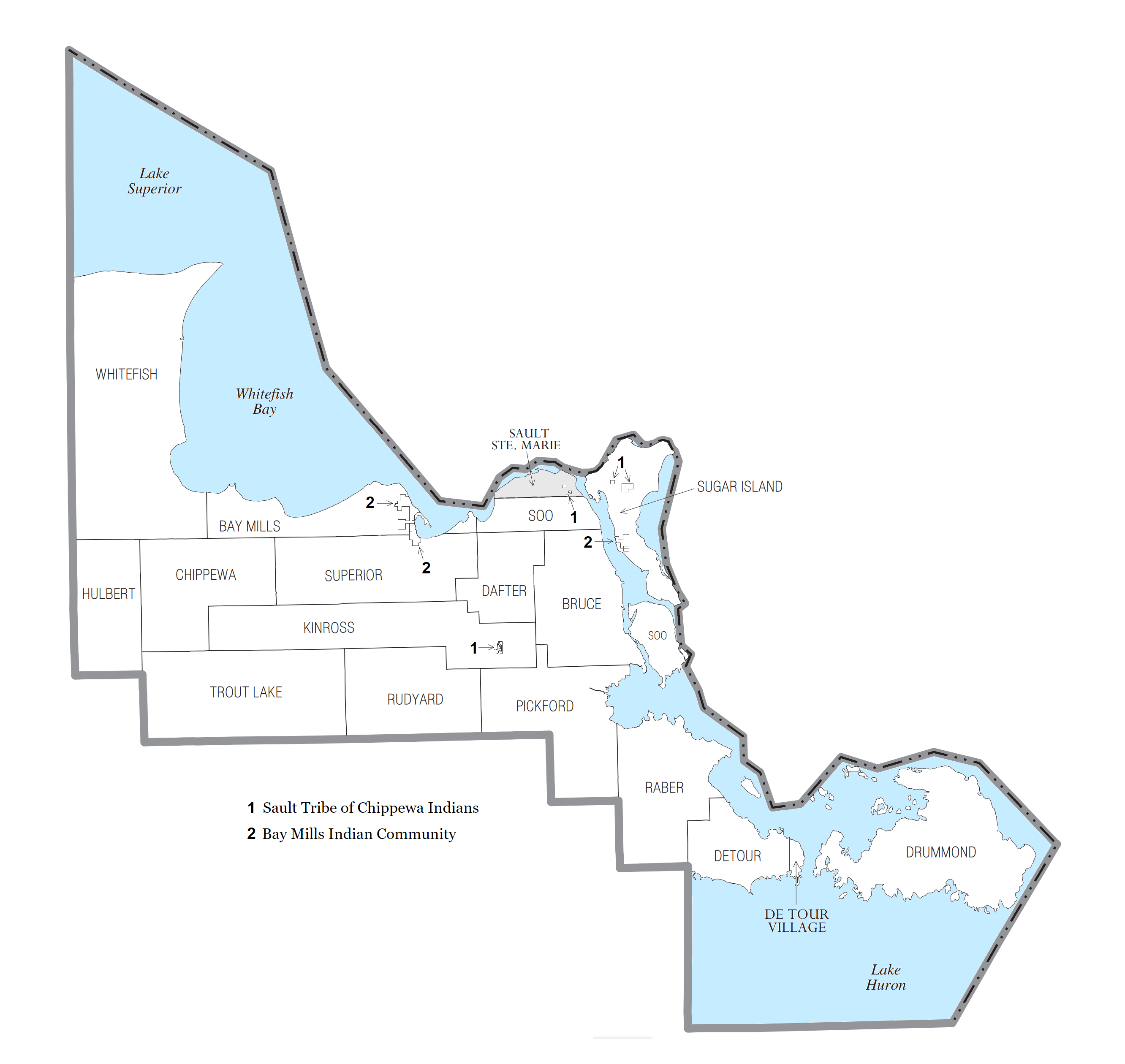
U.S. Census data map showing local municipal boundaries within Chippewa County. Shaded areas represent incorporated cities.

=== City ===
- Sault Ste. Marie (county seat)

=== Village ===
- DeTour Village

=== Charter township ===
- Kinross Charter Township

=== Civil townships ===
- Bay Mills Township
- Bruce Township
- Chippewa Township
- Dafter Township
- Detour Township
- Drummond Township
- Hulbert Township
- Pickford Township
- Raber Township
- Rudyard Township
- Soo Township
- Sugar Island Township
- Superior Township
- Trout Lake Township
- Whitefish Township

=== Census-designated places ===
- Brimley
- Kincheloe

=== Unincorporated communities ===
- Barbeau
- Bay Mills
- Bay Mills Indian Community (Indian Reservation)
- Cartonville (ghost town)
- Dafter (named Stevensburg until 1893)
- Drummond
- Eckerman
- Emerson
- Goetzville (named Gatesville until 1917)
- Homestead
- Johnswood
- Hulbert
- Kelden (also spelled Keldon)
- Kinross
- Mission
- Neebish Island
- Paradise
- Pickford
- Raber
- Raco
- Rudyard (named Pine River until 1890)
- Shelldrake (Ghost town)
- Stalwart
- Stirlingville (named Jolly's Landing until 1888)
- Strongs
- Trout Lake
- Whitefish Point
- Vermilion

=== Indian reservations ===
- The Bay Mills Indian Community occupies a portion of land within Bay Mills Township and Superior Township, within another smaller portion within Sugar Island Township.
- The Sault Tribe of Chippewa Indians occupies scattered pieces of land within Kinross Charter Township, Sugar Island Township, and in the city limits of Sault Ste. Marie.

== Demographics ==
Historical population
Census	Pop.	Note	%±
1830	626		—
1840	534		−14.7%
1850	898		68.2%
1860	1,603		78.5%
1870	1,689		5.4%
1880	5,248		210.7%
1890	12,019		129.0%
1900	21,338		77.5%
1910	24,472		14.7%
1920	24,818		1.4%
1930	25,047		0.9%
1940	27,807		11.0%
1950	29,206		5.0%
1960	32,655		11.8%
1970	32,412		−0.7%
1980	29,029		−10.4%
1990	34,604		19.2%
2000	38,543		11.4%
2010	38,520		−0.1%
2020	36,785		−4.5%
2025 (est.)	36,081	▼	−1.9%
US Decennial Census; 1790–1960 1900–1990; 1990–2000 2010–2018

=== Racial and ethnic composition ===
Chippewa County, Michigan – Racial and ethnic composition Note: the US Census treats Hispanic/Latino as an ethnic category. This table excludes Latinos from the racial categories and assigns them to a separate category. Hispanics/Latinos may be of any race.
Race / Ethnicity (NH = Non-Hispanic)	Pop 1980	Pop 1990	Pop 2000	Pop 2010	Pop 2020	% 1980	% 1990	% 2000	% 2010	% 2020
White alone (NH)	26,056	28,206	28,987	27,542	24,544	89.76%	81.51%	75.21%	71.50%	66.72%
Black or African American alone (NH)	369	2,157	2,088	2,503	2,611	1.27%	6.23%	5.42%	6.50%	7.10%
Native American or Alaska Native alone (NH)	2,395	3,806	5,041	6,007	5,601	8.25%	11.00%	13.08%	15.59%	15.23%
Asian alone (NH)	52	146	174	228	193	0.18%	0.42%	0.45%	0.59%	0.52%
Native Hawaiian or Pacific Islander alone (NH)	x	x	10	21	12	x	x	0.03%	0.05%	0.03%
Other race alone (NH)	66	11	25	10	87	0.23%	0.03%	0.06%	0.03%	0.24%
Mixed race or Multiracial (NH)	x	x	1,619	1,729	2,980	x	x	4.20%	4.49%	8.10%
Hispanic or Latino (any race)	91	278	599	480	757	0.31%	0.80%	1.55%	1.25%	2.06%
Total	29,029	34,604	38,543	38,520	36,785	100.00%	100.00%	100.00%	100.00%	100.00%

=== 2020 census ===
As of the 2020 census, the county had a population of 36,785, the median age was 41.4 years, 18.6% of residents were under the age of 18, and 19.0% of residents were 65 years of age or older. For every 100 females there were 123.2 males, and for every 100 females age 18 and over there were 128.3 males age 18 and over.

The racial makeup of the county was 67.4% White, 7.1% Black or African American, 15.4% American Indian and Alaska Native, 0.5% Asian, <0.1% Native Hawaiian and Pacific Islander, 0.5% from some other race, and 8.9% from two or more races. Hispanic or Latino residents of any race comprised 2.1% of the population.

48.9% of residents lived in urban areas, while 51.1% lived in rural areas.

There were 13,837 households in the county, of which 26.4% had children under the age of 18 living in them. Of all households, 44.7% were married-couple households, 22.0% were households with a male householder and no spouse or partner present, and 24.7% were households with a female householder and no spouse or partner present. About 31.1% of all households were made up of individuals and 13.7% had someone living alone who was 65 years of age or older.

There were 20,268 housing units, of which 31.7% were vacant. Among occupied housing units, 72.5% were owner-occupied and 27.5% were renter-occupied. The homeowner vacancy rate was 2.6% and the rental vacancy rate was 7.9%.

=== 2010 American Community Survey ===
The 2010 American Community Survey 3-year estimate indicated the median income for a household in the county was $39,351 and the median income for a family was $54,625. Males had a median income of $25,760 versus $16,782 for females. The per capita income for the county was $19,334. About 2.3% of families and 18.6% of the population were below the poverty line, including 26.0% of those under the age 18 and 10.0% of those age 65 or over.

== Government ==
Chippewa County voters have been reliably Republican from the start. Since 1876, they have selected the Republican Party nominee in 86% of national elections (31 of 36).

United States presidential election results for Chippewa County, Michigan
Year	Republican		Democratic		Third party(ies)	
Year	No.	%	No.	%	No.	%
1876	172	37.80%	283	62.20%	0	0.00%
1880	396	53.15%	347	46.58%	2	0.27%
1884	686	51.12%	635	47.32%	21	1.56%
1888	1,055	51.56%	909	44.43%	82	4.01%
1892	1,247	52.33%	1,083	45.45%	53	2.22%
1896	2,105	65.52%	1,001	31.15%	107	3.33%
1900	2,477	71.59%	893	25.81%	90	2.60%
1904	2,920	77.78%	662	17.63%	172	4.58%
1908	2,418	64.19%	1,175	31.19%	174	4.62%
1912	889	23.31%	879	23.05%	2,046	53.64%
1916	2,365	54.64%	1,768	40.85%	195	4.51%
1920	4,732	74.36%	1,266	19.89%	366	5.75%
1924	5,443	77.44%	516	7.34%	1,070	15.22%
1928	5,326	68.68%	2,355	30.37%	74	0.95%
1932	5,252	54.34%	4,221	43.67%	192	1.99%
1936	4,901	47.13%	5,259	50.58%	238	2.29%
1940	5,851	51.54%	5,473	48.21%	29	0.26%
1944	5,335	54.86%	4,344	44.67%	46	0.47%
1948	4,977	53.34%	3,860	41.37%	494	5.29%
1952	7,075	62.12%	4,257	37.38%	57	0.50%
1956	6,957	62.81%	4,106	37.07%	14	0.13%
1960	6,490	55.23%	5,239	44.58%	22	0.19%
1964	4,098	38.45%	6,537	61.33%	23	0.22%
1968	5,359	52.04%	4,132	40.13%	806	7.83%
1972	7,028	59.03%	4,744	39.85%	134	1.13%
1976	7,025	53.32%	6,022	45.71%	128	0.97%
1980	7,059	52.31%	5,268	39.04%	1,167	8.65%
1984	8,135	63.77%	4,575	35.86%	47	0.37%
1988	6,786	56.23%	5,222	43.27%	60	0.50%
1992	5,462	40.02%	5,434	39.82%	2,751	20.16%
1996	5,137	38.74%	6,532	49.26%	1,590	11.99%
2000	7,526	52.43%	6,370	44.38%	458	3.19%
2004	9,122	55.33%	7,203	43.69%	163	0.99%
2008	8,267	49.48%	8,184	48.98%	257	1.54%
2012	8,278	52.86%	7,100	45.34%	282	1.80%
2016	9,122	58.65%	5,379	34.59%	1,051	6.76%
2020	10,681	60.44%	6,648	37.62%	342	1.94%
2024	11,249	61.25%	6,796	37.01%	320	1.74%

United States Senate election results for Chippewa County, Michigan1
Year	Republican		Democratic		Third party(ies)	
Year	No.	%	No.	%	No.	%
2024	10,751	59.68%	6,689	37.13%	573	3.18%

Michigan Gubernatorial election results for Chippewa County
Year	Republican		Democratic		Third party(ies)	
Year	No.	%	No.	%	No.	%
2022	7,902	54.36%	6,303	43.36%	332	2.28%

The county government operates the jail, maintains rural roads, operates the major local courts, records deeds, mortgages, and vital records, administers public health regulations, and participates with the state in the provision of social services. The county board of commissioners controls the budget and has limited authority to make laws or ordinances. In Michigan, most local government functions — police and fire, building and zoning, tax assessment, street maintenance, etc. — are the responsibility of individual cities and townships.

=== Elected officials ===
- Prosecuting Attorney: Robert L. Stratton III (AKA Rob Stratton)
- Sheriff: Michael Bitnar
- County Clerk: Steve Woodgate
- County Treasurer: Carmen Fazzari
- Register of Deeds: Gigi Ferro
- Drain Commissioner: Anthony Stackpoole
- County Surveyor: Robert Laitinen

(Current as of July 30, 2024)

== Transportation ==
=== Major highways ===
All Interstate and US Highways in Michigan are all state-maintained highways and part of the Michigan State Trunkline Highway System.

- I-75 is Michigan's longest state highway overall; it ends on the Sault Ste. Marie International Bridge at the Canada border.
- BS I-75 travels from I-75 into downtown Sault Ste. Marie, and ends at the ferry to Sugar Island.
- M-28 is Michigan's longest state highway; it ends at M-129 eight miles (13 km) south of Sault Ste. Marie.
- M-48 is a highway that goes through Pickford and Rudyard, and ends at exit 373 on I-75.
- M-80 is a highway that begins at exit 378 on I-75, goes through the former base in Kincheloe, and terminates at M-129.
- M-123 is a highway that is the main connector from Tahquamenon Falls to M-28.
- M-129 (also known as Meridian Road) runs through the eastern part of the county, and ends at BS I-75 just south of Sault Ste. Marie.
- M-134 is a highway that goes to and terminates on Drummond Island.
- M-221 is the shortest highway in Chippewa County, just going through Brimley and ending at M-28.

=== County-designated highways ===
The following highways are maintained by the Chippewa County Road Commission as part of the county road system. They are assigned numbers by the Michigan Department of Transportation as part of the County-Designated Highway System.

- H-40
- H-63 runs via Mackinac Trail, the former route of US 2 before it was replaced by I-75 in 1962.
- FFH 42(Whitefish Bay National Forest Scenic Byway), is a National Forest Scenic Byway with the US Forest Service the Chippewa County Road Commission jointly maintains.

=== Airports ===
- Chippewa County International Airport (CIU) serves Chippewa county and the surrounding communities, providing commercial connection to hub airports.
- Drummond Island Airport (DRM) is a public-owned, public-use general-aviation airport with 2 runways (1 hard-surfaced).

The Michigan Aerospace Manufacturers Association announced that Chippewa County will house its new command and control center. In last year, this is the third major announcement from the organization — guiding Michigan's aerospace and defense manufacturing community within the global industry. Previously, MAMA announced plans for a Oscoda, Michigan Wurtsmith Airport horizontal launch site at and a Marquette, Michigan vertical launch site.

== See also ==
- Delirium Wilderness
- List of Michigan State Historic Sites in Chippewa County
- National Register of Historic Places listings in Chippewa County, Michigan
