= Superior Township, Chippewa County, Michigan =

Superior Township, Michigan
- Civil township
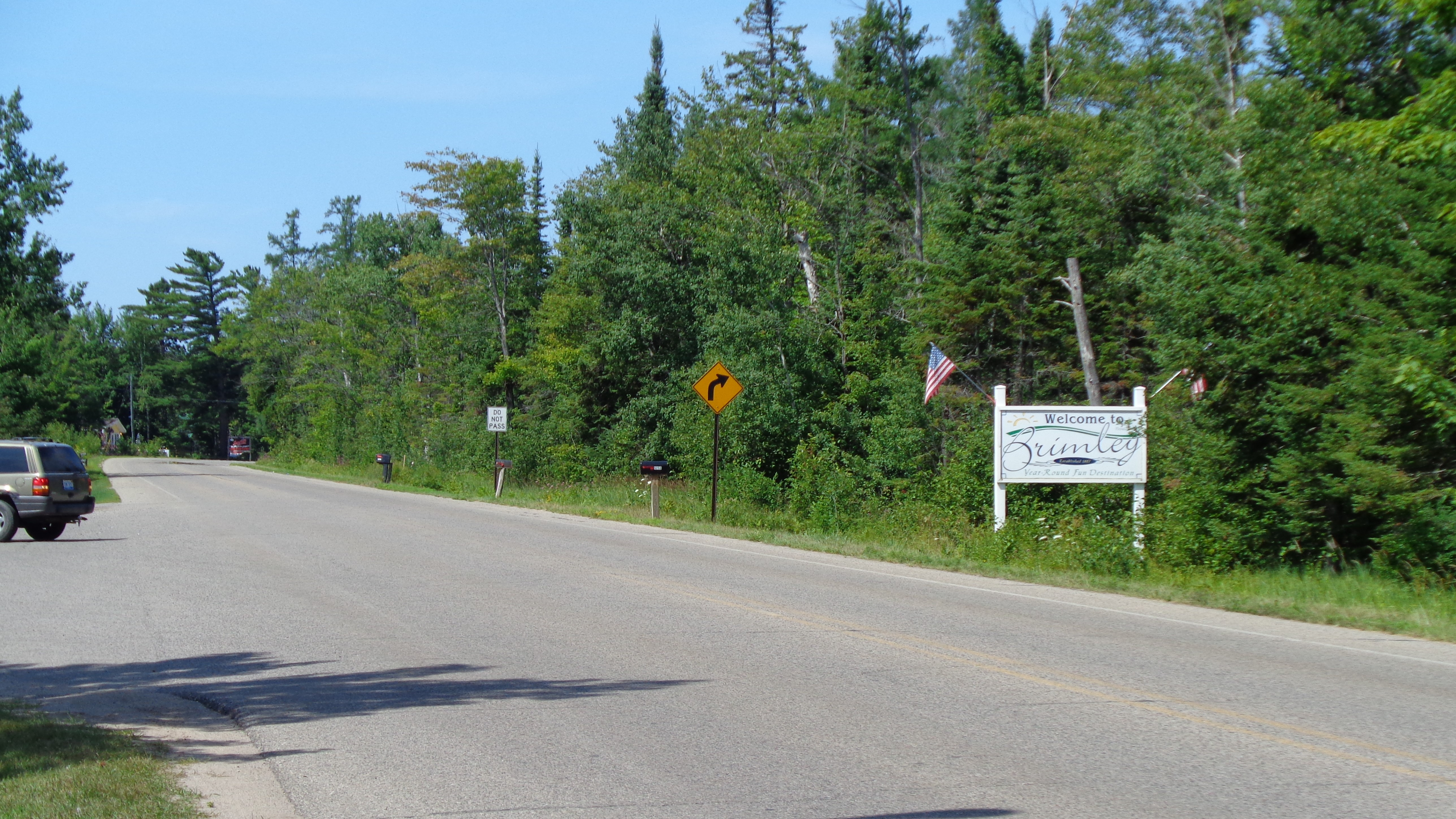
- Community of Brimley along W. 6 Mile Road

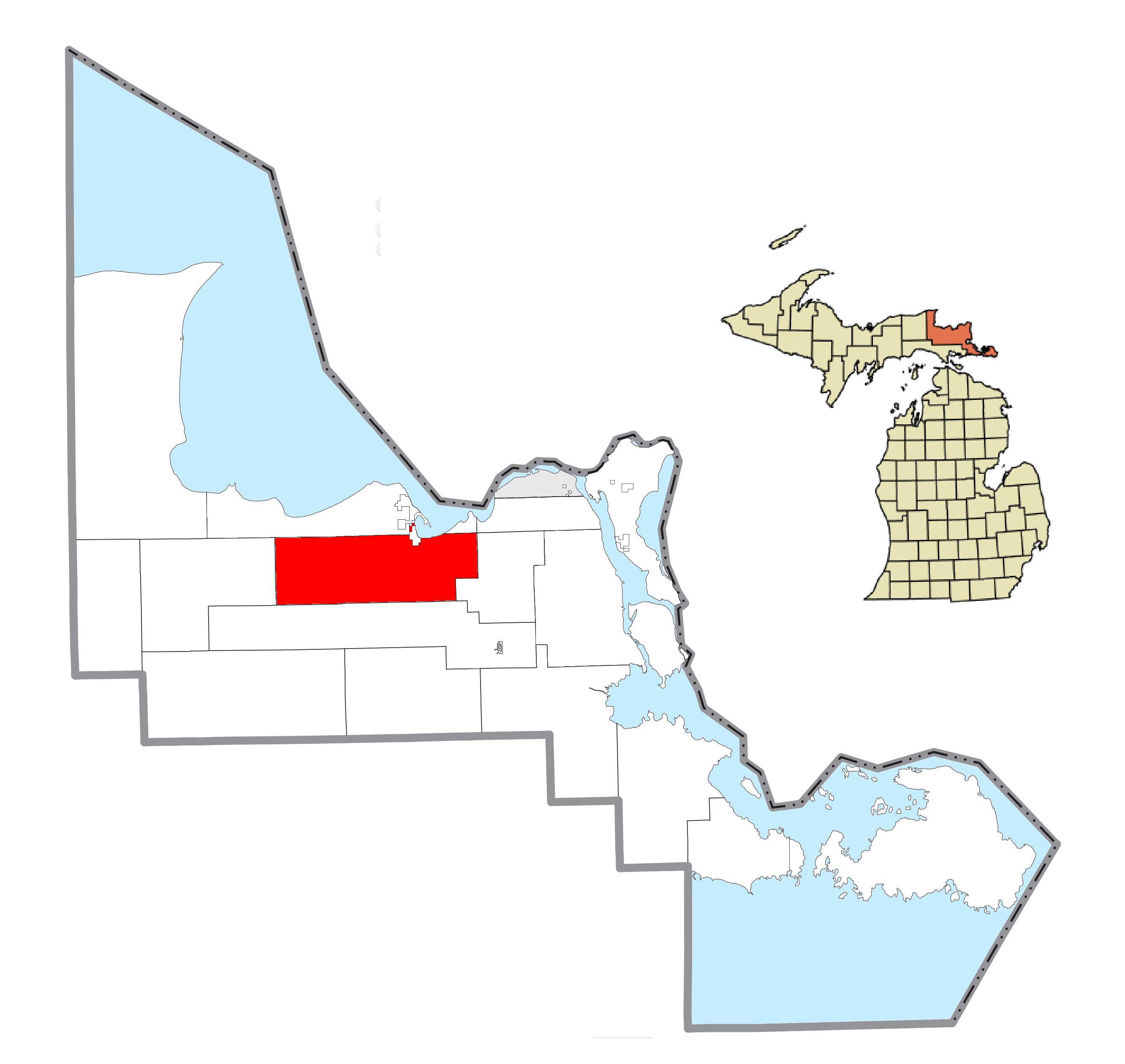
- Location within Chippewa County

- Location within the state of Michigan
- Coordinates: 46°22′40″N 84°39′28″W
- Country: United States
- State: Michigan
- County: Chippewa

Government
  - Supervisor: Richard Phillips

Area
  - Total: 104.7 sq mi (271.1 km^{2})
  - Land: 103.0 sq mi (266.7 km^{2})
  - Water: 1.7 sq mi (4.4 km^{2})
- Elevation: 810 ft (247 m)

Population (2020)
  - Total: 1,276
  - Density: 12.39/sq mi (4.784/km^{2})
- Time zone: UTC-5 (Eastern (EST))
  - Summer (DST): UTC-4 (EDT)
- ZIP code: 49715 (Brimley)
- Area code: 906
- FIPS code: 26-77540
- GNIS feature ID: 1627140

Superior Township is a civil township of Chippewa County in the U.S. state of Michigan. The population was 1,276 at the 2020 census.

The federally recognized Bay Mills Indian Community has part of its land base reservation in Superior Township, based west of Brimley. It operates two casinos on its reservation, one of which is in Superior Township, to generate funds for education and welfare of its people. Brimley State Park is also within the township on the shores of Lake Superior.

== Geography ==
Superior Township is located in north of the center of Chippewa County. According to the United States Census Bureau, the township has a total area of 104.7 square miles (271.1 km^{2}), of which 103.0 square miles (266.7 km^{2}) is land and 1.7 square miles (4.4 km^{2}), or 1.62%, is water.

The Delirium Wilderness is located several miles south of the community of Raco and extends into Kinross Township to the south.

== Communities ==
- Brimley is an unincorporated community and census-designated place (CDP) in the north of the township.
- Raco is an unincorporated community on M-28, about 8 miles (13 km) southwest of Brimley. The name comes from the acronym of the Richardson & Avery COmpany.

== Demographics ==
As of the census of 2000, there were 1,329 people, 515 households, and 384 families residing in the township. In 2010, its population then grew to 1,337.
