= Edison Sault Electric Company =

Edison Sault Electric Company was a public utility that provided electricity to the eastern portion of Michigan's Upper Peninsula. Its service area covered four counties (Chippewa, Mackinac, Schoolcraft and Delta).

== History ==
The company was founded in 1892 in Sault Ste. Marie.

Wisconsin Energy Corporation acquired the Edison Sault Electric Company with its purchase of its parent company, ESELCO in 1998.

In 2009, Wisconsin Energy announced it had reached a definitive agreement to sell Edison Sault Electric to the Cloverland Electric Cooperative of Dafter.

== System information ==
Edison Sault's only generating station was the Saint Marys Falls Hydropower Plant located on the St. Marys River in downtown Sault Ste. Marie. During the night when demand was low, the company was able to sell power from this small dam to larger companies such as Upper Peninsula Power Company and Consumers Energy. Edison Sault's transmission system voltage is 138,000 volts. The subtransmission system voltage is 69,000 volts. The distribution system voltage is 13,200 volts.

== Interconnections ==
Edison Sault had four 138 kV interconnections with other utilities. Two were with Consumers Energy in lower Michigan. (McGulpin-Straits #1 and McGulpin-Straits #2) These two lines are submerged under the Straits of Mackinac. Edison Sault has two interconnections with its former sister company, Wisconsin Electric (Arnold-Indian Lake #1 and Arnold-Indian Lake #2).

Edison Sault had interconnections with Cloverland Electric and Upper Peninsula Power on its 69 kV subtransmission system.

== See also ==
- Edison Sault Power Canal—canal that serves the hydropower plant
- Lists of public utilities
