= Ashmun =

Ashmun is a surname that may refer to:

- Eli P. Ashmun (1770–1819), Massachusetts State Representative 1803–04, Massachusetts State Senator 1808–10, Massachusetts Governor's Councilman 1816, U.S. Senator from Massachusetts 1816–18. Father of George Ashmun
- George Ashmun (1804–1870), Massachusetts State Representative 1833–37, Massachusetts State Senator 1838–40, U.S. Representative from Massachusetts 1845–51, delegate to the Republican National Convention 1860. Son of Eli P. Ashmun
- George Parish Ashmun, doctor and state senator in Ohio who served in the Union Army and served as mayor of Hudson, Ohio
- Jehudi Ashmun (April 21, 1794 – August 25, 1828), religious leader and social reformer in New England
- Margaret Ashmun (July 10, 1875 – March 15, 1940), writer from Wisconsin

== See also ==
- Ashmun Institute, predecessor of Lincoln University (Pennsylvania)
- Ashmun Street in Monrovia, Liberia
- Ashmun Bay in Michigan
