= Parker Road–Charlotte River Bridge =

- U.S. National Register of Historic Places
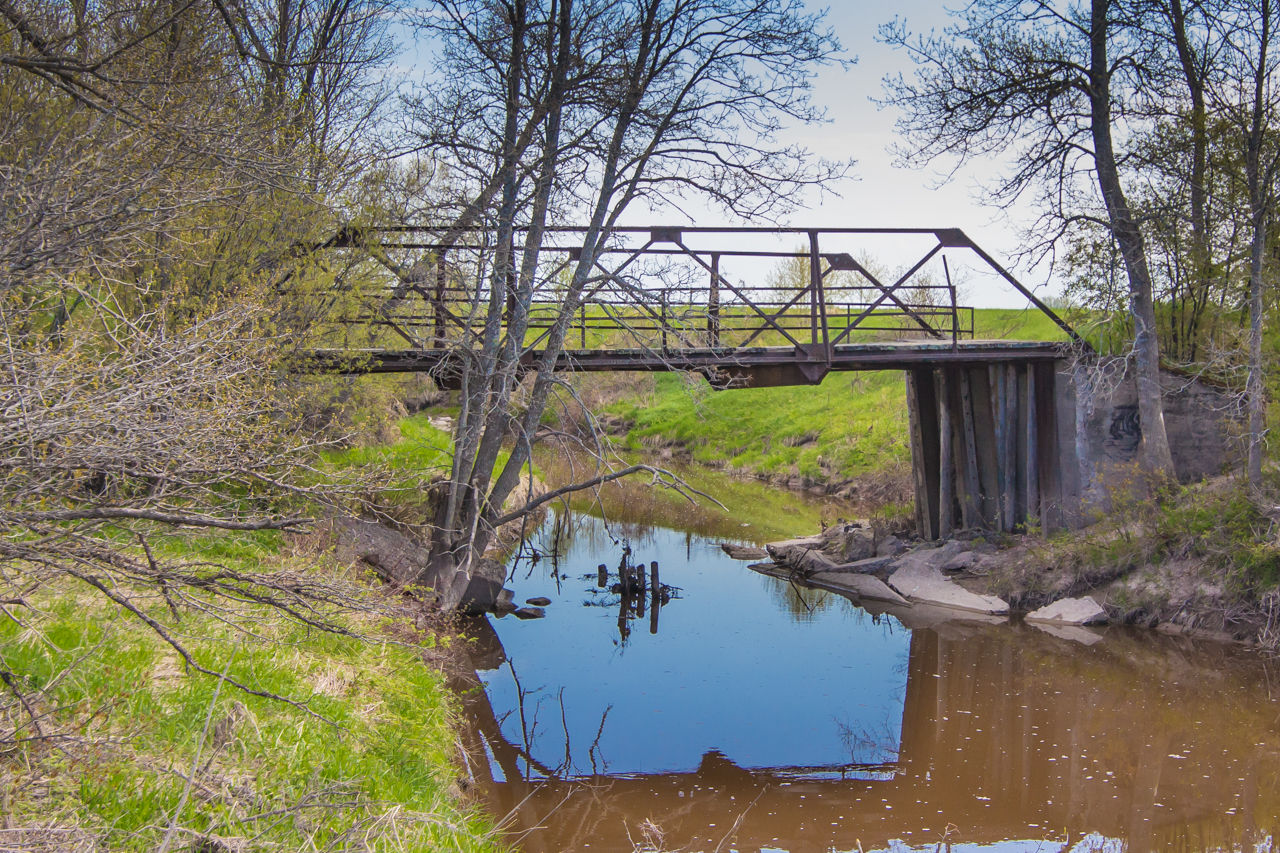

- Location within Michigan Location within the United States
- Interactive map
- Location: E. 10 Mile Rd. over Charlotte River, Bruce Township, Michigan
- Coordinates: 46°21′45″N 84°17′24″W
- Area: less than one acre
- Built: 1914
- Built by: Minneapolis Bridge Company
- Architectural style: Warren Pony Truss
- MPS: Highway Bridges of Michigan MPS
- NRHP reference No.: 00000009
- Added to NRHP: January 28, 2000

The Parker Road–Charlotte River Bridge, also known as the 10 Mile Road–Charlotte River Bridge, is a bridge building located on Parker Road (now East 10-Mile Road) over the Charlotte River in Bruce Township, Michigan. It was listed on the National Register of Historic Places in 2000.

== Description ==
The Parker Road–Charlotte River Bridge is a three-panel, rigid-connected Warren Pony Truss bridge; the structural members of the bridge are made pairs of steel angles connected back-to-back, rather than the more traditional box beams. I-beams supporting the wooden deck are bolted to the upright truss. The bridge spans 51.8 feet (15.8 m) with a width of 16.4 feet (5.0 m), and sits on concrete abutments with angled wingwalls. The span has been recently braced with timber pilings in the center, but otherwise is relatively unchanged. The bridge is closed to traffic and is no longer maintained.

== Historic context ==
In the era before standard bridge designs were drafted by the Michigan State Highway Department, local road commissions were tempted to reduce costs by using lighter two-angle superstructure elements, as in this bridge. This bridge was built in 1914 by the Minneapolis Bridge Company, likely at the behest of the Bruce Township Board. It is the only example of this type of two-angle superstructure truss bridge in Michigan that has been definitively dated.
