= Lime Island State Recreation Area =

State park in Michigan, United States

- Location within Michigan Location within the United States
- Location: Lime Island, Michigan, USA
- Coordinates: 46°05′17″N 84°00′40″W
- Area: 980 acres (400 ha)
- Established: 2011
- Governing body: Michigan Department of Natural Resources
- Website: Official website

Lime Island State Recreation Area is a 980 acres (400 ha) (Note: Most sources state 980 acres (400 ha), except the main website for the state park which claims 900 acres (360 ha).) undeveloped state park in the U.S. state of Michigan. The recreation area is located on Lime Island in the St. Marys River near its mouth. The park has no facilities except 5 primitive boat-in campsites. The park was purchased in 1982 and managed by the state's Forest Management Division until it was transferred to the Parks Department in 2011, becoming the 99th park unit. Lime Island contains historic sites from its history as summer camps of Woodland Indians, a lime kiln site, ship bunkering site, and a resort. Lime Island was one of the state forest campgrounds slated to be shut down due to funding cuts until it was transferred to the park program.

The island has occasional moose and black bear. Hunting, hiking and fishing are allowed in the park.
