= Charlotte River (Michigan) =

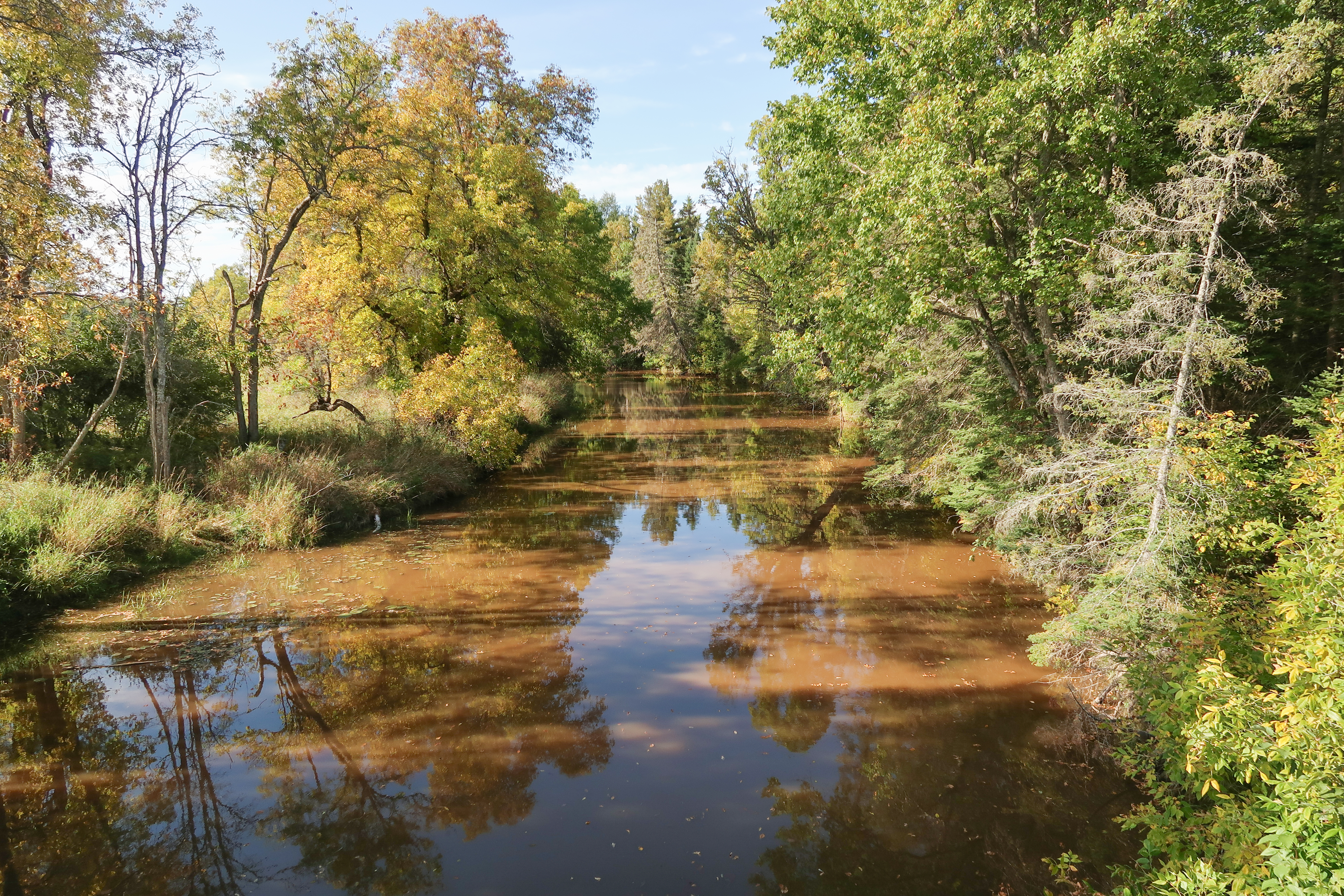
- The Charlotte River in Bruce Township

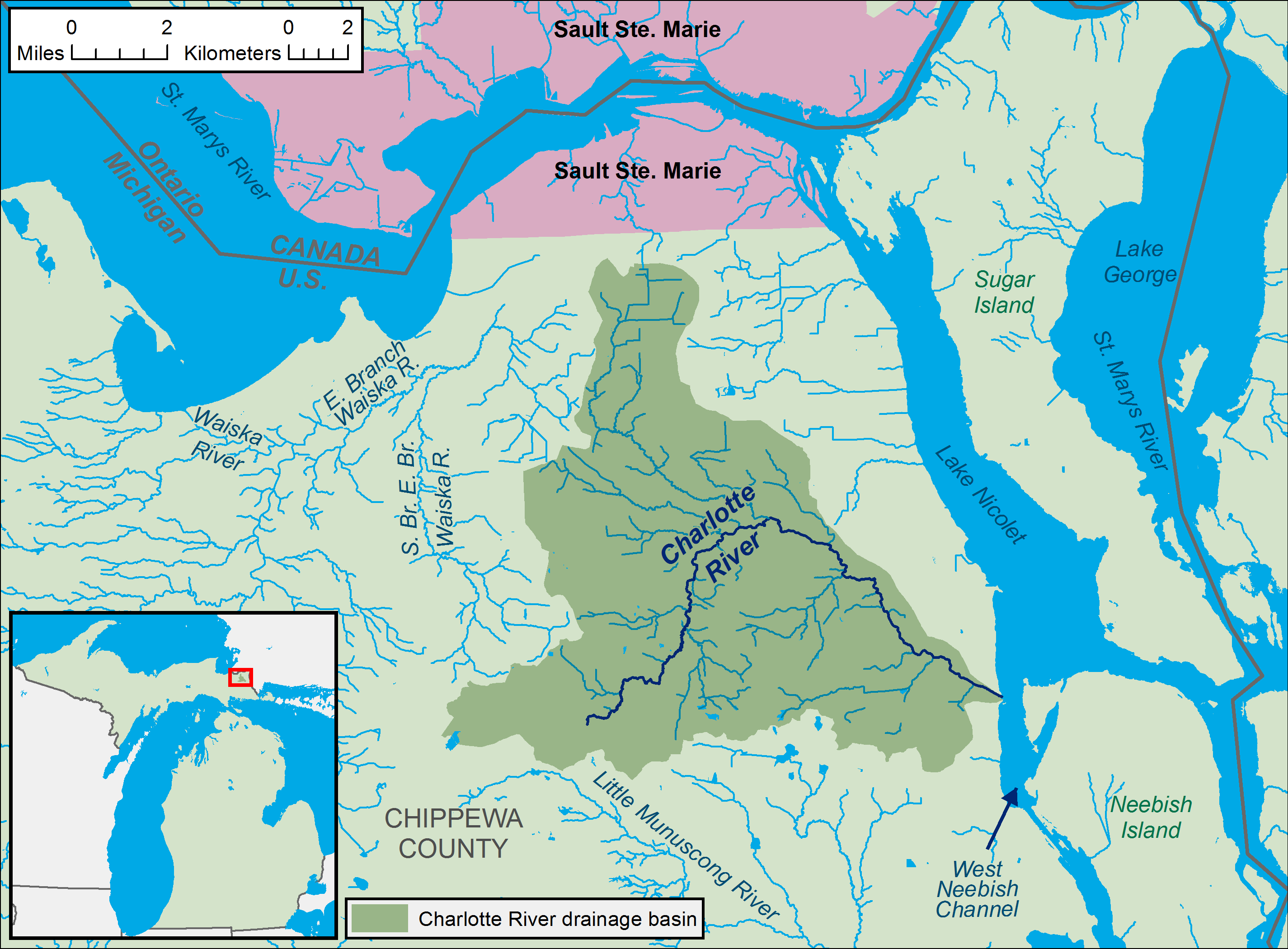
- A map of the Charlotte River and its watershed.

Location
- Country: United States
- State: Michigan
- County: Chippewa
- Townships: Dafter, Bruce

Physical characteristics
- Source
  - location: Dafter Township
  - coordinates: 46.314464°N 84.4028184°W
  - elevation: 680 ft (210 m)
- Mouth
  - location: West Neebish Channel, St. Marys River, Dafter Township
  - coordinates: 46.3186299°N 84.2205869°W
  - elevation: 581 ft (177 m)
- Length: 17.1 miles (27.5 km)
- Basin size: 58.4 mi^{2} (151 km^{2})
- Discharge
  - location: mouth
  - average: 57.83 cu ft/s (1.638 m^{3}/s) (estimate)

Basin features
- Progression: St. Marys—Lake Huron—St. Clair—Lake St. Clair—Detroit—Lake Erie—Niagara—Lake Ontario—St. Lawrence—Atlantic Ocean
- Population: 3,451 (2010 estimate)
- Tributaries
  - right: Spring Creek
- Hydrologic Unit Codes: 040700010203, 040700010204 (USGS)

The Charlotte River is a tributary of the St. Marys River in the state of Michigan in the United States. The stream is 17.1 miles (27.5 km) long and drains an area of 58.4 square miles (151 km^{2}) on the eastern Upper Peninsula. Via the St. Marys River, it is part of the watershed of Lake Huron. Via Lake Huron and the Great Lakes system, it is part of the larger watershed of the St. Lawrence River.

== Course ==
The river's entire length and watershed are in eastern Chippewa County. As defined by the United States Geological Survey's National Hydrography Dataset, the river begins in southeastern Dafter Township, approximately 3.4 miles (5.5 km) south-southeast of the unincorporated community of Dafter. It flows for most of its length in Bruce Township, initially northeastward before turning southeastward at the unincorporated locality of Rosedale. It flows into the West Neebish Channel of the St. Marys River, opposite the northern end of Neebish Island and approximately 13.5 miles (21.7 km) southeast of Sault Ste. Marie, Michigan.

Some maps show the river's course upstream of Rosedale as the South Branch Charlotte River, with the name "Charlotte River" upstream of this point assigned to a southeastward flowing tributary. In the National Hydrography Dataset, this tributary appears only as an unnamed stream. (Note: The confluence of the two streams is at 46.374951°N 84.319954°W) "South Branch Charlotte River" is also listed in the Geographic Names Information System as a variant name.

The National Hydrography Dataset lists one named tributary in the Charlotte River watershed, Spring Creek, a right tributary approximately 3.6 miles (5.8 km) long.

Near its mouth the river flows through Michigan State University's Dunbar Forest Experiment Station, an off-campus forest management research area.

== Watershed characteristics ==
The Charlotte River watershed consists of two HUC-12 subwatersheds, as defined by the United States Geological Survey:

Name	HUC-12 code	Area
Headwaters Charlotte River	040700010203	27.6 square miles (71 km^{2})
Charlotte River	040700010204	30.8 square miles (80 km^{2})

In addition to Dafter and Bruce townships, the Charlotte River also drains a small portion of Soo Township. The watershed is located in a predominantly rural region, much of which has been drained for agriculture, logging, and development. Soils in the region are primarily poorly drained clays over limestone and dolomite bedrock. On average, the region receives approximately 32 inches (81 cm) of precipitation annually, and there is usually heavy snow cover in the winter. Runoff from artesian wells contributes to the turbidity that is typical of the region's streams.

According to a 2012 report prepared for the United States Environmental Protection Agency and the Michigan Department of Environmental Quality, the watershed had an estimated population of 3,451 as of the 2010 U.S. Census. (Note: 1,184 people in the Charlotte River Headwaters subwatershed and 2,267 in the Charlotte River subwatershed.) There were an estimated 1,562 households, all of which were serviced by onsite sanitary disposal systems. Land use in the Charlotte River watershed was reported as follows:

Land use	Percentage	Area
Forests	27%	10,069 acres (4,075 ha)
Wetlands	25%	9,152 acres (3,704 ha)
Cropland	24%	8,871 acres (3,590 ha)
Pasture	18%	6,612 acres (2,676 ha)
Low-intensity development and open space	3%	1,215 acres (492 ha)
Grassland	3%	1,067 acres (432 ha)
Bare land	0.4%	158 acres (64 ha)
High- and medium-intensity development	0.4%	154 acres (62 ha)
Open water	0.08%	30 acres (12 ha)

== See also ==
- Parker Road–Charlotte River Bridge
- List of rivers of Michigan
