= Lime Island =

Island in Chippewa County, Michigan

- Location within Michigan

Geography
- Location: St. Marys River
- Coordinates: 46.0864075°N 83.9988995°W
- Area: 900 acres (360 ha)
- Highest elevation: 640 ft (195 m)

Administration
- United States
- State: Michigan
- County: Chippewa
- Township: Raber

Lime Island is an island in the St. Marys River in Raber, Chippewa County, Michigan. The 1.41 sq. mile island is home to the Lime Island State Recreation Area. Besides a few cabins and camp sites the island remains covered in forest, which hosts the island's population of black bear. There are several smaller islands that surround Lime island. The islands of Hart, Edward, Love, and Bass Reef are northeast of Lime Island, and Little Lime Island lies to the southeast.
