= Bruce Township, Chippewa County, Michigan =

Bruce Township, Michigan
- Civil township
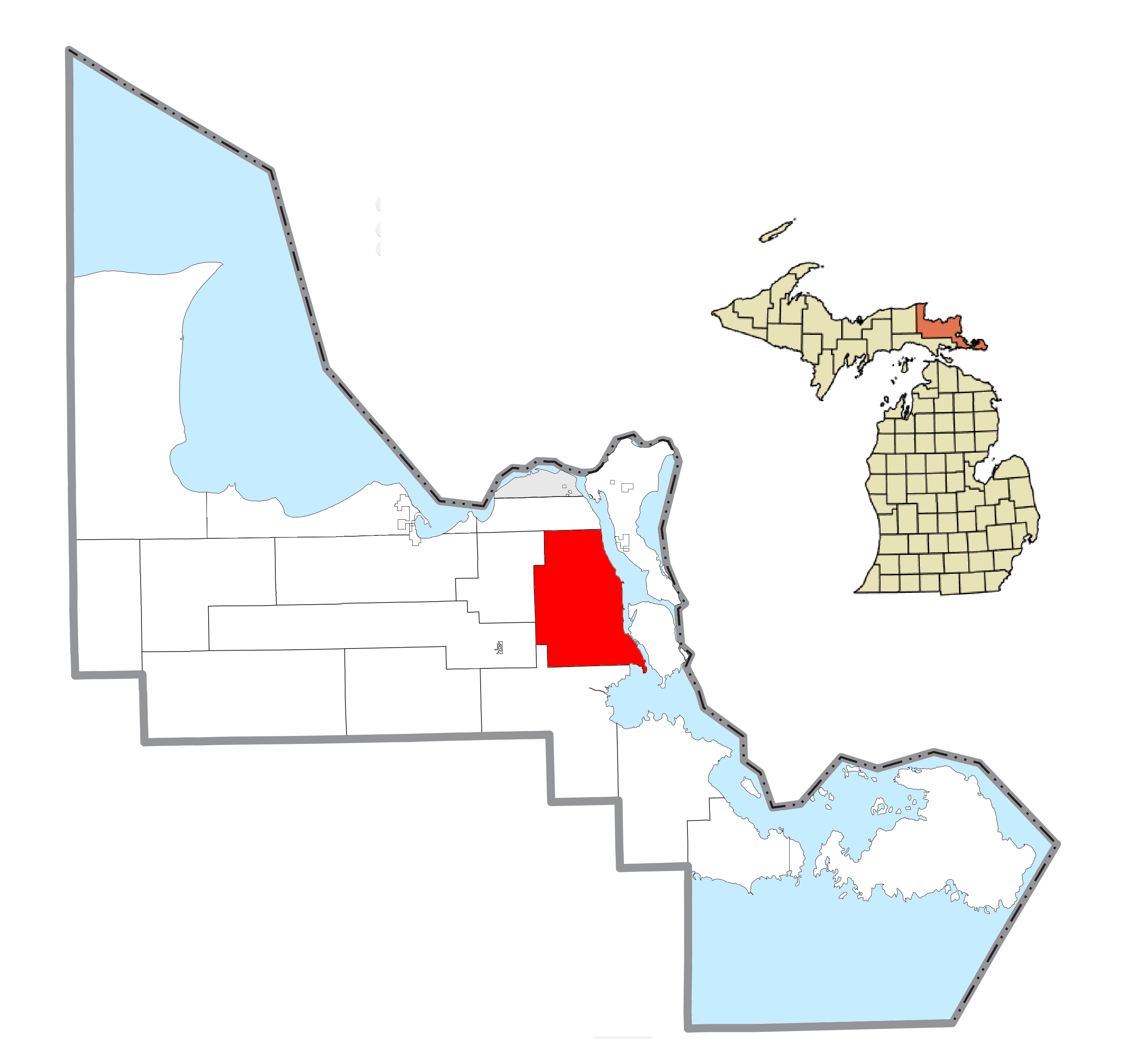
- Location within Chippewa County

- Location within the state of Michigan
- Coordinates: 46°20′12″N 84°18′42″W
- Country: United States
- State: Michigan
- County: Chippewa

Government
  - Supervisor: Carl Marsh

Area
  - Total: 90.7 sq mi (234.8 km^{2})
  - Land: 87.0 sq mi (225.3 km^{2})
  - Water: 3.7 sq mi (9.5 km^{2})
- Elevation: 653 ft (199 m)

Population (2020)
  - Total: 2,000
  - Density: 23/sq mi (8.9/km^{2})
- Time zone: UTC-5 (Eastern (EST))
  - Summer (DST): UTC-4 (EDT)
- ZIP code(s): 49710 (Barbeau); 49724 (Dafter); 49774 (Pickford); 49783 (Sault Ste. Marie)
- Area code: 906
- FIPS code: 26-11280
- GNIS feature ID: 1625994
- Website: Official website

Bruce Township is a civil township of Chippewa County in the U.S. state of Michigan. As of the 2020 census, the township population was 2,000.

== Geography ==
Bruce Township is in eastern Chippewa County, bordered on the east by the St. Marys River and West Neebish Channel. The Charlotte River flows through the township to its mouth at the West Neebish Channel. M-129 runs through the western part of the township, leading north to Sault Ste. Marie and south to Pickford and Cedarville. According to the United States Census Bureau, the township has a total area of 90.7 square miles (234.8 km^{2}), of which 87.0 square miles (225.3 km^{2}) is land and 3.7 square miles (9.5 km^{2}), or 4.04%, is water.

== Communities ==
- Barbeau is an unincorporated community about 15 miles (24 km) south of Sault Ste. Marie at 46°17′19″N 84°16′52″W. The ZIP code is 49710. East of Barbeau is an area along the Saint Marys River where Great Lakes freighters can be seen at relatively close distance.

== Demographics ==
As of the census of 2000, there were 1,940 people, 748 households, and 572 families residing in the township. The population density was 22.2 inhabitants per square mile (8.6/km^{2}). There were 986 housing units at an average density of 11.3 per square mile (4.4/km^{2}). The racial makeup of the township was 83.87% White, 0.52% African American, 11.75% Native American, 0.15% Asian, 0.05% from other races, and 3.66% from two or more races. Hispanic or Latino of any race were 0.72% of the population.

There were 748 households, out of which 32.9% had children under the age of 18 living with them, 65.1% were married couples living together, 7.2% had a female householder with no husband present, and 23.5% were non-families. 19.8% of all households were made up of individuals, and 7.1% had someone living alone who was 65 years of age or older. The average household size was 2.59 and the average family size was 2.95.

In the township the population was spread out, with 25.7% under the age of 18, 6.4% from 18 to 24, 29.7% from 25 to 44, 25.7% from 45 to 64, and 12.4% who were 65 years of age or older. The median age was 38 years. For every 100 females, there were 105.7 males. For every 100 females age 18 and over, there were 106.4 males.

The median income for a household in the township was $39,207, and the median income for a family was $42,800. Males had a median income of $35,938 versus $21,857 for females. The per capita income for the township was $16,666. About 4.3% of families and 7.8% of the population were below the poverty line, including 9.8% of those under age 18 and 7.6% of those age 65 or over.
