= 3D Hydrography Program =

3D database of water features in the United States

The 3D Hydrography Program (3DHP) is a United States-wide hydrography dataset produced by the United States Geological Survey (USGS). It is the successor to the now retired National Hydrography Dataset (NHD) and uses data from the USGS 3D Elevation Program, which similarly succeeded the National Elevation Dataset in 2014. The 3DHP dataset includes natural and man-made water features such as: rivers, lakes, drains, springs, sinks, canals, culverts, and pipelines. Unlike the NHD, the 3DHP does not make a distinction between lakes and ponds, and between rivers and streams. Named features include GNIS IDs which can specify a stream versus a river however.

As a product of the US Government, the dataset is in the public domain. The 3DHP is the first nationwide remapping of water in the United States since 1992. The first new data was made available as a service in October 2023. Complete coverage of the United States is expected to be done in 2032.

3DHP includes Elevation-derived hydrography (EDH), which is a detailed dataset of water features generated from elevation data, such as digital elevation models (DEMs). EDH addresses the requirement for hydrographic data that align with corresponding elevation datasets, which is essential for applications like flood modeling. Integrating hydrographic and elevation data is challenging when they do not spatially align.

== Getting the data ==
See: Access 3DHP Data Products | U.S. Geological Survey

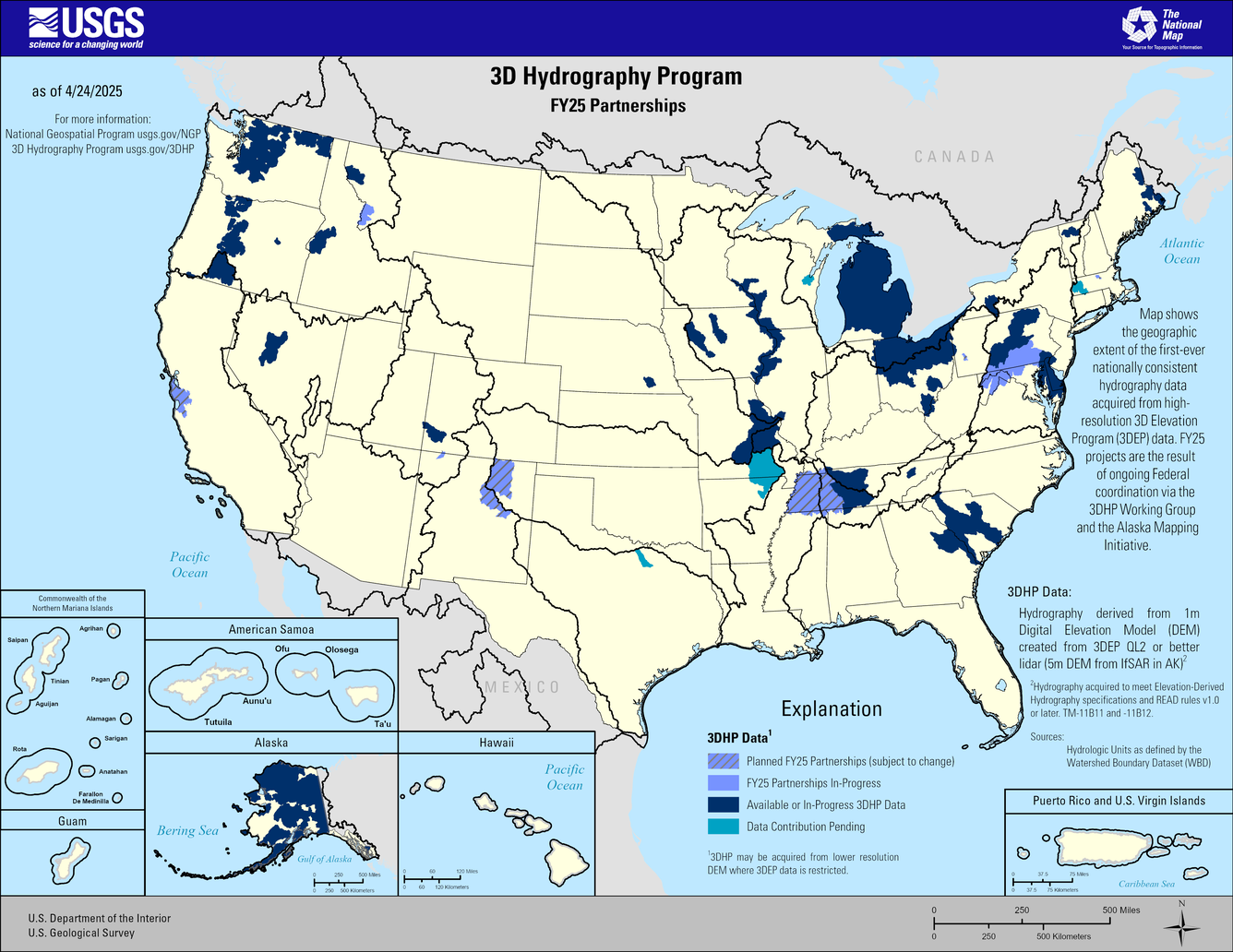
A map of areas in the continental US currently served by the new 3D Hydrography Program surveys as of May, 2025

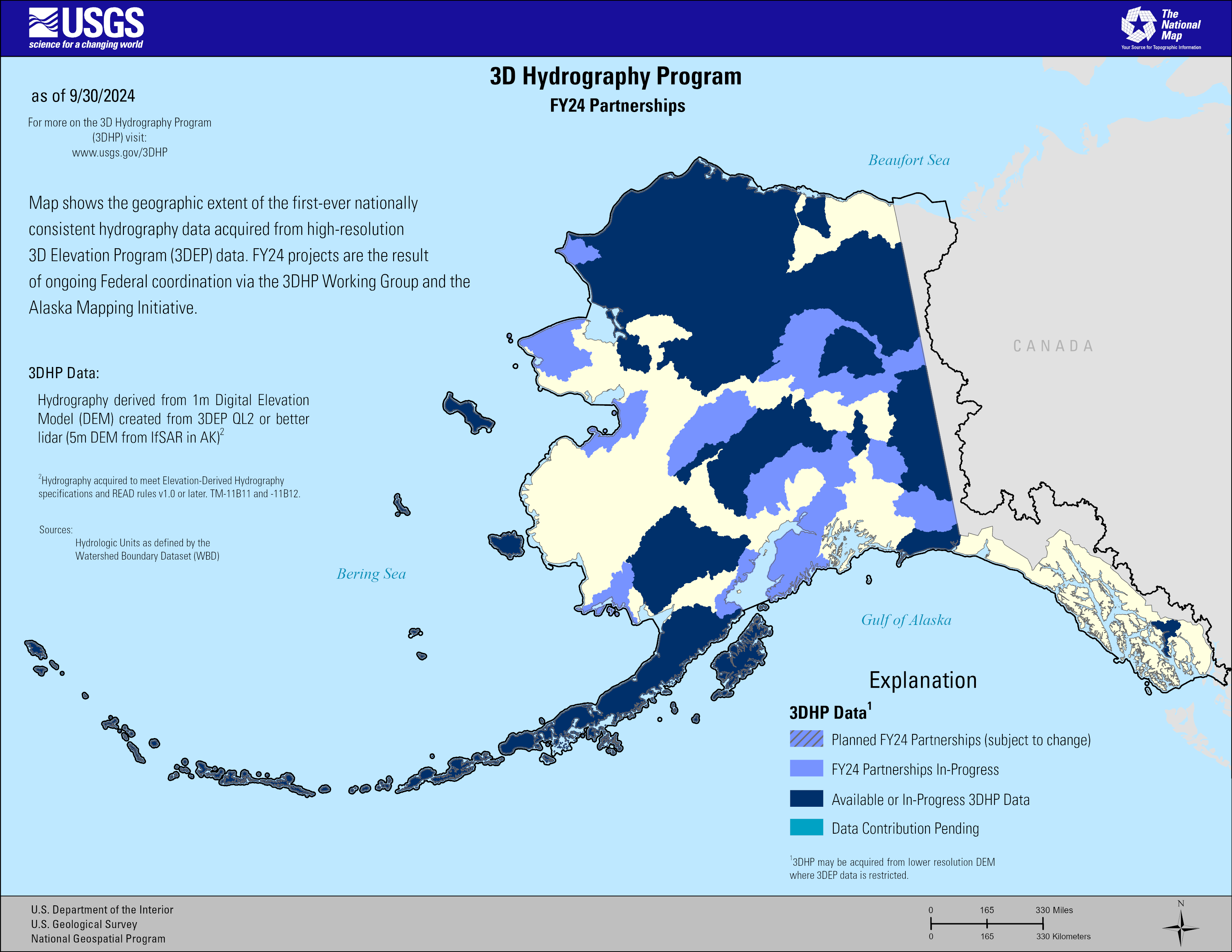
A map of areas in Alaska currently served by the new 3D Hydrography Program surveys as of September, 2024

As of November 2025, the 3DHP is not fully updated for all regions of the country, and thus data is divided into current and legacy data.

The GIS web service usgs_3dhp_all can be found through 3dhp.nationalmap.gov. This service returns data from the old NHD wherever new data is not available.

To filter out NHD data from the web service, workunitid<>'NHD' can be used.

A downloadable copy of the data as of 2024 is available at 3D Hydrography Program (3DHP) 2024 Staged Product (FY25 Release) - ScienceBase-Catalog. The Alaska file is approximately 1.7 gigabytes in FileGDB format or 3 GB as a GeoPackage. The continental United States file is 11 GB in FileGDB format or 20 GB as a GeoPackage.

Eventually there should be 3DHP data available from the USGS National Map.

== Data structure and fields ==
The data in the 3DHP is structured into several different types of features:

- Hydro locations (points)
- Flowlines (lines)
- Waterbodies (polygons)
- Drainage areas (polygons)
- Catchments (polygons)

Drainage areas and catchments are probably not relevant to OpenStreetMap. The flowlines and waterbodies would be the most likely to be of interest.

=== Common fields ===
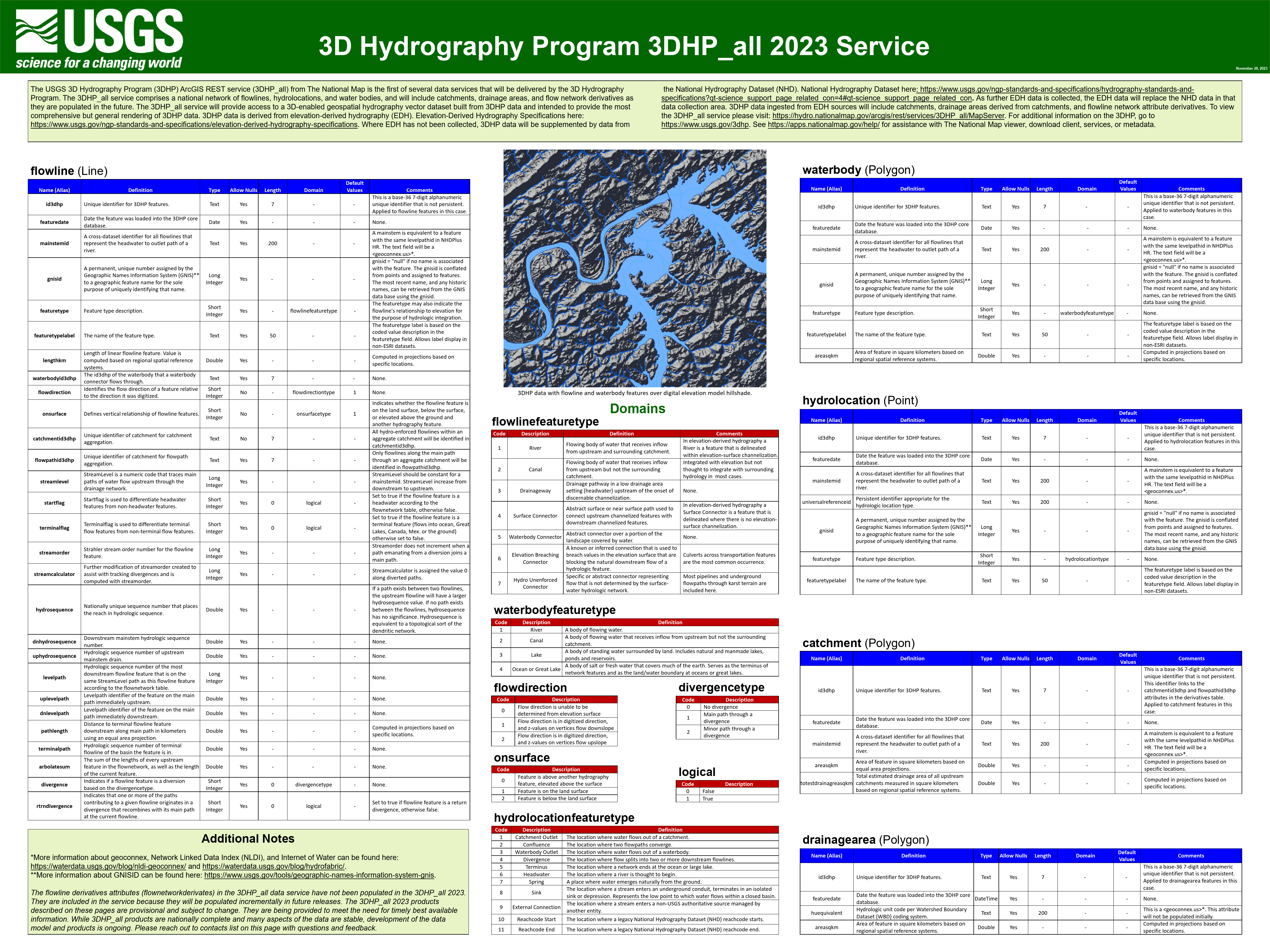
A detailed description of the data fields found in the 3D hydrography program datasets

- id3dhp: Unique identifier
- featuredate: Date the feature was created
- mainstemid: A url representing a Main stem (example 1, example 2)
- gnisid: gnis:feature_id
- gnisidlabel: name
- featuretype: Indicator of the type of feature
- featuretypelabel: Text description of the above (‘River’, ‘Canal’, ...)

== Reading ==
Simley, J.D., Carswell Jr., W.J., 2009, The National Map—Hydrography: U.S. Geological Survey Fact Sheet 2009–3054, 4 p.
