= George Parish Ashmun =

American doctor and politician

George Parish Ashmun (1818–1873) was a medical doctor who served in the Union Army. He was a mayor and a state senator in Ohio.

== Biography ==
Ashmun was born May 22, 1818, in St. Lawrence County, New York, and in 1833 he moved with his family to Tallmadge, Ohio. While here he acquired his education and qualification as a doctor. Over his career he worked as a doctor in Coston, Hudson and Akron.

He was elected to the Ohio State Senate in 1857 and represented Summit County, Ohio, and Portage County, Ohio. He served on the Committee on Benevolent Public Institutions. He also served on the standing committee of Public Printing.

He entered into military service after the Battle of Pittsburg Landing and he was appointed by the governor of Ohio to take charge of the wounded. He worked in the Sanitary commission until August 1862 when he became the surgeon of the 93d Regiment O.V.I. where he served until August 1864.

He was in the Battle of Chickamauga, was taken prisoner, and nearly three months in Libby Prison.

He served as mayor of Hudson, Ohio.

At one point he lived at 29 Aurora Street in Hudson that was demolished in 1970.

== See also ==
- List of United States political families (A)#The Ashmuns
- Ashmun
