= Sault Ste. Marie International Railroad Bridge =

Bridge connecting Canada and the United States

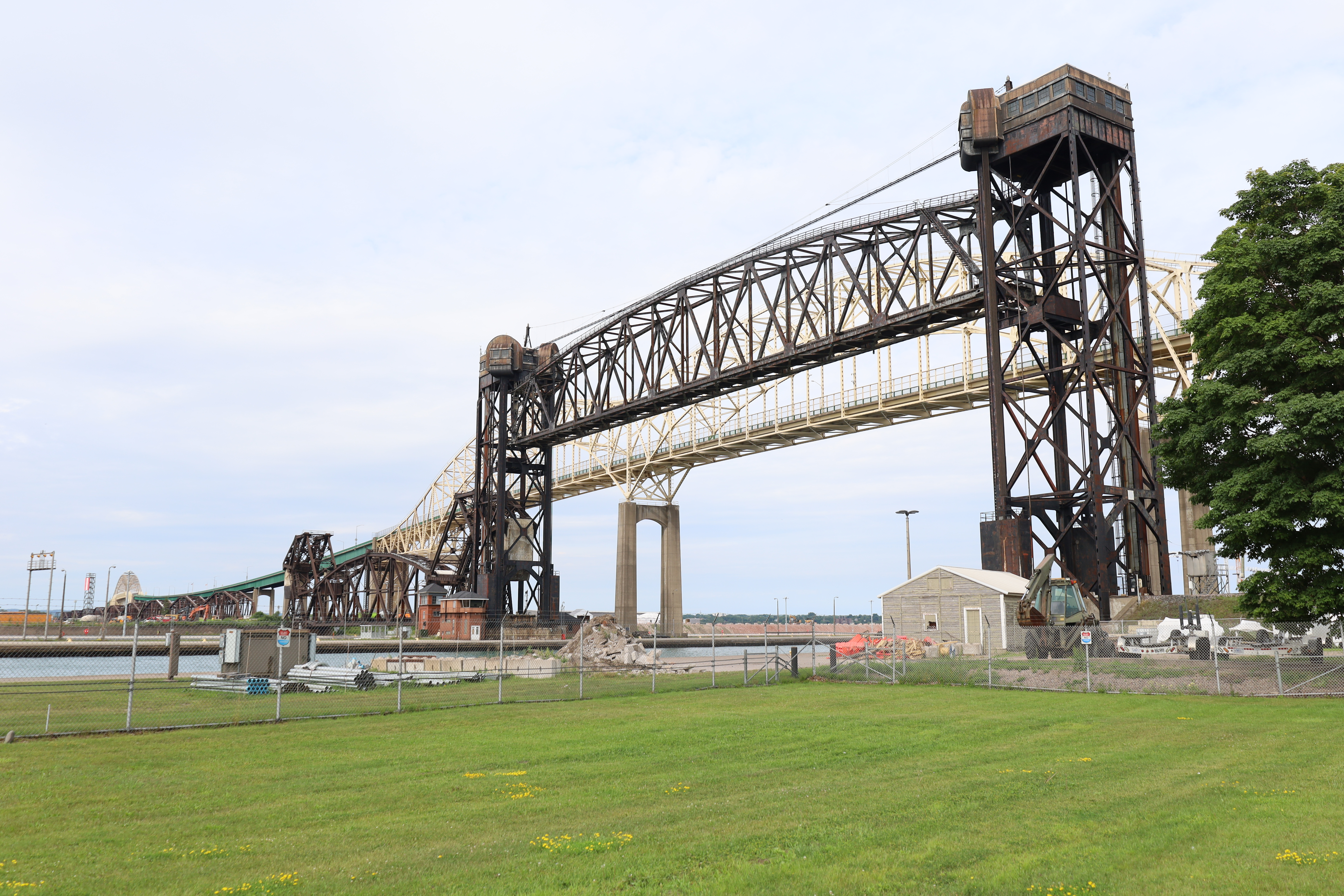
- The two drawspans on the American side in 2025
- Coordinates: 46°30′27″N 84°21′43″W
- Carries: CN Manistique Subdivision
- Crosses: St. Marys River
- Locale: Sault Ste. Marie, Michigan and Sault Ste. Marie, Ontario
- Maintained by: Canadian National Railway

Characteristics
- Design: Plate girder bridges Camelback truss bridge Double-leaf bascule bridge Vertical-lift bridge Swing bridge
- Material: Steel
- Total length: 5,580 feet (1,700 m)
- Width: 21 feet (6.4 m) to 23 feet (7.0 m)
- Longest span: 369 feet (112 m)
- No. of spans: 9 (truss bridge)

History
- Designer: Strauss Bascule Bridge Company (bascule)
- Constructed by: Dominion Bridge Company (truss); Pennsylvania Steel Company (bascule)
- Construction end: 1887 (truss); 1895 (swing); 1915 (bascule); 1960 (lift)

Location
- Interactive map of Sault Ste. Marie International Railroad Bridge

The Sault Ste. Marie Railroad Bridge was originally built in 1887 to facilitate rail traffic crossing St. Marys River and the international border between Sault Ste. Marie, Michigan and Sault Ste. Marie, Ontario. It runs parallel to the Sault Ste. Marie International Bridge.

== Description ==
The bridge carries the CN Manistique Subdivision over the St. Mary's River, which includes the Soo Locks Canals in Michigan, the St. Mary's Falls in Michigan & Ontario, the Sault Ste. Marie Canal in Ontario, and finally the remainder of the river in Ontario.

It consists, from south to north, of a small plate girder bridge overpass spanning West Pier Drive, a lift bridge, a bascule bridge, a nine-span thru-truss bridge, a swing bridge, and finally another plate girder bridge. The earliest part of the bridge where the thru-truss spans, which were completed in 1887. As the Soo Locks were enlarged for larger ships, some of the thru-truss spans were removed and replaced by lift, bascular and swing bridges.

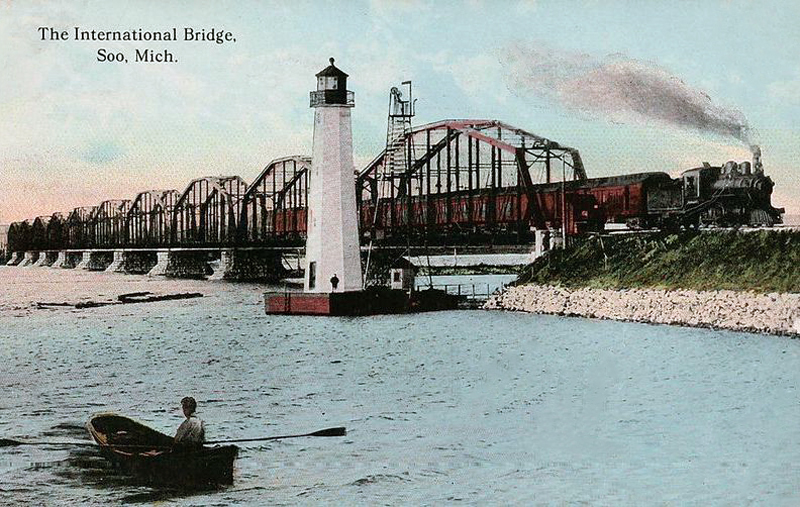
A 1914 postcard showing the bridge

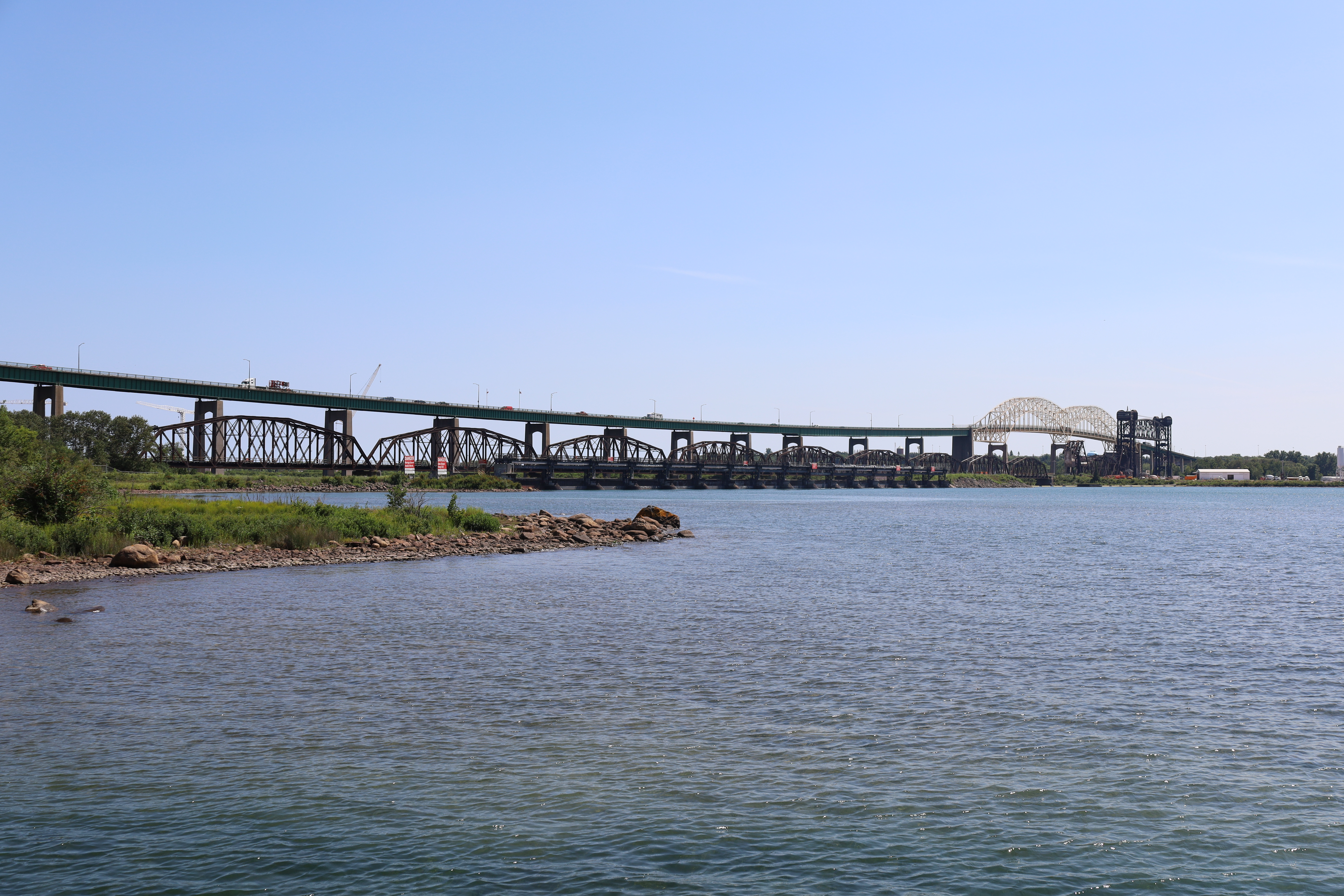
The Railroad Bridge in 2025, with the road bridge behind it

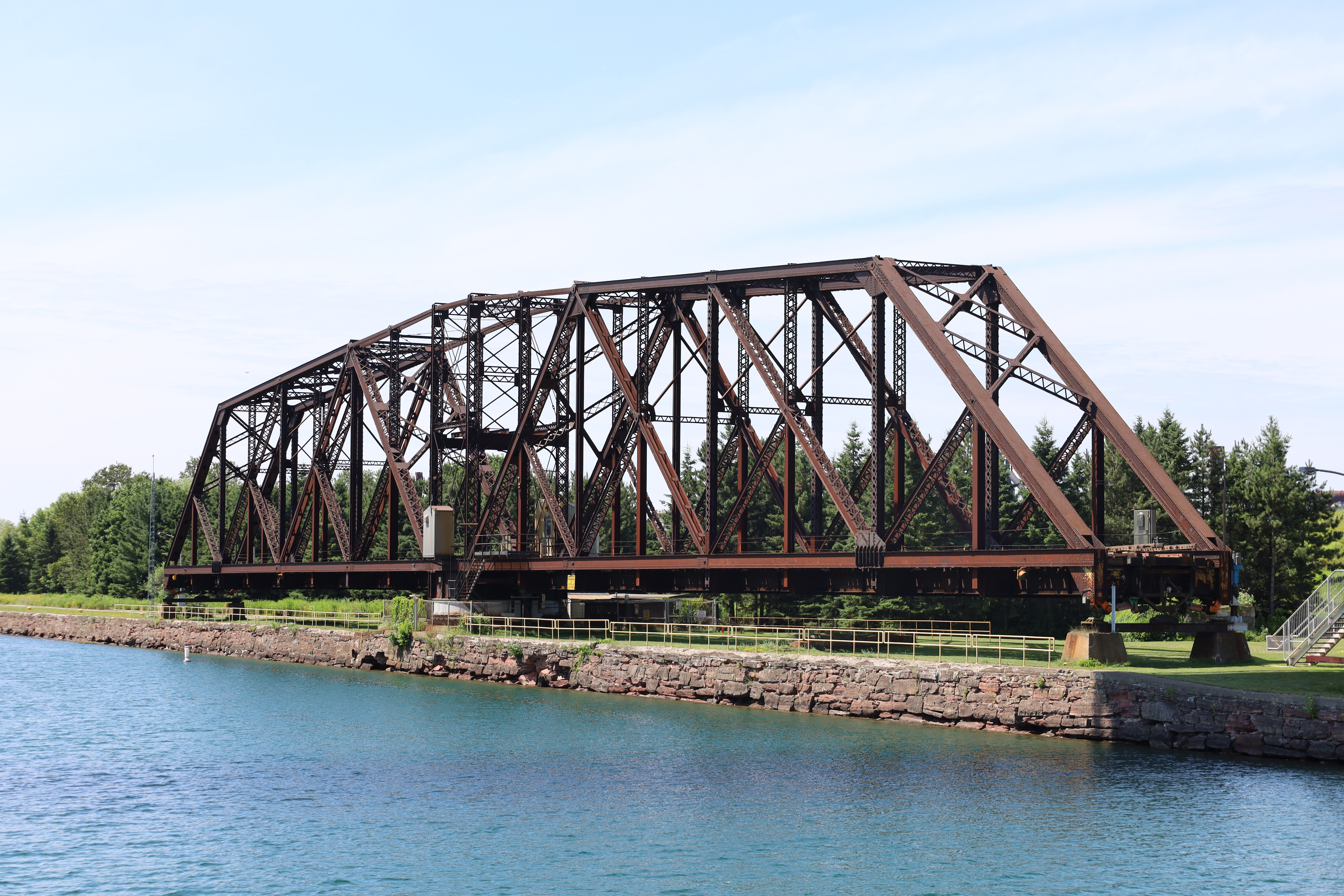
The swing span on the Canadian side in the open position in 2025

== See also ==
- Buffalo and Fort Erie Public Bridge Authority – public, Peace Bridge
- Detroit International Bridge Company – private, Ambassador Bridge
- Niagara Falls Bridge Commission – public, Lewiston-Queenston Bridge, Whirlpool Rapids Bridge and Rainbow Bridge
- Thousand Islands Bridge Authority – public, Thousand Islands Bridge
- Windsor-Detroit Bridge Authority – public, Gordie Howe International Bridge
- List of international bridges in North America
