= Edison Sault Power Canal =

Canal in Michigan, United States of America

Coordinates: 46°29′49″N 84°21′17″W

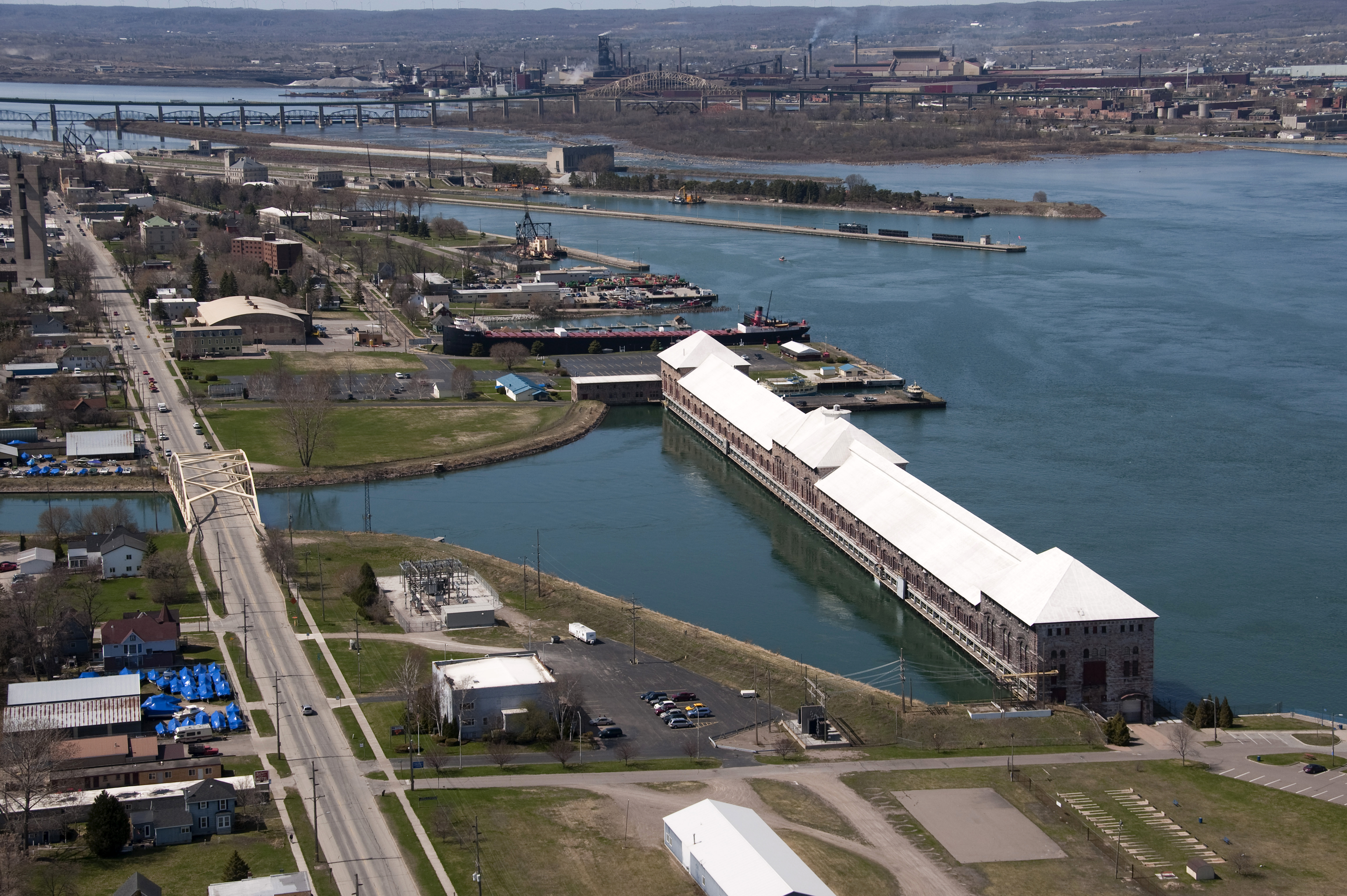
The Saint Marys Falls Hydropower Plant (foreground) at the mouth of the Edison Sault Power Canal. Soo Locks in the background and Power Canal to the left.

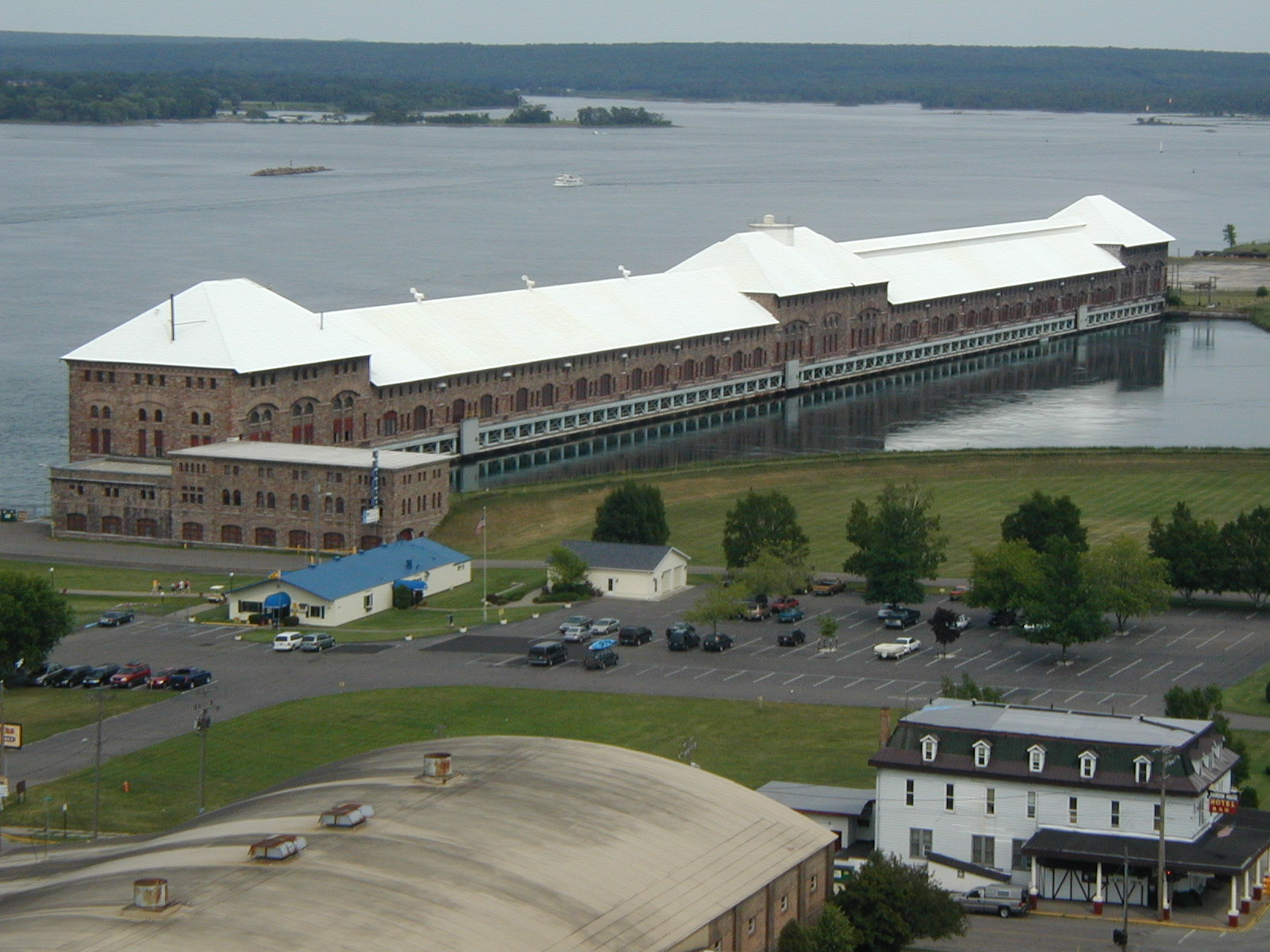
Another view of the power plant, with Power Canal to the right

The Edison Sault Power Canal supplies the Saint Marys Falls Hydropower Plant, a Cloverland Electric Cooperative hydroelectric plant, in Sault Ste. Marie, Michigan. Excavation of the power canal began in September 1898 and was completed in June 1902. The canal and hydroelectric complex were named a Historic Civil Engineering Landmark in 1983.

== Physical features ==
The length of the canal from the headgates (intake) to the power house is approximately 11,850 ft (3,610 m). The canal varies in width from 200 to 220 ft (61 to 67 m) at water level and is approximately 24 ft (7.3 m) in depth. The water velocity varies for various reasons but, at times, it can be up to 7 mph (11 km/h). The entrance to the canal is located at the eastern end of Ashmun Bay and is controlled by four steel headgates. The upper quarter of the canal was excavated from rock while the remainder was dug into the earth and given a timber lining. The canal is designed to carry 30,000 cu ft (850 m^{3}) of water per second.
