= Saint Marys Falls Hydropower Plant =

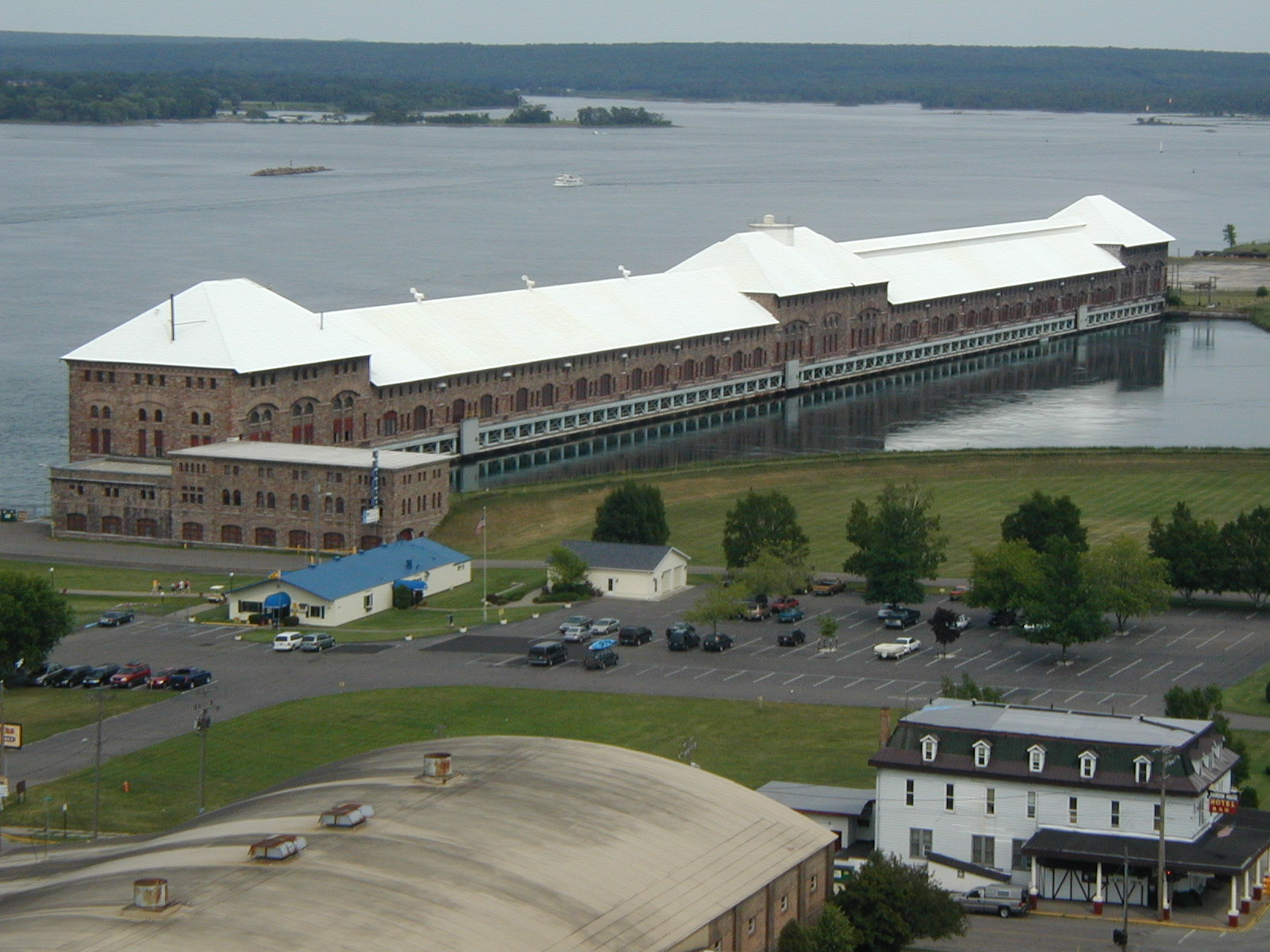
- The Saint Marys Falls Hydropower Plant (1902), a Historic Civil Engineering Landmark.
- Interactive map of Saint Marys Falls Hydropower Plant
- Country: United States
- Location: Sault Ste. Marie, Michigan
- Coordinates: 46.49743°N 84.33213°W
- Construction began: 1898
- Opening date: 1902

Power Station
- Type: Run-of-the-river
- Installed capacity: 18 MW

The Saint Marys Falls Hydropower Plant (also known as the Edison Sault Power Plant, Michigan Lake Superior Hydroelectric Power Plant, and the Cloverland Electric Cooperative Power House) is an 18-MW hydroelectric generating plant located in Sault Ste. Marie, Michigan (the "Soo"). It extracts water from the St. Marys River under the supervision of the Army Corps of Engineers, and the power is taken up and distributed by the Cloverland Electric Cooperative, a rural utility that serves the Soo area.

== History ==
As of 2024, the Soo hydropower plant is one of the oldest large generating stations still operating in the United States. The power canal and generator complex were begun in September 1898 and completed in June 1902, using engineering work from the first iteration of large-scale electrical generation in the late 1800s. It was from this work that the plant and utility that grew up around it acquired their historic name of Edison Sault, although Thomas Edison did not himself build the plant.

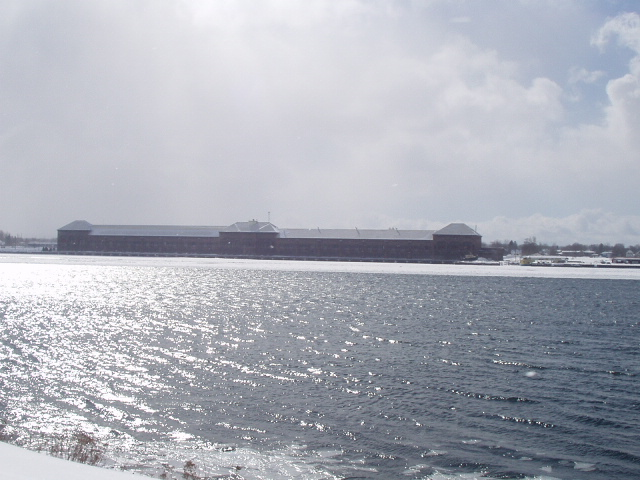
From the Canadian shore in winter.

The Soo hydropower plant was built to contain 74 generators under a single roof. This was done under the constraints of the Classical style, by building an industrial structure of 1,340 feet (410 m) in length parallel to the St. Marys River and facing the structure with masonry. The sandstone facing of the power station was chiseled out of blocks pulled from the Edison Sault Power Canal, the feeder canal that chutes water to the plant. President William Howard Taft visited the plant in 1911. The power canal and hydroelectric plant were together named a Historic Civil Engineering Landmark in 1983.

Although the hydroelectric plant could generate as much as 25-30 megawatts if operating at full capacity, grid planners rate it at 18 MW.

== Climate ==
Climate data for Sault Ste. Marie, Michigan, 1991–2020 normals: 630ft (192m)
Month	Jan	Feb	Mar	Apr	May	Jun	Jul	Aug	Sep	Oct	Nov	Dec	Year
Record high °F (°C)	47 (8)	50 (10)	82 (28)	85 (29)	91 (33)	93 (34)	97 (36)	97 (36)	91 (33)	82 (28)	76 (24)	61 (16)	97 (36)
Mean maximum °F (°C)	39.9 (4.4)	41.7 (5.4)	53.0 (11.7)	70.0 (21.1)	82.6 (28.1)	87.1 (30.6)	89.2 (31.8)	88.3 (31.3)	84.4 (29.1)	72.5 (22.5)	58.7 (14.8)	45.3 (7.4)	90.9 (32.7)
Mean daily maximum °F (°C)	22.5 (−5.3)	25.0 (−3.9)	34.5 (1.4)	47.3 (8.5)	61.9 (16.6)	71.9 (22.2)	76.3 (24.6)	75.4 (24.1)	67.7 (19.8)	53.4 (11.9)	40.1 (4.5)	29.2 (−1.6)	50.4 (10.2)
Daily mean °F (°C)	13.1 (−10.5)	14.4 (−9.8)	23.7 (−4.6)	37.3 (2.9)	50.6 (10.3)	60.2 (15.7)	65.2 (18.4)	64.5 (18.1)	57.2 (14.0)	44.8 (7.1)	33.3 (0.7)	22.0 (−5.6)	40.5 (4.7)
Mean daily minimum °F (°C)	3.7 (−15.7)	3.8 (−15.7)	12.9 (−10.6)	27.2 (−2.7)	39.3 (4.1)	48.6 (9.2)	54.1 (12.3)	53.5 (11.9)	46.7 (8.2)	36.3 (2.4)	26.5 (−3.1)	14.7 (−9.6)	30.6 (−0.8)
Mean minimum °F (°C)	−18.1 (−27.8)	−15.8 (−26.6)	−10.8 (−23.8)	13.7 (−10.2)	26.8 (−2.9)	34.7 (1.5)	43.5 (6.4)	43.2 (6.2)	34.5 (1.4)	24.9 (−3.9)	10.0 (−12.2)	−7.1 (−21.7)	−21.1 (−29.5)
Record low °F (°C)	−29 (−34)	−31 (−35)	−31 (−35)	−5 (−21)	23 (−5)	30 (−1)	37 (3)	38 (3)	31 (−1)	20 (−7)	−9 (−23)	−23 (−31)	−31 (−35)
Average precipitation inches (mm)	2.45 (62)	1.71 (43)	1.93 (49)	2.74 (70)	2.63 (67)	3.05 (77)	3.15 (80)	3.12 (79)	3.82 (97)	4.57 (116)	3.65 (93)	2.97 (75)	35.79 (908)
Average snowfall inches (cm)	28.60 (72.6)	24.00 (61.0)	13.50 (34.3)	7.60 (19.3)	0.50 (1.3)	0.00 (0.00)	0.00 (0.00)	0.00 (0.00)	0.00 (0.00)	1.20 (3.0)	14.30 (36.3)	27.70 (70.4)	117.4 (298.2)
Source 1: NOAA
Source 2: XMACIS (records & monthly max/mins)
