= Cloverland Electric Cooperative =

Cloverland Electric Cooperative is an electric cooperative in Michigan, United States. It serves five counties on the eastern end of Michigan's Upper Peninsula (Chippewa, Mackinac, Schoolcraft, Delta and Luce), as well as the cities of Sault Ste. Marie, Michigan and St. Ignace. Cloverland Electric Cooperative is based in Dafter, just south of Sault Ste, Marie.

== System Information ==
Cloverland Electric's transmission line voltage is 138,000 volts. Their subtransmission voltage is 69,000 volts. Distribution voltages are 14,400 volts and 13,200/7,620 volts. The cooperative has interconnections with Consumers Energy via two 138 kV cables submerged under the Straits of Mackinac and with Upper Peninsula Power Company and We Energies via 69 kV and 138 kV lines. The cooperative operates the venerable Saint Marys Falls Hydropower Plant (1902) as a partial supplier of power to their distribution system.

== See also ==
- Edison Sault Electric Company -- private utility acquired by Cloverland in 2009
