= Ashmun Bay =

- Location within Michigan
- Location: Chippewa County, Michigan
- Coordinates: 46.4961332°N 84.3794855°W
- Type: Bay
- Surface elevation: 607 feet (185 m)

Ashmun Bay is a small bay that is a part of the Upper St. Mary's River. It receives water from Ashmun Creek, which drains much of the interior Sault Ste. Marie. It is surrounded by the city of Sault Ste. Marie, Michigan, with a city access ramp for small boats on the north shore.
