= Upper Peninsula Power Company =

Electric power utility in Michigan

- Trade name: UPPCO
- Industry: Electric power industry
- Founded: 1947
- Headquarters: 1002 Harbor Hills Drive, Marquette, Michigan, United States
- Key people: Gradon Haehnel, CEO
- Number of employees: 169
- Website: www.uppco.com

The Upper Peninsula Power Company (UPPCO) is an electrical power utility provider headquartered in Marquette, Michigan, with service centers in Escanaba, Houghton, Iron River, Ishpeming, Munising and Ontonagon.

== History ==
The Upper Peninsula Power Company was formed in 1947 as a result of the merging of three electric utility providers: the Houghton County Electric Light Company, the Copper District Power Company, and Iron Range Light and Power.

UPPCO joined a coalition led by Wisconsin Public Service Corporation (WPS) in 1961 to create a coordination of electrical service providers in Upper Michigan and Wisconsin. Through this agreement, the Wisconsin-Upper Michigan System (WUMS) was created with the ultimate goal of increasing the electrical grid resiliency by coordinating operational tasks such as equipment maintenance and construction of infrastructure facilities.

In 1994, Wisconsin Public Service Corporation (WPS) formed the WPS Resources Corporation which became the holding company most partnered electric utility providers (excluding UPPCO) operated under at the time. UPPCO was eventually acquired by the holding company in 1998.

In 2007, UPPCO negotiated a separation from Integrys Energy Group (the new holding company resulting from a merger between WPS Resources Corporation and Peoples Energy Corp.). The separation was effectively completed in 2017 and UPPCO resumed operation as an independent electric utility provider.

== Service area ==
The UPPCO service area includes 10 counties in the central and western portion of Michigan's Upper Peninsula including: Alger, Delta, Marquette, Menominee, Schoolcraft, Baraga, Houghton, Iron, Ontonagon, and Keweenaw. The company serves approximately 52,000 customers which equates to approximately 12 customers per square mile.

== Power generation ==
UPPCO generates approximately 20% of the electrical power distributed to its customers. Additional power is purchased from Consumers Energy in lower Michigan and the Wisconsin Energy Corporation (WE Energies). UPPCO operates multiple electrical power generation plants primarily including hydroelectric dams. Operational facilities include:

- Victoria Dam in Rockland, Michigan - 12.2 Megawatts
- Boney Falls Dam in Cornell, Michigan - 4.1 Megawatts
- Prickett Hydroelectric Dam in Baraga, Michigan - 2 Megawatts
- Hoist Hydroelectric Dam in Negaunee, Michigan - 3.4 Megawatts
- Escanaba 1 Hydroelectric Dam in Escanaba, Michigan - 1.6 Megawatts
- Escanaba 3 Hydroelectric Dam in Escanaba, Michigan - 3 Megawatt

== Power transmission and distribution ==
UPCCO operates all transmission lines at 138,000 volts and has transmission interconnections with Wisconsin Public Service Corporation as well as Wisconsin Energies and the Cloverland Electric Cooperative.

UPPCO operates sub-transmission systems at 69,000 volts and has sub-transmission interconnections with the Marquette Board of Light and Power, Alger-Delta Electric Cooperative, and Cloverland Electric Cooperative.

UPPCO operates its distribution network at 12,470/7,200 volts. The company's distribution network includes approximately 3,300 miles of both single and three phase power circuits served by 58 distribution substations.
