= National Hydrography Dataset =

Digital database of water features of the United States

The National Hydrography Dataset (NHD) is a digital database of surface water features used to make maps. It contains features such as lakes, ponds, streams, rivers, canals, dams, and stream gauges for the United States. As of October 1st, 2023, the NHD has been replaced by the 3D Hydrography Program

== Description ==
Cartographers can link to or download the NHD to use in their computer mapping software. The NHD is used to represent surface water on maps and is also used to perform geospatial analysis. It is a digital vector geospatial dataset designed for use in geographic information systems (GIS) to analyze the flow of water throughout the nation. The dataset represents over 7.5-million miles of streams/rivers and 6.5-million lake/ponds.

== Mapping ==
In mapping, the NHD is used with other data themes such as elevation, boundaries, and transportation to produce general reference maps. In geospatial analysis the NHD is used by scientists using GIS technology. This takes advantage of a flow direction network that can be processed to trace the flow of water downstream. A rich set of attributes used to identify the water features includes an identifier, the official name of the feature, the length or area of the feature, and metadata describing the source of the data. The identifier is used in an addressing system to link specific information about the water such as water discharge, water quality, and fish population. Using the basic water features, flow network, linked information, and other characteristics, it is possible to study cause and effect relationships, such as how a source of poor water quality upstream might affect a fish population downstream.

The NHD is part of the United States Geological Survey The National Map for the United States. The NHD is also linked with similar datasets representing the surface water for Canada and Mexico. The dataset primarily maps features a 1:24,000-scale, but in certain areas provides detail at 1:5,000-scale. A version of the NHD called the NHDPlus is integrated with elevation and other landscape data to create detailed drainage catchments and flow volume and velocity estimates for streams and rivers of the U.S. at 1:100,000-scale. This data is available from the United States Environmental Protection Agency.

== Reading ==
Simley, J.D., Carswell Jr., W.J., 2009, The National Map—Hydrography: U.S. Geological Survey Fact Sheet 2009-3054, 4 p.
