= St. Marys River (Michigan–Ontario) =

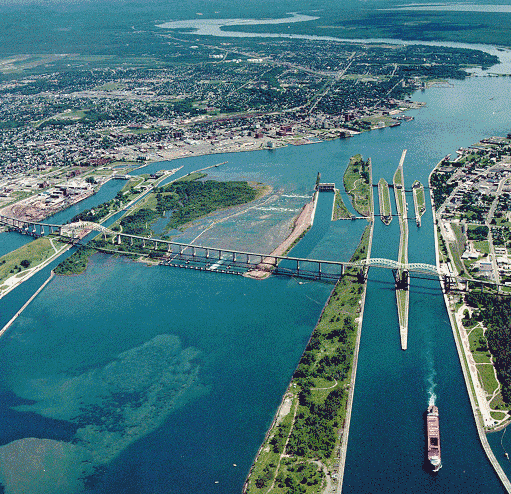
- The Sault Ste. Marie International Bridge crossing the river at the Canada–United States border

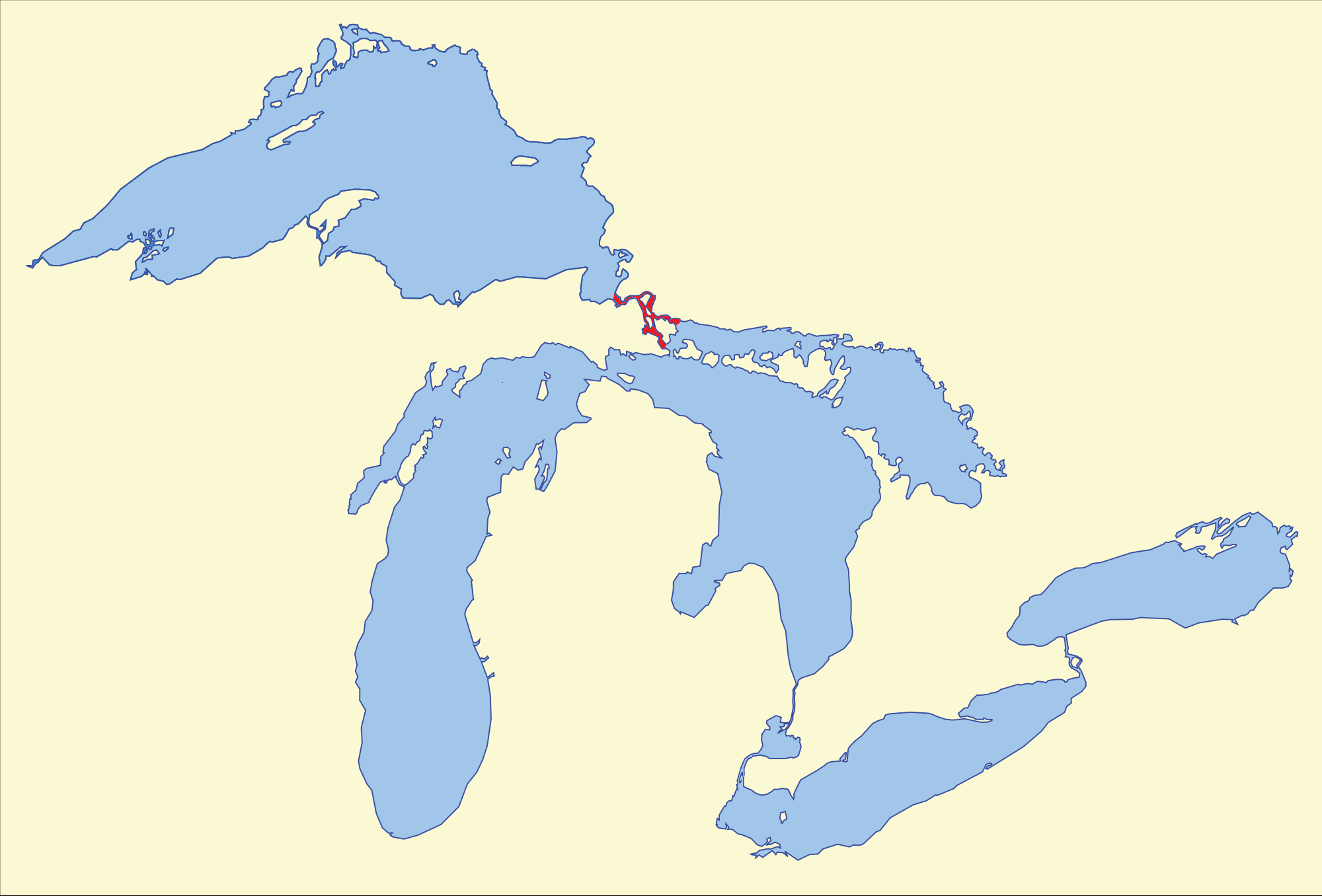
- Location of the St. Marys River connecting Lake Superior and Lake Huron in the Great Lakes system

Location
- Countries: Canada; United States
- Province/State: Ontario; Michigan
- Cities: Canada: Bruce Mines; Echo Bay; Hilton Beach; Jocelyn; MacLennan; St. Joseph; Sault Ste. Marie; United States: Bay Mills; De Tour; Sault Ste. Marie; Soo; Sugar Island

Physical characteristics
- Source: Whitefish Bay (Lake Superior)
  - coordinates: 46°30′02″N 84°36′14″W
  - elevation: 600 ft (180 m)
- Mouth: North Channel (Lake Huron)
  - coordinates: 46°03′20″N 83°54′34″W
  - elevation: 577 ft (176 m)
- Length: 74.5 mi (119.9 km)
- Discharge
  - average: 2,135 m^{3}/s (75,400 cu ft/s)

The St. Marys River, sometimes written St. Mary's River, drains Lake Superior, starting at the end of Whitefish Bay and flowing 74.5 miles (119.9 km) southeast into Lake Huron, with a fall of 23 feet (7.0 m). For its entire length, it is an international border, separating Michigan in the United States from Ontario, Canada.

The twin cities of Sault Ste. Marie, Ontario, and Sault Ste. Marie, Michigan, are connected across the St. Marys River by the Sault Ste. Marie International Bridge. The St. Marys Rapids are just below the river's exit from Lake Superior and can be bypassed by huge freight ships through the man-made Soo Locks and the Sault Ste. Marie Canal.

Two of the Ontario tributaries of this river are the Garden River and the Bar River. Other Canadian tributaries include Fort Creek, the Root River, the Little Carp River, the Big Carp River, the Lower Echo River, Desbarats River, and the Two Tree River. The US tributaries to the St. Marys River are the Gogomain River, the Munuscong River, the Little Munuscong River, the Charlotte River, and the Waiska River.

== History ==
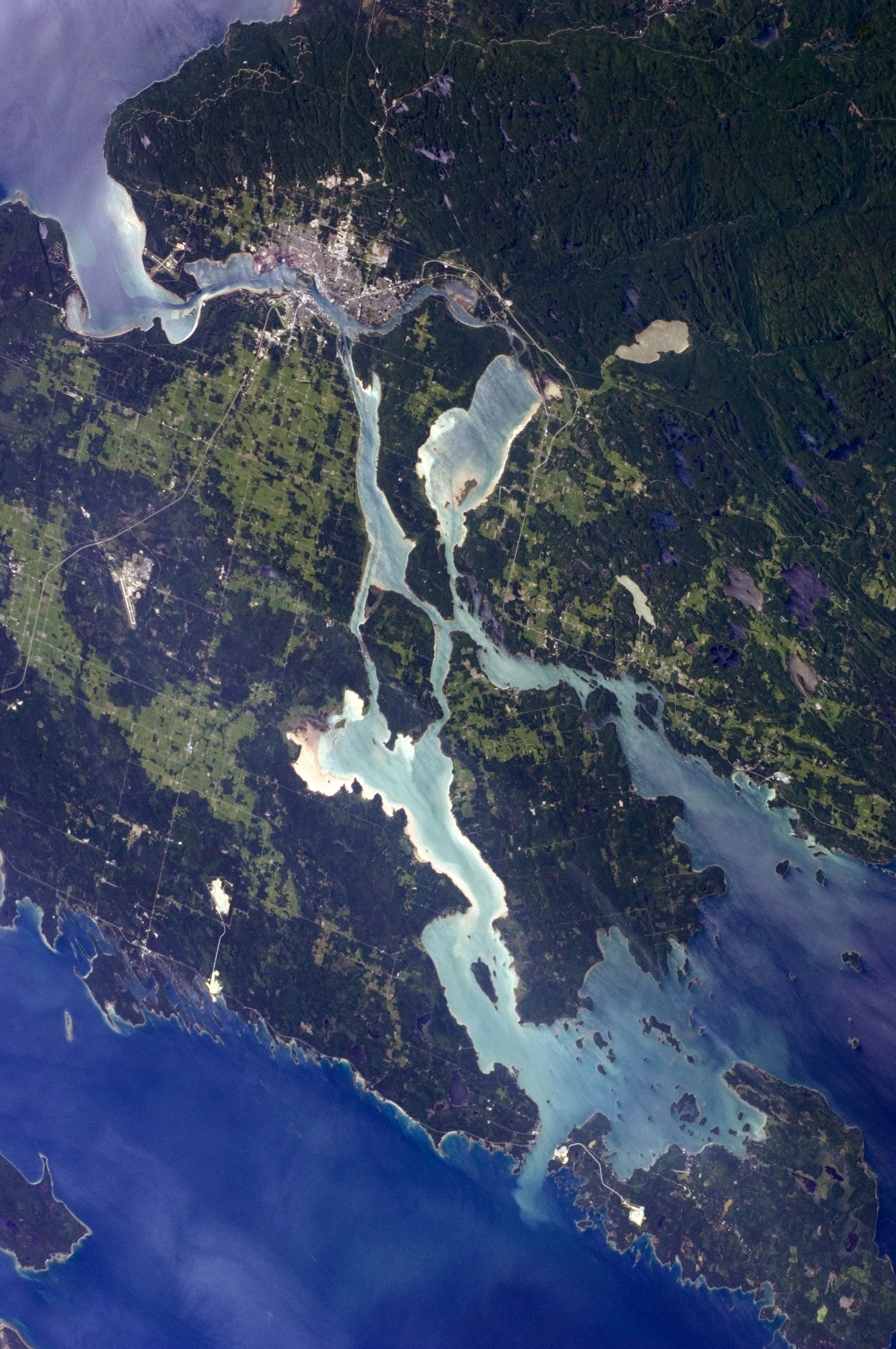
St. Marys River connects Lake Superior (top left) to Lake Huron (bottom and right)

Before Europeans arrived, Ojibwe (Chippewa) Indigenous Americans fished, traded, and maintained a portage around the rapids of the St. Marys River, which they referred to as Baawitigong, meaning "at the cascading rapids". French explorer Étienne Brûlé was the first European to travel up the rapids in about 1621. In 1641, Jesuit priests Isaac Jogues and Charles Raymbault ventured the same route as Brûlé, finding many Ojibwe at the rapids, and named it Sault Ste. Marie. Sault (Middle and early Modern French spelling of saut) means "jump"; hence, the secondary meaning "rapids" because the water 'jumps.'

Fort St. Joseph was built on the Canadian shore in 1796 to protect a trading post, and ensure continued British control of the area. The fort fulfilled its role in the War of 1812.

The first modern lock was completed in May 1855 by Erastus Corning's St. Mary's Falls Ship Canal Company, and was known as the "American Lock". Today, there are four parallel locks on the American side of the river, although only two are in regular use. The Soo Locks became part of the Great Lakes Waterway system in 1959.

Partially due to the American refusal of passage through the Soo Locks during the Wolseley Expedition, a Canadian Lock was built in 1895. The current Canadian Lock is used for recreational boats and is a National Historic Site of Canada.

During World War II, the Soo Locks and the St. Marys River waterway were heavily guarded by U.S. and Canadian forces coordinated by the U.S. Army's Central Defense Command. During the waterway's usable season from March through November, 90 percent of the United States' iron ore production for domestic use passed through it in 1939, making the waterway critical to maintaining war production. A battalion of infantry, stationed at nearby Fort Brady, provided security beginning just after the outbreak of the European war in September 1939; this was reduced to a company in mid-1940 and replaced by a military police battalion in May 1941. After Pearl Harbor in December 1941, fear of possible air or paratroop attacks by German forces led to a major expansion of defence measures. Scenarios envisioned included U-boats in Hudson Bay launching attack aircraft, and one-way bombing or paratroop missions along a great circle route from German-occupied Norway. Units deployed included the 131st Infantry Regiment, an anti-aircraft regiment, and a barrage balloon battalion for a total in mid-1942 of 7,000 troops in the area. Canada provided an anti-aircraft battalion, elements of the Royal Canadian Mounted Police, barracks and defensive positions for some of the U.S. force, and a warning system of 266 aircraft observation posts of the Aircraft Identity Corps extending northward to Hudson Bay. This was augmented by five U.S.-staffed radar stations in northern Ontario. By late 1943, with no threat emerging and spare components stockpiled in the event of lock damage, the U.S. forces were cut to 2,500 troops, and the AA and air warning defences were abandoned. In January 1944 the garrison was further reduced to a single military police battalion.

== Islands ==
- Drummond Island (Michigan)
- Neebish Island (Michigan)
- St. Joseph Island (Ontario)
- Squirrel Island (Ontario / Garden River First Nation)
- Sugar Island (Michigan)
- Whitefish Island (Ontario / Batchewana First Nation)
- Lime Island (Michigan)
- Cook Island (Michigan / Ontario)

== Works ==
=== Bridges ===
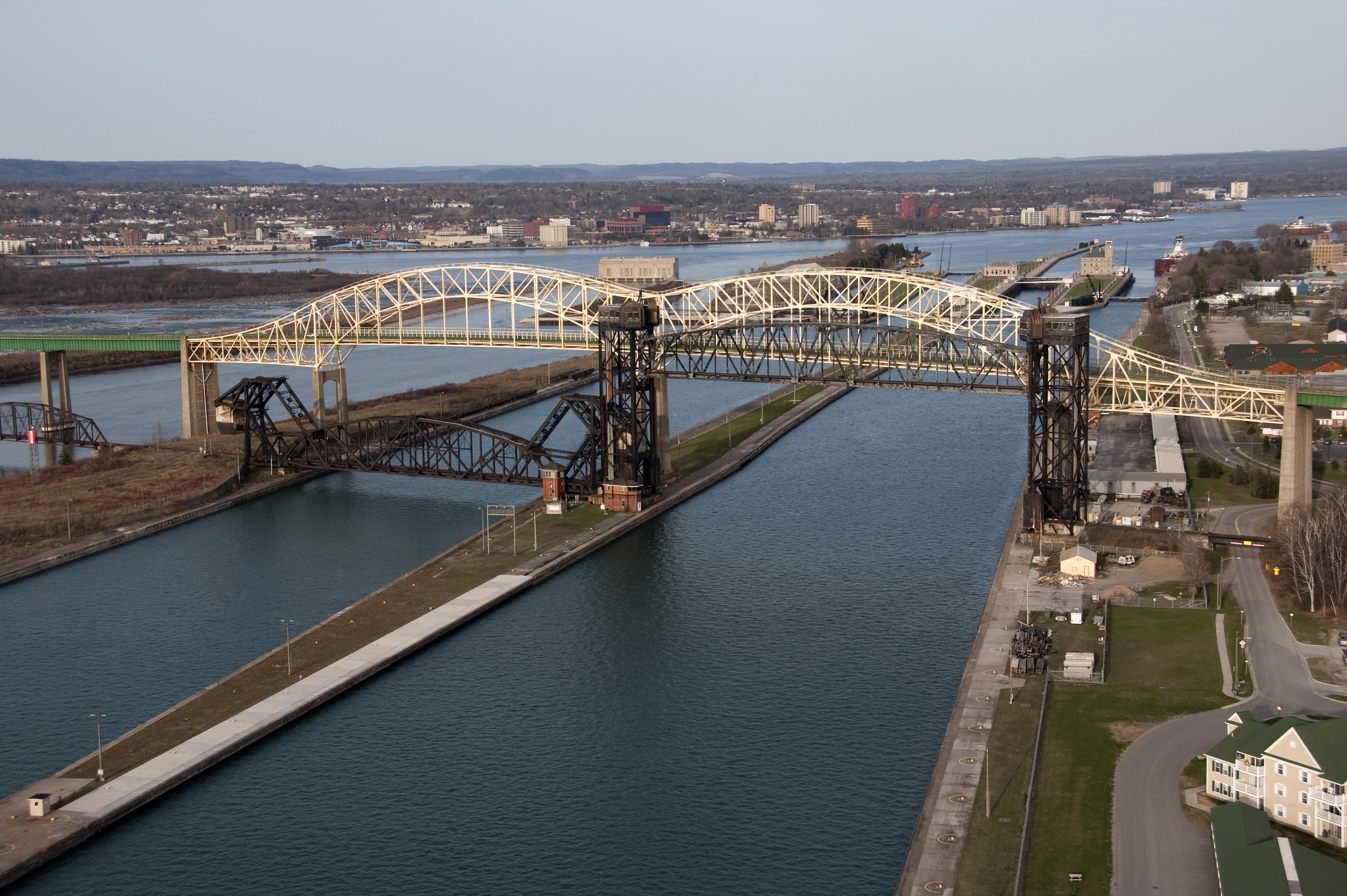
The International Bridge with the rail bridge crossing the American Locks.

The Sault Ste. Marie International Bridge, a steel truss arch bridge, takes road traffic across the river. Directly to the west is the Sault Ste. Marie International Railroad Bridge, which carries rail traffic on a single set of tracks.

=== Power plants ===
The Edison Sault Electric Hydroelectric Plant, located at the eastern end of the Sault Ste. Marie Power Canal which runs between Lake Superior and Lake Huron through the city south of the American locks, is one of the longest hydroelectric plants in the world at 1,340 feet (408 m) in length. The plant consists of 74 three-phase generators capable of generating 25 to 30 megawatts. It was completed in 1902. The hydro plant is faced with stone quarried during the excavation of the Sault Ste. Marie Power Canal.

The United States Army Corps of Engineers owns and operates a hydroelectric generating plant directly north of the American locks.

Finally, the Francis H. Clergue Generating Station, owned and operated by Brookfield Renewable Energy, Inc., is a hydroelectric generating plant located directly north of the Canadian lock with a generating capacity of 52 MW. It was completed in 1981.

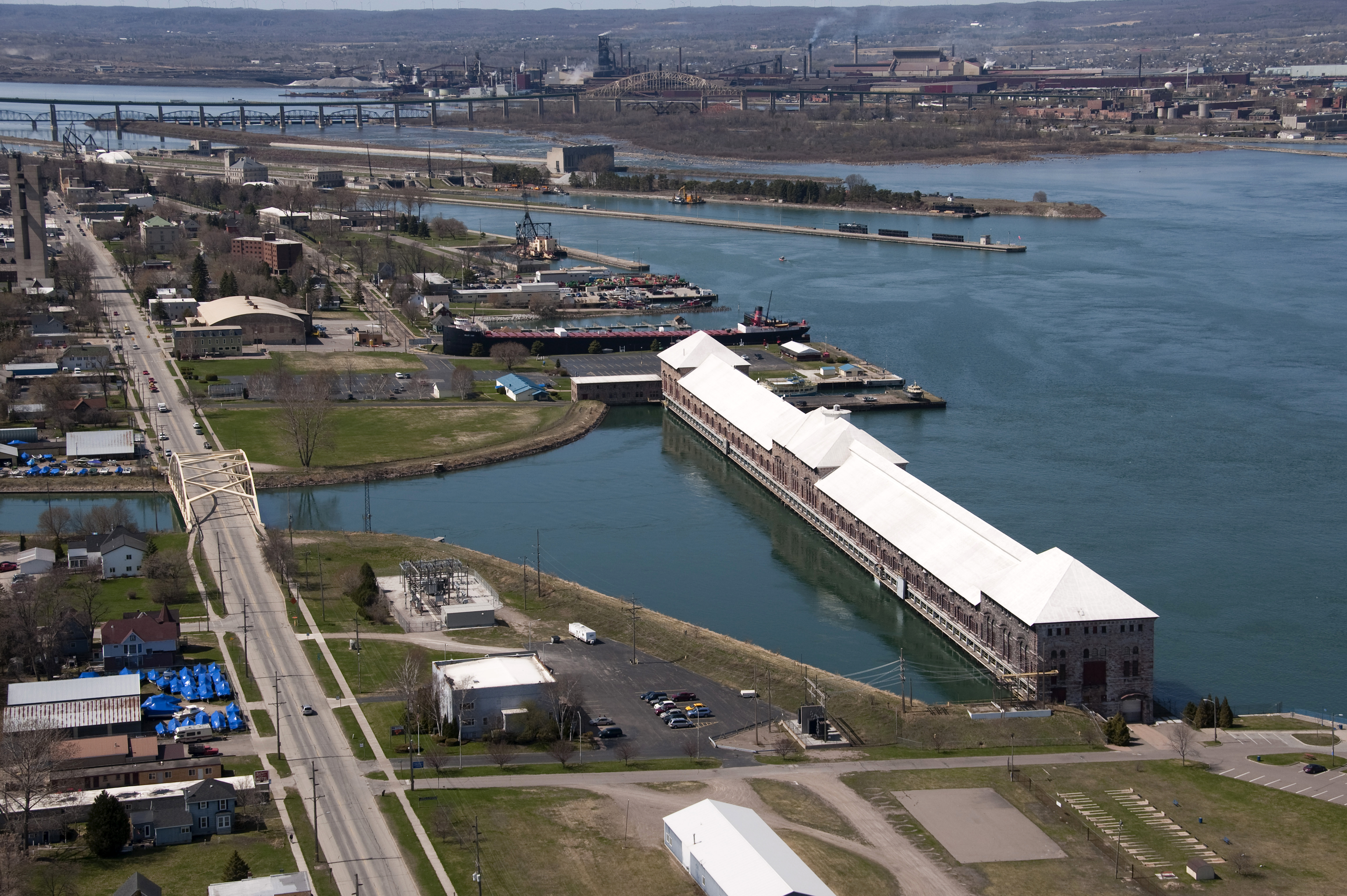
Saint Marys Falls Hydropower Plant at the mouth of the Edison Sault Power Canal

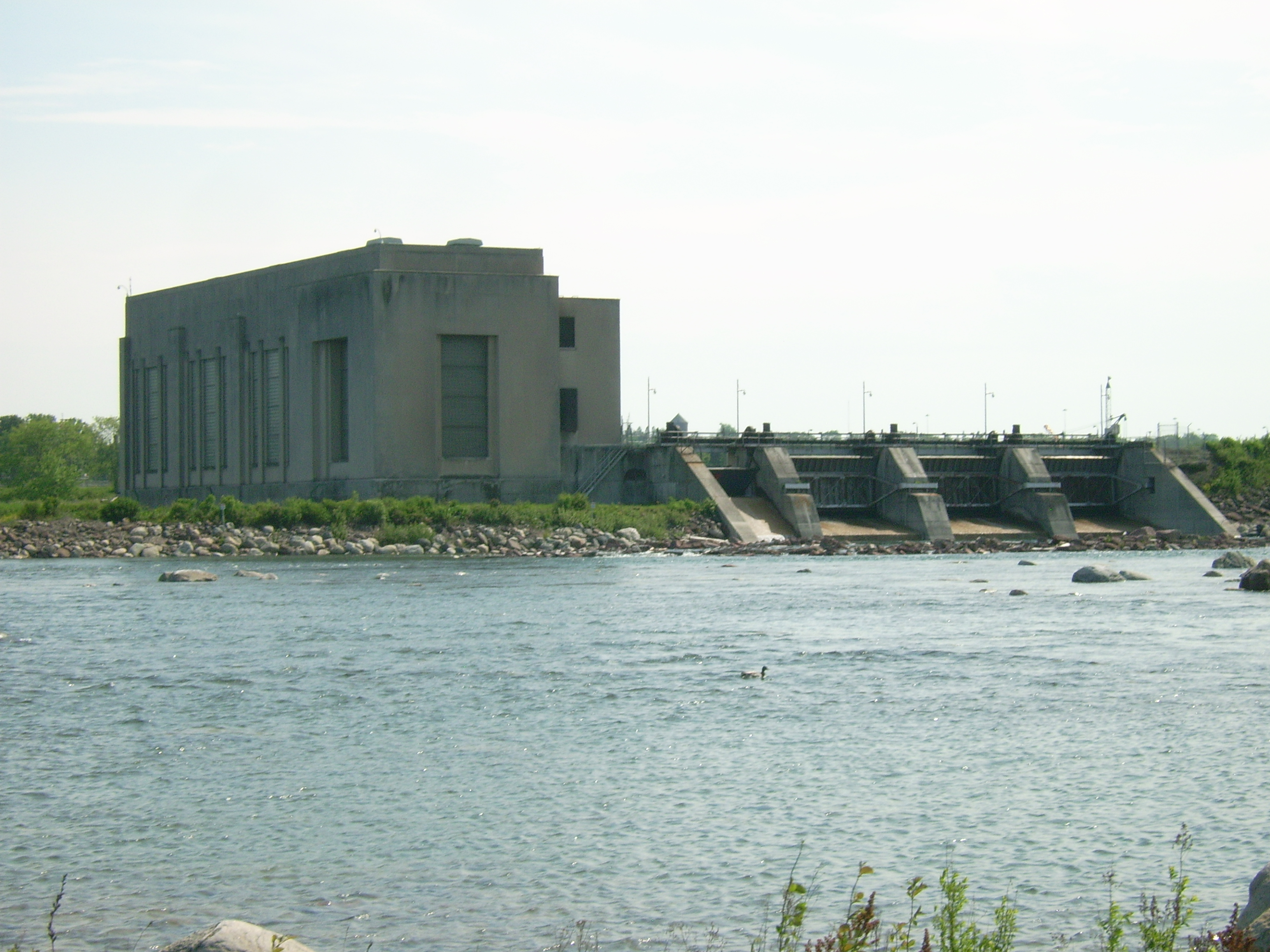
US Army Corps of Engineers hydroelectric plant seen from across the St. Marys Rapids

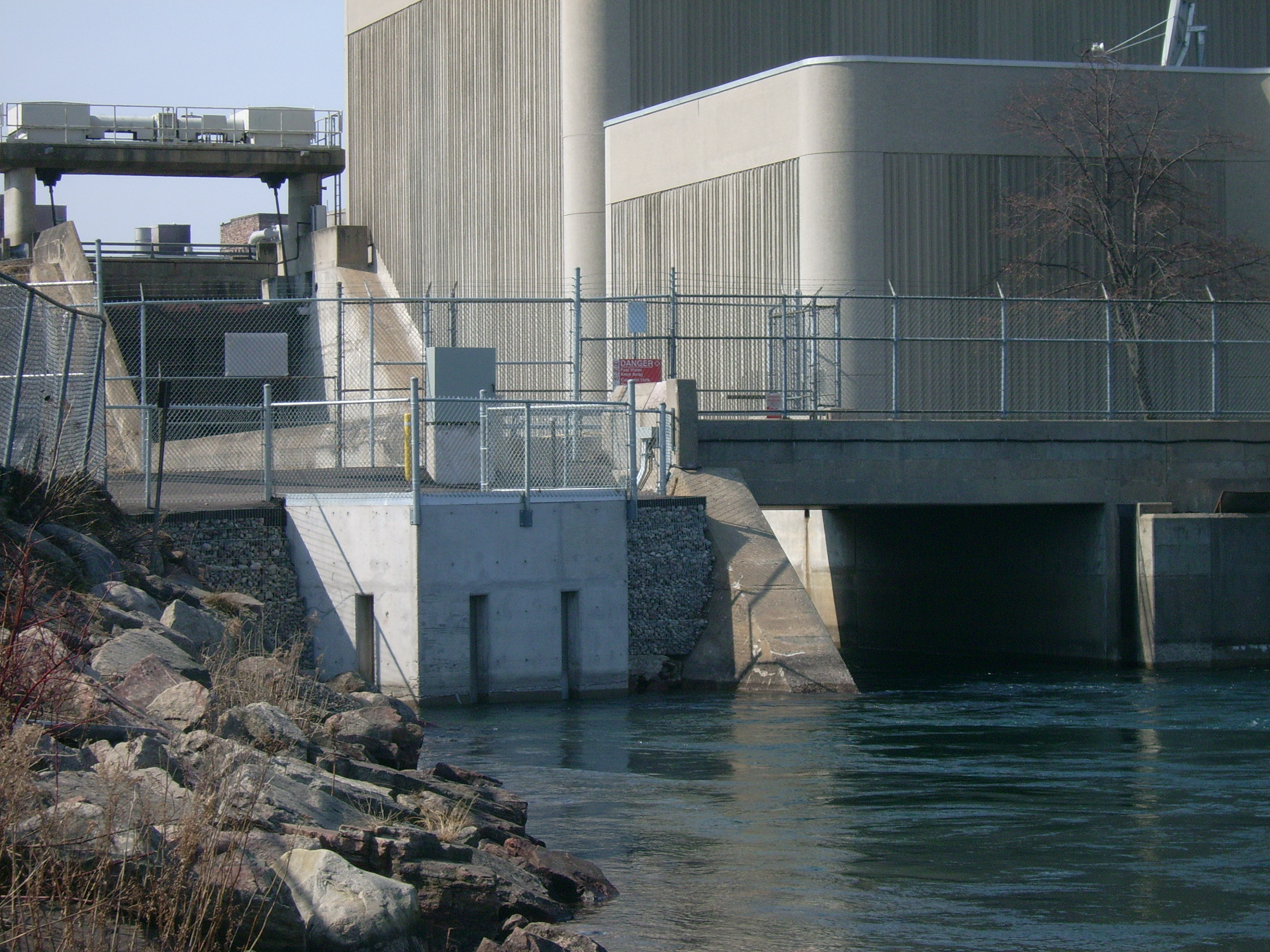
Francis H. Clergue Generating Station

=== Canal ===
The Edison Sault Power Canal is used to power the Saint Marys Falls Hydropower Plant at its eastern end. The canal separated downtown Sault Ste. Marie, Michigan, from its mainland, making it an island. It was begun in September 1898 as the Michigan Lake Superior Power Company Canal, but completed by Edison Sault Electric Company in June 1902. Measured from its headgates to its end at the power plant, it is 2.25 miles (3.62 km) in length, between 200 and 220 feet (61 and 67 m) wide, and 24 feet (7.3 m) deep. The water runs down the canal at speeds upwards of 7 miles per hour (11 km/h).

=== Locks ===
The American Soo Locks are the major transportation route around the St. Marys Rapids, but the Canadian Sault Ste. Marie Canal is still used by recreational and tour boats on account of its smaller size, simpler procedures, and additional mooring lines to support small craft. By agreement, traffic may use either country's locks without passports.

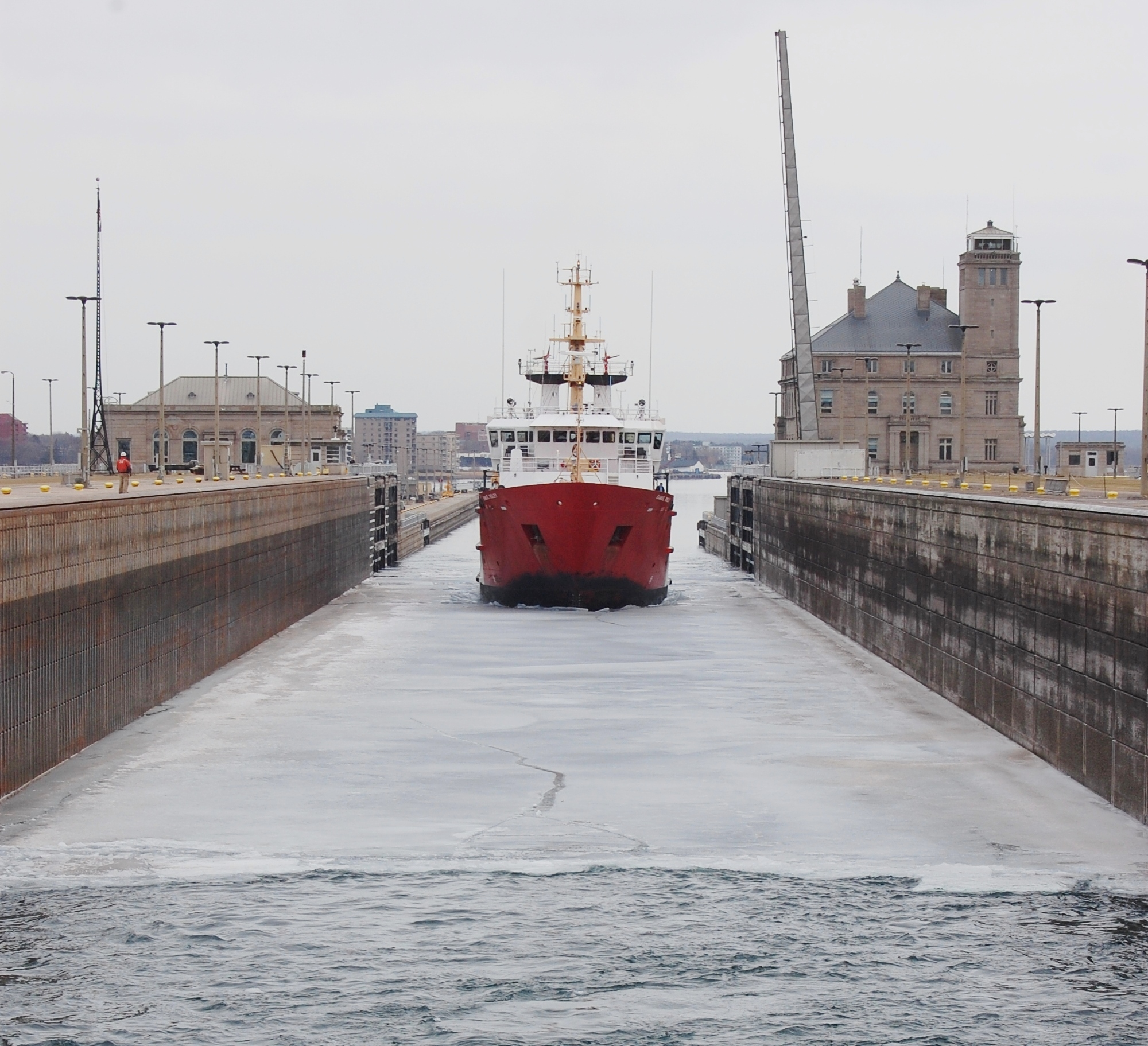
CCGS Samuel Risley starts the shipping season by breaking the ice in the Poe Lock

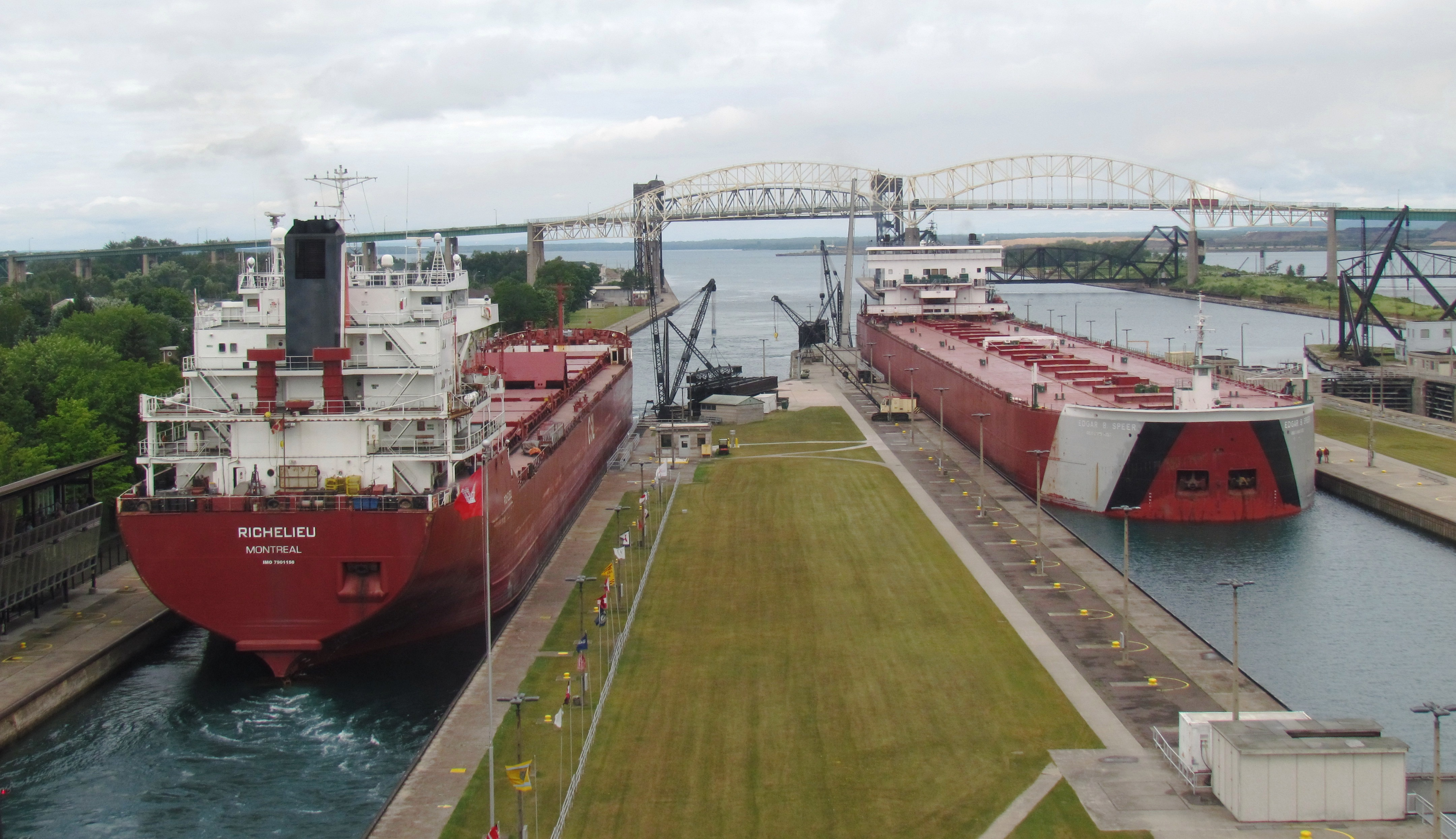
The Edgar B. Speer heading downstream and the Richelieu heading upstream in the Soo Locks

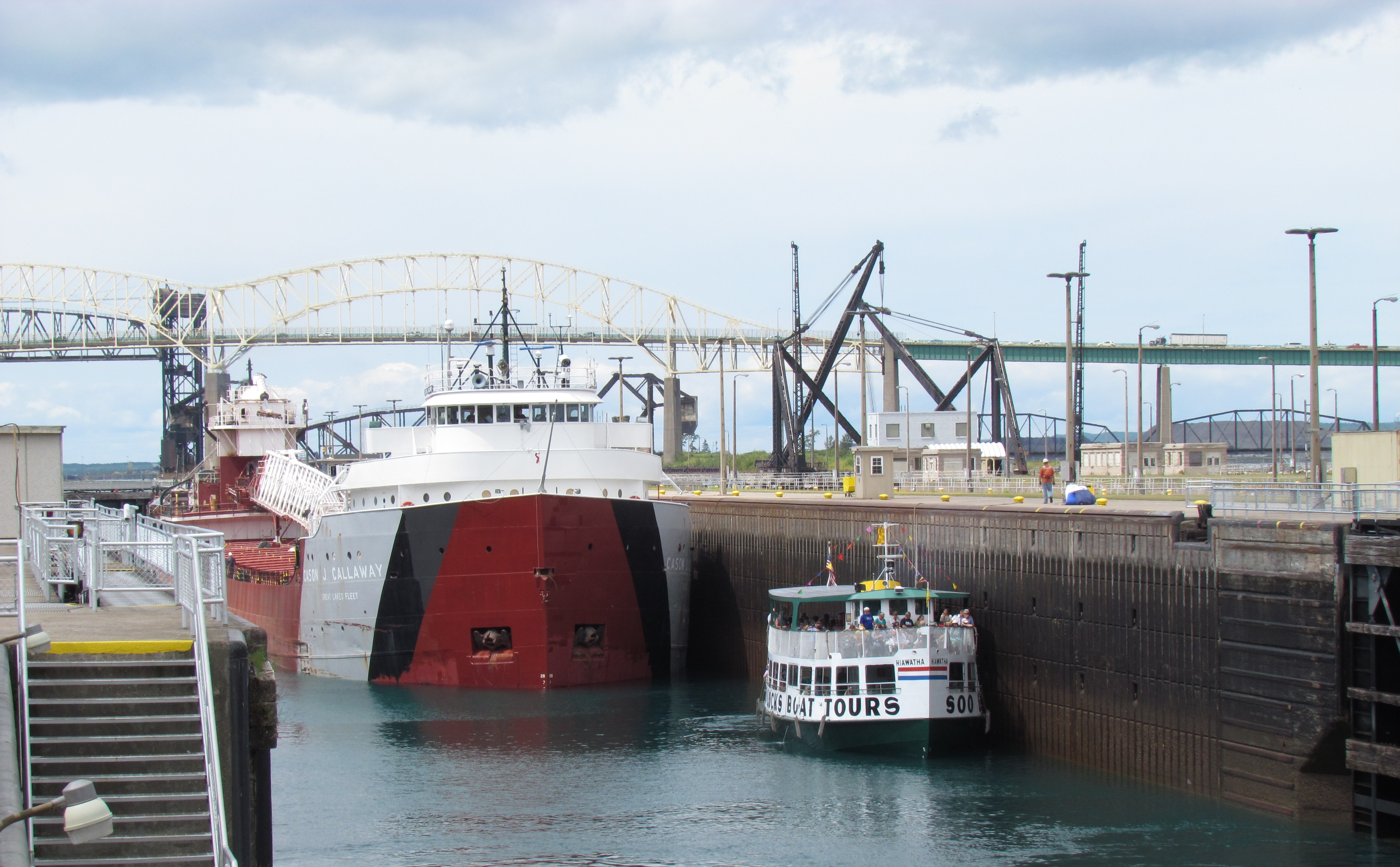
The tour boat Hiawatha and the laker Cason J. Callaway share the Poe Lock

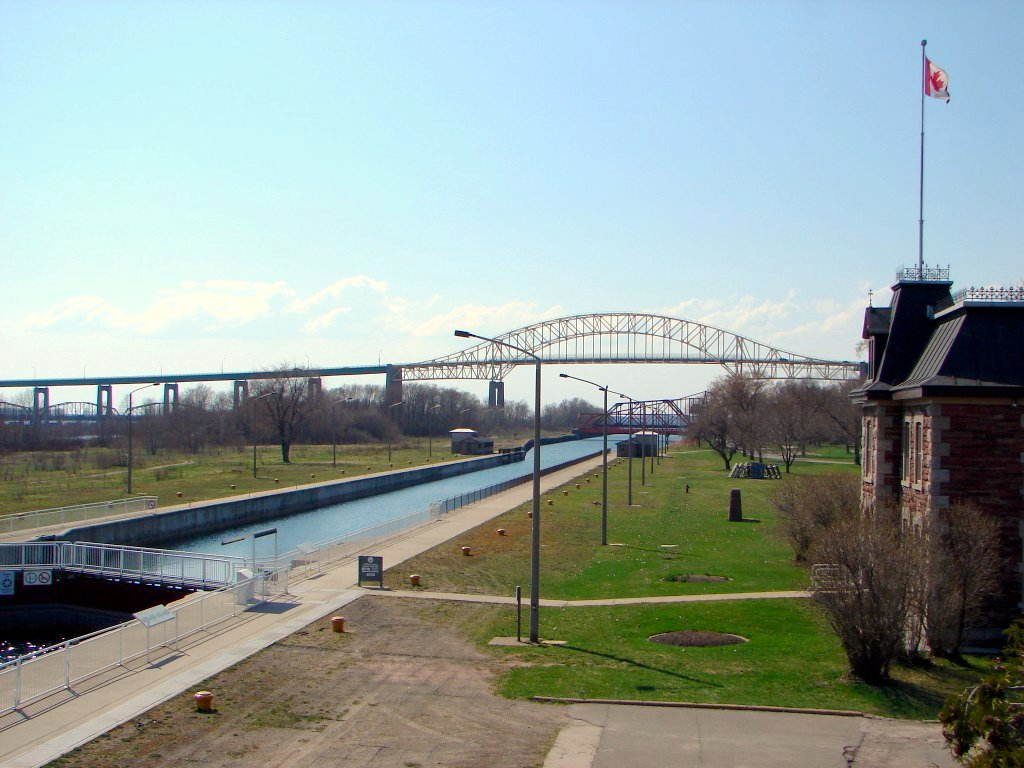
View of the Sault Ste. Marie Canal

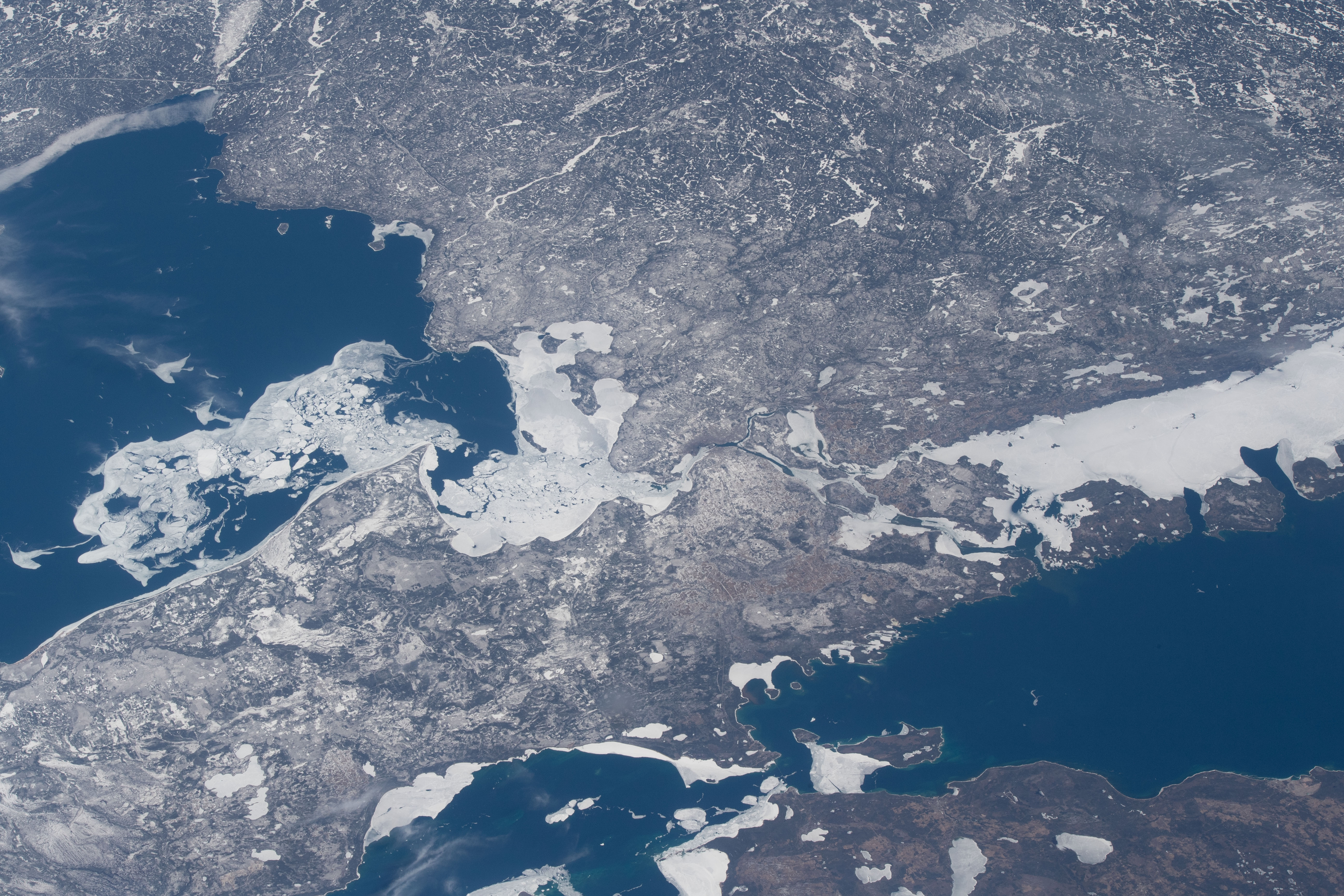
Ice blocks ships starting in the winter, so the months without ship traffic are an opportunity to do maintenance. This photo was taken on April 10, 2022 from the International Space Station.

=== Other works ===
A set of compensating works are located at the mouth of the rapids, which are used to control the outflow of water from Lake Superior. Completed between 1901 and 1921, the works were built to provide greater supply of the rivers flow through the three hydroelectric plants and locks on the river. This flow is controlled by the International Joint Commission. The works consists of 16 sluice gates, half of which are on the American side, and the other half on the Canadian side of the river. On average, upwards of 93% of the river's flow is diverted by the compensating works to power generation and navigational uses.

Because all of the other gates are periodically closed, totally dewatering the rapids, a concrete berm was constructed in 1985 along the north side of the rapids south of Whitefish Island as remedial works to protect fish spawning habitat from lower outflow through the rapids due to the operation of the compensation works. The berm begins at Gate #1 of the compensating works so as to retain the ability to provide a dedicated flow over the fish spawning habitat, independent of water supply over the rest of the rapids.

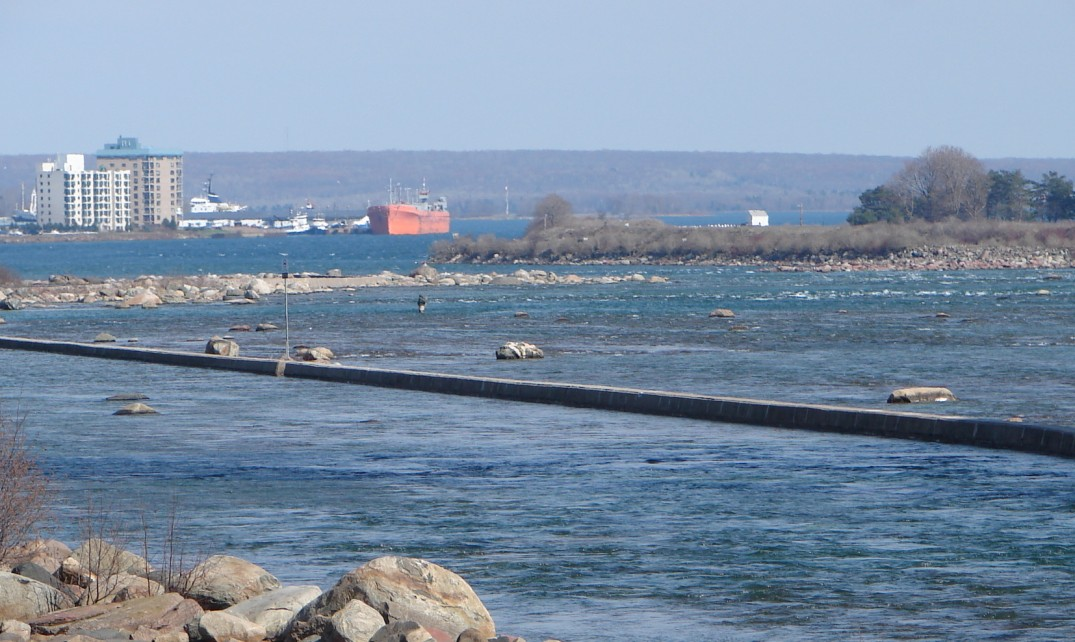
Remedial concrete berm along the St. Marys Rapids, an effort to improve fish spawning habitat

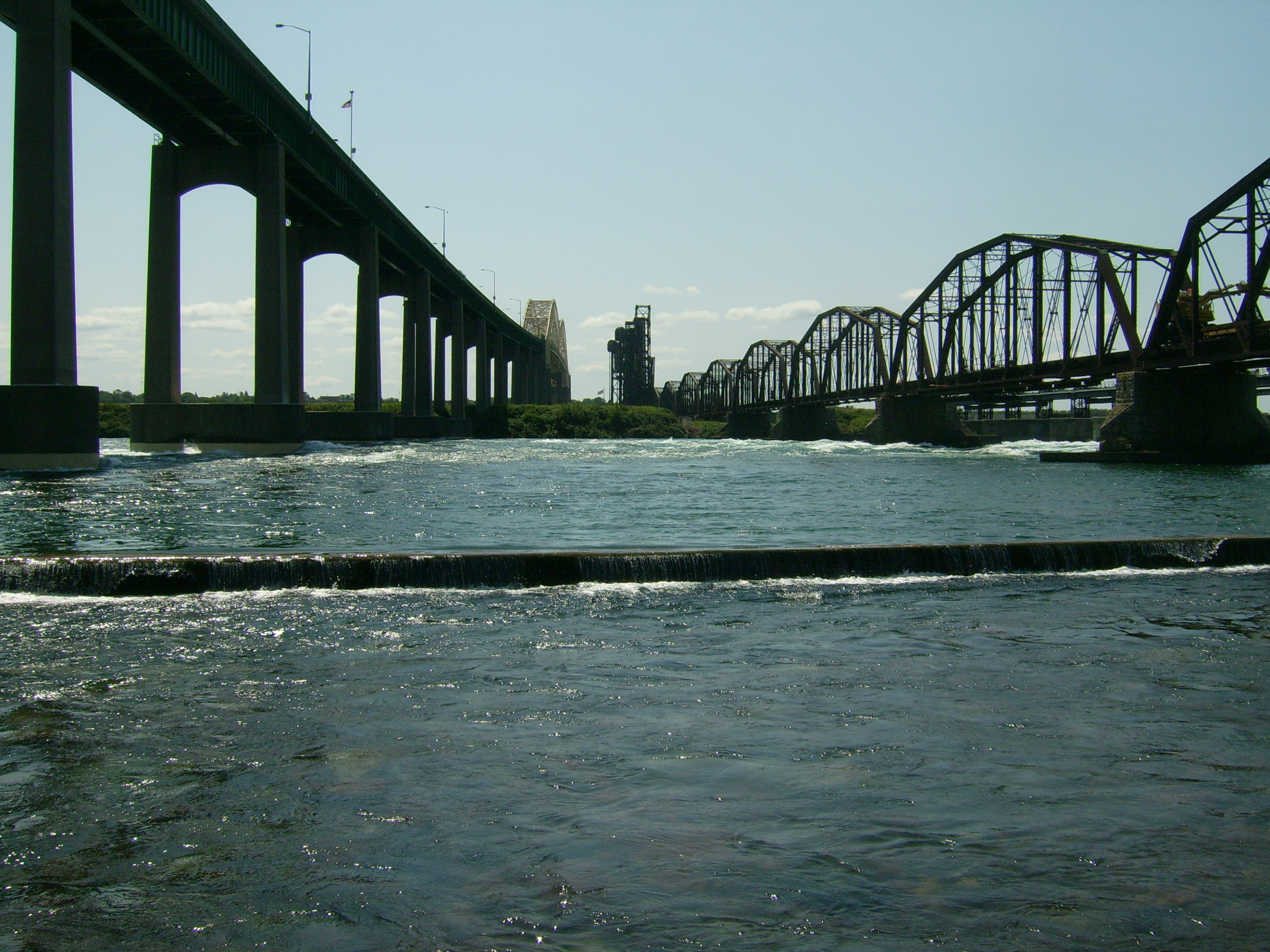
International Bridge (left) and rail bridge (right) with the remedial berm in the foreground

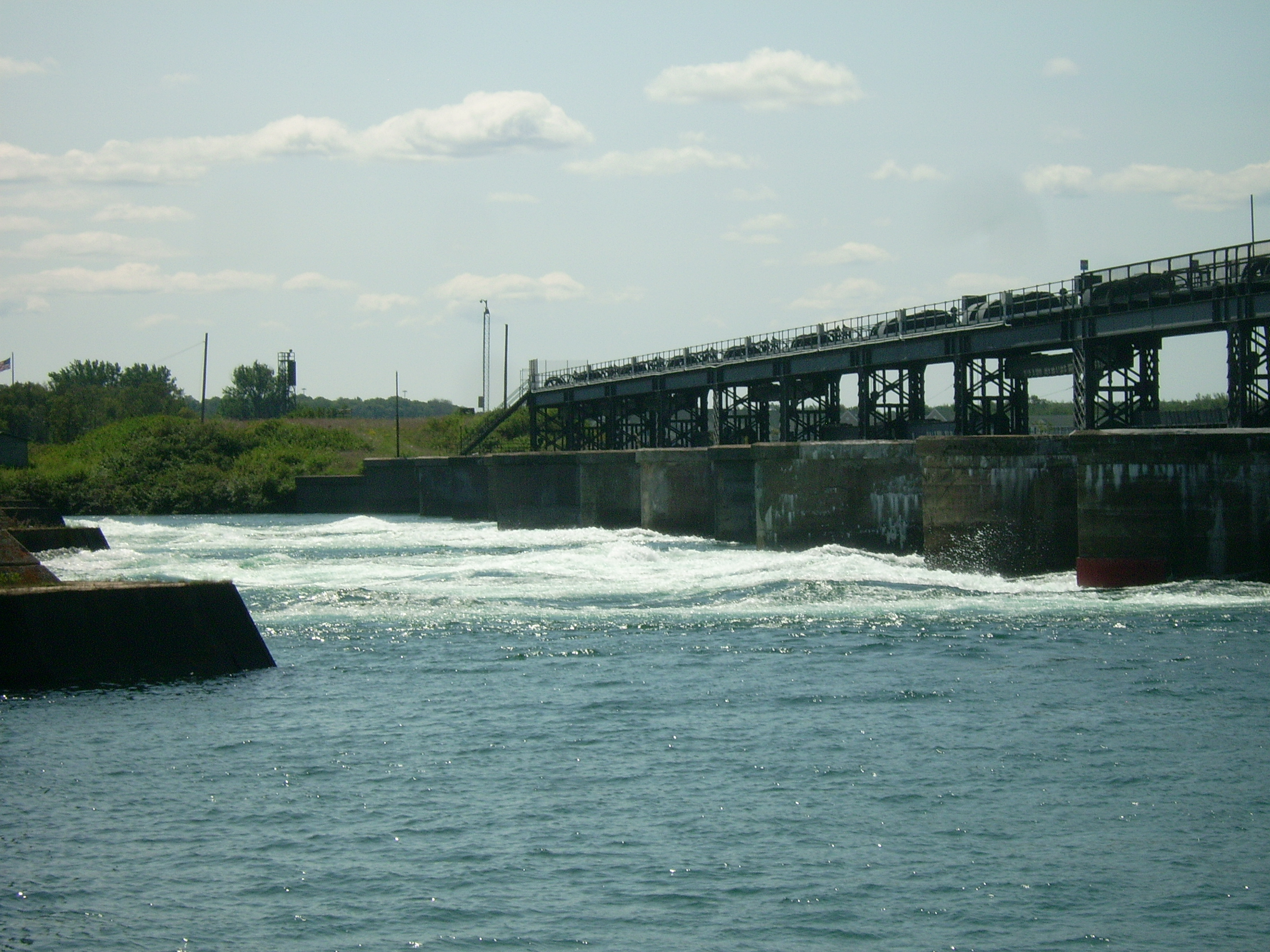
Lake Superior compensating works with a high rate of water flow (equivalent of 6 gates fully open)

== Pollution ==
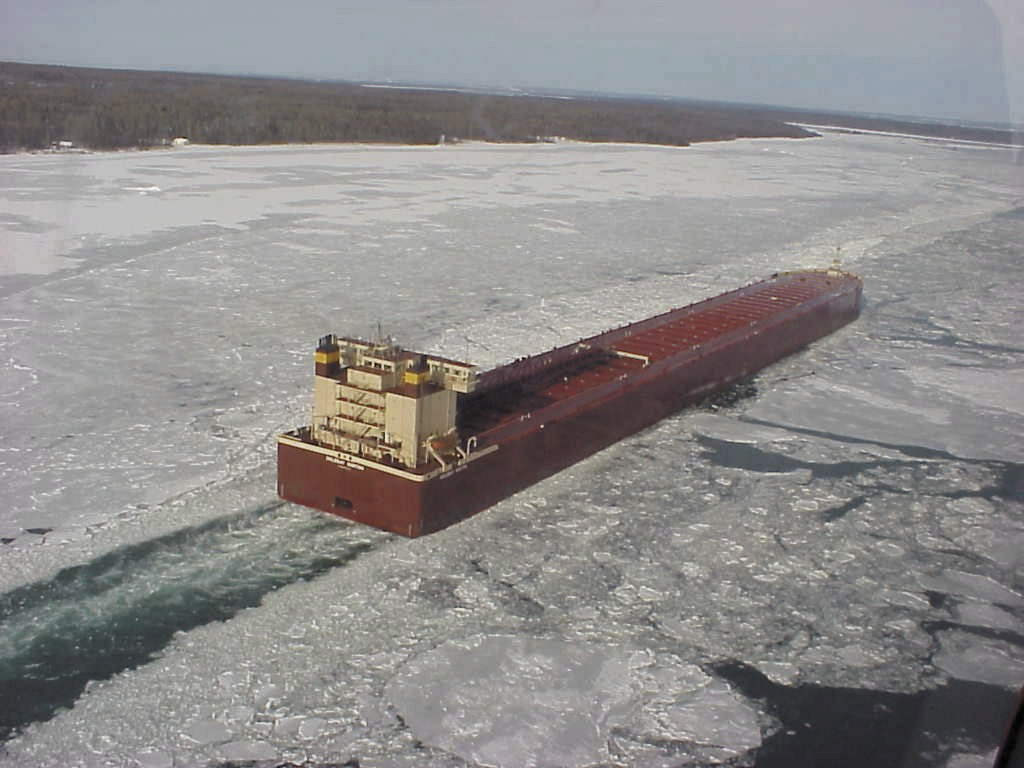
SS Oglebay Norton plows through ice on the St. Mary's River.

The Saint Marys River is listed as a Great Lakes Areas of Concern in the Great Lakes Water Quality Agreement between the United States and Canada.

== See also ==
- List of rivers of Michigan
- List of rivers of Ontario
