= List of shipwrecks in 1905 =

The list of shipwrecks in 1905 includes ships sunk, foundered, grounded, or otherwise lost during 1905.

table of contents
1905
Jan	Feb	Mar	Apr
May	Jun	Jul	Aug
Sep	Oct	Nov	Dec
Unknown date

== January ==
=== 1 January ===
List of shipwrecks: 1 January 1905
Ship	State	Description
Helsingfors	(Russian Empire) Grand Duchy of Finland	The passenger-cargo steamer ran aground and sank near Bengtskär, Grand Duchy of Finland, with the loss of two of her crew. She was on a voyage from Helsingfors, Grand Duchy of Finland, to Lübeck, Germany.
Protector	(Russian Empire) Grand Duchy of Finland	The ship ran aground and was wrecked near Bengtskär, Grand Duchy of Finland, while going to the assistance of Helsingfors( (Russian Empire) Grand Duchy of Finland). Three of her crew and a pilot were lost.

=== 2 January ===
List of shipwrecks: 2 January 1905
Ship	State	Description
Bditelni	Imperial Russian Navy	Russo-Japanese War: Siege of Port Arthur: The Delfin-class destroyer was scuttled at Port Arthur, Manchuria, China.
Boevoi	Imperial Russian Navy	Russo-Japanese War: Siege of Port Arthur: The Boevoi-class destroyer was scuttled at Port Arthur, Manchuria, China.
Djigit	Imperial Russian Navy	Russo-Japanese War: Siege of Port Arthur: The sloop-of-war was scuttled at Port Arthur, Manchuria, China.
Guidamak	Imperial Russian Navy	Russo-Japanese War: Siege of Port Arthur: The torpedo gunboat was scuttled at Port Arthur, Manchuria, China.
Otvajni	Imperial Russian Navy	Russo-Japanese War: Siege of Port Arthur: The armored gunvessel was scuttled at Port Arthur, Manchuria, China.
Razboinik	Imperial Russian Navy	Russo-Japanese War: Siege of Port Arthur: The sloop-of-war was scuttled at Port Arthur, Manchuria, China.
Razyashchi	Imperial Russian Navy	Russo-Japanese War: Siege of Port Arthur: The Puilki-class destroyer was scuttled at Port Arthur, Manchuria, China.
Sevastopol	Imperial Russian Navy	Russo-Japanese War: Siege of Port Arthur: The Petropavlovsk-class battleship was scuttled off Port Arthur, Manchuria, China.
Silni	Imperial Russian Navy	Russo-Japanese War: Siege of Port Arthur: The Puilki-class destroyer was scuttled at Port Arthur, Manchuria, China. She was refloated and repaired by the Japanese and placed in service as Fumizuki (Imperial Japanese Navy).
Storozhevoi	Imperial Russian Navy	Russo-Japanese War: Siege of Port Arthur: The Puilki-class destroyer, torpedoed by an Imperial Japanese Navy torpedo boat and beached on 16 December 1904, was scuttled at Port Arthur, Manchuria, China.

=== 3 January ===
List of shipwrecks: 3 January 1905
Ship	State	Description
Cornelia	United States	The tug was holed by ice and sank at dock in the Charles River at Boston, Massachusetts. She later was raised.
Defender	United States	The 514-gross register ton sternwheel paddle steamer sank when two of her boilers exploded on the Ohio River off Huntington, West Virginia. She sank to the main deck and everything left above water burned. There were 45 people on board; nine crewmen were killed and three people were injured.
Haudaudine	France	The full-rigged ship ran aground and sank off New Caledonia with no loss of life.

=== 10 January ===
List of shipwrecks: 10 January 1905
Ship	State	Description
Dalles City	United States	The steamer struck a rock between The Dalles, Oregon, and Portland, Oregon, and was beached.

=== 12 January ===
List of shipwrecks: 12 January 1905
Ship	State	Description
Unidentified canal boat	United States	The canal boat, under tow of the steamer Pottsville (United States), was sunk in a collision with the steamer J. Fred Lohman (United States) off Governor's Island, New York.

=== 13 January ===
List of shipwrecks: 13 January 1905
Ship	State	Description
Clydesdale	United Kingdom	The steamship ran aground on the Lady Rock, off Oban, Argyllshire, Scotland. She was a total loss.

=== 14 January ===
List of shipwrecks: 14 January 1905
Ship	State	Description
Sultana	Greece	The steamer was abandoned in a storm and foundered in the Mediterranean Sea, 20 nautical miles (37 km; 23 mi) off Tekirova and Adalia (now Antalya, Turkey) while on a voyage from Payas to Constantinople via Messina, with oranges. Crew safe.

=== 15 January ===
List of shipwrecks: 15 January 1905
Ship	State	Description
Lodalen	Sweden-Norway	The lake steamer was thrown some 350 metres (1,150 ft) ashore by a 40-metre (130 ft) tsunami created by a large rockfall into the lake Lovatnet in Norway. The wreck of Lodalen was thrown a further 150 m (490 ft) inland by another tsunami in 1936.
Unidentified boats		In addition to Lodalen, about 70 to 80 boats were wrecked or sunk by three tsunamis in Lovatnet that reached up to 40.5 metres (133 ft) in height.

=== 16 January ===
List of shipwrecks: 16 January 1905
Ship	State	Description
Volunteer	United States	The 26-gross register ton schooner sank at Sand Key in the Florida Keys. All eight people on board survived.

=== 17 January ===
List of shipwrecks: 17 January 1905
Ship	State	Description
Jack Jewett	United States	The steamer was moored at "Dolphins" in the East Haven River when ice crushed her bow. She was run onto some flats, but sank.

=== 18 January ===
List of shipwrecks: 18 January 1905
Ship	State	Description
Alexander Griggs	United States	The steamer stranded on rocks in the Entiat Rapids on the Columbia River, Washington. A total loss.
Optima	Germany	The four-masted barque was wrecked on Haisborough Sands, off the coast of Norfolk, United Kingdom, on voyage from Hamburg to Santa Rosalía, Mexico with coke.

=== 21 January ===
List of shipwrecks: 21 January 1905
Ship	State	Description
George W. Elder	United States	The 1,709-gross register ton steel-hulled screw steamer struck a rock in the Columbia River at Reuben, Oregon, and either was stranded or sank (sources disagree). All 73 people on board survived. She was raised in May 1906.
Volant	United States	The 172-gross register ton schooner was stranded in Bristol Bay on the coast of the District of Alaska. All six people aboard survived.

=== 22 January ===
List of shipwrecks: 22 January 1905
Ship	State	Description
Ray	United States	The motor vessel was sunk in a collision with Ocracoke (United States) in thick fog, Norfolk, Virginia.

=== 24 January ===
List of shipwrecks: 24 January 1905
Ship	State	Description
Mariechen	Germany	The steamer was wrecked in Chatham Strait at Chicagoff, District of Alaska. She was eventually refloated and taken to Juneau, Alaska, where temporary repairs were made. She was taken to Seattle, Washington, and beached in July 1906 and declared a total loss.

=== 25 January ===
List of shipwrecks: 25 January 1905
Ship	State	Description
Clarence	United States	The cargo ship sank in New York Harbor near Robbins Reef in a severe storm with the loss of her entire crew of seven. She later was raised by wreckers.
Conqueror	United States	The steamer lost her rudder in a northwest gale and was blown ashore, probably in the vicinity of Norfolk, Virginia.
S. D. Carlton	United States	The barge sank off Barnegat, New Jersey, in a severe gale and snowstorm. Her entire crew of four perished.

=== 26 January ===
List of shipwrecks: 26 January 1905
Ship	State	Description
Henry Whitney	United States	The 146-gross register ton schooner was stranded at Newport, Rhode Island. All three people on board survived.
Roebuck	United Kingdom	The rail car ferry caught fire at dock at Milford. The Milford Fire Department put out the fire, but the volume of water sank her. Refloated on 4 February. Repaired and returned to service in June.

=== 27 January ===
List of shipwrecks: 27 January 1905
Ship	State	Description
Charley Hook	United States	The steamer struck a dike in the Cumberland River at Canton, Kentucky, and sank in eight feet (2.4 m) of water.

=== 28 January ===
List of shipwrecks: 28 January 1905
Ship	State	Description
Edna Murray	United States	The tow steamer burned to the waterline in the harbor at Milford, Connecticut.
Manhanset	United States	The tow steamer burned and sank at the New York, New Haven and Hartford Railroad Wharf in New London, Connecticut.

=== 29 January ===
List of shipwrecks: 29 January 1905
Ship	State	Description
Mary L. Colbourne	United States	The 23-gross register ton schooner was stranded on Virginia's Tangier Island in the Chesapeake Bay. Both people aboard survived.

=== 30 January ===
List of shipwrecks: 30 January 1905
Ship	State	Description
Älba	United Kingdom	Älba The auxiliary schooner was driven ashore and wrecked at Zandvoort, North Holland, Netherlands.

=== 31 January ===
List of shipwrecks: 31 January 1905
Ship	State	Description
Anderson	United States	The steamer burned at dock at Grand Tower, Illinois, a total loss.
Skidby	United Kingdom	The steamship ran aground on Sable Island, Nova Scotia. Her crew survived. She was on a voyage from South Shields, County Durham to Baltimore, Maryland, United States.

=== Unknown date ===
List of shipwrecks: Unknown date January 1905
Ship	State	Description
Robert Center	United States	The 59-gross register ton schooner sank at sea. Both people on board survived.
Ollie Neville	United States	The 70-gross register ton sternwheel paddle steamer sank in the Ohio River at Ripley, Ohio, on 3 or 10 January. All three people on board survived.

== February ==
=== 4 February ===
List of shipwrecks: 4 February 1905
Ship	State	Description
Atlas	United States	With no one aboard, the 423-gross register ton barge was lost in a collision with the screw steamer Katahdin (United States) at Long Island City, New York.
Damara	United Kingdom	The Canadian-owned, British-registered steamer foundered off Sable Island, Newfoundland, or 30 miles (48 km) east of Halifax, Nova Scotia. 34 crewmen abandoned ship in two lifeboats. One lifeboat with her master and 14 crewmen was never seen again.
Lief Eriksson	Norway	The steamer was sunk in a collision in thick fog with City of Everett (United States) in the Atlantic Ocean off the coast of South Carolina (32°52′N 78°54′W). Two crew were killed. 20 crew were rescued by City of Everett.

=== 5 February ===
List of shipwrecks: 5 February 1905
Ship	State	Description
Hudson	United States	The 741-gross register ton sternwheel paddle steamer burned at Cincinnati, Ohio. Both people on board survived.
Ice Boat No. 3	United States	The sidewheel icebreaker struck a submerged shipwreck and sank before she could be beached in the National Harbor of Refuge, Delaware Bay, Delaware, United States. Crew rescued by Gettysburg, Teaser, and Boxer(all United States).

=== 7 February ===
List of shipwrecks: 7 February 1905
Ship	State	Description
Chas. J. Baker	United States	The tug was sunk when a hawser to a car float parted under load causing her to heel over and go down in the harbor of Baltimore, Maryland. Later raised.
Sully	French Navy	The Gloire-class armored cruiser was wrecked in Ha Long Bay, French Indochina, without loss of life.

=== 9 February ===
List of shipwrecks: 9 February 1905
Ship	State	Description
F. K. Hulings	United States	The steamer was sunk by ice in the Monongahela River at Greensboro, Pennsylvania.

=== 10 February ===
List of shipwrecks: 10 February 1905
Ship	State	Description
Chevalier	United States	The steamer was sunk by ice at Gallipolis, Ohio. Raised and repaired.
Mary N.	United States	The steamer sank over night at dock at Paducah, Kentucky.
Portsmouth	United States	The 76-gross register ton sternwheel paddle steamer ferry was sunk by ice in the Ohio River at Lashells Landing, Pennsylvania. All five people on board survived.

=== 12 February ===
List of shipwrecks: 12 February 1905
Ship	State	Description
Gazelle	United States	The steamer was wrecked by ice at Wheeling Island, West Virginia. Total loss.

=== 16 February ===
List of shipwrecks: 16 February 1905
Ship	State	Description
Owasco	United States	The tow steamer was damaged in a collision with John S. Smith (United States) in the North River. She returned to dock where she sank. Raised and repaired.
Wm. K. Kavanaugh	United States	The steamer sprung a leak and sank at dock, or while opening a channel through ice broke timbers in her hull and sank, in St. Louis, Missouri. Raised, repaired, and returned to service.

=== 17 February ===
List of shipwrecks: 17 February 1905
Ship	State	Description
Orizaba	United Kingdom	The wreck of Orizaba in 1910. The mail steamer was wrecked on Five Fathom Bank off Fremantle, Western Australia.
William Orr	United States	The tow steamer caught fire in Newtown Creek, New York and was beached. Her four crewmen left in her boat.

=== 18 February ===
List of shipwrecks: 18 February 1905
Ship	State	Description
Waltham	United States	The schooner ran ashore on Race Rock, Fishers Island, New York. Later pulled off

=== 22 February ===
List of shipwrecks: 22 February 1905
Ship	State	Description
Eliza J. Pendleton	United States	The 751-gross register ton schooner was abandoned in the North Atlantic Ocean off Fire Island, New York. All eight people on board survived.

=== 25 February ===
List of shipwrecks: 25 February 1905
Ship	State	Description
Conveyor	United States	The laid up steamer was sunk at dock by ice across the river from Evansville, Indiana. raised and repaired.
S. A. McCaulley	United States	The tow steamer was damaged by ice while towing the lighter Haverford (United States) in the Delaware River off the mouth of Mantua Creek. She was beached in Mantua Creek.
Southwark	United States	The tow steamer was crushed by ice while towing the lighter Haverford (United States) in the Delaware River off the mouth of Mantua Creek and sank in 20 feet (6.1 m) of water. Her crew walked across the ice to shore.

=== 27 February ===
List of shipwrecks: 27 February 1905
Ship	State	Description
Amanda	United States	The steamer was sailing at the mouth of the harbor in New Haven, Connecticut when ice crushed some of her hull and she sank in 18 feet (5.5 m) of water. Later raised.
Arthur B.	United States	The fishing steamer burned and sank at dock in Portland, Maine, a total loss.
Josie	United States	The 197-gross register ton barge sank at St. Louis, Missouri. The only person on board survived.
Katherine	United States	The ferry was sunk by ice, or an obstruction, between Cairo, Illinois and Birds Point, Missouri. Later raised, repaired, and returned to service.
Oregon	United States	The steamer caught fire at sea off Crescent City, California. Passengers rescued by Del Norte (United States). The vessel make it to the harbor and was beached and left to smolder after a 48-hour battle.
Romulus	Germany	Russo-Japanese War: The steamer struck an iceberg on 21 February off Cape Soya on a trip to Vladivostok and sprung leaks. She was seized by a Japanese cruiser for inspection on 26 February and ordered to Hakodate. Her leaks grew worse and was beached at Aomori Ken on 27 February, became a total loss.

=== Unknown date ===
List of shipwrecks: Unknown date February 1905
Ship	State	Description
Flora Temple	United States	The 7-gross register ton sloop was stranded at Gloucester, Virginia. All four people on board survived.
Moy	United Kingdom	The iron sailing ship disappeared during a voyage from British Guiana to Liverpool.

== March ==
=== 2 March ===
List of shipwrecks: 2 March 1905
Ship	State	Description
Ava	United States	The tow steamer struck the jetty at Town Creek, North Carolina on the Peedee River and sank.

=== 3 March ===
List of shipwrecks: 3 March 1905
Ship	State	Description
Delta	United States	The steamer was destroyed by fire at dock at Harwood Landing, Arkansas.

=== 4 March ===
List of shipwrecks: 4 March 1905
Ship	State	Description
Cyrano	United Kingdom	World War I: The 108.6-foot (33.1 m), 179-ton steam trawler was sunk in a collision with trawler Devonshire (United Kingdom) 130 miles north northeast of Spurn Point.

=== 5 March ===
List of shipwrecks: 5 March 1905
Ship	State	Description
Ignacio Roca	Uruguay	The cargo ship departed from West Hartlepool, County Durham, United Kingdom for Barcelona, Spain. No further trace, presumed foundered with the loss of all hands.
J. B. Leeds	United States	The 234-gross register ton schooner sank off Luzon in the Philippine Islands. All seven people on board survived.

=== 6 March ===
List of shipwrecks: 6 March 1905
Ship	State	Description
Nyack	United States	The steamer struck an obstruction on Lake Michigan putting two holes in her bow. She sank on arrival at Grand Haven, Michigan. Raised and taken to Milwaukee, Wisconsin for repairs.

=== 9 March ===
List of shipwrecks: 9 March 1905
Ship	State	Description
Delta	United States	The steamer sprung a leak and sank at dock at the foot of Lawrence Street, Cincinnati, Ohio. Immediately raised, repaired and returned to service.
Geo. Matheson	United States	The steamer was sunk by ice at dock at the foot of Congress Avenue, Cincinnati, Ohio. Total loss.
Relief	United States	The steamer was sunk by ice at dock at the foot of Lawrence Street, Cincinnati, Ohio. Total loss.

=== 13 March ===
List of shipwrecks: 13 March 1905
Ship	State	Description
Mildred	United States	The steamer was caught on the top of a wall at Lock 13 in the Ohio River and sank.

=== 14 March ===
List of shipwrecks: 14 March 1905
Ship	State	Description
Khyber	United Kingdom	The 1,967-ton barque was wrecked under the cliff at Tol-Pedn-Penwith, Cornwall. Neither the Penzance or Sennen Lifeboats could reach the ship and twenty-three crew lost their lives.

=== 15 March ===
List of shipwrecks: 15 March 1905
Ship	State	Description
Rosie	United Kingdom	The sailing vessel dragged anchor and lost a mast in a gale and was driven ashore at Abersoch under Castellmarch, Wales. Crew rescued.

=== 18 March ===
List of shipwrecks: 18 March 1905
Ship	State	Description
Arctic	United States	The laid-up steamer was pushed against a riverbank by ice, causing her to careen, fill with water, and sink at Muscatine, Iowa. She was raised and repaired.

=== 19 March ===
List of shipwrecks: 19 March 1905
Ship	State	Description
Spartan	United States	The 1,596-gross register ton steel-hulled screw steamer was wrecked in fog just off the eastern shore of Block Island off Rhode Island, just south of Old Harbor Point. All 30 people on board survived. The wreck settled in 15 feet (4.6 m) of water at 41°09.680′N 071°32.566′W.

=== 25 March ===
List of shipwrecks: 25 March 1905
Ship	State	Description
Parisian	United Kingdom	The steamship collided with the steamer Albano (flag unknown) during a voyage from Liverpool, Lancashire to Halifax, Nova Scotia. She reached Halifax, where she sank from damage sustained in the collision.

=== 26 March ===
List of shipwrecks: 26 March 1906
Ship	State	Description
Honolulu	United States	The 1,053-gross register ton iron-hulled schooner departed Shanghai, China, bound for Port Townsend, Washington, with 11 people on board and was never heard from again.

=== 27 March ===
List of shipwrecks: 27 March 1905
Ship	State	Description
Key City	United States	The steamer was sunk by an obstruction at Belgrade, Illinois, two miles (3.2 km) above Metropolis, Illinois. The wreck was a total loss.

=== 29 March ===
List of shipwrecks: 29 March 1905
Ship	State	Description
Eagle	United States	The 6-gross register ton sloop sank in the Gulf of Mexico off Sarasota, Florida. All six people on board survived.

=== 30 March ===
List of shipwrecks: 30 March 1905
Ship	State	Description
Bart E. Linehan	United States	The steamer caught fire at dock at Ryman's Elevator, Nashville, Tennessee. She drifted several hundred feet down stream before sinking. Wreck removed in 1906 as a hazard to navigation.

=== 31 March ===
List of shipwrecks: 31 March 1905
Ship	State	Description
Annie Root	United States	The 47-gross register ton schooner was stranded on the bar off Galveston, Texas. Both people on board survived.

== April ==
=== 3 April ===
List of shipwrecks: 3 April 1905
Ship	State	Description
Alison Briggs	United States	The tow steamer was damaged in a collision with Freighter Daniel Wheeler (United States) in the East River off Pier 16. She tried to make it back to dock but sank near Pier 19. Raised and repaired.

=== 4 April ===
List of shipwrecks: 4 April 1905
Ship	State	Description
Sprite	United States	The steamer was wrecked three miles (4.8 km) north of Whitehall, Michigan.

=== 6 April ===
List of shipwrecks: 6 April 1905
Ship	State	Description
Texas	United States	The barge was wrecked in dense fog on Block Island, Rhode Island. Two crewmen were killed.

=== 7 April ===
List of shipwrecks: 7 April 1905
Ship	State	Description
Louisiana	United States	The steamer listed to starboard while loading cargo at New Orleans, Louisiana, causing her to fill with water through the portholes and sink. One crewman missing. She capsized and apparently broke up during salvage efforts eight months later.
Unknown	United States	The canal boat's tow line to "Triton" snapped causing her to go over the state dam at Troy, New York, and that sank her, crew taken off just before she sank. "Triton' went over also with her Captain drowning, but she didn't sink.

=== 8 April ===
List of shipwrecks: 8 April 1905
Ship	State	Description
Greenville	United States	The tug was sunk in the North River when it passed a line to a scow, with the intention of pulling it down river, that was still being pulled up river. When the line tightened the tug was pulled over, filled with water and sank. Three of six crewmen were killed. Later raised.

=== 10 April ===
List of shipwrecks: 10 April 1905
Ship	State	Description
Sophie Wood	United States	The steamer was sunk by an open siphon pipe, Norfolk, Virginia. Apparently raised and hull found to be in bad condition.

=== 12 April ===
List of shipwrecks: 12 April 1905
Ship	State	Description
Bristol Packet	United Kingdom	The ketch was driven ashore and wrecked at Oxwich, Glamorgan.
Indefatiguable	United Kingdom	The tug struck rocks in the Bristol Channel She was abandoned two days later.

=== 15 April ===
List of shipwrecks: 15 April 1905
Ship	State	Description
Cyclone	United States	The 92-gross register ton sternwheel paddle steamer was destroyed by fire on the Monongahela River at Dravosburg, Pennsylvania. All 15 people on board survived.

=== 16 April ===
List of shipwrecks: 16 April 1905
Ship	State	Description
Charlotte L. Morgan	United States	The 70-gross register ton schooner was stranded at Southern Island, Maine. All three people on board survived.

=== 19 April ===
List of shipwrecks: 19 April 1905
Ship	State	Description
Rover	United States	The tow steamer was sunk in a collision with tow steamer Maria Hoffman (United States) in Newtown Creek, New York. She rolled over enough to fill with water and sank. Later raised.

=== 20 April ===
List of shipwrecks: 20 April 1905
Ship	State	Description
Alicia	Spain	The cargo ship was wrecked on Ajax Reef, Florida. Her crew was rescued by passing ship and landed at Havana, Cuba. Wreck partially scrapped in place.

=== 22 April ===
List of shipwrecks: 22 April 1905
Ship	State	Description
Del Norte	United States	The schooner was in a collision with Sea Foam (United States) at sea off the Coquille River, a total loss.

=== Unknown date ===
List of shipwrecks: Unknown date April 1905
Ship	State	Description
Irma L. Wheeleror Inna L. Wheeler	United States	The 51-gross register ton screw steamer was destroyed by fire at Pine Lake, Michigan, or at Charlevoix, Michigan on either 1 or 3 April. All 14 people on board survived.

== May ==
=== 1 May ===
List of shipwrecks: 1 May 1905
Ship	State	Description
Ettie M	United States	With no one aboard, the 14-gross register ton sternwheel motor paddle vessel was stranded on the Missouri River near Vermillion, South Dakota.

=== 2 May ===
List of shipwrecks: 2 May 1905
Ship	State	Description
William H. Rounds	United States	William H. Rounds Carrying a cargo of coal, the wooden schooner ran aground on the coast of Lake Huron near Black River, Michigan, and became a total loss. Her wreck lies in 11 feet (3.4 m) of water at 44.836983°N 83.282317°W.

=== 3 May ===
List of shipwrecks: 3 May 1905
Ship	State	Description
Almedia	Norway	The full-rigged ship was wrecked near Nouméa, New Caledonia.
Moonbeam	United States	The barge foundered off Point Judith, Rhode Island. Her master, his young son and daughter and two crewmen were killed.
Rocket	United States	The tug struck a sunken crib in the harbor at Lorain, Ohio and sank. Later raised.

=== 4 May ===
List of shipwrecks: 4 May 1905
Ship	State	Description
Hesper	United States	Part of the wreck of Hesper on 8 September 2007. The bulk carrier was wrecked and sank in a severe storm in Silver Bay, Lake Superior.
John C. Gregory	United States	The 379-gross register ton schooner was sunk in a collision in thick fog with the screw steamer Ontario (United States) 11 miles (18 km) southwest of Gay Head, Massachusetts. Her entire crew of eight survived and was rescued by Ontario.
Unknown barge	United States	The dumper barge, under tow of John Fleming (United States), foundered in the lower bay of the harbor of New York City. The man in charge of it drowned.

=== 5 May ===
List of shipwrecks: 5 May 1905
Ship	State	Description
Delfin	Imperial Russian Navy	The Minonosets No. 150-class submarine was sunk by an internal explosion at Vladivostok. Raised, repaired, and returned to service.
Mary	United States	The steamer capsized and sank at dock in a high windstorm at Beardstown, Illinois. Later raised.
Yawata Maru	Japan	Russo-Japanese War: The 100-gross register ton merchant ship was captured and sunk in the Sea of Japan by Imperial Russian Navy torpedo boats.

=== 7 May ===
List of shipwrecks: 7 May 1905
Ship	State	Description
Aransas	United States	The 241-foot (73 m), 1,156-gross register ton passenger steamer sank in 65 feet (20 m) of water after colliding in thick fog with the schooner barge Glendower (flag unknown), which was under tow by Patience (United States), off Pollock Rip Shoal off Chatham, Massachusetts. One passenger was killed. Glendower rescued the survivors. Aransas's wreck later was deemed a hazard to navigation and was blown up.

=== 9 May ===
List of shipwrecks: 9 May 1905
Ship	State	Description
D. D. Haskell	United States	The 317-gross register ton schooner was stranded on the coast of North Carolina near Ocracoke Inlet. All five people on board survived.

=== 11 May ===
List of shipwrecks: 11 May 1905
Ship	State	Description
Maiko Maru	Japan	Russo-Japanese War: The cargo ship struck a mine and sank in Korea Bay off the Elliot Islands.

=== 12 May ===
List of shipwrecks: 12 May 1905
Ship	State	Description
Belle of Calhoun	United States	The steamer struck a log and sank near Squaw Island in the Mississippi River. Raised, repaired, and returned to service.

=== 13 May ===
List of shipwrecks: 13 May 1905
Ship	State	Description
J. Nickerson	United States	The 179-gross register ton schooner was stranded at Johns Island Ledge on the coast of Maine. All six people on board survived.

=== 14 May ===
List of shipwrecks: 14 May 1905
Ship	State	Description
H. and A. Morse	United States	The 133-gross register ton screw steamer burned at Crossman Dock on the Raritan River in New Jersey. All four people on board survived.

=== 15 May ===
List of shipwrecks: 15 May 1905
Ship	State	Description
Viking	Canada	The schooner ran aground and was wrecked off Leigan Head, Nova Scotia (46°14′N 60°02′W).

=== 16 May ===
List of shipwrecks: 16 May 1905
Ship	State	Description
Thomas W. Palmer	United States	The steamer was sunk in a collision with Harvard (United States) in heavy fog 30 miles (48 km) off Manitou Island Light in Lake Superior. The crew were rescued by Harvard.

=== 18 May ===
List of shipwrecks: 18 May 1905
Ship	State	Description
Louise	United States	The steamer ran into Ironsides (United States) while coming to dock at Middleport, Ohio crushing her stem. She was beached, but sank in shallow water and was wrecked.

=== 25 May ===
List of shipwrecks: 25 May 1905
Ship	State	Description
Alcona	United States	The steamer was in the Niagara River off Tonawanda, New York when she struck an obstruction breaking her shoe, stern post and wheel and causing a leak. She made it back to her dock where she sank.

=== 27 May ===
List of shipwrecks: 27 May 1905
Ship	State	Description
Borodino	Imperial Russian Navy	Russo-Japanese War, Battle of Tsushima: The Borodino-class battleship exploded, capsized, and sank in the Tsushima Strait after various Imperial Japanese Navy battleships inflicted numerous shell hits on her. Only one member of her 855-man crew survived.
H. J. Hoole	United States	The tug capsized, filled with water, and sank while coaling at Wilkerson's Wharf, Virginia. She later was raised.
Imperator Aleksandr III	Imperial Russian Navy	Russo-Japanese War, Battle of Tsushima: The Borodino-class battleship capsized and sank in the Tsushima Strait with the loss of all hands after numerous shell hits inflicted by various Imperial Japanese Navy ships over the course of several hours.
Kamchatka	Imperial Russian Navy	Russo-Japanese War: Battle of Tsushima: The armed repair ship was sunk by gunfire.
Knyaz Suvorov	Imperial Russian Navy	Russo-Japanese War, Battle of Tsushima: The Borodino-class battleship capsized and sank in the Tsushima Strait with the loss of 928 of her crew after numerous shell and torpedo hits inflicted by various Imperial Japanese Navy ships over the course of several hours. Twenty officers taken off earlier by the destroyer Buinyi (Imperial Russian Navy) were her only survivors.
No. 34	Imperial Japanese Navy	Russo-Japanese War, Battle of Tsushima: The torpedo boat was sunk by gunfire.
No. 35	Imperial Japanese Navy	Russo-Japanese War, Battle of Tsushima: The torpedo boat was sunk by gunfire.
No. 69	Imperial Japanese Navy	Russo-Japanese War, Battle of Tsushima: The torpedo boat sank after colliding with the destroyer Yamabiko (Imperial Japanese Navy).
Oslyabya	Imperial Russian Navy	Russo-Japanese War, Battle of Tsushima: The Peresvet-class battleship sank in the Tsushima Strait with the loss of at least 471 – and perhaps as many as 514 – lives after suffering numerous shell hits inflicted by several Imperial Japanese Navy battleships and armored cruisers. Between 376 and 385 of her crew were saved by various Russian warships.
Ural	Imperial Russian Navy	Russo-Japanese War, Battle of Tsushima: The armed merchant cruiser sank in the Tsushima Strait after being hit by a shell fired by an Imperial Japanese Navy battleship and torpedoed by an Imperial Japanese Navy destroyer.

=== 28 May ===
List of shipwrecks: 28 May 1905
Ship	State	Description
Admiral Nakhimov	Imperial Russian Navy	Russo-Japanese War: Battle of Tsushima: Damaged by numerous shell hits from various Imperial Japanese Navy warships the previous day, the armored cruiser either struck a mine or was torpedoed by an unidentified ship and sank in the Tsushima Strait near Tsushima Island with the loss of 18 lives; her commanding officer claimed that she was scuttled. The auxiliary cruiser Sado Maru (Imperial Japanese Navy) rescued 523 survivors, and another 103 survivors escaped in Admiral Nakhimov's lifeboats but were captured by the Japanese later.
Admiral Ushakov	Imperial Russian Navy	Russo-Japanese War: Battle of Tsushima: The Admiral Ushakov-class coastal defense ship, badly damaged in action with Imperial Japanese Navy warships and ablaze, was scuttled in the Tsushima Strait.
Bezuprechni	Imperial Russian Navy	Russo-Japanese War, Battle of Tsushima: The Boiki-class destroyer was sunk in Tsushima Strait by the protected cruiser Chitose (Imperial Japanese Navy).
Blestyashtchi	Imperial Russian Navy	Russo-Japanese War, Battle of Tsushima: The crew of the heavily damaged Boiki-class destroyer scuttled her in the Sea of Japan.
Buinyi	Imperial Russian Navy	Russo-Japanese War: Battle of Tsushima: The Buinyi-class destroyer was scuttled in the Tsushima Strait either after her machinery broke down or she ran out of fuel (sources disagree). The wounded Russian Vice Admiral Zinovy Rozhestvensky was transferred from Buinyi to the destroyer Biedovi (Imperial Russian Navy), and Buinyi's crew along with 205 survivors of the sunken battleship Oslyabya (Imperial Russian Navy) aboard Buinyi were taken off by the armored cruiser Dmitrii Donskoi (Imperial Russian Navy). Dmitri Donskoi then sank Buinyi with gunfire 70 nautical miles (130 km; 81 mi) south of Dagelet Island.
Buistri	Imperial Russian Navy	Russo-Japanese War: In the aftermath of the Battle of Tsushima, the Boiki-class destroyer ran aground on the coast of Korea and was blown up by her crew to prevent her capture by Japanese forces. Survivors were rescued by the armed merchant cruiser America Maru (Imperial Japanese Navy).
Dewey	United States	The launch was sunk in a collision with Arctic (United States) in San Francisco Bay. Two killed.
Gromki	Imperial Russian Navy	Russo-Japanese War, Battle of Tsushima: The crew of the heavily damaged Boiki-class destroyer scuttled her in the Sea of Japan.
Mollie L. Farmer	United States	The steamer burned at dock in Newbern, North Carolina.
Navarin	Imperial Russian Navy	Russo-Japanese War: Battle of Tsushima: After suffering heavy damage from gunfire by Imperial Japanese Navy battleships the previous day, the battleship capsized and sank in the Tsushima Strait with the loss of 671 lives. Only three of her crew survived.
Sissoi Veliky	Imperial Russian Navy	Russo-Japanese War: Battle of Tsushima: Badly damaged by gunfire and torpedo hits inflicted by various Imperial Japanese Navy warships and with 47 of her crew killed, the battleship capsized and sank while under tow by the Japanese after surrendering to them. Her 613 survivors were rescued by the armed merchant cruisers Shinano Maru and Dainan Maru (both Imperial Japanese Navy).
Svetlana	Imperial Russian Navy	Russo-Japanese War: Battle of Tsushima: The protected cruiser was sunk by gunfire by the protected cruisers Niitaka and Otowa and the destroyer Murakumo (all Imperial Japanese Navy) in the Sea of Japan southwest of Dagelet Island at 37°6′N 129°50′E with an estimated 169 members of her crew killed. The auxiliary cruiser America Maru (Imperial Japanese Navy) rescued 290 survivors, of whom 23 were wounded.
Vladimir Monomakh	Imperial Russian Navy	Russo-Japanese War: Battle of Tsushima: Badly damaged by an Imperial Japanese Navy torpedo hit the previous day, the armored cruiser was scuttled in the Tsushima Strait near Tsushima Island. Her survivors were rescued by the auxiliary cruisers Sado Maru and Manchu Maru (both Imperial Japanese Navy).

=== 29 May ===
List of shipwrecks: 29 May 1905
Ship	State	Description
Dmitrii Donskoi	Imperial Russian Navy	Russo-Japanese War: Badly damaged in combat with Imperial Japanese Navy warships during the Battle of Tsushima the previous day, the armored cruiser was scuttled in the Sea of Japan off Ulleungdo. Her survivors were rescued by the destroyer Fubukiand armed merchant cruiser Kasugu Maru (both Imperial Japanese Navy). Her wreck was located in 2018.
Hiram R. Bond	United States	The sand scow was sunk in a collision with Pere Marquette 20 (United States) in heavy fog entering the harbor at Milwaukee, Wisconsin.
Irtuish	Imperial Russian Navy	Russo-Japanese War: The armed transport foundered.
Izumrud	Imperial Russian Navy	The wreck of Izumrud Russo-Japanese War: The Izumrud-class protected cruiser ran aground near Vladivostok, Russia, and was destroyed by explosive charges set by her crew.
Seaconnet	United States	The 188-gross register ton steam screw fishing vessel was wrecked in heavy fog on the bar off Shinnecock Light on the coast of New York. All 23 people on board survived.
Svetlana	Imperial Russian Navy	Russo-Japanese War: The protected cruiser was sunk by gunfire by the protected cruisers Niitaka and Otowa and destroyer Murakumo (all Imperial Japanese Navy) in the Sea of Japan off the east coast of the Korean Peninsula at (37°06′N 129°50′E). The auxiliary cruiser America Maru (Imperial Japanese Navy) rescued 290 survivors, 23 of whom were injured.

=== 30 May ===
List of shipwrecks: 30 May 1905
Ship	State	Description
Tetartos	Germany	Russo-Japanese War: During a voyage from Otaru, Japan, to Tianjin, China, with a cargo of wooden sleepers, the 2,409-gross register ton merchant ship was captured and sunk in the Yellow Sea by the auxiliary cruiser Rion (Imperial Russian Navy).

=== 31 May ===
List of shipwrecks: 31 May 1905
Ship	State	Description
George T. Burroughs	United States	The steamer was sunk in a collision in the St. Clair River.

=== Unknown date ===
List of shipwrecks: Unknown date May 1905
Ship	State	Description
Benguela	United Kingdom	The Elder Dempster 1,796 GRT cargo ship was wrecked at Nana Kroo, Sierra Leone. She was on a voyage to Hamburg with palm kernels and oil.
Mary	United States	The schooner sank in the St. Jones River, Delaware one-half mile (0.80 km) above Trunk Ditch sometime in May. Wreck removed with dynamite.
Katherine	United Kingdom	The fishing trawler was sunk in a collision in the North Sea sometime in May.

== June ==
=== 1 June ===
List of shipwrecks: 1 June 1905
Ship	State	Description
Nanny	Germany	The barque was wrecked on the coast of Natal. She was on a voyage from Bombay, India, to East London, South Africa.

=== 2 June ===
List of shipwrecks: 2 June 1905
Ship	State	Description
H. M. Carter	United States	The steamer struck a bridge just below Alexandria, Louisiana, at the mouth of the Red River and sank, either without loss of life or 20 killed.

=== 5 June ===
List of shipwrecks: 5 June 1905
Ship	State	Description
Ikhona	United Kingdom	Russo-Japanese War: During a voyage from Rangoon to Yokohama, Japan, with a cargo of rice and mail, the 5,252-gross register ton merchant ship was captured and sunk at a position identified both as 150 nautical miles (280 km) north of Hong Kong and in the Philippine Sea at 20°02′N 134°01′E. by the auxiliary cruiser Terek (Imperial Russian Navy).
St Kilda	United Kingdom	Russo-Japanese War: During a voyage from Hong Kong to Yokohama, Japan, with a cargo that included rice, sugar, and gunnies, the 3,518-gross register ton merchant ship was captured and sunk off Hong Kong by the auxiliary cruiser Dnepr (Imperial Russian Navy).

=== 7 June ===
List of shipwrecks: 7 June 1905
Ship	State	Description
Grace M.	United States	The fishing steamer was sunk in a collision with CGS Vigilant (Canada) six miles (9.7 km) east of Middle Island in Lake Erie. Two crewmen killed.

=== 8 June ===
List of shipwrecks: 8 June 1905
Ship	State	Description
HMS A8	Royal Navy	The A-class submarine foundered in Plymouth Sound off the coast of England when her bow dipped suddenly, causing her to be swamped by flooding via the open hatch on her conning tower. She was refloated, repaired, and returned to service.

=== 10 June ===
List of shipwrecks: 10 June 1905
Ship	State	Description
Yakima	United States	The steamer stranded on Stag Island in Lake Huron. On 13 June she was destroyed by fire. Later her remains were refloated, towed out into the lake and sunk.

=== 13 June ===
List of shipwrecks: 13 June 1905
Ship	State	Description
Tuscumbia	United States	With no one on board, the 20-gross register ton barge sank at Diermanns Landing, Missouri.
Yakima	United States	The 1,986-gross register ton screw steamer burned on the St. Clair River in Michigan. All 17 people on board survived.

=== 15 June ===
List of shipwrecks: 15 June 1905
Ship	State	Description
Harriet A. Hart	United States	The steamer burned to the waterline on Lake Huron between Cheboygan, Michigan and Sault Ste. Marie, Michigan. Crew and passengers rescued from lifeboats by Juniata (United States).
Hydrangea	United Kingdom	The Milford Haven steam trawler was heading for the fishing grounds off the Isles of Scilly but was off course and hit the Seven Stones Reef. Her crew reached the Sevenstones Lightship.
James Hughes	United States	The tug burned and sank off Plum Island in Long Island Sound.
Queen Victoria	United States	The 6-gross register ton schooner sank in Adams Creek in North Carolina. Both people on board survived.

=== 17 June ===
List of shipwrecks: 17 June 1905
Ship	State	Description
Garden City	United States	The steamer burned at dock in Port Orchard, Washington.

=== 18 June ===
List of shipwrecks: 18 June 1905
Ship	State	Description
Etruria	United States	The steam cargo ship, a steel bulk carrier, was on a voyage from Toledo, Ohio, to Superior, Wisconsin, with a cargo of coal when the cargo steamer Amasa Stone (United States) accidentally rammed her in Lake Huron north of Presque Isle, Michigan. She eventually rolled over and sank in 310 feet (94 m) of water at 45.483°N 83.473683°W.

=== 20 June ===
List of shipwrecks: 20 June 1905
Ship	State	Description
Vulcan	United States	The steamer capsized and sank in the Monongahela River below Coal Center, Pennsylvania. Raised and repaired.

=== 21 June ===
List of shipwrecks: 21 June 1905
Ship	State	Description
George W. Perkins	United States	The schooner was wrecked on the beach at Nome, District of Alaska.
Volant	United States	Carrying a cargo of 100 tons of general merchandise, the 172-gross register ton, 123-foot (37.5 m) schooner dragged her anchors and was stranded on the shore of Kuskokwim Bay in the District of Alaska, becoming a total loss. Her seven-man crew survived.

=== 22 June ===
List of shipwrecks: 22 June 1905
Ship	State	Description
Archon	United States	The steamer sank off Plum Island Point just outside the Atchafalaya River.
Hustler	United States	The steamer was capsized by high winds in a cloudburst in Lake Verret 2 1/2 miles (4.0 km) from shore in 11 feet (3.4 m) of water.
Prinsesse Marie	Denmark	Russo-Japanese War: During a voyage from Copenhagen, Denmark, to Yokohama, Japan, and other ports, the 5,416-gross register ton merchant ship was captured and sunk in the South China Sea at 13°57′N 113°15′E by the auxiliary cruiser Terek (Imperial Russian Navy).

=== 23 June ===
List of shipwrecks: 23 June 1905
Ship	State	Description
J. E. Leonard	United States	The 83-gross register ton sternwheel paddle steamer was destroyed by fire either in Redstone Creek, Pennsylvania or in the Monongahela River near Redstone Creek (sources disagree). All eight people on board survived.
Linden	United States	The steamer was sunk in a collision with City of Rome (United States) in the St. Clair River. Two killed. Wreck was removed.

=== 24 June ===
List of shipwrecks: 24 June 1905
Ship	State	Description
Shamrock	United States	Shamrock During a voyage from Toledo, Ohio, to Midland, Ontario, Canada, the wooden steam barge became waterlogged in Lake Huron during a gale but did not sink due to a buoyant cargo. She was beached at Black River, Michigan, then towed to Alpena, Michigan, where she was scuttled in 11 feet (3.4 m) of water near the mouth of the Thunder Bay River at 45.051283°N 83.4342°W and abandoned.
Unidentified launch	United States	The naptha launch was sunk in a collision with Nantasket (United States) in the East River off New York City's 134th Street in Manhattan.

=== 25 June ===
List of shipwrecks: 25 June 1905
Ship	State	Description
Cousins Arbib	Belgium	The steamer collided with the steamer IJmuiden (Netherlands) 20 nautical miles (37 km) off Flamborough Head, England. Later raised, repaired and sold, re-entering service in 1909.
Rattler	United States	The 82-gross register ton schooner was stranded at Todd Head, Nova Scotia. All three people on board survived.

=== 26 June ===
List of shipwrecks: 26 June 1905
Ship	State	Description
Shamrock	United States	The 403-gross register ton screw steamer sink in Lake Huron near Thunder Bay on the coast of Michigan. All 12 people on board survived.

=== 30 June ===
List of shipwrecks: 30 June 1905
Ship	State	Description
Shiloh	United States	The 7-gross register ton sloop sank in Narragansett Bay on the coast of Rhode Island. The only person on board survived.

=== Unknown date ===
List of shipwrecks: Unknown date June 1905
Ship	State	Description
Kingfisher	United States	The steamer capsized and sank while tied to the bank at Fulton, Arkansas during a heavy storm. Had not been raised at end of 1906.
Rose	United States	With no one on board, the 9-gross register ton motor paddle vessel sank at Paducah, Kentucky.

== July ==
=== 1 July ===
List of shipwrecks: 1 July 1905
Ship	State	Description
Georgii Pobedonosets	Imperial Russian Navy	1905 Russian Revolution: Potemkin mutiny: The Ekaterina II-class battleship was run aground at Odesa after Czarist sailors regained control. Later refloated.
Mabel and Edith	United States	The schooner was aground in Stockton Slough when she was struck by the barge Argus and sank in ten feet (3.0 m) of water.

=== 2 July ===
List of shipwrecks: 2 July 1905
Ship	State	Description
Frank G. Rich	United States	The 105-gross register ton schooner was stranded at Liscomb, Nova Scotia. All 18 people on board survived.

=== 3 July ===
List of shipwrecks: 3 July 1905
Ship	State	Description
Argo	United States	The 14-gross register ton schooner sank off Ludlington, Michigan. Both people on board survived.
Chromo	United States	The 8-gross register ton schooner was sunk in a collision in thick fog with the steamer Calvin Austen (United States) in Boston Bay off Boston Light on the coast of Massachusetts. One crewman was killed. Two or four survivors (sources differ) were rescued by Calvin Austen.
Louise	United States	The laid up steamer sprung a leak and sank at dock in the Kentucky River. Raised and repaired.

=== 4 July ===
List of shipwrecks: 4 July 1905
Ship	State	Description
Walworth	United States	The 18-gross register ton steam yacht burned on the Illinois and Michigan Canal. Both people on board survived.

=== 5 July ===
List of shipwrecks: 5 July 1905
Ship	State	Description
Diana	United Kingdom	The Newlyn lugger steamed into the Hamburgans Rocks off Penzance promenade, Cornwall, when the watchman fell asleep after a night of fishing. She was refloated on the late afternoon tide.
Farfadet	French Navy	The Farfadet-class submarine sank at Sidi Abdullah, French Tunisia with the loss of 14 lives. Raised, repaired and recommissioned in September 1909 as Follet.
Liberty	United States	With no one on board, the 18-gross register ton screw steamer was destroyed by fire at dock at St. Albans Bay, Vermont.

=== 8 July ===
List of shipwrecks: 8 July 1905
Ship	State	Description
Potemkin	Royal Romanian Navy	The Imperial Russian Navy battleship was partly scuttled in the Port of Constanța by her mutinous Russian crew after surrendering to Romanian authorities, who hoisted the Romanian flag aboard her.
Roy J. Cram (or Roys J. Cram)	United States	The 19-gross register ton steam screw tug was destroyed by fire at dock at New Baltimore, New York. All three people on board survived.
Sarah C. Smith	United States	The 297-gross register ton schooner was sunk in a collision with the screw steamer Governor Dingley (United States) in dense fog near Portland Head on the coast of Maine.
W. W. O'Neil	United States	The steamer struck an obstruction and sank in the Louisville and Portland Canal. Raised and repaired.
Welcome	United States	The steamer sank at dock in the Chicago River due to bad caulking. Raised and repaired.

=== 11 July ===
List of shipwrecks: 11 July 1905
Ship	State	Description
Normandie	United States	The 13-gross register ton steam screw yacht was sunk in a collision with the screw steamer Volund (Norway) in the Hudson River off Dobbs Ferry, New York. Three people on board – two crewman and a female passenger – were killed; sources differ as to whether three people were rescued or there were no survivors.

=== 13 July ===
List of shipwrecks: 13 July 1905
Ship	State	Description
Beatrice	United States	The 48-ton schooner was lost at Nome, District of Alaska.
Governor Perkins	United States	The steamer was anchored at Nome, Alaska with no crew aboard when a storm arose and the crew could not get back aboard. She parted her moorings and was wrecked.
Senator (or The Senator)	United States	The laid-up 37-gross register ton steam yacht, out of commission since 1904, burned and sank at dock in the harbor at Wickford, Rhode Island. All five people on board survived.

=== 14 July ===
List of shipwrecks: 14 July 1905
Ship	State	Description
Governor Perkins	United States	While her crew of three was ashore, the 51-foot (15.5 m) steamer was washed ashore and wrecked at Nome, District of Alaska, near the mouth of the Snake River after her mooring lines parted during a storm.
Walwarth	United States	The steamer was destroyed by fire at dock in the Illinois and Michigan Canal at Channahon, Illinois.

=== 15 July ===
List of shipwrecks: 15 July 1905
Ship	State	Description
Nimrod	United States	The schooner was sunk in a collision in thick fog with a barge towed by the steamer International (United States) off Pollock Rip Lightship. The crew were rescued by a tug.

=== 17 July ===
List of shipwrecks: 17 July 1905
Ship	State	Description
Clyde	United States	The steamer was capsized by a sudden severe wind near Minneiska, Minnesota.
Harry Brown	United States	The steamer struck a rock below Lock No. 2 in the Ohio River and sank. She was raised and repaired.

=== 18 July ===
List of shipwrecks: 18 July 1905
Ship	State	Description
A. G. Ropes	United States	The 2,460-gross register ton full-rigged ship was abandoned at sea off Kobe, Japan. All 27 people on board survived. She later was salvaged, towed to New York City, and re-documented as a schooner.
Catalina	United States	The 57-gross register ton schooner was stranded at Rockland, Maine. Both people on board survived.
L. M. Eaton	United States	The 13-gross register ton schooner burned off Point Judith, Rhode Island. The only person on board survived.
Reliance	United States	With no one on board, the 15-gross register ton motor vessel burned at Cape Charles, Virginia.

=== 19 July ===
List of shipwrecks: 19 July 1905
Ship	State	Description
A. J. Johnson	United States	The steamer struck a stump sticking out from the bank at W. M. Corbett's Mill on the Cape Fear River and sank. Later raised.

=== 21 July ===
List of shipwrecks: 21 July 1905
Ship	State	Description
USS Bennington	United States Navy	USS Bennington The Yorktown-class gunboat suffered a boiler explosion and was holed. She was beached at San Diego, California. She was later repaired and returned to service as a non-commissioned barge in 1906. the vessel was stricken in 1910.

=== 22 July ===
List of shipwrecks: 22 July 1906
Ship	State	Description
Minnivia Miles	United States	The 43-gross register ton schooner was stranded at Diamond Marsh in Virginia. All 10 people aboard survived.

=== 24 July ===
List of shipwrecks: 24 July 1905
Ship	State	Description
Barbara Hernster	United States	The 148-gross register ton two-masted schooner was wrecked at the entrance to Plover Bay inside Providence Bay near Bald Head on the east coast of Siberia.
Reef	United States	The 9-gross register ton steam screw tug burned at dock at Pontiac, Washington. The only person on board survived.

=== 25 July ===
List of shipwrecks: 25 July 1905
Ship	State	Description
Caro	United States	The 6-gross register ton motor vessel burned at Begol Island on the Mississippi River. Both people on board survived.
Gov. Perkins	United States	The 17-gross register ton screw steamer vessel was stranded at Nome, District of Alaska. All three people on board survived.
Iola May	United States	The 13-gross register ton motor paddle vessel burned at Plaquemine, Louisiana. Both people on board survived.

=== 26 July ===
List of shipwrecks: 26 July 1905
Ship	State	Description
Coryphene	United States	During a voyage from Nome to Tin City, District of Alaska, with a crew of 15 and a cargo of 1,000 tons of general merchandise, coal, and lumber aboard, the 811-gross register ton, 160.2-foot (48.8 m) bark was wrecked without loss of life 1.5 nautical miles (2.8 km; 1.7 mi) off the west-central coast of the District of Alaska 16 nautical miles (30 km; 18 mi) north of Cape Prince of Wales. By 17 August she reportedly was being dismantled during efforts to salvage her cargo.
George Presley	United States	The 2,164-gross register ton screw steamer burned in Green Bay near Washington Island, Wisconsin. The burning vessel drifted into West Harbor setting a dock on fire before sinking, a total loss. Later hull refloated, towed into Sturgeon Bay and resunk. All 15 people aboard survived.
Robert White	United States	The tug was sunk in a collision with the tug New York Central No. 15 (United States) off The Battery. Later raised.

=== 27 July ===
List of shipwrecks: 27 July 1905
Ship	State	Description
Sixeus	United Kingdom	The barque ran aground at Volunteer Point, Falkland Islands and was wrecked. Her crew were rescued. She was on a voyage from Barry, Glamorgan to Valparaíso, Chile.

=== 28 July ===
List of shipwrecks: 28 July 1905
Ship	State	Description
Barbara Hernster	United States	The 148-gross register ton motor vessel was stranded at Bald Head on the coast of Siberia. All eight people on board survived.
Martha Stevens	United States	The cargo ship was damaged in a collision with the United States Government lighter Williams (United States) off Liberty Island in New York Harbor and was beached on mud flats.

=== 29 July ===
List of shipwrecks: 29 July 1905
Ship	State	Description
Star of Russia	United States	The sailing ship ran aground in thick fog on a sand beach on the north west end of Chirikof Island. Refloated on 6 August, going to San Francisco, California for repairs.

=== 30 July ===
List of shipwrecks: 30 July 1905
Ship	State	Description
Livonia	United States	The 28-gross register ton schooner was stranded at Nauset Light on the coast of Massachusetts. All nine people on board survived.

=== Unknown date ===
List of shipwrecks: Unknown date in July 1905
Ship	State	Description
Chodoc	Flag unknown	Chodoc The passenger ship was wrecked at Cape Guardafui, Majeerteen Sultanate.
St. Donatien	France	The 1,259-ton bark sailed from Bordeaux for Adelaide, Australia on the 25 May, 1905. She vanished after making contact with a vessel on 6 July at (5°00′N 27°00′W).

== August ==
=== 2 August ===
List of shipwrecks: 2 August 1905
Ship	State	Description
Harry Reid	United States	The steamer sprung a leak and sank while lying at the bank at Winneberg, Illinois. She was raised, repaired, and returned to service.

=== 4 August ===
List of shipwrecks: 4 August 1905
Ship	State	Description
Freeman	United States	The 93-gross register ton schooner was abandoned at sea. All 10 people on board survived.
Noisiel	France	Noisiel The 400-ton steel barque was blown ashore in a violent storm at Praa Sands, Cornwall. She was en route from Cherbourg to Savona with a 600-ton cargo of armour plate from gun turrets of obsolete battleships.

=== 5 August ===
List of shipwrecks: 5 August 1905
Ship	State	Description
John J. Mitchell	United States	With no one on board, the 80-gross register ton barge was wrecked in the Yukon Flats near Fort Yukon in the central District of Alaska.
Waunetta	United States	The 6-gross register ton schooner burned in the Strait of Mackinac off Michigan. Both people on board survived.

=== 6 August ===
List of shipwrecks: 6 August 1905
Ship	State	Description
Badger	United States	The barge was stranded on Race Point on Fishers Island, New York in Long Island Sound when her tow, Bay View (United States), went ashore.
Bavaria	United States	The barge was stranded on Race Point on Fishers Island, New York in Long Island Sound when her tow, Bay View (United States), went ashore.
Bay View	United States	The Tug stranded on Race Point on Fishers Island, New York, in Long Island Sound.

=== 7 August ===
List of shipwrecks: 7 August 1905
Ship	State	Description
Hopatcong	United States	The 854-gross register ton steel-hulled sidewheel steam paddle ferry was destroyed by fire at dock at Hoboken, New Jersey. All seven people on board survived.
Sunshine	United States	The 80-foot (24 m) excursion paddle steamer rolled onto her side and sank in shallow water partially submerged in the White River near Broad Ripple, Indianapolis, Indiana when passengers rushed to one side of the vessel. One passenger drowned.

=== 8 August ===
List of shipwrecks: 8 August 1905
Ship	State	Description
Hessie	United States	The steamer sank at dock in Mayport, Florida.
Oldhamia	United Kingdom	Russo-Japanese War: The 3,639-gross register ton merchant ship's Russian prize crew ran her aground on Etorofu on or about this date and burned her. The Russian Second Pacific Squadron had captured her on 15 May 1905 off Formosa during a voyage from New York City to Hong Kong with a cargo of 165,000 cases of oil.
Post Boy	United States	The 94-gross register ton screw steamer was destroyed by fire at Holland, Michigan. Both people on board survived.

=== 10 August ===
List of shipwrecks: 10 August 1905
Ship	State	Description
Joseph B. Williams	United States	The steamer was sunk by a snag at Sisters Island near Bay City, Illinois. Raised and repaired.
Roanoke	United States	The 3,539-gross register ton four-masted bark was destroyed by fire while loading a cargo of chromium ore in Nehoue Bay near Nouméa, New Caledonia. All 30 people on board survived.

=== 11 August ===
List of shipwrecks: 11 August 1905
Ship	State	Description
Sego	United States	The steamer sank at dock at Carrabelle, Florida due to defective water tank piping. Later raised.

=== 12 August ===
List of shipwrecks: 12 August 1905
Ship	State	Description
Bertha E. Hedtler	United States	The 12-gross register ton screw naphtha launch burned at Ram Island in the Merrimack River in Massachusetts. Both people aboard survived.
George Lewis	United States	The 27-gross register ton schooner sank in the Magothy River in Maryland. All eight people aboard survived.
Joe	United States	The 119-gross register ton schooner was stranded at Bunkers Ledge on the coast of Maine. All three people on board survived.

=== 13 August ===
List of shipwrecks: 13 August 1905
Ship	State	Description
Charles W. Liken	United States	The 34-gross register ton screw steamer burned at Bay City, Michigan. All four people on board survived.
Ocmulgee	United States	The 57-gross register ton sternwheel paddle steamer sank at Durhams Bluff, Georgia. All six people on board survived.

=== 14 August ===
List of shipwrecks: 14 August 1905
Ship	State	Description
Heros	Sweden	The cargo ship, carrying copper ore and copper, went aground and sank at Rundholmen in Saltstraumen, Norway. All of the 23 men on board survived.

=== 15 August ===
List of shipwrecks: 15 August 1905
Ship	State	Description
New Shorham	United States	The steamer struck a sunken scow in the entrance to the Great Salt Pond, Rhode Island and sank.

=== 16 August ===
List of shipwrecks: 16 August 1905
Ship	State	Description
Hancock	United States	The steamer was sunk in a collision with Binghampton (United States) in Lake St. Clair.

=== 17 August ===
List of shipwrecks: 17 August 1905
Ship	State	Description
John M. Hutchinson	United States	The 980-gross register ton schooner sank in Lake Superior off Fourteen-Mile Point on the coast of Michigan. All six people on board survived.
Spartan	United States	The 1,448-gross register ton full-rigged ship was stranded at Spreckelsville on the coast of Maui in the Territory of Hawaii. All 18 people on board survived.

=== 19 August ===
List of shipwrecks: 19 August 1905
Ship	State	Description
Imogene M. Terry	United States	The 11-gross register ton sloop was stranded on the coast of New Jersey in Raritan Bay. The only person on board survived.
John Neilson	United States	The 344-gross register ton steel-hulled barge was stranded at New York City. All three people on board survived.
Minerva II	United States	The 597-gross register ton schooner was stranded on Maricobau Island in the Philippine Islands. All seven people aboard survived.
Spartan	United States	The sail cargo ship was wrecked on a shoal near Kahului, Territory of Hawaii.
William H. Vanderbilt	United States	The 241-gross register ton barge was stranded at New York City with the loss of both people on board.

=== 20 August ===
List of shipwrecks: 20 August 1905
Ship	State	Description
M. C. Haskell	United States	The 351-gross register ton schooner was stranded on Shovelful Shoal off the coast of Massachusetts with the loss of one life. There were six survivors.
Unknown	United States	The dump scow was sunk in a collision with Charles H. Hackley (United States) in the Chicago River.

=== 21 August ===
List of shipwrecks: 21 August 1905
Ship	State	Description
Excelsior	United Kingdom	The tug sprang a leak and sunk while under tow of Renown(United Kingdom) in the North Sea ten miles (16 km) south east of the Isle of May.

=== 22 August ===
List of shipwrecks: 22 August 1905
Ship	State	Description
Marion E. Rockhill	United States	The 284-gross register ton schooner was stranded in Amagansett Bay on the coast of New York. All five people on board survived.

=== 23 August ===
List of shipwrecks: 23 August 1905
Ship	State	Description
Bonanza	United States	Leaking badly after suffering ice damage in the Arctic Ocean, the 152.4-ton, 102-foot (31.1 m) schooner was beached at King Point on the coast of Herschel Island off the coast of Canada′s Yukon Territory. Ice then crushed her on the beach. Her crew of 23 survived.
Marguedora	United States	The 58-gross register ton motor yacht burned on the Carrabelle River in Florida. All three people on board survived.

=== 24 August ===
List of shipwrecks: 24 August 1905
Ship	State	Description
Hanover	United States	The 66-gross register ton sternwheel motor paddle vessel burned to the waterline at either Bethlehem, Indiana, or Louisville, Kentucky (sources disagree). All five people on board survived.
Susquehanna	United States	The 2,744-gross register ton full-rigged ship sank in the Indian Ocean at 16°51′S 062°15′E. All 27 people on board survived.
W. J. Warwick	United States	The tug capsized and sank while coaling at the Buffalo Fuel Company's dock in the Blackwell Canal in the harbor at Buffalo, New York, when too much coal was dumped on one side. One crewman was killed.

=== 25 August ===
List of shipwrecks: 25 August 1905
Ship	State	Description
Blanche	United States	The steamer was sunk in a collision with Neuse (United States) in the Neuse River.
Susquehannah	United States	The full-rigged ship was abandoned in sinking conditions in rough weather 150 miles (240 km) south west of New Caledonia in the Coral Sea. The crew reached the Solomon Islands after six days, they narrowly escaped massacre by hostile natives, escaping to sea in the boats. They were eventually rescued by an Australian vessel.
Thelma	United States	The 5-gross register ton motor vessel burned at Edgartown, Massachusetts. The only person on board survived.

=== 26 August ===
List of shipwrecks: 26 August 1905
Ship	State	Description
Charles A. Witler	United States	The 219-gross register ton schooner was lost off Diamond Shoals, North Carolina, after colliding with the steamer John Bossert (United States). All six people on board survived.
Minnehaha	United States	The 37-gross register ton schooner sank in the Chesapeake Bay off North Point, Maryland. All nine people aboard survived.

=== 27 August ===
List of shipwrecks: 27 August 1905
Ship	State	Description
Octavia	United States	The 6-gross register ton schooner was lost when she collided with an unnamed dredge at Galveston, Texas. The only person on board survived.

=== 28 August ===
List of shipwrecks: 28 August 1905
Ship	State	Description
Astonisher	United States	The 6-gross register ton catboat was lost with the loss of one life in Vineyard Sound off the coast of Massachusetts after colliding with the screw steamer Ada (Norway). There was one survivor.
Peconic	United States	The 1,855-gross register ton steel-hulled screw steamer sank in a gale off Fernandina on the northeast coast of Florida. Her master and 19 crewmen were killed. Two crewmen reached Amelia Island, Florida, in a lifeboat.

=== 29 August ===
List of shipwrecks: 29 August 1905
Ship	State	Description
Lily	United States	The steamer sheared off course, struck a wreck, and sank at Sandwich, Ontario.

=== 31 August ===
List of shipwrecks: 31 August 1905
Ship	State	Description
Bessie Smith	United States	The steamer struck an obstruction at Dam No. 2 in the Ohio River and sank. Raised and repaired.
Jones Brothers	Australia	The steam schooner, under tow of Helen Nicoll was wrecked on Oyster Bank off the harbour of Newcastle, Australia in bad weather and heavy seas.

=== Unknown date ===
List of shipwrecks: Unknown date August 1905
Ship	State	Description
Albatross	United Kingdom	The small ketch sank in the Solent when her cargo of oil barrels exploded.
Star of Russia	United States	Carrying 280 passengers, 19 crewmen, and a cargo of 28,514 cases of canned salmon, the 1,981-gross register ton, 275.5-foot (84.0 m) iron ship ran aground in fog on a sandy beach on the northwestern end of Chirikof Island in the Gulf of Alaska without loss of life. She was refloated eight days later and towed to Alitak Cannery on Kodiak Island, where her passengers disembarked and cargo was unloaded. On 26 August, she departed for repairs at San Francisco, California.

== September ==
=== 1 September ===
List of shipwrecks: 1 September 1905
Ship	State	Description
Alice S. Hawkes	United States	The 63-gross register ton schooner burned at Plymouth, Massachusetts. All 15 people on board survived.
Seven Sisters	United States	The 129-gross register ton schooner was stranded in Kotzebue Sound on the coast of the District of Alaska. All six people on board survived.
Unknown barge	United States	The barge was sunk in a collision with Manhattan (United States) in the East River off Pier 35.
Unknown launch	United States	The naptha launch was sunk in a collision with City of Hudson (United States) off Hastings-on-Hudson, New York in the Hudson River. The two people on board were rescued.

=== 2 September ===
List of shipwrecks: 2 September 1905
Ship	State	Description
America	United States	The 6-gross register ton sloop-rigged yacht was stranded at Michigan City, Indiana. The only person on board survived.
Gerome	United States	The 109-gross register ton sternwheel paddle steamer struck a rock in the Little Homely Rapids, Hornier Rapids, or Homlez Rapids (sources disagree) in the Snake River in Washington and sank. All seven people on board survived.
Iosco	United States	While towing the schooner barge Olive Jeannette (United States), the 2,051-gross register ton screw steamer sank in Lake Superior off Huron Island in Michigan's Huron Islands during a gale with the loss of all 19 people on board.
Julia	United States	The 47-gross register ton schooner barge or scow barge was stranded in the Cedar Ford River in Michigan. The only person on board survived.
Olive Jeanette	United States	While under tow by the screw steamer Iosco (United States), the 1,271-gross register ton schooner barge sank in Lake Superior off Huron Island, Michigan, during a gale. All seven people on board perished.
Pretoria	United States	The 2,790-gross register ton wooden schooner sank in a severe gale on Lake Superior off Outer Island in Wisconsin's Apostle Islands. Five of the ten people on board were lost.
Sevona	United States	The 3,166-gross register ton iron-hulled lake freighter sank in a severe gale on Lake Superior near Wisconsin's Sand Island in the Apostle Islands when she struck a reef and broke in two, a total loss. Her master and six crewmen on the forward section all died. According to one source, all 13 crewmen and three women passengers on the aft section survived using the ship′s lifeboats; another source claims that there were 11 survivors.

=== 3 September ===
List of shipwrecks: 3 September 1905
Ship	State	Description
Iosco	United States	The steamer foundered in heavy seas near the Huron Islands in Lake Superior. Lost with all 19 hands.
J. M. Colman	United States	The 463-gross register ton schooner was stranded on San Miguel Island in the Channel Islands off the coast of California. All 15 people on board survived.
Mary A. Hand	United States	The 33-gross register ton schooner was stranded in Delaware Bay on the coast of Delaware at Mahons River. Both people aboard survived.
North Wind	United States	The steamer was damaged when she struck a concrete dock entering the harbor of Duluth, Minnesota due to strong wind and current. She sprang a leak and sank.
Olive Jeannette	United States	The schooner foundered in heavy seas near the Huron Islands in Lake Superior when her tow steamer Iosco (United States) sank. Lost with all seven hands.
Young America	United States	The passenger steamer was sunk in a collision with the ferry George H. Power (United States) near the Hudson Light. Four passengers killed.

=== 4 September ===
List of shipwrecks: 4 September 1905
Ship	State	Description
Gertrude L. Trundy	United States	The 485-gross register ton schooner was abandoned at sea off Thacher Island on the coast of Massachusetts. All six people aboard survived.

=== 5 September ===
List of shipwrecks: 5 September 1905
Ship	State	Description
Cyril	United Kingdom	The Booth Line passenger-cargo liner collided near Belém, Brazil with same company's new liner Anselm(flag unknown) and sank in 70 ft (21.3 m) of water.
Shamrock	Canada	The tow steamer sank after colliding with the steamer W. C. Richardson (United States) two miles (3.2 km) above the ship canal on the St. Marys River. Her master and one crewman were killed.
Unknown scow	United States	The scow was sunk in a collision with Prinz Adalbert(Germany) off the Jersey Flats.
Vila Y. Hermano	United States	The 327-gross register ton schooner sank in the central Gulf of Mexico south of Pensacola, Florida at (29°00′N 087°00′W) after colliding with the screw steamer Mobila (United States). All six people aboard survived.

=== 7 September ===
List of shipwrecks: 7 September 1905
Ship	State	Description
Pastime	United States	The steamer sprung a leak and sank at Sewickley, Pennsylvania. Raised and repaired.

=== 9 September ===
List of shipwrecks: 9 September 1905
Ship	State	Description
Venezia	Norway	The steamer was wrecked on Tørre Bjælke. Her master, his wife and ten of the crew died.

=== 11 September ===
List of shipwrecks: 11 September 1905
Ship	State	Description
Abram Collerd	United States	The 217-gross register ton barge was lost in a collision with the screw steamer Maine (United States) at New York City. Both people on board survived.

=== 12 September ===
List of shipwrecks: 12 September 1905
Ship	State	Description
Fay S.	United States	The dredge sank in the Ohio River above Manoca, Pennsylvania.
Mikasa	Imperial Japanese Navy	The battleship sank at her moorings at Sasebo, Japan, with the loss of 251 of her crew after suffering a fire and magazine explosion. She was refloated 7 August 1907, reconstructed, and returned to service 24 August 1908.
Star	United States	The 89-gross register ton barge sank at New York City. The only person on board survived.

=== 13 September ===
List of shipwrecks: 13 September 1905
Ship	State	Description
Tempest	United States	The steamer sank at dock at Duluth, Minnesota.

=== 15 September ===
List of shipwrecks: 15 September 1905
Ship	State	Description
V. H. Ketchum	United States	The 1,699-gross register ton barge burned at Parisien Island in Lake Superior with the loss of two lives. There were six survivors.

=== 18 September ===
List of shipwrecks: 18 September 1905
Ship	State	Description
Puritan	United States	The 89-gross register ton schooner was stranded at Canso, Nova Scotia. All 12 people on board survived.

=== 19 September ===
List of shipwrecks: 19 September 1905
Ship	State	Description
George W. Roby	United States	The 1,933-gross register ton schooner barge or scow barge burned at Lime Kiln Crossing on the Detroit River in Michigan. All 17 people aboard survived.
Kirkhill	United Kingdom	The steamer was wrecked on Wolf Rocks, Falkland Islands.

=== 20 September ===
List of shipwrecks: 20 September 1905
Ship	State	Description
Sophia	United States	The 16-gross register ton screw steamer was destroyed by fire at dock in Rockport, Ontario. Crew was ashore at lunch, or three people on board survived.

=== 21 September ===
List of shipwrecks: 21 September 1905
Ship	State	Description
A. P. Co. No. 4	United States	With no one on board, the 9-gross register ton scow was stranded in the Gulf of Georgia on the coast of British Columbia.

=== 22 September ===
List of shipwrecks: 22 September 1905
Ship	State	Description
W.H. Harrison	United States	The 91-gross register ton screw steamer struck the bar in Alsea Bay entering the Alsea River on the coast of Oregon and was wrecked. All 11 people on board survived.

=== 24 September ===
List of shipwrecks: 24 September 1905
Ship	State	Description
Alabama	United Kingdom	The trawler went aground and was wrecked off Cape Wrath.
J. W. Frost	United States	The 42-gross register ton schooner was stranded at New Orleans, Louisiana. All three people on board survived.

=== 25 September ===
List of shipwrecks: 25 September 1905
Ship	State	Description
Job H. Jackson	United States	The schooner was capsized in a collision with Bay Port (United States) in Chesapeake Bay. One crewman was killed. The rest of the crew were rescued from the inverted hull by Bay Port.

=== 26 September ===
List of shipwrecks: 26 September 1905
Ship	State	Description
Cantabria	Philippine Islands	The ship sank at the north end of Ticao Island in the Philippines in a typhoon. The ship was a total loss and all 69 people on board drowned.
USS Leyte	United States Navy	The gunboat was sunk by a typhoon in the Philippines. 33 crewmen killed.
Stella Lee	United States	With no one on board, the 7-gross register ton sternwheel motor paddle vessel burned on the Ohio River at Caseyville, Kentucky.

=== 27 September ===
List of shipwrecks: 27 September 1905
Ship	State	Description
Gipsy	United States	The 293-gross register ton cargo ship, a screw steamer, was wrecked in Monterey Bay near China Point on the coast of California. All 16 people on board survived.

=== 28 September ===
List of shipwrecks: 28 September 1905
Ship	State	Description
Bridgeport	United States	The 125-gross register ton steam canal boat was lost when she collided with the screw steamer New York (United States) off Yonkers, New York. All three people on board survived.
Portsea	United Kingdom	The steamer was wrecked on Houmet Florence Reef, Alderney, Channel Islands.

=== 30 September ===
List of shipwrecks: 30 September 1905
Ship	State	Description
P. H. Birckhead	United States	The 495-gross register ton screw steamer burned at Alpena, Michigan. All 13 people on board survived.
Sprite	United Kingdom	The steamer sank in the North Sea 45 miles (72 km) south east of Hartlepool in a gale. She was caught by a cross sea and rolled left heavily and another cross sea rolled her heavily onto her starboard side, her cargo shifted prevented her from righting. An attempt to tow by trawler Buffalo was unsuccessful and Buffalo took her crew off.
Unknown launch	United States	The open naptha launch was sunk in a collision with the tug Grantham I. Taggert (United States) in the Savannah River. One occupant drowned.

=== Unknown date ===
List of shipwrecks: Unknown date September 1905
Ship	State	Description
City of Dublin	United States	The 147-gross register ton sternwheel paddle steamer was stranded at Dublin, Georgia. All 11 people on board survived.
Culdoon	Canada	The 373-ton barkentine sailed from Jacksonville, Florida, for St. Vincent, on 15 September 1905 and vanished.
Drumcraig	Canada	The 85.5-metre (281 ft) 1,969-ton bark sailed from Astoria, Oregon, for Manila, Philippines, on 22 September 1905 and vanished. An unverified message in a bottle was found 16 March, 1906 signed by a crewmember indicating she sank 130 miles west of Cape Blanco, Oregon (43°00′N 127°00′W).
Halcyon	United States	With no one on board, the 67-gross register ton schooner-rigged yacht sank in Saminar Bay on the coast of the Dominican Republic.
Laguna	Norway	The 179.5-foot (54.7 m) 471-ton schooner sailed from Pascagoula, or Moss Point, Mississippi, for Colon, Panama on the 28 September, 1905 and vanished.
Loch Vennachar	United Kingdom	The three-masted clipper ship sank at West Bay, Kangaroo Island, Australia, sometime between 6 and 29 September.
Nimrod	United States	The 99-gross register ton scow was stranded at Derby, Connecticut. The only person on board survived.

== October ==
=== 1 October ===
List of shipwrecks: 1 October 1905
Ship	State	Description
Fannie Tuthill	United States	The 27-gross register ton tug was sunk in a collision with the screw steamer D. C. Whitney (United States) on the St. Clair Flats Canal in the Detroit, Michigan, area. One crewman was killed. There were three survivors. Wreck was removed.

=== 2 October ===
List of shipwrecks: 2 October 1905
Ship	State	Description
Ella	United States	The barge sank in Rancocas Creek in southwestern New Jersey. Her master was killed.
Lawrence Haines	United States	The 256-gross register ton schooner, under tow of Emma J. Kennedy (United States), was lost when she collided with the sidewheel paddle steamer Nantasket (United States) off College Point, Queens, New York. All five people on board survived.
Nantasket	United States	The sidewheel paddle steamer was sunk in a collision with the schooner Lawrence Haines (United States) off West Farms Creek in the East River in New York City.

=== 4 October ===
List of shipwrecks: 4 October 1905
Ship	State	Description
Lettie May	United States	The 45-gross register ton schooner was stranded at Skilligalee Light on the coast of Michigan. Both people on board survived.

=== 5 October ===
List of shipwrecks: 5 October 1905
Ship	State	Description
HMS Irresistible	Royal Navy	The Formidable-class battleship ran aground at Malta. She was refloated, underwent an overhaul, and returned to service.
Kingfisher	United States	The 517-gross register ton schooner was stranded at Cleveland, Ohio. All six people on board survived.
Noquebay	United States	The wooden schooner caught fire and sank in Lake Superior off the coast of Stockton Island, in Chequamegon Bay on the coast of Wisconsin.
Pearl	United States	The 76-gross register ton schooner was lost when she collided with an unidentified vessel in the Chesapeake Bay. All three people on board survived.
St. Paul	United States	The 2,440-gross register ton iron-hulled screw steamer was wrecked in fog on a reef at Point Gorda on the coast of California. All 61 people on board survived. The wreck was destroyed by fire on 10 November during operation to salvage material from the wreck.

=== 6 October ===
List of shipwrecks: 6 October 1905
Ship	State	Description
Belle of Dover	United States	The 38-gross register ton schooner sank in Pamlico Sound on the coast of North Carolina. Both people on board survived.
USLHS Manzanita	United States Lighthouse Service	The Manzanita-class lighthouse tender was sunk in a collision with the dredge Columbia near Waterford Post Light in the Columbia River.
Unknown launch	United States	The anchored naptha launch was sunk when struck by passenger vessel Kennebec (United States) at Fall River, Massachusetts.
Van Name and King	United States	The 735-gross register ton schooner sank at sea with the loss of six of the eight people aboard.

=== 7 October ===
List of shipwrecks: 7 October 1905
Ship	State	Description
Dea	Netherlands	The 140.0-foot (42.7 m) barque sank in the North Sea. The crew were picked up by the trawler Parramatta (United Kingdom) on 10 October.
Rosalie	United Kingdom	The steamer was wrecked off Carameiro Rock, Corcubion.

=== 8 October ===
List of shipwrecks: 8 October 1905
Ship	State	Description
Admiral	United States	The 35-gross register ton motor fishing vessel was wrecked in the Yukon River at Andreafsky, District of Alaska. All eight people on board survived.
Noquebay	United States	The 684-gross register ton schooner caught fire and was beached in Julian Bay near Presque Isle Point, Stockton Island on the coast of Michigan. All six people on board survived.
Veteran	United States	The 14-gross register ton schooner was stranded at Herring Ledge on the coast of Maine. All four people aboard survived.

=== 10 October ===
List of shipwrecks: 10 October 1905
Ship	State	Description
Berkley	United States	The 223-gross register ton barge sank at New Haven, Connecticut. Both people on board survived.
H. P. Barnes	United States	The 30-gross register ton schooner was stranded. Both people on board survived.

=== 11 October ===
List of shipwrecks: 11 October 1905
Ship	State	Description
Charles H. Burton	United States	The 514-gross register ton schooner was stranded at Westfield, New York. All six people on board survived.
John McCausland	United States	The 33-gross register ton screw steamer caught fire off Turkey Point, New York. She was beached and was destroyed by the fire. Both people on board survived.
May Flower	United States	The 8-gross register ton schooner was stranded at Solomon on the Bering Sea coast of the District of Alaska. All six people aboard survived.
Thomas B. Travers	United States	The 38-gross register ton schooner was stranded at Tangier Beach, Virginia. Both people aboard survived.

=== 12 October ===
List of shipwrecks: 12 October 1905
Ship	State	Description
Corwin H. Spencer	United States	The 1,609-gross register ton sidewheel paddle steamer was destroyed by fire at Ivory Station, Missouri, just south of the St. Louis city limits, while being painted, a total loss. All 22 people on board survived.

=== 13 October ===
List of shipwrecks: 13 October 1905
Ship	State	Description
Argosy	United Kingdom	The steamer ran ashore in the North Sea two miles (3.2 km) south east of Donna Nook, Lincolnshire. A tug pulled her off on 29 October.
Elk	United States	The 100-gross register ton paddle steamer struck an obstruction in the Mississippi River at Vicksburg, Mississippi, and sank. Using a line, she was partially pulled onto the riverbank between Vicksburg and Davis Bend, Mississippi, with her stern in 30 feet (9.1 m) of water. There were 13 people on board; sources differ as to whether they all survived or four crewmen were killed.
John Reilly	United States	During a voyage from Keewalik to Kotzebue, District of Alaska, with a crew of six and a cargo of ten tons of general merchandise aboard, the 200- or 220-gross register ton (sources disagree), 100-foot (30.5 m) sternwheel paddle steamer, a cargo vessel, was wrecked without loss of life in Kotzebue Sound on the beach four nautical miles (7.4 km; 4.6 mi) east of Cape Blossom.

=== 14 October ===
List of shipwrecks: 14 October 1905
Ship	State	Description
Laura Madsen	United States	The 345-gross register ton, 140-foot (42.7 m) schooner was crushed by ice at Point Barrow, District of Alaska, six weeks after being trapped there by the ice. All eight people on board survived.

=== 15 October ===
List of shipwrecks: 15 October 1905
Ship	State	Description
Edward	United States	The 319-gross register ton barge burned in the Chesapeake Bay off Wolf Trap Light off the coast of Virginia. The only person on board survived.
Louisville	United States	The steamer sank at dock at Pinners Point, probably in the Norfolk, Virginia area.
Sacramento	United States	The 130-gross register ton schooner was stranded on the Coos Bay Bar on the coast of Oregon. All five people on board survived.

=== 16 October ===
List of shipwrecks: 16 October 1905
Ship	State	Description
HMS A4	Royal Navy	The A-class submarine was sunk in a collision, or a flooding accident. She was refloated, and either repaired and returned to service, or not repaired and not recommissioned.
Unknown boat	United States	The boat filled and sank at the Capitol City Oil Mill, Baton Rouge, Louisiana.
Valencia	United States	Carrying a crew of 62, three passengers, and 500 tons of general cargo on a voyage from Nome, District of Alaska, the 1,598-gross register ton, 252.7-foot (77.0 m) passenger steamer ran aground without loss of life while entering the harbor at Saint Michael, District of Alaska. After Valencia jettisoned 75 tons of cargo, the tug Meteor (United States) helped her free herself and she resumed her voyage.

=== 17 October ===
List of shipwrecks: 17 October 1905
Ship	State	Description
May Fisher	United States	The 52-gross register ton sternwheel paddle steamer sank at Baton Rouge, Louisiana. All seven people on board survived.

=== 18 October ===
List of shipwrecks: 18 October 1905
Ship	State	Description
Alvin A. Turner	United States	The 309-gross register ton screw steamer was going through Little Detroit Passage on the St. Marys River in Michigan when her wheel chains parted, resulting in her losing steering and grounding on rocks. She then caught fire and was destroyed. All nine people on board survived.
Louise	United States	The 126-gross register ton screw steamer was stranded near Pointe à la Hache, Louisiana. All 13 people on board survived.
Nautilus	United States	The yacht was destroyed by fire at dock at Fishers Island, New York.

=== 19 October ===
List of shipwrecks: 19 October 1905
Ship	State	Description
Cygnet	United States	The 12-gross register ton screw steamer was stranded in the Straits of Mackinac. All four people on board survived.
D. R. Rhodes	United States	The vessel, in a gale on Lake Huron, lost her tow ship, Joseph S. Fay, eventually wrecking on rocks near Cheboygan, Michigan.
Elizabeth	United States	The 25-gross register ton schooner barge or scow barge was lost when she struck a pier at Menominee, Michigan. Both people on board survived.
Iver Lawson	United States	The 149-gross register ton schooner was stranded at Horse Shoe Bay, Wisconsin. All four people on board survived.
Joseph S. Fay	United States	The 1,220-gross register ton screw steamer, a wooden bulk carrier, was on a voyage from Escanaba, Michigan, fto Ashtabula, Ohio, with a cargo of iron ore when she sprung a leak on Lake Huron during a gale and either was beached or driven onto the rocks at Forty Mile Point on the coast of Michigan, where she broke up with the loss of one life. There were 13 survivors. Her wreck lies in 17 feet (5.2 m) of water at 45.488611°N 83.91°W.
Kaliyuga	United States	The 1,941-gross register ton screw steamer foundered on Lake Huron in a gale. Lost with all 17 hands.
Kate Lyons	United States	The 201-gross register ton schooner was stranded at Holland, Michigan. All four people on board survived.
Louise	United States	The steamer's hull was holed on the Mississippi River 42 miles (68 km) below New Orleans, Louisiana. She rolled to port and sank, a total loss.
Nautilus	United States	The 24-gross register ton steam yacht burned at Fishers Island, New York, at the eastern end of Long Island Sound. All five people on board survived.

=== 20 October ===
List of shipwrecks: 20 October 1905
Ship	State	Description
Alta	United States	The 935-gross register ton lumber schooner barge was stranded in Lake Superior on Grand Island, Michigan near Trout Bay with a broken back, a total loss. All six people on board survived.
Dora	United States	The 177-gross register ton schooner departed Charleston, South Carolina, bound for New York City with five people on board and was never heard from again.
Florence	United States	During a voyage from Nome to Unalakleet, District of Alaska, with a crew of three aboard, the 10-gross register ton, 40-foot (12.2 m) schooner was wrecked on a bar 7 nautical miles (13 km; 8.1 mi) north of Egavik (or Egowik) (64.0403°N 160.9225°W) during a gale with the loss of her captain. Her other two crew members survived.
Galatea	United States	The 610-gross register ton schooner was stranded at Grand Marais, Michigan, a total loss. All six people aboard survived.
Jay Ochs	United States	The 18-gross register ton screw steamer sank in Lake Huron 3.5 nautical miles (6.5 km; 4.0 mi) south-southwest of Middle Isle. All five people on board survived.
John V. Jones	United States	The 200-gross register ton schooner was stranded 35 miles (56 km) northeast of Milwaukee, Wisconsin, with the loss of two lives. There were three survivors.
Mautenee	United States	The 647-gross register ton schooner barge or scow barge was stranded at Pictou, Ontario. All six people aboard survived.
Minnedosa	Canada	While under tow with a cargo of grain during a snowstorm, the schooner barge disappeared and sank in Lake Huron near Harbor Beach, Michigan.
Nirvana	United States	The 611-gross register ton schooner barge or scow barge broke up and sank in ten feet (3.0 m) of water at Grand Marais, Michigan. All six people on board survived.
Sara Sheldon (or Sarah E. Sheldon)	United States	The 693-gross register ton screw steamer sprung a leak in heavy seas on Lake Erie and was beached 600 yards (550 m) off the coast of Ohio 6 nautical miles (11 km; 6.9 mi) east of Lorain. A strong wind turned into a gale and broke her up. The gale capsized one of her lifeboats, killing two crewmen. Two tugs rescued the other 12 members of her crew.
Siberia	United States	The 1,892-gross register ton screw steamer sprung a leak in heavy seas and her machinery became disabled in Lake Erie about 30 miles (48 km) west of Long Point, Ontario. She was assisted by the steamer J. H. Wade (United States) and was pushed close to shore off Long Point, where she sank in 22 feet (6.7 m) of water. All 15 people aboard survived. She was broken up by another gale before she could be raised.
Tasmania	United States	The 979-gross register ton schooner sank in Lake Erie south of Pelee Passage Light on the coast of Ontario, with the loss of all eight people on board. Wreck dispersed with Dynamite on 13 July 1906.
Vega	United States	The 200-gross register ton schooner was stranded at Ludington, Michigan. All four people aboard survived.
Yukon	United States	The 1,602-gross register ton schooner sank in Lake Erie 3 nautical miles (5.6 km; 3.5 mi) north of the piers at Ashtabula, Ohio. All eight people aboard survived.

=== 22 October ===
List of shipwrecks: 22 October 1905
Ship	State	Description
Post Boy	Australia	The schooner was lost in Spencer Gulf.

=== 23 October ===
List of shipwrecks: 23 October 1905
Ship	State	Description
Hudson	United States	The tug was caught between Huron and Ramapo(both United States) and was sunk in Buffalo Creek, Buffalo, New York. One crewman killed.

=== 24 October ===
List of shipwrecks: 24 October 1905
Ship	State	Description
May Flower	United States	The 8-gross register ton schooner was stranded at Solomon on the Bering Sea coast of the District of Alaska. All six people aboard survived.

=== 25 October ===
List of shipwrecks: 25 October 1905
Ship	State	Description
James D. Leary	United States	The 76-gross register ton steam screw tug burned in Newark Bay on the coast of New Jersey, a total loss.. All six people on board survived.
Ogarita	United States	Ogarita The 604-gross register ton wooden schooner barge burned and sank in 30 feet (9.1 m) of water in Lake Huron off the coast of Michigan north of Thunder Bay Island at 45.105433°N 83.21795°W. All six people on board survived.

=== 26 October ===
List of shipwrecks: 26 October 1905
Ship	State	Description
Deudraeth Castle	United Kingdom	The barque was abandoned off Cape Horn, Chile. Her crew were rescued by Pass of Killicrankie(United Kingdom). Deudraeth Castle was on a voyage from South Shields, County Durham to Carrizal Bajo, Chile.

=== 28 October ===
List of shipwrecks: 28 October 1905
Ship	State	Description
Alpha	United States	The 33-gross register ton sloop was lost off New York City after colliding with the screw steamer Seneca (United States). The only person on board survived.
Cardenal Cisneros	Spanish Navy	The Princesa de Asturias-class armored cruiser sank in the Atlantic Ocean off Ferrol, Spain, without loss of life after striking rocks on the Meixidos shoal.
Esther	United States	The 16-gross register ton steam yacht was destroyed by fire at East St. Louis, Illinois, or Ivory Station, Missouri, according to different sources. All six people on board survived.
Kentucky	United States	The 43-gross register ton schooner was stranded at Sargentville, Maine. The only person on board survived.

=== 30 October ===
List of shipwrecks: 30 October 1905
Ship	State	Description
Nettie	United States	The 94-gross register ton sternwheel paddle steamer struck a drifting log and sank at Little Rock, Arkansas. All 11 people on board survived.

=== 31 October ===
List of shipwrecks: 31 October 1905
Ship	State	Description
Zelandia	Belgium	The steamer was wrecked off Warkworth, England.

=== Unknown date ===
List of shipwrecks: Unknown date October 1905
Ship	State	Description
Dania	Denmark	The 172-ton vessel sailed from Port of Hull on the 4 October, 1905 and vanished.
Mayaguez	United States	With no one on board, the 9-gross register ton screw steamer sank at Ponce, Puerto Rico.
Northwest	United States	The 7-gross register ton schooner was stranded in East Moran Bay on the coast of Michigan. Both people on board survived.

== November ==
=== 1 November ===
List of shipwrecks: 1 November 1905
Ship	State	Description
Idella	United States	The 6-gross register ton sloop was stranded in Narragansett Bay off Seaconnet Point on the coast of Rhode Island. Both people on board survived.
R. J. Wilson	United States	With no one on board, the 272-gross register ton scow sank off Bridgeport, Connecticut.

=== 2 November ===
List of shipwrecks: 2 November 1905
Ship	State	Description
Appomattox	United States	The 2,643-gross register ton wooden screw steamer ran aground in smoke and fog on the coast of Lake Michigan at North Point near Milwaukee, Wisconsin. All 18 people on board survived. She was declared a constructive total loss and abandoned. Machinery and boilers salvaged in 1919.

=== 3 November ===
List of shipwrecks: 3 November 1905
Ship	State	Description
Bavarian	United Kingdom	The steamer was wrecked on Wye Rock, Grosse Ile, Quebec. Refloated in November 1906. Broken up at Quebec in 1907.
Manitou	United States	The 333-gross register ton schooner sank in Lake Ontario off Scotch Bonnet Light on Scotch Bonnet Island off the coast of Ontario. All six people on board survived.

=== 4 November ===
List of shipwrecks: 4 November 1905
Ship	State	Description
Anglo Saxon	United States	The 14-gross register ton, 46-foot (14.0 m) inland motor towing steamer was wrecked at Chiniak on the District of Alaska's Kodiak Island. Both men on board lost their lives. She was deemed a total loss, but nonetheless was salvaged, repaired, and returned to service.
Mayflower	United States	The 14-gross register ton, 34.6-foot (10.5 m) schooner was wrecked and abandoned in the District of Alaska at a place described in the wreck report as on Kalsinsia Reef in Chignik Bay west of the Semendi Islands at 56°30′N 158°30′W. Conflicting information in various reports make it unclear whether the wreck took place in Chignik Bay on the south coast of the Alaska Peninsula or on Kalsin Reef in Chiniak Bay in the Kodiak Archipelago near Kodiak.

=== 5 November ===
List of shipwrecks: 5 November 1905
Ship	State	Description
Blackadder	Norway	The clipper ship foundered off Bahia, Brazil.
Grace Virginia	United States	The 75-gross register ton sternwheel paddle steamer burned to the waterline and sank in the Ohio River at New Matamoras, Ohio. Both people on board survived.

=== 7 November ===
List of shipwrecks: 7 November 1905
Ship	State	Description
Margery (or Marjorie or Marjory)	United States	The 10-gross register ton, 35-foot (10.7 m) schooner was driven ashore and wrecked in a gale on the south-central coast of the District of Alaska, either on the east side of Sanborn Harbor (55°10′N 160°04′W) or in Eagle Harbor on the western shore of Nagai Island in the Shumagin Islands, according to different reports. Her crew of two survived.

=== 8 November ===
List of shipwrecks: 8 November 1905
Ship	State	Description
Abbie	United States	The 87-gross register ton schooner sank at Portage Lake Harbor of Refuge in Michigan. All three people on board survived.

=== 9 November ===
List of shipwrecks: 9 November 1905
Ship	State	Description
Emma	United States	The steamer caught fire in the Great Wicomico River and she was scuttled to extinguish the fire.

=== 10 November ===
List of shipwrecks: 10 November 1905
Ship	State	Description
May M	United States	The 41-gross register ton motor vessel burned at Ipswich, Massachusetts. All three people on board survived.
Nellie Coleman	United States	The 160-gross register ton schooner departed Squaw Harbor on the District of Alaska's Unga Island bound for Seattle, Washington, with 12 people aboard and was never heard from again.

=== 12 November ===
List of shipwrecks: 12 November 1905
Ship	State	Description
Elheurah	United States	The barge was sunk in a collision with Powhatan (United States) near Pomham Light in the Providence River. The crew were saved by a boat from the barge Ira A. Allen. Later raised.
Ira A. Allen	United States	The 199-gross register ton barge was sunk in a collision with the screw steamer Powhatan (United States) near Pomham Light in the Providence River in Rhode Island. The crew of two abandoned ship in a lifeboat and survived. She later was raised.
R. J. Hackett	United States	The 1,129-gross register ton screw steamer caught fire and was either abandoned or deliberately run aground on Whaleback Reef off Washington Island in Green Bay on the coast of Wisconsin and sank. All 13 or 14 (sources disagree) crew members were rescued by the steamer Stewart Edward (United States).

=== 13 November ===
List of shipwrecks: 13 November 1905
Ship	State	Description
B. W. Parker	United States	The 1,476-gross register ton schooner sank off Cleveland, Ohio. All eight people aboard survived.
Mary Ann	United States	The 102-gross register ton, 88.3-foot (26.9 m) cod-fishing schooner was wrecked during a gale in the harbor at Unga, District of Alaska. Her entire crew of four or 10 (sources disagree) survived.
Nellie Mason	United States	The 554-gross register ton schooner was stranded at Cleveland, Ohio. All six people on board survived.

=== 14 November ===
List of shipwrecks: 14 November 1905
Ship	State	Description
Point Abino	United States	The 204-gross register ton screw steamer sprung a leak in Lake St. Clair or the St. Clair Flats Canal in Michigan (sources disagree) and was beached. All eight people on board survived, but she was a total loss.

=== 15 November ===
List of shipwrecks: 15 November 1905
Ship	State	Description
Anna Tardy	United States	The 71-gross register ton sternwheel paddle steamer was lost when she struck a snag in the Red River of the South at Miggs Ferry, Louisiana. All 14 people on board survived.
Bug	Imperial Russian Navy revolutionary	1905 Russian Revolution: The torpedo boat was shelled and sunk by Czarist Russian warships at Sevastopol. Later salvaged.
No. 270	Imperial Russian Navy revolutionary	1905 Russian Revolution: The torpedo boat was shelled and sunk by Czarist Russian warships at Sevastopol. Later salvaged.
Svirepyy	Imperial Russian Navy revolutionary	1905 Russian Revolution: The torpedo boat was shelled and sunk by Czarist Russian warships at Sevastopol. Later salvaged.

=== 16 November ===
List of shipwrecks: 16 November 1905
Ship	State	Description
Frank Pendelton	United States	The anchored barge was sunk in a collision with Kershaw (United States) in the harbor of Norfolk, Virginia off Lamberts Point.
Hornstein	Germany	The cargo vessel struck a rock on Savo Reef, near Faro, and was lost.
Widgeon	United States	The 16-gross register ton schooner was stranded on Block Island off the coast of Rhode Island. All three people aboard survived.

=== 17 November ===
List of shipwrecks: 17 November 1905
Ship	State	Description
SMS S126	Imperial German Navy	The S126-class destroyer sank with the loss of 33 lives after being cut in two in a collision with the light cruiser SMS Undine (Imperial German Navy). The two halves were salvaged in 1906, and she was repaired and recommissioned in 1908.

=== 18 November ===
List of shipwrecks: 18 November 1905
Ship	State	Description
Hilda	United Kingdom	Hilda The steamship ran aground on La Pierre des Portes reef, Saint-Malo, France with the loss of 125 lives.

=== 20 November ===
List of shipwrecks: 20 November 1905
Ship	State	Description
Katie Flickinger	United States	The 472-gross register ton barkentine was stranded at Redondo Beach, California. All nine people on board survived.
Maud M. Story	United States	The 75-gross register ton schooner was stranded at Sambro, Nova Scotia. All 14 people aboard survived.

=== 21 November ===
List of shipwrecks: 21 November 1905
Ship	State	Description
Fairhope	United States	The 93-gross register ton screw steamer burned at Fairhope, Alabama. All six people aboard survived.
Pasadena	United States	The 596-gross register ton schooner was stranded at Fernandina, Florida. All seven people on board survived.

=== 22 November ===
List of shipwrecks: 22 November 1905
Ship	State	Description
Agnes T. Parks	United States	The steamer burned to the waters edge at Lowry, Louisiana.
Rebecca	United States	The tow steamer ran into Pier 70 South, Philadelphia, Pennsylvania and was run into by the scow she was towing causing her to careen over and sink. The vessel was scheduled to be raised.
Unnamed	United States	The wharf boat, built from the hull of Mayflower sank at Nashville, Tennessee. Wreck removal started in late 1906 as a hazard to navigation continuing well into 1907.

=== 23 November ===
List of shipwrecks: 23 November 1905
Ship	State	Description
HMS Forte	Royal Navy	Serving as a coal hulk, the decommissioned screw frigate was destroyed by an accidental fire at Sheerness.

=== 24 November ===
List of shipwrecks: 24 November 1905
Ship	State	Description
Argo	United States	The steamer ran aground attempting to enter the Harbor at Holland, Michigan in a gale. 19 passengers and 11 of 22 crew taken off by the United States Life Saving Service, the rest deciding to remain on board. She was scuttled on 27 November to prevent further damage. Pulled off by tugs in January 1906.
Gem	United States	The 13-gross register ton screw steamer was stranded on Spectacle Island in Boston Harbor on the coast of Massachusetts. Both people on board survived.
Golden Ray	United States	The 58-gross register ton schooner sank off Plum Gut, New York. All three people on board survived.
Harvey Bissell	United States	The wooden schooner barge was in ballast when she ran aground in Lake Huron off the coast of Michigan between Presque Island and Thunder Bay Island. She later was refloated.
Progress	United States	The 1,596-gross register ton screw steamer was stranded at Green Bay, Wisconsin. All 16 people on board survived.
Spirit	United States	The tug struck an obstruction at Duluth, Minnesota, and sank. She later was raised.

=== 25 November ===
List of shipwrecks: 25 November 1905
Ship	State	Description
Bella	United States	The 180-gross register ton schooner was stranded at Ocean Beach, Oregon. All six people on board survived.
Pargo	United States	The 25-gross register ton schooner burned at Cape Sable, Florida. All three people on board survived.

=== 27 November ===
List of shipwrecks: 27 November 1905
Ship	State	Description
Charles E. Sears	United States	The 180-gross register ton schooner was stranded at Chatham, Massachusetts. All four people on board survived.
Monkshaven	Canada	The steamer stranded on Pie Island in Lake Superior. Refloated in August 1906.

=== 28 November ===
List of shipwrecks: 28 November 1905
Ship	State	Description
Amboy	United States	Mataafa Storm: The sailing barge was driven ashore and wrecked in a severe wind and snow storm on Lake Superior seven miles (11 km) east of Duluth, Minnesota after being cut loose by her tow George Spencer (United States).
Bransford	United States	Mataafa Storm: The steamer was stranded on a reef in a severe wind and snowstorm off Isle Royale on Lake Superior. Later refloated.
Cornelia	United States	Mataafa Storm: The steamer was driven ashore at Point Isabelle.
Crescent City	United States	Mataafa Storm: The steamer was driven ashore and wrecked in a severe wind and snow storm on Lake Superior at Thomasville, Minnesota.
D. C. Whitney	United States	Mataafa Storm: The steamer was driven ashore in a severe wind and snow storm on Lake Michigan just south of Port Washington, Wisconsin. Later refloated and towed to Milwaukee.
George Herbert	United States	Mataafa Storm: The 362-gross register ton scow was stranded at Two Islands, Minnesota, with the loss of three lives. There were nine survivors.
George Spencer	United States	Mataafa Storm: The 1,360-gross register ton screw steamer was driven ashore in a severe wind and snowstorm on Lake Superior at Thomasville, Minnesota, seven miles (11 km) east of Duluth, Minnesota. All 12 people on board survived.
Harvey Bissell	United States	Mataafa Storm: The 496-gross register ton schooner sank in Thunder Bay on the coast of Michigan. All six people on board survived.
Ira H. Owen	United States	Mataafa Storm: The 1,753-gross register ton iron-hulled screw steamer sank in Lake Superior off the Apostle Islands in a severe wind and snowstorm. All 17 people on board survived, or all 19 died.
Isaac L. Ellwood	United States	Mataafa Storm: The steamer struck two docks entering harbor at Duluth, Minnesota due to high seas and current and sank.
J. H. Outhwaite	United States	Mataafa Storm: The 1,304-gross register ton steam screw bulk carrier was driven ashore and wrecked, breaking in two in a severe wind and snowstorm in the Straits of Mackinac at Little Point Sable near Cheboygan, Michigan. She then was destroyed by fire. All 14 people on board survived.
J. M. Spaulding	United States	Mataafa Storm: The 71-gross register ton schooner barge or scow barge was stranded at Fort Gratiot, Michigan. All four people on board survived.
Lafayette	United States	Mataafa Storm: The 5,113-gross register ton iron-hulled screw steamer was driven ashore in a severe wind and snowstorm on Encampment Island on Lake Superior and broke in two. Either all 26 people survived or one crewman was killed, according to different sources. The vessel was a total loss. The aft section was salvaged in 1906 and towed to Howard's Bay and beached. She was possibly burned in a major conflagration in November, 1907 that destroyed another beached ship nearby, and was scrapped in 1908 with the engine placed in another ship.
Madeira	United States	Rigging on the wreck of Madeira, 7 September 2007 Mataafa Storm: After her towing vessel, the steamer William Edenborn (United States), cut her loose during a blizzard on Lake Superior, the 5,039-gross register ton iron-hulled schooner-barge was driven ashore on Gold Rock, north of Split Rock Lighthouse on the coast of Minnesota, and broke up. One crewman was killed. Her 10 survivors were rescued by the tug Edna G.two days later.
Maia	United States	Mataafa Storm: The barge, under tow by Cornelia (United States), was driven ashore at Point Isabelle.
Majestic	United States	The tow steamer burned and sank at dock at Burlington, New Jersey.
Manila	United States	Mataafa Storm: The barge, being towed by Lafayette (United States), was driven ashore driven ashore in a severe wind and snowstorm on Encampment Island on Lake Superior when she went ashore. Later refloated and repaired at Toledo, Ohio.
Mary Mitchell	United States	Mataafa Storm: The schooner was driven ashore and wrecked in a severe wind and snow storm on Lake Superior at Point Nipigon near Cheboygan, Michigan after being cut loose by her tow J. H. Outhwaite (United States).
Mataafa	United States	The wreck of SS Mataafa Mataafa Storm: The bulk carrier was wrecked in a severe wind and snow storm on Lake Superior just outside the harbor at Duluth, Minnesota. Trying to enter the harbor she struck bottom losing steerage, then hit a pier. After that they tried to take her back out into the lake but the engine quit causing her to ground 700 yards (640 m) offshore where she broke in two. All nine crewman on the aft section died. Fifteen survivors on the forward section were rescued after 20 hours. She was refloated on 1 June 1906, repairs finished on 3 December 1906 and returned to service.
Niobe	United Kingdom	The steamer was sunk in a collision with Gregory(United Kingdom) at Le Havre, France.
R. W. England	United States	Mataafa Storm: The steamer was driven ashore in a severe wind and snow storm on Lake Superior near Minnesota Point. One crewman killed. Pulled off by tugs on 1 December.
Unknown scow	United States	The scow, under tow by Ivanhoe (United States), capsized and sank in the dumping grounds off the lightship for New York Harbor. Only person on board drowned.
Urbain Belliveau	Canada	The schooner was wrecked near Port George, Nova Scotia.
Vega	United States	Mataafa Storm: In a severe wind and snowstorm on Lake Michigan, the 2,143-gross register ton iron-hulled screw steamer was driven ashore and wrecked on rocks on South Fox Island in the Fox Islands off Michigan, where she broke in two and was pounded to pieces by the surf. All 15 people on board survived.
William Edenborn	United States	Mataafa Storm: The steamer was driven ashore in a severe wind and snow storm on Lake Superior near Split Rock, Minnesota. One crewman killed when he fell into the hold when the ship stranded.
William E. Corey	United States	Mataafa Storm: The steamer was driven ashore in a severe wind and snow storm on Lake Superior on Gull Island in the Apostle Islands. Pulled off by tugs on 10 December.

=== 29 November ===
List of shipwrecks: 29 November 1905
Ship	State	Description
Chas. Stewart Parnell	United States	The 1,739-gross register ton screw steamer burned at Squaw Island in Lake Michigan. All 17 people on board survived.
Coralia	United States	The steamer stranded on Point Isabelle on Lake Superior in a gale.

=== 30 November ===
List of shipwrecks: 30 November 1905
Ship	State	Description
Delawanna	United States	While under tow by the steamer Scranton (United States), the 698-gross register ton schooner barge foundered 8 nautical miles (15 km; 9.2 mi) southeast of Minots Ledge Light in Massachusetts Bay. Four crew, three men and a woman, died. One was rescued.
Father and Sons	United States	The 16-gross register ton schooner was stranded at Harbor Island, North Carolina. The only person on board survived.

=== Unknown date ===
List of shipwrecks: Unknown date November 1905
Ship	State	Description
Aqua	United Kingdom	The 3,045-ton cargo vessel departed Barry, England on 25 November and vanished. A lifeboat, a body and debris was found near Eddystone.
Florida	Germany	The 3,440-ton cargo vessel departed departed Singapore for Vladivostok on 9 November and vanished.
Nellie Coleman	United States	Carrying her captain, his wife, 20 crewmen, perhaps as many as eight passengers, and a cargo of 65,000 codfish, the 160-gross register ton, 97-foot (29.6 m) cod-fishing schooner departed Squaw Harbor (55.2433°N 160.5533°W), District of Alaska, bound for Seattle, Washington, sometime between 7 and 10 November and was never seen again. Fifteen bodies washed ashore at Cape Yakataga on the Alaskan coast later in November, and a mentally ill Frenchman on Unimak Island in the Aleutian Islands was discovered wearing a dress that had belonged to the captain′s wife.
Scott	United Kingdom	The 908-ton cargo vessel departed Moji, Japan on 5 November and vanished. Probably sank in a typhoon shortly after departure.
Tregea	United Kingdom	The 98-foot (30 m) 158-ton schooner sailed from Glasgow, for Lannion, Brittany, France on the 13th of November, 1905 and vanished.

== December ==
=== 1 December ===
List of shipwrecks: 1 December 1905
Ship	State	Description
Laynesville	United States	The laid up steamer sank at the mouth of the Big Sandy River. Later raised.

=== 2 December ===
List of shipwrecks: 2 December 1905
Ship	State	Description
Dreadnaught	United States	The 13-gross register ton schooner sank in St. Andrew Sound on the coast of Georgia. The only person on board survived.
Thomas A. Goddard	United States	The 643-gross register ton schooner barge or scow barge was stranded at Nags Head, North Carolina. All 10 people aboard survived.

=== 3 December ===
List of shipwrecks: 3 December 1905
Ship	State	Description
Twilight	United States	The steamer was wrecked when she, and a loaded tow, went over the dam at Lock No. 2 near Pittsburgh, Pennsylvania.

=== 4 December ===
List of shipwrecks: 4 December 1905
Ship	State	Description
Gladys	United States	The 60-gross register ton sternwheel paddle steamer vessel was lost when she struck a wharf at Frankfort, Kentucky. All five people on board survived.

=== 5 December ===
List of shipwrecks: 5 December 1905
Ship	State	Description
J. Duvall	United States	The 311-gross register ton schooner was lost when she collided with the screw steamer James B. Colgate (United States) at Farsons Island, Ontario. All five people on board survived.

=== 6 December ===
List of shipwrecks: 6 December 1905
Ship	State	Description
Arthur II	United States	The 16-gross register ton schooner burned at Keansburg, New Jersey. Both people aboard survived.

=== 7 December ===
List of shipwrecks: 7 December 1905
Ship	State	Description
Rosalie	United States	The steamer caught fire at dock at the foot of Fifty-Sixth street, Brooklyn. The fire was put out by USAT McClellan ( United States Army) with assistance from the New York City Fire Department, but the water swamped her and she sank.

=== 8 December ===
List of shipwrecks: 8 December 1905
Ship	State	Description
Lizzie Bay	United States	The steamer sank in seven feet (2.1 m) of water in a collision with a coal fleet at Ludlow, Kentucky.
Robert Bruce	United States	The 47-gross register ton sternwheel motor paddle vessel was destroyed by fire in Bayou Lafourche 6–7 miles (9.7–11.3 km) below Lockport, Louisiana. All six people on board survived.

=== 10 December ===
List of shipwrecks: 10 December 1905
Ship	State	Description
Ariete	Spanish Navy	The Ariete-class torpedo boat was destroyed by fire in the drydock at the Carraca Arsenal, at Cádiz, Spain.
Maine	United States	The 7-gross register ton sloop was stranded at Napeague, New York. The only person on board survived.
Rayo	Spanish Navy	The Ariete-class torpedo boat was destroyed by fire in the drydock at the Carraca Arsenal, at Cádiz, Spain.
Zillah	United States	The 18-gross register ton motor vessel was destroyed by fire at dock at Port Bolivar, Texas, due to a lamp exploding. All three people on board survived.

=== 11 December ===
List of shipwrecks: 11 December 1905
Ship	State	Description
LV-58 Nantucket	United States Lighthouse Service	While being towed into port, the 121-foot (37 m), 449-gross register ton lightvessel sprang a leak and sank off the coast of Massachusetts south of Nantucket, probably in about 150 feet (46 m) of water. Her entire crew of 13 survived.

=== 12 December ===
List of shipwrecks: 12 December 1905
Ship	State	Description
Mount Pleasant	United States	The 20-gross register ton motor vessel burned at Plantation Key in Florida. All three people on board survived.
Ofelia	United States	The 11-gross register ton schooner was lost when she collided with an unnamed barge in Galveston Bay on the coast of Texas. The only person on board survived.

=== 13 December ===
List of shipwrecks: 13 December 1905
Ship	State	Description
Pepe Ramirez	United States	The 450-gross register ton schooner departed New York City bound for Brunswick, Georgia, with eight people on board and was never heard from again.

=== 14 December ===
List of shipwrecks: 14 December 1905
Ship	State	Description
Rose Hite	United States	The steamer was sunk, along with an unnamed coal flat, in a collision with John F. Klein (United States) in the Monongahela River near Thompson's Landing, Pennsylvania. Four crewmen killed.
Sun	United States	The packet ship struck a snag in Mobile Bay on the coast of Alabama and sank. She was refloated and repaired.

=== 15 December ===
List of shipwrecks: 15 December 1905
Ship	State	Description
Bath	United States	The 1,192-gross register ton iron-hulled barge sank off Cape Charles on the coast of Virginia with the loss of all six people on board.
Pendleton Sisters	United States	The 798-gross register ton schooner was stranded at Chincoteague, Virginia, with the loss of one life. There were six survivors.

=== 16 December ===
List of shipwrecks: 16 December 1905
Ship	State	Description
Alert	United States	The screw steamer sank in a collision with an unnamed car float being towed by the steamer Transfer No. 7 (United States) off Blackwells Island in Hell Gate in the East River in New York City. All 10 people transferred to the Float.
Edward L. Mayberry	United States	The 656-gross register ton bark sank in the North Atlantic Ocean at 36°08′N 071°14′W. All nine people on board survived.
Gladys	United States	The steamer foundered at dock at Frankfort, Kentucky.
Guy Hunter	United States	The 56-gross register ton sidewheel paddle steamer struck an obstruction and either sank or was stranded (sources disagree) in nine feet (2.7 m) of water in Lake Maurepas in Louisiana. All nine people on board survived.
Jessie Bill	United States	The steamer's caulking in her seams was damaged by ice and she sank at La Grange, Illinois. Raised, repaired, and returned to service.

=== 17 December ===
List of shipwrecks: 17 December 1905
Ship	State	Description
Thomas J. Yorke Jr.	United States	The tug sank at dock at East Boston, Massachusetts due to a valve being left open. Immediately raised.

=== 19 December ===
List of shipwrecks: 19 December 1905
Ship	State	Description
Amelia M. Price	United States	The 58-gross register ton schooner was lost in the Chesapeake Bay off Point No Point, Maryland, with the loss of one life after colliding with the screw steamer Baltimore (United States). There were two survivors.
P. R. R. 704	United States	The 196-gross register ton barge was lost when she struck a pier at Elizabethport, New Jersey. The only person on board survived.

=== 20 December ===
List of shipwrecks: 20 December 1905
Ship	State	Description
Pirate	United States	During a voyage from Eagle Harbor (57°25′34″N 152°43′16″W) on Kodiak Island to Pirate Cove (55°21′40″N 160°21′50″W) on Popof Island in the Shumagin Islands carrying a crew of either two or four (sources disagree) and a cargo of 20 tons of salted codfish, the 20-gross register ton, 45.4-foot (13.8 m) scow schooner was wrecked without loss of life during a snow squall on a rocky point at Red Bluff (55°17′30″N 160°26′30″W) in Pirate Cove.
Portland	United States	The steamer was stranded on Spire Island Reef in the District of Alaska.

=== 21 December ===
List of shipwrecks: 21 December 1905
Ship	State	Description
Baker	United States	The 996-gross register ton schooner barge or scow barge burned in the North Atlantic Ocean off Atlantic City, New Jersey. All three people on board survived.
Coot	United States	With no one on board, the 11-gross register ton sloop-rigged yacht burned at North Haven, Maine.
John W. Thomas	United States	The steamer was caught in a severe windstorm at Tell City, Indiana blowing her into an object that broke in her side and she sank. During an attempt to raise her she caught fire and everything above water burned.
Pioneer	United States	The motor vessel sprung a leak in harbor at Love Point, Maryland and was beached.

=== 23 December ===
List of shipwrecks: 23 December 1905
Ship	State	Description
Fannie Reiche	United States	The 463-gross register ton schooner was lost when she collided with the schooner Martha E. Wallace (United States) off Winter Quarter Light, Virginia. All seven people on board survived.
Jennie Stella	United States	The 292-gross register ton schooner was stranded on the coast of Mexico near Barra de Navidad. All seven people on board survived.

=== 24 December ===
List of shipwrecks: 24 December 1905
Ship	State	Description
C. H. Moore	United States	The 17-gross register ton schooner was stranded at Southern Beach, Virginia. All three people on board survived.
Shetland	United States	The 643-gross register ton bark was stranded on Cabo Corrientes on the western end of Cuba. All 10 people on board survived.
Westover	United States	The freighter grounded on Executive Rock in Long Island Sound. Refloated by a wrecking company on 1 January 1906.

=== 25 December ===
List of shipwrecks: 25 December 1905
Ship	State	Description
Breton	France	The 137-gross register ton cargo steamer was wrecked on the Pont d'Yeu rocks, between Notre-Dame-de-Monts and the Île d'Yeu, on a voyage from Bordeaux to Nantes.
Coimbatore	Norway	The 1,122-ton barque was sunk in a collision with barque "Zanita" (flag unknown) 207 miles west southwest of Cape Leeuwin, Western Australia (35°50′S 111°15′E). One crewman survived by jumping on board Zanita.
Nokomis	United States	The 295-gross register ton schooner sank in the Gulf of Mexico at 28°00′N 88°00′W. All five people on board survived.

=== 26 December ===
List of shipwrecks: 26 December 1905
Ship	State	Description
Unknown	United States	The dumper, under tow by John Fleming (United States), sank in a collision with the schooner Bessie Whiting (United States) in the lower bay of the harbor of New York City.

=== 27 December ===
List of shipwrecks: 27 December 1905
Ship	State	Description
Challenger	United States	The 1,456-gross register ton bark caught fire on 6 December was stranded or scuttled on the coast of Japan at Minabe Bay. Was a total loss by 11 January 1906. All 15 people on board survived.

=== 28 December ===
List of shipwrecks: 28 December 1905
Ship	State	Description
Argo	United Kingdom	The steamer was wrecked on rocks at Meary Voar.
Unknown canal boat	United States	The canal boat, under tow by Coleraine (United States), sank in a collision with the tug S. O. Co. No. 3 (United States) off Bayonne, New Jersey.

=== 29 December ===
List of shipwrecks: 29 December 1905
Ship	State	Description
Unknown barge	United States	The barge, under tow of the tug Pavonia (United States), sank as a result of a collision between Pavonia and the tug Castalia (United States) in the Ohio River at Paducah, Kentucky.

=== 31 December ===
List of shipwrecks: 31 December 1905
Ship	State	Description
Baden	United States	The 1,128-gross register ton iron-hulled barge was stranded at Buzzards Bay, Massachusetts, with the loss of all six people on board. Work to remove the wreck started 21 November 1906 and finished 19 January 1907.
Pluvier	United Kingdom	The 89.8-foot (27.4 m) 120-ton schooner sailed from Figueira, Portugal for Portmadoc, in ballast, on 24 December 1905 and was wrecked in Rennies Bay, County Cork, Ireland in a gale, with the loss of all five crew.
Roberta	United States	The 94-gross register ton sternwheel paddle steamer sank in the Red River of the South at Grand Ecore, Louisiana, with the loss of two lives. There were 13 survivors.

=== Unknown date ===
List of shipwrecks: Unknown date December 1905
Ship	State	Description
Athos	United Kingdom	The 1,947-ton cargo vessel departed "Sydney, C.B." on 28 December for Genoa and vanished.
Girl of Devon	United Kingdom	The 104.9-foot (32.0 m) 130-ton schooner sailed from Herring Neck, Newfoundland, for Lisbon, on the 19th of December, 1905 and vanished.
Gloria	Germany	The 232-ton auxiliary schooner cargo vessel departed Middlesburg on 30 December and vanished.
Golden Era	United Kingdom	The 261-ton fishing vessel departed the Icelandic fishing grounds on 19 December for home and vanished.
Pride of the South	United Kingdom	The 110-ton schooner departed Holyhead 27 December and vanished.
Scentilla	Canada	The 100-ton schooner departed Gibraltar on 29 December and vanished.
Valparaiso	Norway	The 188.5-foot (57.5 m) 742-ton barque sailed from Porsgrund, Norway on the 23 December, 1905 and vanished.
Willie	United States	With no one on board, the 16-gross register ton schooner sank in Trinity Bay on the coast of Texas.

== Unknown date ==
List of shipwrecks: Unknown date 1905
Ship	State	Description
Arctic Bird	United States	The 38-gross register ton, 50-foot (15.2 m) sternwheel paddle steamer was wrecked on the Karluk River in the District of Alaska. Some of her machinery was salvaged.
Bohemia No. 1	United States	The lighter was lost at Naknek, District of Alaska.
Francis Alice	United States	The 131-gross register ton two-masted schooner was wrecked in the Bering Sea and was declared a total loss. Her crew of six survived.
Francis Allen	United States	The schooner was lost in the Bering Sea.
George W. Elder	United States	The passenger-cargo ship struck a rock in the Columbia River and sank. She was refloated, repaired, and returned to service.
Myrtle Sawyer	United States	The 224.8-foot (68.5 m) four-masted schooner was abandoned at sea in a gale in the North Atlantic Ocean off the United States East Coast. She was recovered, towed to Savannah, Georgia, and returned to service.
White Rose	United States	The steamer filled with water and sank at Gramercy, Louisiana sometime in late 1905. The vessel not raised by the end of 1906.
William and John	United States	The schooner was lost at Cape Saint Elias in the District of Alaska.
