= Joseph Fay =

Joseph Fay may refer to:

- Joseph Fay (artist), German painter and illustrator
- Joseph Fay (politician), American politician, militia officer, and businessman in Vermont

== See also ==
- Joseph S. Fay Shipwreck Site
