= SS L.R. Doty =

Great Lakes steamship lost in Lake Michigan

Coordinates: 42°33′40″N 87°20′12″W

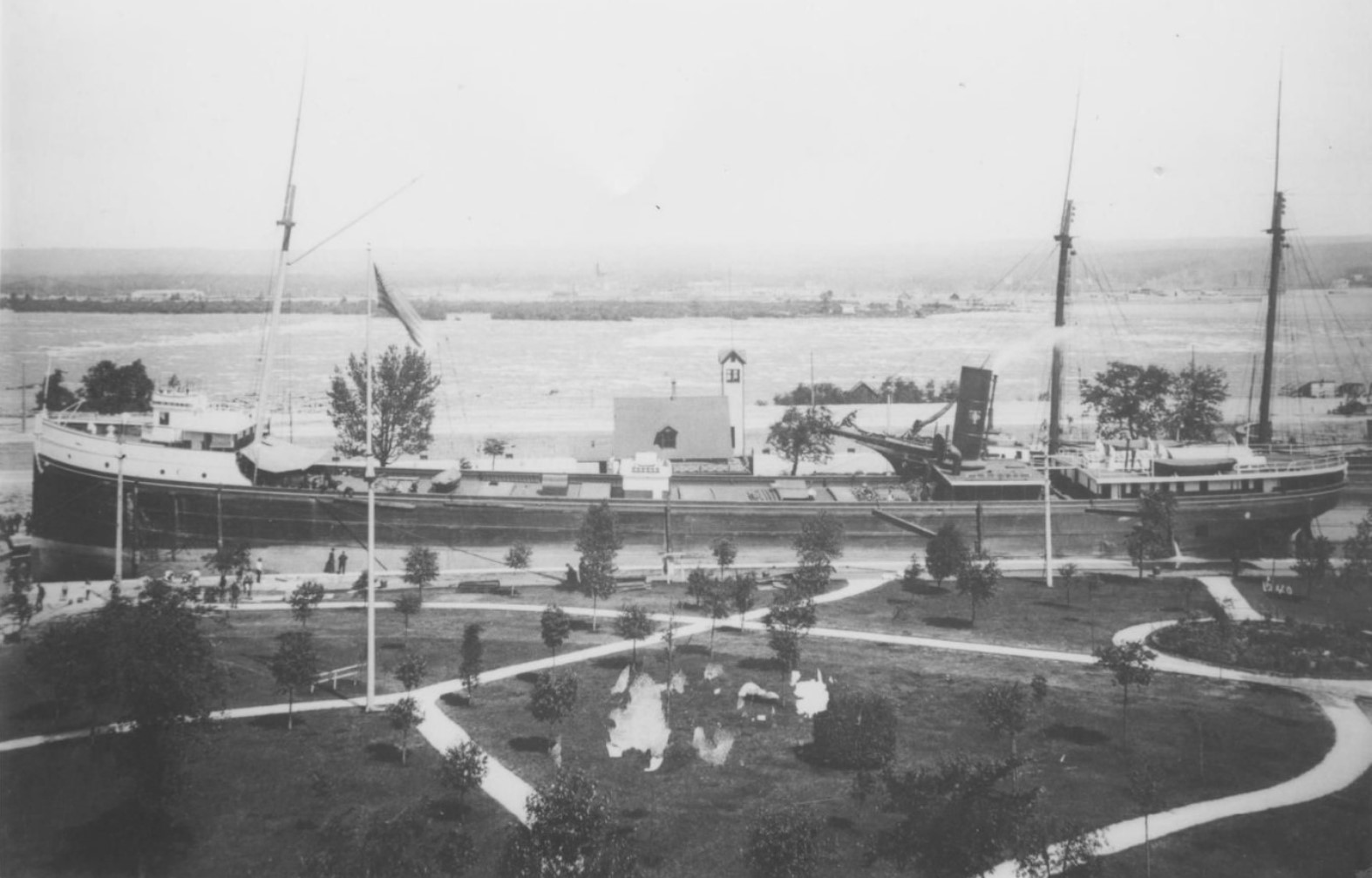

History

United States
- Name: L.R. Doty
- Namesake: Lucius Ramsey Doty
- Owner: Cuyahoga Transit Company, Ohio
- Builder: F.W. Wheeler, Bay City, Michigan
- Launched: 1893
- Fate: Sank, October 25, 1898

General characteristics
- Length: 312 ft (95 m) LOA; 291 ft (89 m) LBP
- Beam: 41 ft (12 m)
- Depth: 20 ft (6.1 m)
- Propulsion: 3-cylinder triple expansion steam engine; 1,000 hp (746 kW); Single shaft
- Crew: 17

L.R. Doty was a Great Lakes steamship launched in May 1893 at West Bay City, Michigan. It was last seen afloat October 25, 1898 north of Milwaukee, Wisconsin, during a violent storm on Lake Michigan, with winds reaching 70 miles per hour (110 km/h). The ship was witnessed foundering at the stern by a passenger of the four-masted schooner Olive Jeanette which was being towed by the Doty until the tow line broke from the force of the storm. Seventeen crew members died.

On June 25, 2010, 112 years after her loss, divers found the Doty 300 feet (91 m) below the surface of Lake Michigan with its cargo of corn still intact. The first divers to reach and film the Doty were Tracy Xelowski, John Scoles and John Janzen.

Coincidentally, seven years later on September 30, 1905, the L.R. Doty's sister ship the Iosco also sank while towing the Olive Jeanette. However, on this occasion both vessels were lost to the waters of Lake Superior.

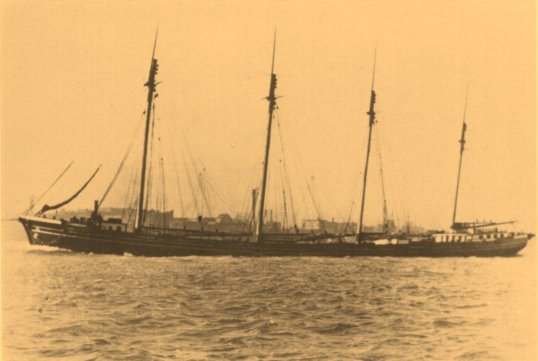
Olive Jeanette (in 1890)

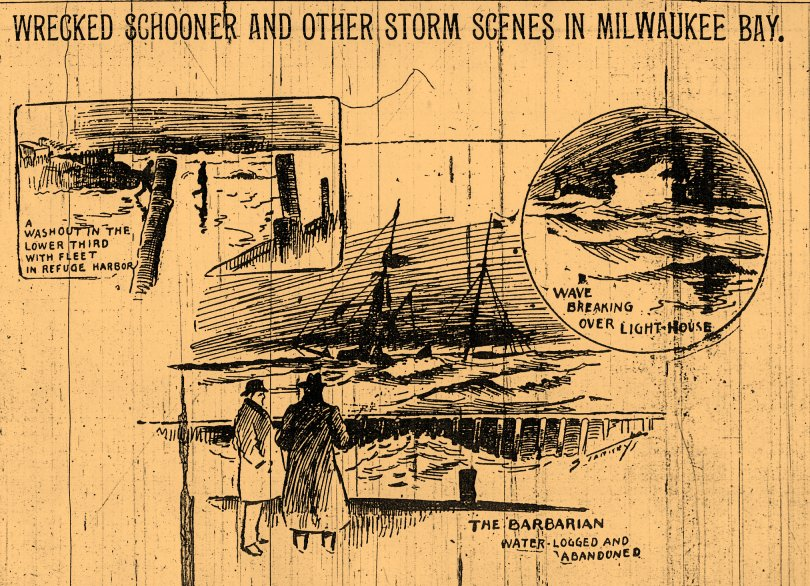
The Storm in the Milwaukee Sentinel on October 26, 1898
