= SS Iosco =

Great Lakes freighter that sank in Lake Superior

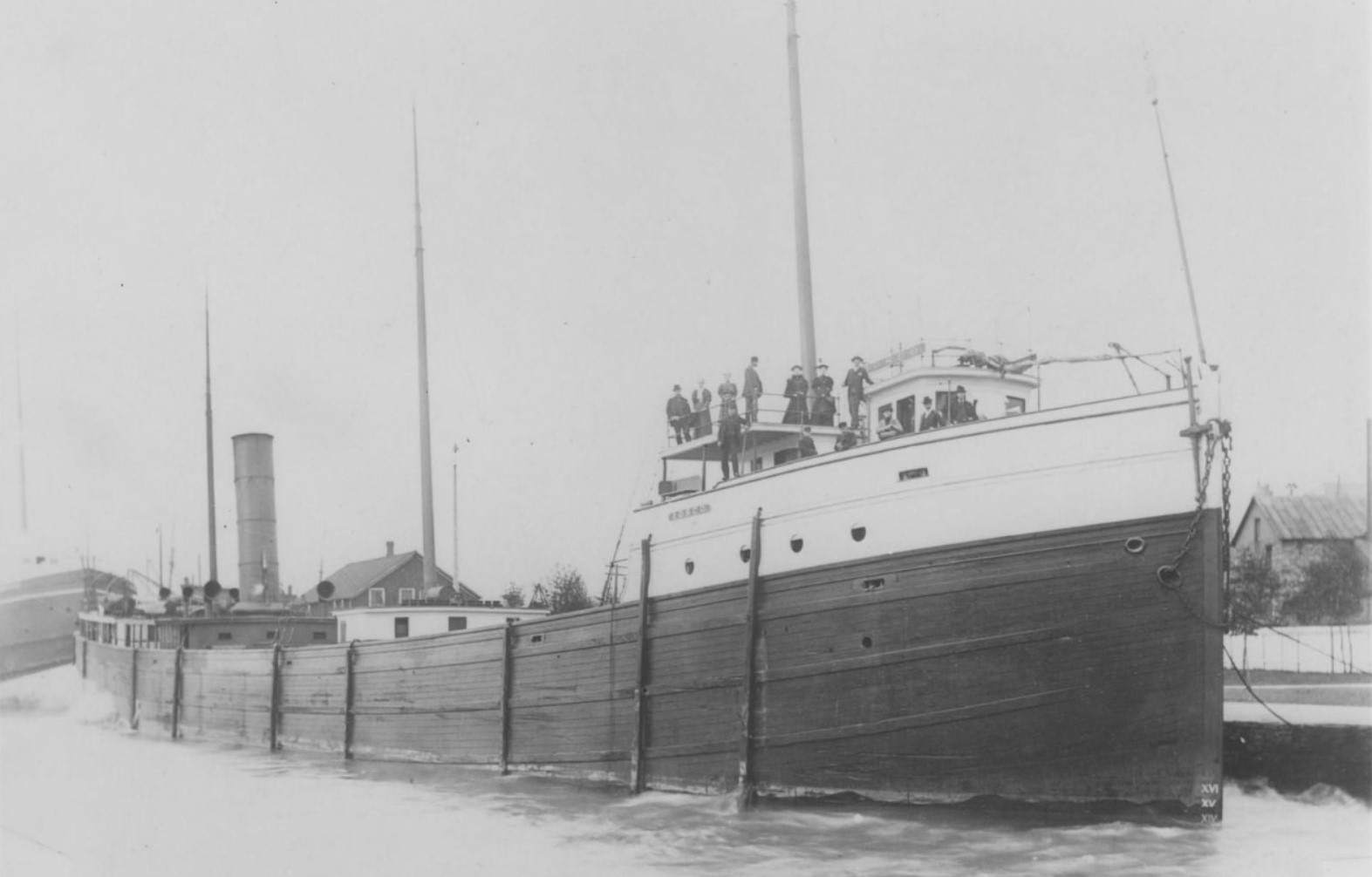
- Iosco prior to her sinking

History

United States
- Name: Iosco
- Namesake: Iosco County, Michigan
- Operator: W.C. Penoyar 1891–1895; Smith Transit Company 1895–1905
- Port of registry: United States, Rockport, Ohio
- Builder: F.W. Wheeler & Company, West Bay City, Michigan
- Yard number: 80
- Launched: April 25, 1891
- Completed: 1891
- In service: May 11, 1891
- Out of service: September 2, 1905
- Identification: U.S. Registry #100484
- Fate: Lost with all hands off Huron Island, Lake Superior

General characteristics
- Type: Lake freighter
- Tonnage: 2,051.8 GRT; 1,706.83 NRT
- Length: 312 feet (95 m) LOA 291 ft (89 m) LBP
- Beam: 41 feet (12 m)
- Height: 20 feet (6.1 m)
- Installed power: 2 × Scotch marine boilers
- Propulsion: 3-cylinder triple expansion steam engine; 1,000 hp (746 kW)
- Crew: 19

Iosco (Official number 100484) was a Great Lakes freighter that served on the Great Lakes from her construction in 1891 to her foundering on September 2, 1905, when she and her tow, the schooner barge Olive Jeanette sank on Lake Superior. While Olive Jeanette's wreck was located in over 300 feet (91 m) of water about eight miles (13 km) off the Huron Islands in the 1990s, Iosco's wreck has not yet been found.

== History ==
Iosco was built by the West Bay City Shipbuilding Company (F.W. Wheeler Shipyards) of West Bay City, Michigan. She was named after Iosco County, which is a county in Michigan. She was one of three almost identical wooden ships including Tampa, William F. Sauber, Uganda, C.F. Bielman and L.R. Doty. She was launched on April 25, 1891, as hull number #80. She had a large white oak hull.

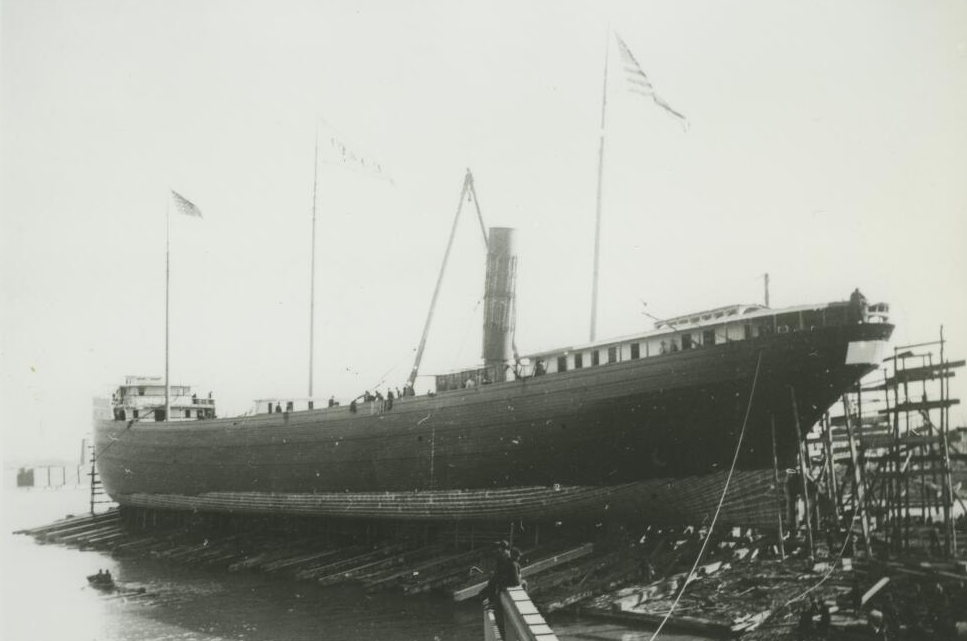
Iosco on the ways

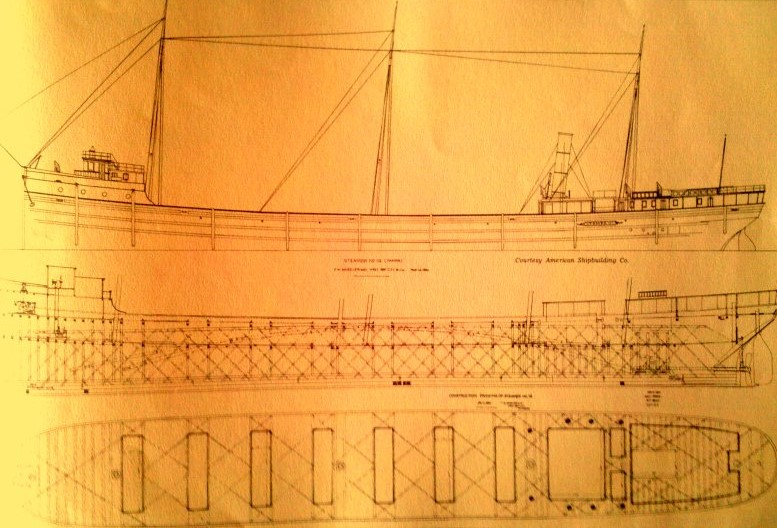
Hull plans for Iosco's sister ship, Tampa

At an overall length of 312 feet (95 m), Iosco was one of the largest wooden ships ever built. Her hull was 291 feet (89 m) between her perpendiculars, her beam was 41 feet (12 m) wide, and her cargo hold was 20 feet (6.1 m) deep. Because of her enormous size Iosco needed several steel arches, a steel keelson, steel cross bracing and several steel plates to increase her strength. Iosco had a three-cylinder triple expansion steam engine that was built by the Frontier Engine Works Company of Detroit, Michigan. Her massive triple expansion steam engine was capable of generating 1,000 hp (746 kW), her engine had cylinders of 20, 32.5 and 55 inches (51, 83 and 140 cm), each with a 42-inch (110 cm) stroke. She had two coal burning Scotch marine boilers that were 12 feet (3.7 m) high and 11.75 feet (3.58 m) wide. They also had a steam pressure of 167 pounds per square inch (1,150 kPa); her boilers were built by the Wickes Brothers of Saginaw, Michigan.

== Sinking ==
A September 6, 1905 issue of the Daily News Marshall, Michigan wrote an article about the foundering of Iosco and Olive Jeanette:

"Pequaming, Mich., Sept. 6. -- The steamer Iosco will have to be added to the list of ships which foundered on Lake Superior in the great gale last Sunday, if the story told be the wreckage through which the tug D.L. Hebard passed Tuesday is well founded.

Life preservers marked Iosco and much other wreckage were found near Huron Island. The stem of a schooner had been thrown up on the end of Point Abbaye. The body of a sailor was found ten miles this side of Point Abbaye.

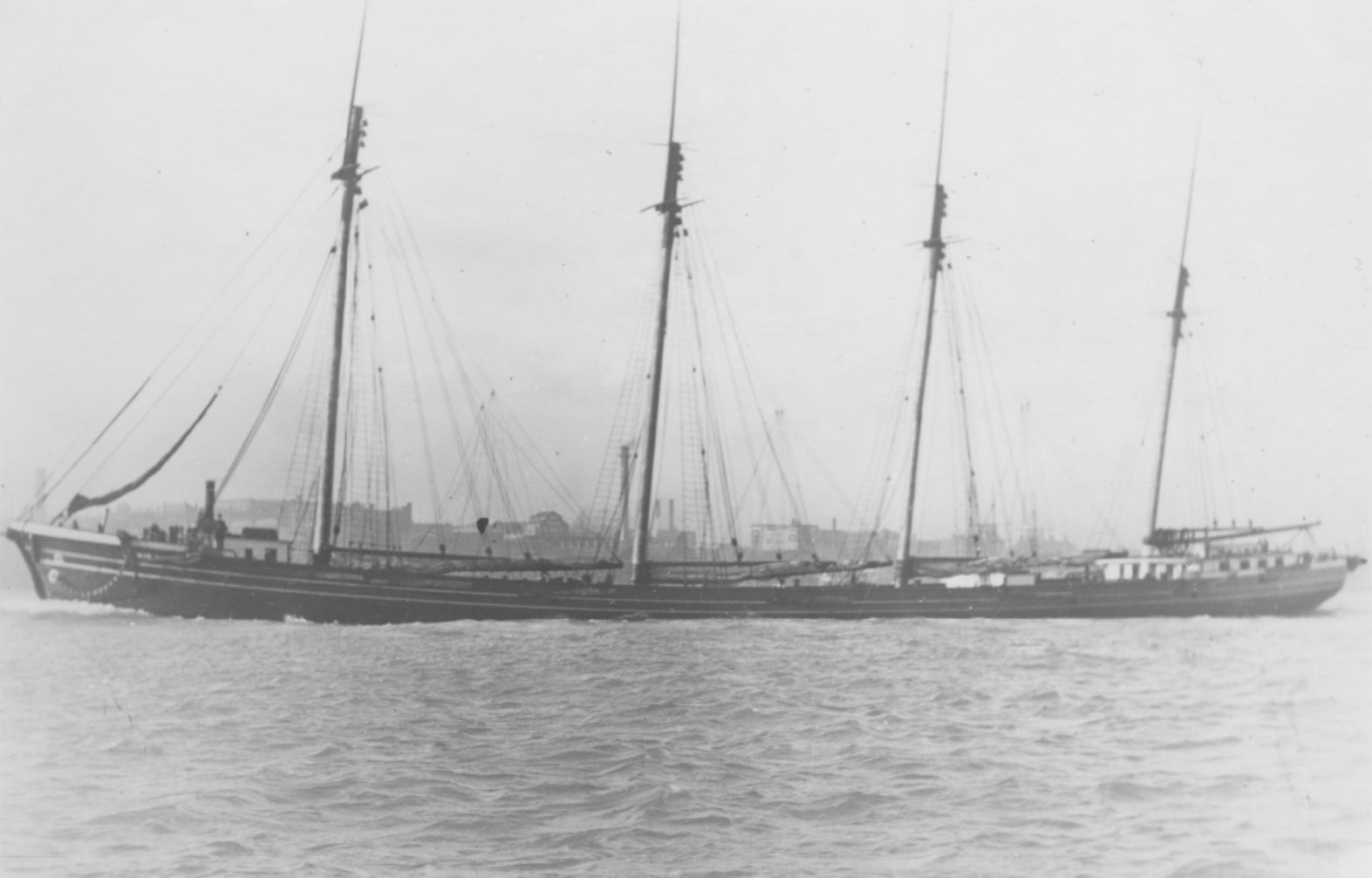
Olive Jeanette underway

It is now believed that both the Iosco and the schooner Olive Jeannette, which the Iosco had in tow, foundered in the vicinity where the wreckage had been sighted. It is certain that the Olive Jeanette is lost. The lighthouse keeper on Huron Island plainly saw a big schooner founder four miles north of the light at 4 o'clock Sunday afternoon. No steamer was in sight at the time. The schooner when first sighted had jib and foresail set, and was nearly waterlogged. Not long afterward the ship went down. The lighthouse keeper had no means of rendering assistance in the tremendous sea running. The three days which have elapsed since the Olive Jeannette foundered would have brought news from the Iosco were that boat still afloat, but the owners at Cleveland last night gave up hope. The Iosco carried a crew of nineteen men. The Olive Jeannette carried a crew of seven men. The Iosco and Jeannette, laden with iron ore, left Duluth at noon last Thursday bound for Lake Erie. They were caught by the storm when halfway down Lake Superior, and must have been driven back with the hope of finding shelter among the islands east of Keweenaw Peninsula. The Iosco was commanded by Captain Nelson Gonyaw."
