= Noquebay =

Wooden schooner barge that sank in Lake Superior

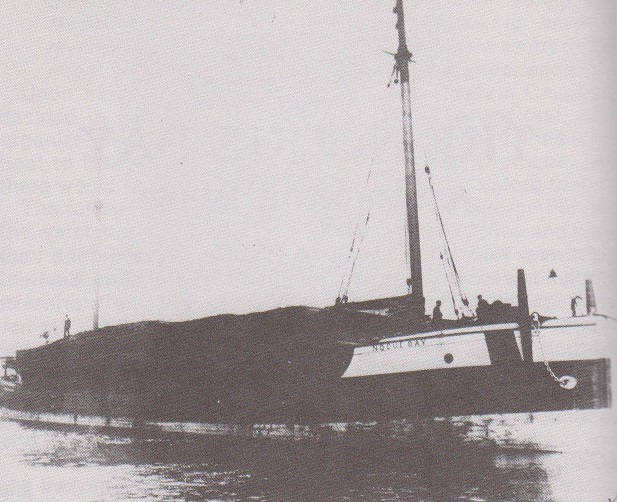
- Noquebay, loaded with lumber.

History
- Name: Noquebay
- Owner: T.H. Madden, of Bay City, Michigan
- Port of registry: United States
- Builder: Built in Trenton, Michigan, in 1872
- Launched: 1872
- Fate: Burned October 9, 1905
- Status: The burned wreckage remains at the bottom of Julian Bay off Stockton Island.
- Notes: Location: 46°55.568′N 90°32.717′W

General characteristics
- Type: Originally built as a schooner, later converted into a towable barge
- Tonnage: 684 tons
- Length: 205 feet (62 m)
- Propulsion: none
- Noquebay (Schooner-Barge) Shipwreck Site
- U.S. National Register of Historic Places
- Nearest city: La Pointe, Wisconsin
- NRHP reference No.: 92000593
- Added to NRHP: June 4, 1992

Noquebay was a wooden schooner barge that sank in Lake Superior in Chequamegon Bay off Stockton Island. The wreck site was added to the National Register of Historic Places in 1992.

== History ==
Noquebay was built in 1872. Although originally built as a schooner, she later was modified for use as a towable barge for hauling lumber. Noquebay, along with another ship named Mautenee, was towed by the steamship Lizzie Madden. T. H. Madden, operator of the Madden Company, owned all three vessels.

On October 3, 1905, the Comstock and Wilcox Company of Ashland, Wisconsin, loaded Noquebay with 600,000 board-feet of hemlock lumber. There she waited six days for Mautenee and Lizzie Madden to return from Duluth, Minnesota. On the morning of October 9, the three vessels pulled away from nearby Bayfield, Wisconsin, heading to Buffalo, New York, to deliver their cargo. Shortly after their departure, a fire was discovered aboard Noquebay. The fire apparently started in the compartment containing the donkey boiler.

Because the fire was too severe to extinguish, the crew threw some cargo overboard to save it, and jumped from the burning ship. All of them climbed safely aboard Lizzie Madden. There was nothing Lizzie Madden could do but abandon the burning ship and continue on the journey towing Mautenee. When they reached the Soo Locks at Sault Ste. Marie, Michigan, they wired ahead to Buffalo, then contacted Ashland with the news.
