= SS W. C. Richardson =

Two merchant ships have been named SS W. C. Richardson.

- SS W. C. Richardson (1902), US propeller, bulk freighter, Official No. 818167.
- SS W. C. Richardson (1908), built as Wainwright, US propeller, bulk freighter, Official No. 818167.
