= Joseph S. Fay Shipwreck Site =

- U.S. National Register of Historic Places
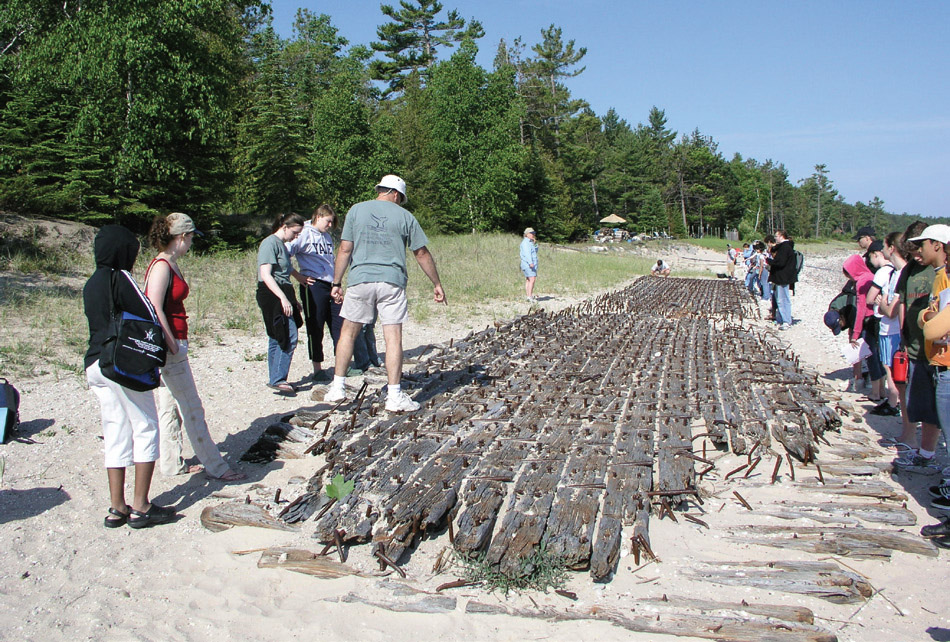
- The beached remains of the wooden steamer Joseph S. Fay

- Location within Michigan Location within the United States
- Location: Off of Forty Mile Point Light in Lake Huron
- Nearest city: Rogers City, Michigan
- Coordinates: 45°29′19″N 83°54′36″W
- NRHP reference No.: 100001838
- Added to NRHP: February 8, 2018

The Joseph S. Fay was a wooden steamer built in 1871 Quayle and Martin at Cleveland, Ohio. At the time of launch, the Fay was the largest ship ever built in Cleveland.

== Description ==
The ship was 216 feet long, with a beam of 34 feet and a gross tonnage of 1221 tons. It has a single screw propeller powered by a 28.5" by 36" direct acting high-pressure steam engine manufactured by Cleveland's Cuyahoga Iron Works, and twin tubular boilers measuring 6'10" by 17'3". In 1887, the engine was upgraded to a steeple compound steam engine and single Scotch boiler. The Fay had a two-level aft cabin situated above the engine room and a pilothouse atop the forecastle. She had three masts used as an auxiliary propulsion system.

== History of the ship ==
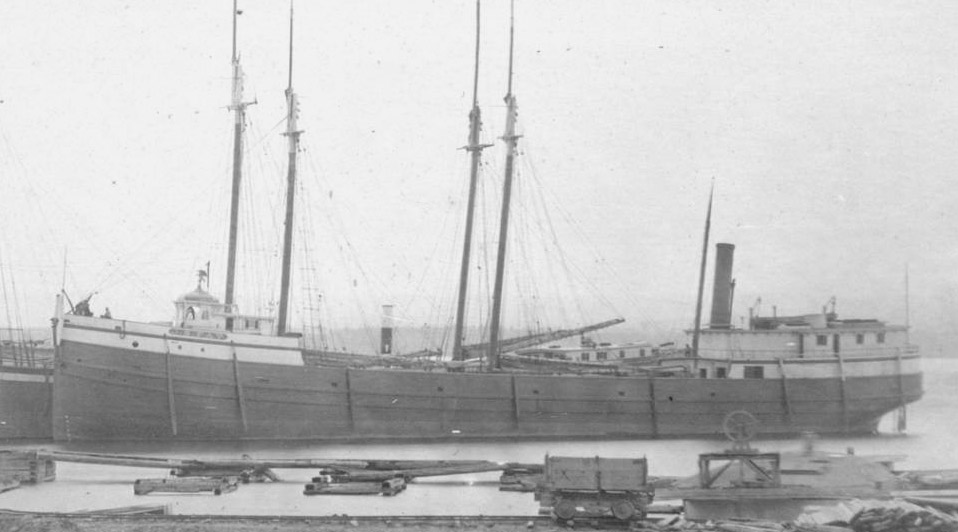
Joseph S Fay, c. 1874

The schooner D. P. Rhodes was built as the Fay's consort, and the pair worked in tandem hauling iron ore. On October 17, 1905, the two ships departed from Escanaba, Michigan en route to Ashtabula, Ohio with a load of iron ore, and the Fay towing the Rhodes. On October 19, 1905, the Fay encountered a strong gale in northern Lake Huron. Hugging the shore in adverse wind conditions, the Fay came too close to the rocks at Forty Mile Point. The captain attempted to recover, pulling out into open water, but the maneuver snapped the towline, sending the Rhodes loose and taking part of the Fay's stern with it.

The loose Rhodes eventually hit rocks at Cheboygan. Aboard the Fay, the captain drove the ship ashore, grounding only 200 yards from the Forty Mile Point Light. At impact, the wheelhouse, deck, mate's and captain's rooms were ripped from the deck and carried it to shore with the captain and 10 crewmen safe inside. The first mate and two other crewmen were left on the ship; the mate eventually tried to swim ashore but drowned. After grounding, the Fay quickly broke apart.

== The wreck today ==
The lower hull of the ship, still containing a load of iron ore, sits in shallow water not far from shore, while a large portion of the starboard side is located on the beach near the lighthouse. In the submerged portion, most of the hull remains intact, as does most of the steam propulsion machinery. The rudder, copper hull sheathing, keelsons, the portside engine mount, the propeller shaft assembly, and iron ore cargo are the most prominent items found on the lake bottom. On the shore, the section of the starboard side is 134 feet long, and features scarfed ceiling planking, paired frame sets, and hundreds of wood and iron fasteners.
