= Amboy =

Amboy may refer to:

== Places ==
=== Argentina ===
- Amboy, Córdoba, commune in Calamuchita Department, Córdoba Province

=== United States ===
- Amboy Crater, feature in Mojave National Preserve, California

==== Settled U.S. places ====
- Amboy, California
- Amboy, Georgia
- Amboy, Illinois
- Amboy, Indiana
- Amboy, Kansas
- Amboy, Minnesota
- Amboy, Nebraska
- New Jersey:
  - Perth Amboy, New Jersey
  - South Amboy, New Jersey
  - The Amboys, area of New Jersey that includes both Perth Amboy and South Amboy
- Amboy, New York
- Amboy, Washington

== Other uses ==
- Amboy (ship)
- Camden and Amboy Railroad and Transportation Company

== See also ==
- Amboy Township (disambiguation)
- The Amboy Dukes (disambiguation)
