= SS William Edenborn =

Great Lakes freighter

Coordinates: 41.542695°N 81.637241°W

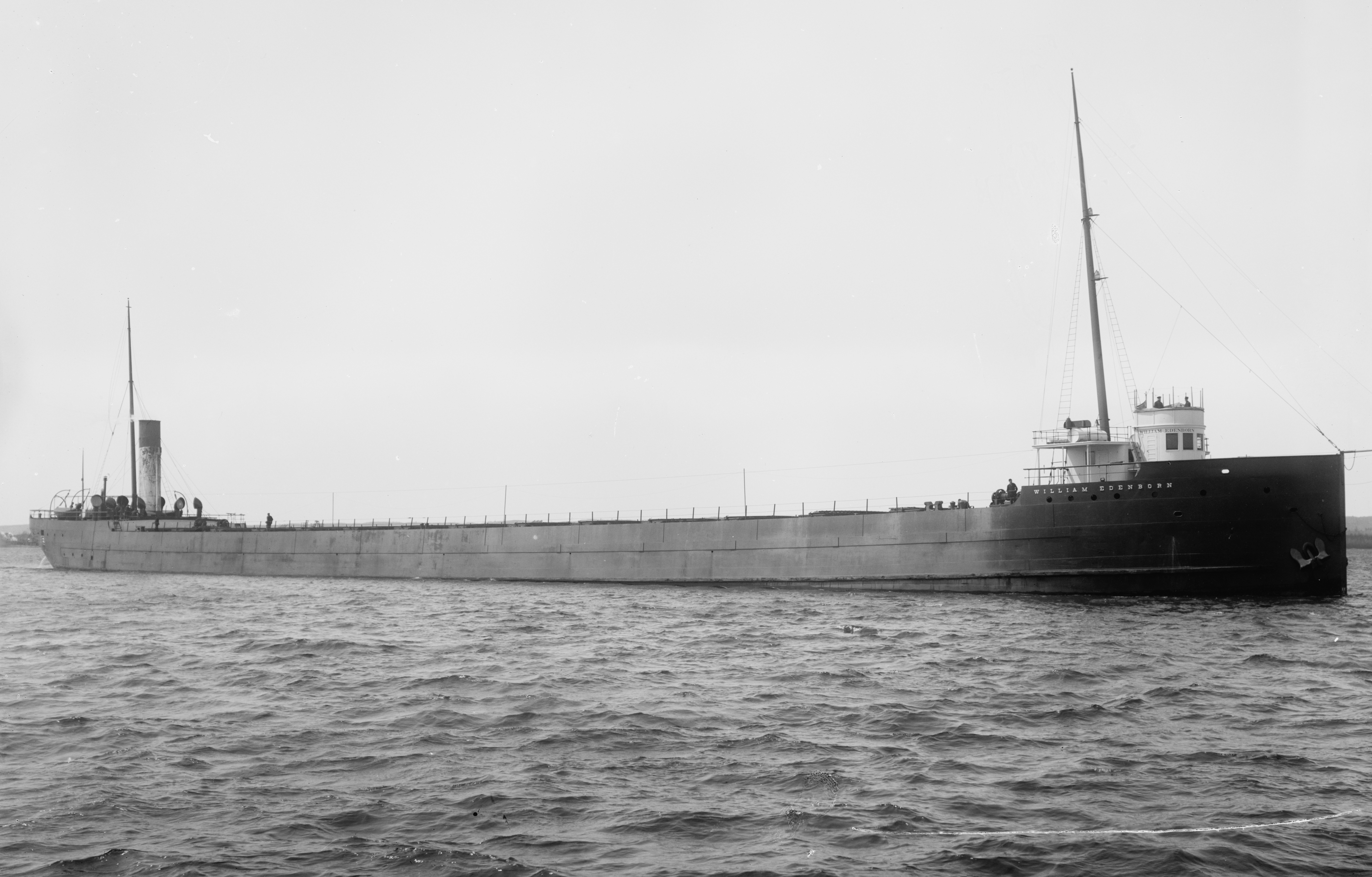
- The steamer William Edenborn underway

History

United States
- Name: William Edenborn
- Namesake: William Edenborn
- Operator: American Steamship Company (1900–1901); Pittsburgh Steamship Company (1901–1952); U.S. Steel (1952–1962)
- Port of registry: United States
- Builder: West Bay City Shipbuilding Company
- Completed: 1900
- In service: 1900
- Out of service: 1962
- Identification: U.S. Registry #81702
- Fate: Sunk as a breakwater at Cleveland, Ohio
- Notes: The William Edenborn is currently buried under 39 ft (12 m) of dredgings from the Cuyahoga River.

General characteristics
- Tonnage: 5,085 GRT, 4,431 NRT
- Length: 497 ft (151 m)
- Beam: 52 ft (16 m)
- Height: 25.16 ft (7.67 m)
- Installed power: 2 x Scotch marine boilers
- Propulsion: Triple expansion steam engine
- Notes: The William Edenborn used to tow the barge Madeira.

SS William Edenborn was a 497-foot (151 m) long Great Lakes freighter that had a 62-year career on the Great Lakes. She was built by the West Bay City Shipbuilding Company of West Bay City, Michigan. She was originally built for the American Steamship Company, in 1900. At the time of her launch she was the largest vessel on the lakes; this is why she was given the title "Queen of the Lakes". In 1901 she was sold to the Pittsburgh Steamship Company.

== Mataafa Storm ==
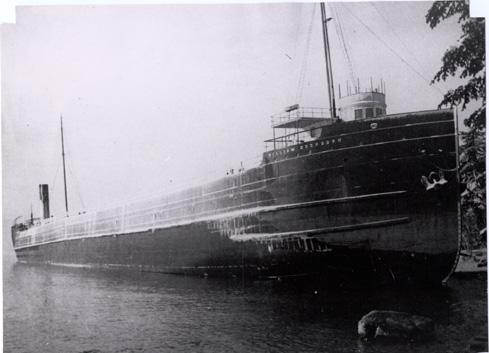
The William Edenborn aground after the Mataafa storm

On 28, November 1905, William Edenborn was towing the barge Madeira, when both vessels were caught in a fierce storm with winds that had a speed of up to 50 miles per hour (80 km/h). The captain of William Edenborn feared the loss of his crew, and his ship and made the decision to cut Madeira loose. Shortly after this Madeira crashed into Split Rock. The first mate of Madeira went down with the ship. Two days later the tug Edna G rescued the stranded crew members of Madeira. On that same day William Edenborn ran aground and broke in two near Split Rock.

== Final years of service ==
In 1952 William Edenborn was transferred to U.S. Steel. She served until 1962 when she was decommissioned, stripped, and sunk as a breakwater at Cleveland, Ohio. She is buried under 39 feet (12 m) of dredgings from the Cuyahoga River.

== See also ==
- SS Mataafa
- SS William E. Corey
- SS Lafayette
- SS Ira H Owen
