= Amboy and George Spencer Shipwreck Sites =

- U.S. National Register of Historic Places
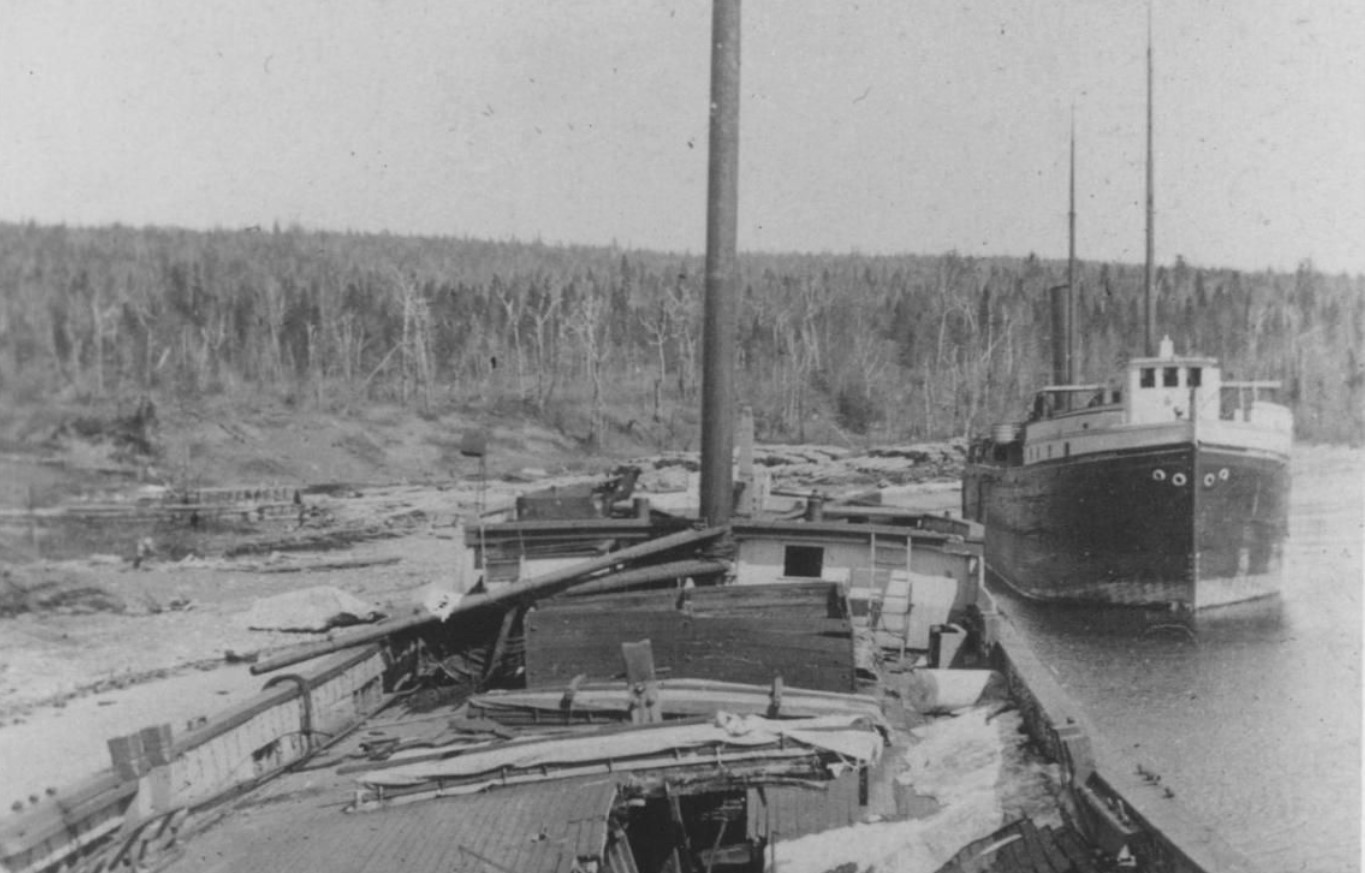

- Location within Minnesota Location within the United States
- Location: Lake Superior shore about a mile southwest of Sugar Loaf Cove
- Nearest city: Schroeder, Minnesota
- Coordinates: 47.478089°N 90.999858°W
- Built: 1884, 1874
- Architect: Thomas Quayle & Sons, Quayle & Murphy
- Architectural style: Freighter, Schooner-barge
- NRHP reference No.: 94000341
- Added to NRHP: April 14, 1994

The Amboy and George Spencer Shipwreck Site is an archeological shipwreck site which consists of the wrecks of the wooden bulk freighter George Spencer and the wooden schooner-barge Amboy. Both vessels were wrecked during the Mataafa Storm of 1905. In 1994 the site was added to the National Register of Historic Places.

== History of the George Spencer ==
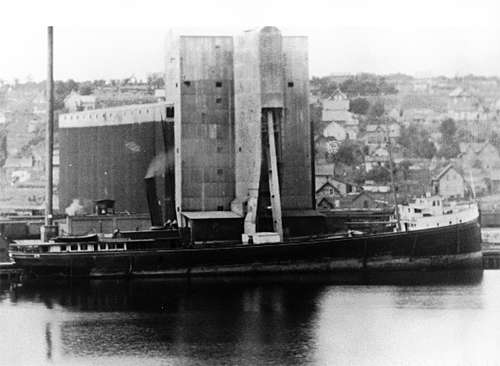
The George Spencer at a dock

The George Spencer (Official number 85849) was built in 1884 by the Thomas Quayle & Sons Shipyard in Cleveland, Ohio. She was built for Thomas Wilson of Cleveland, Ohio. She had an overall length of 242 feet (74 m), she was 230 feet (70 m) long between her perpendiculars, her beam was 37 feet (11 m) wide and her cargo hold was 20 feet (6.1 m) deep. She was powered by a 625-horsepower fore and aft compound engine which was fueled by a coal burning Scotch marine boiler. She had a gross tonnage of 1360.75 tons and a net tonnage of 1082.79 tons. She was used to haul bulk cargoes such as iron ore, coal and grain. She was also one of the first vessels to load iron ore in Two Harbors, Minnesota when the port opened in 1884.

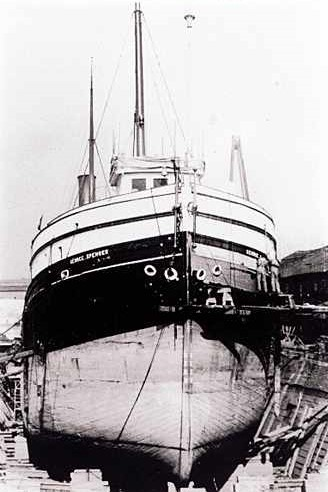
The George Spencer in dry dock

In 1888 the Spencer was sold to B.L. Pennington (Lockwood Taylor & Company). In 1889 the Spencer was transferred Lockwood Taylor Hardware Company (2/3) and B. F. Powers (1/3). In 1895 she was transferred to the Commercial Transit Company. In 1899 the Spencer was sold to the Tonawanda Iron & Steel Company of Tonawanda, New York. On September 9, 1901, the Spencer was sailing down the west channel of the Niagara River when she grounded at the head of Little Island. When she was freed she was towed by the tugs that freed her to a dock. The 1,400 tons of iron ore that was in the Spencer's cargo hold was consigned to the Tonawanda Iron & Steel Plant. The Spencer's grounding was caused by low water levels in the river.

== History of the Amboy ==
The Amboy (Official number 95276) was a wooden schooner barge that was constructed specifically for the Minnesota's iron ore trade. She was built in 1874 by Quayle & Murphy of Cleveland, Ohio. She was 209.3 feet (63.8 m) in length, her beam was 34.2 feet (10.4 m) and her cargo hold was 14.4 feet (4.4 m). She had a gross tonnage of 893 tons, and a net tonnage of 849 tons. She could carry approximately 1,500 tons of cargo. She was originally named Helena. In July 1891 the Helena sank in a collision in the Little Mud Lake, St. Marys River with the loss of one life.

On August 26, 1892, the Amboy arrived in Cleveland, Ohio, full of water. She was traveling from Escanaba, Michigan, when she was caught in a storm. Eventually the amount of water pouring into her hull became too much for the pumps to empty. She was eventually saved by the tugboats Gregory and Blazier; they towed the Amboy to Cleveland.

On October 14, 1893 the Amboy ran aground at the foot of Georgia Street in Buffalo, New York. She was in tow of the steamer Helena but broke away in the strong gale. The Helena left the Amboy to be freed by tugboats. Eventually the tug Cascade came to her assistance and after about half an hours work she was freed.

On September 5, 1898, at around 10:00A.M. the Amboy ran aground in the Niagara River near the Germania Park. She was under tow of the tug James Byers; she was bound from Tonawanda, New York with a cargo of iron ore in her cargo hold. Low water levels caused her keel to hit bottom and run aground. The Byers failed to free her. Eventually the tugs Cascade, Hibbard and Conneaut arrived to try and free her but also failed. A lighter was also sent to try and rescue her by removing part of her cargo.

== Final voyage ==
On the day of November 28, 1905 the Spencer and the Amboy were bound from Buffalo, New York for Duluth, Minnesota with a cargo of coal when they were struck by the full force of the Mataafa Storm. After the storm blew itself out it was discovered that 18 ships had been wrecked or stranded; and one, the steamer Ira H. Owen was lost with all hands. The crew of the Spencer cut the line between her and the Amboy in an attempt to save both of the ships. Both vessels were driven ashore. The crew of the ships escaped the vessels with a breeches buoy which was rigged up by some nearby fishermen.

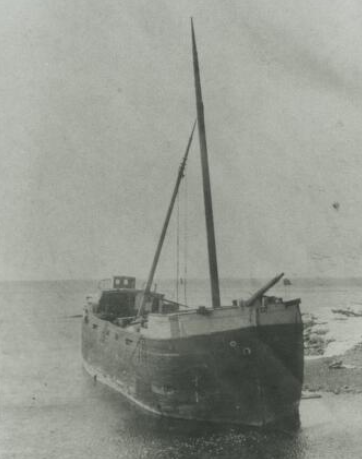
The Amboy aground after the Mataafa Storm

A December 1, 1905 issue of the Duluth Evening Herald described the wreck of the Spencer and the Amboy:

Both boats lost their bearings in the snowstorm and landed on a sandy beach. As soon as they struck, buoys with lines were thrown over the side. When they floated ashore they were caught by fishermen and made fast. With an improvised life buoy rigged in the hawsers the entire crew were taken safely to shore preceded by Mrs. Harry Lawe, wife of the mate, who was acting as steward. The vessels ran on the rocks Tuesday morning, and for thirteen hours the situation of the crew on the battered hulks was desperate. Fishermen rushed into the surf almost to their necks and aided the sailors to escape. The Spencer's cargo can be lightered but there is little hope for saving the boat. The vessels were coming up without cargo to load ore. Capt. Frank Conland sailed the Spencer and Fred Watson was master of the Amboy. The Spencer was valued at $35,000 and the Amboy at $10,000.

A December 6, 1905 issue of the Duluth News Tribune wrote about the assessment of the wrecks:

Captain C.O. Flynn returned last evening from an inspection of the stranded steamer George Spencer and schooner Amboy. He said "the schooner Amboy is a total wreck...the steamer Spencer is still in good shape. Her hatches are intact, and she does not appear to be seriously damaged. As to the condition of her bottom that cannot be told at present.

== The George Spencer today ==
The remains of the George Spencer lies off the beach and about one mile south of Sugar Loaf Cove, the quarter mile long stretch of beach is crescent shaped and blends from the large cobbles on the north to the sand on the south section of the beach. Even though much of her hull was removed there are still large bits of her hull on the site. Her wreck is a lot more intact than that of the Amboy. The wreckage of the Spencer consists of a 141-foot (43 m) long section of the base of her wooden hull from the turn of the bilge down. Her hull lies perpendicular to the beach. A piece of her hull, possibly the bow lies in 3 feet (0.91 m) of water and about 40 feet (12 m) from the beach. Her stern lies in 20 feet (6.1 m).

== The Amboy today ==
The remains of the Amboy lies not too far from the wreck of the Spencer. The remains of the Amboy's 74-foot (23 m) keelson is encased in sand and cobbles. The section of her keelson which is parallel to the beach has been eroded by the waves, it consists of side-by-side white oak timbers. It is two timbers high and secured with hundreds of iron bolts that are .875 inches in diameter. Near the southern end of the timbers there is an upright timber which is believed to be part of her centreboard.
