= William C. Edenborn =

American industrialist and inventor

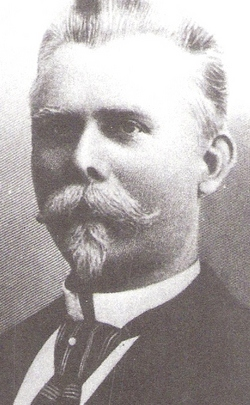
- Born: March 20, 1848; Plettenberg, Westphalia, Prussia
- Died: May 13, 1926 (aged 78); Shreveport, Louisiana, U.S.
- Occupations: Inventor; Entrepreneur; Businessperson
- Known for: Invention of barbed wire manufacturing process Founding of Louisiana Railway and Navigation Company
- Spouse: Sarah Edenborn (née Drain)

William C. Edenborn (1848–1926) was an inventor, steel industrialist, and railroad magnate. He patented the design for a machine for inexpensive manufacture of barbed wire. Edenborn founded the Louisiana Railway and Navigation Company, which operated between Shreveport, Louisiana, and New Orleans, Louisiana. Through a series of mergers and acquisitions, this railroad formed the Louisiana and Arkansas Railroad and eventually part of the Kansas City Southern Railroad.

By the time of his death in 1926, Edenborn was reputed to be the wealthiest resident of Louisiana. The New Orleans Times-Picayune stated that Edenborn was "one of the most colorful and picturesque, and at the same time one of the least known, of the Louisiana captains of industry."

== Personal life ==
Edenborn was born to parents Jacob Edenborn and Antoinette Edenborn (née Hessmer) on March 20, 1848, in Plettenberg, Westphalia, Prussia. As a child, he attended private schools. However, his parents both died when Edenborn was twelve years old. After his parents' death, his sister Lena and he were without financial resources and so they lived with the Keyser family who were relatives of the Edenborns.

Because of his limited finances, Edenborn obtained an apprenticeship at a steel-wire manufacturing plant in Plettenberg, Germany. Here Edenborn learned about metal work and the wire production business.

In 1867, Edenborn emigrated to the United States with his cousin Herman Keyser, whom he had befriended, initially living in Pittsburgh, Pennsylvania. In the United States, Edenborn continued in the wire production business, obtaining work as a mechanic at a wire mill in Frankstown, Pennsylvania.

During this Post-Civil War Expansion of the United States, there was much demand for steel-wire and various other wire products. In 1869, Edenborn moved to St. Louis, Missouri, at which time he worked with local businessman F.M. Ludlow in the design and construction of a wire mill. Edenborn carried out this work partly on a futures basis, a start in his ownership of wire production enterprises. He continued to work with Ludlow, as manufacturing manager until 1874. At that time, Edenborn took on sales responsibilities at another of Ludlow's enterprises, the Ludlow-Saylor Wire Company.

Edenborn supplemented his on-the-job training with a business course at Jones's Commercial College in St. Louis. In 1875, he took leave from Ludlow's enterprises for a leave-of-absence in Europe to refresh his knowledge of state-of-the-art wire technology.

=== Marriage and later years ===
In 1876, Edenborn married Sarah Drain of St. Louis, Missouri. They had two children, one of whom they adopted. Both children died at young ages, one of a horseback riding accident and the other of diphtheria. His wife Sarah also served as a business confidant for the rest of Edenborn's life. She often accompanied him on his frequent business trips.

Following their relocation to Louisiana, at a time when Edenborn had already acquired considerable wealth, he and his wife maintained two homes. One was in New Orleans, and the other was a plantation home near Atlanta, Louisiana, which he named Emden after the Ems River in Europe.

During his time in New Orleans, Edenborn and his wife lived modestly despite their wealth. His business enterprises paid him a salary of $200 per year. The couple's New Orleans home was a modest house at 8018 Hampson Street in the Carrollton neighborhood of New Orleans.

Edenborn developed an extensive network of friends and acquaintances during his life and career. He befriended others, such as singer Leadbelley Ledbetter, whom Edenborn frequently visited while Ledbetter was incarcerated at Angola State Penitentiary. He was reputed to be a generous philanthropist, although the extent of his philanthropy is unknown since his gifts were generally done anonymously. He was a member of the Democratic Party throughout his business career.

In 1918, during United States involvement in World War I, Edenborn was accused by federal authorities of being in violation of the Sedition Act of 1918, because of a public statement Edenborn made that Germany was not a threat to US soil. He was arrested and briefly detained, with no charges being pressed.

Edenborn spent most of the latter years of his life at the Emden Plantation home. He died in 1926 of vascular diseases and was buried at Forest Park Cemetery in Shreveport. His estate was contested for many years. As of 2017, Emden Plantation is no longer extant.

=== Estate disposition ===
Edenborn died without a will in 1926 and left no surviving children or forced heirs. Consequently, his widow, Sarah, succeeded to his entire estate, then valued at more than $12 million. Earlier, in 1908, Edenborn had executed a will, under which Paul Hessmer and others were named as legatees; but in 1919 Edenborn signed another document revoking the 1908 will. Years after Sarah had been placed in possession of the entire estate, Hessmer and the other legatees under the 1908 will initiated litigation arguing that the 1919 revocation was invalid, and sought to have the 1908 will admitted to probate. In a 1941 decision, the Louisiana Supreme Court held that the 1919 revocation was valid, thus confirming Sarah Edenborn's succession to the entire estate.

== Career ==
=== Wire and cable industry ===
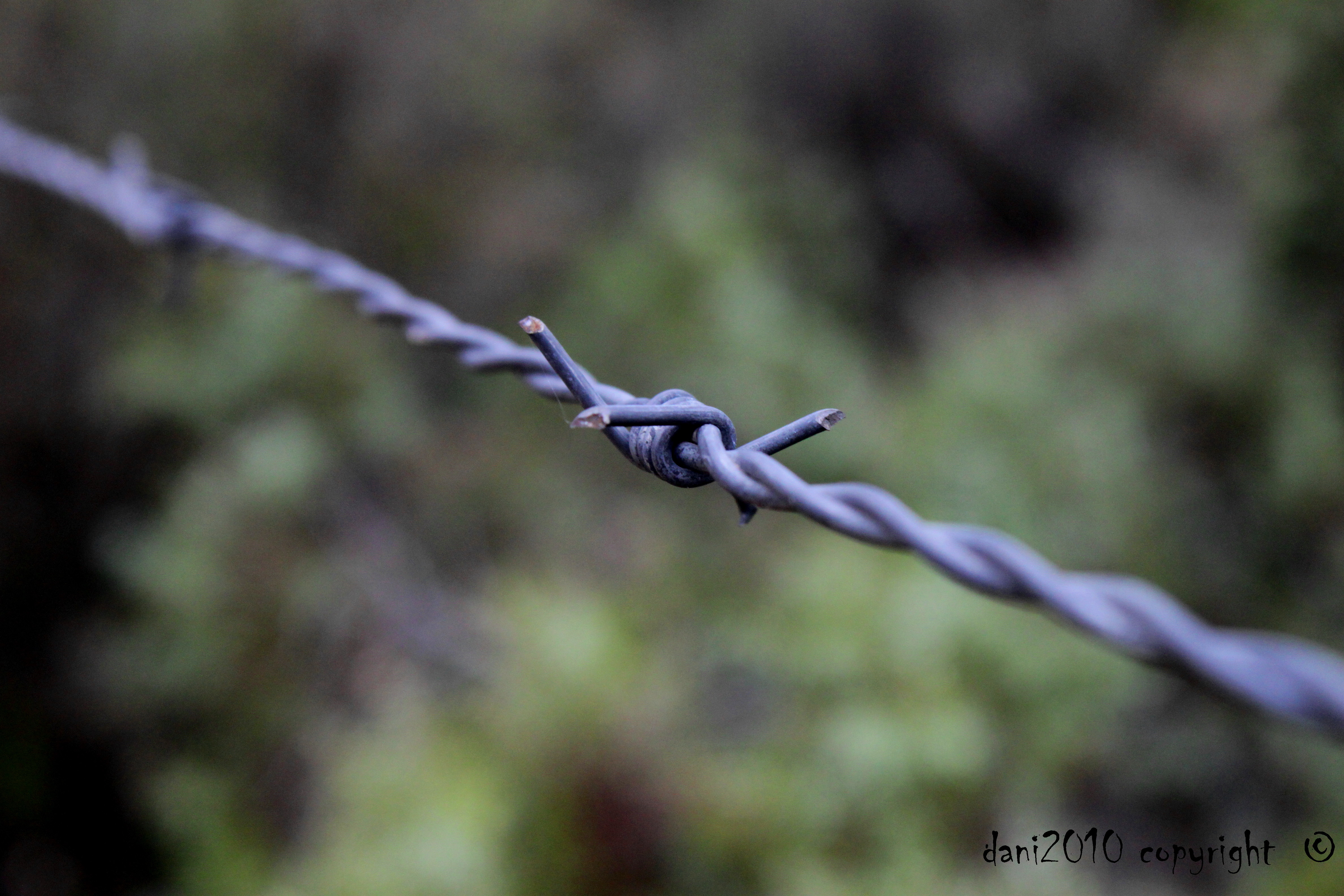
Example of barb wire

In 1877, on his return from his leave-of absence in Europe, Edenborn founded the St. Louis Wire Mill Company with business associate O.P. Saylor by leasing the manufacturing facility first built by F.M. Ludlow. Edenborn then had a succession of business interests and technical inventions related to wire manufacture and expanding its markets. These included acquisition of smaller barb wire producers, enabling him to consolidate the industry. He conducted his wire business with various business partners. Most notably, with John Warne Gates, Edenborn formed the Consolidated Steel and Wire Company.

Edenborn's inventions significantly reduced the cost of production of barb-wire, enabling Edenborn's wire company to control approximately 75% of the market. Besides the lower cost, Edenborn's barb wired production process resulted in a more humane form, one that was less injurious to farm animals.

In standard practice, Edenborn's patented inventions were all in his own name without direct assignment to his corporate holdings. He granted royalty-free licenses to the companies that he owned and licensed his inventions elsewhere in the world for a significant royalty.

==== New markets and opportunities ====
By the latter part of the 19th century, the market for telegraph and telephone wire expanded significantly, and Edenborn's companies capitalized on this opportunity. He established a series of new wire companies to take advantage of the growth opportunities and to capitalize on his inventions. Some of Edenborn's new companies included the Harrison Wire Company, Missouri Barbed Fence Company, Western Union Barbed Wire Fence Company. He also acquired the Harrison Wire Company of St. Louis, Missouri.

Subsequently, under Edenborn's direction, Consolidated Steel and Wire Company merged with six other companies in the wire industry to form the American Steel and Wire Company. This firm was incorporated under Illinois state law in 1898 and became known colloquially as the "wire trust". Edenborn and Gates remained principle stockholders in the new firm. The firm was the world's largest producer of barb wire and steel wire products at the time.

As the owner and manager of the American Steel and Wire Co., Edenborn took action to mutually beneficial relations between labor and management. This included establishing the Employees' Benefit and Insurance Association, providing insurance and a pension at the company's expense, to benefit his employees.

In 1901, Edenborn sold his ownership of the wire companies to J.P. Morgan for $100 million, putting him among the wealthiest people in the United States at the time. These companies then became part of the US Steel Corporation. As a result of the acquisition of his companies, Edenborn served on the board of directors and on the executive committee of US Steel Corporation until his resignation in 1909.

During his time with the American Steel and Wire Company, Edenborn is reputed to have said:

After I got a start, I just went ahead in leaps and bounds. Everything I touched made money for me.

=== Railroads and land ===
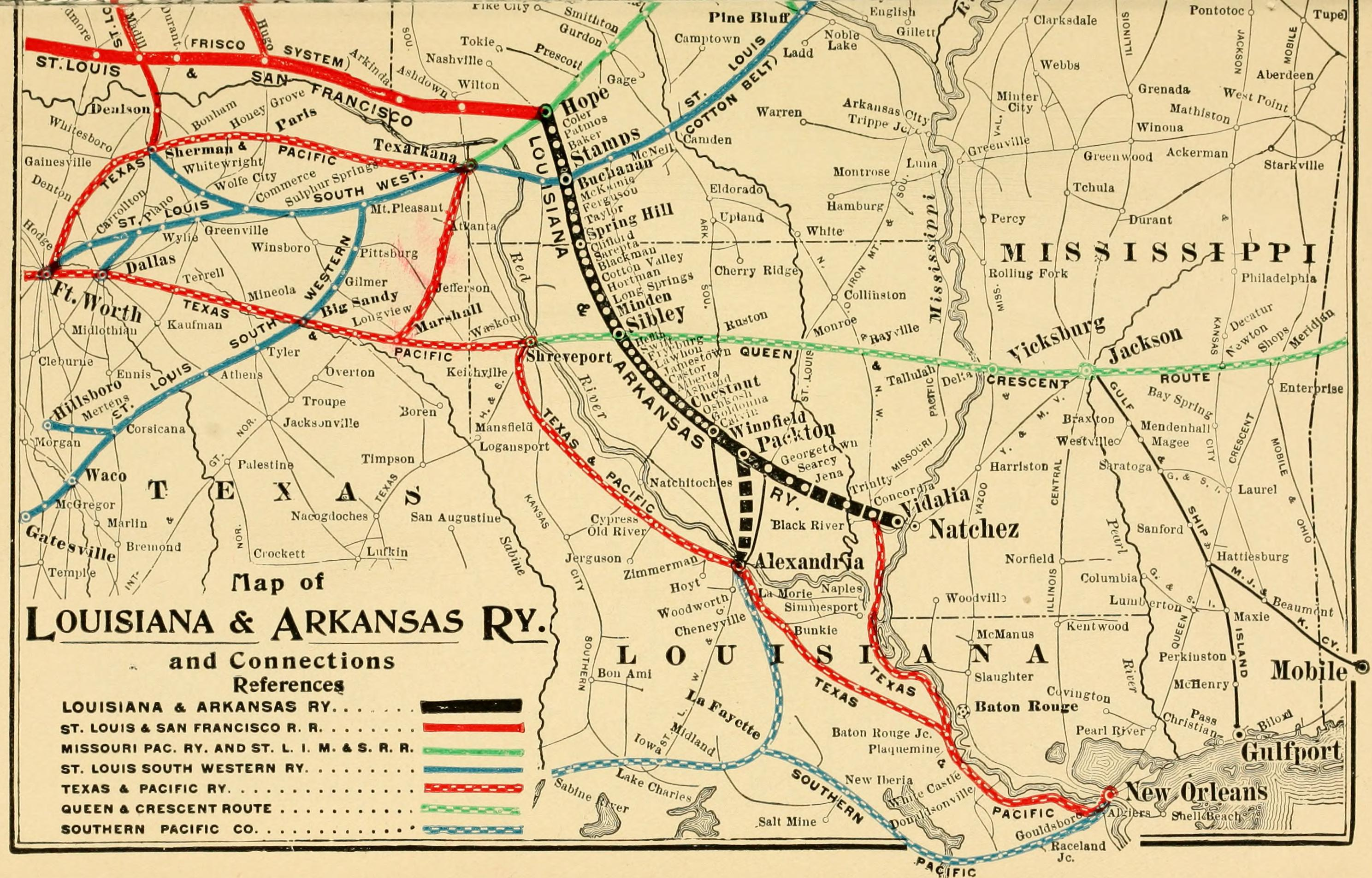
1904 routes of the Louisiana and Arkansas Railway

Toward the end of the 19th century, as his business interests in wire and cable diminished, Edenborn pursued diverse business interests including cotton, forestry products, and railroads. He and his wife visited Shreveport, Louisiana, for which Edenborn perceived that the town's cotton and forestry products businesses were under-served by railroads. For this reason, Edenborn began investing in land and railroads in Louisiana. Within a short period of time, he acquired more than a million acres of land in Louisiana. He established the Shreveport and Red River Valley Navigation Railroad Company.

In 1898 Edenborn created the Louisiana Central Construction Company for construction of his railroads, with a mix of freight and passenger service beginning in that year. One of his construction practices was to choose very low grades for the routes of the railroad so as to hold construction costs to a minimum. At times, Edenborn purchased used rolling stock and railroad locomotives to minimize costs. He also built branches of the railroad, such as the Colfax and Northern Railway in order to better serve the local timber industry.

Initially Edenborn's railroad had no competition, although the Louisiana and North West Railroad, the Arkansas Southern Railroad, and the Louisiana and Arkansas Railroad soon appeared. The competition caused Edenborn to extend his service ultimately to New Orleans. Early on, Edenborn used a mix of rail and steamboat service for the extension to New Orleans, and, in this way, his railroad could serve the lucrative cotton trade of the region.

Around the same time, Edenborn and John Warne Gates invested in another regional railroad, the Kansas City, Pittsburgh and Gulf Railroad, which served a corridor near Shreveport. Edenborn and Gates reorganized the railroad at which time it became known as the Kansas City Southern Railway Company. Edenborn served on the railroad's board of directors from 1900 to 1902. He eventually became chairman of the board of the Kansas City Southern Railroad.

In 1903, Edenborn created the Louisiana Railway and Navigation Company. This new company pursued service of Edenborn's network of Louisiana railways all the way into New Orleans. The service into New Orleans commenced in 1906. His railroads started passenger service into New Orleans the following year.

==== Public funding and politics ====
As Edenborn sought to expand his railroad, he often pursued public funding to offset construction costs. Huey Long was a rising local politician at the time, from an influential political family. Long and his political family opposed Edenborn's pursuit of public funding, which set the stage for a political feud between Edenborn and Huey Long. This feud persisted for the rest of Edenborn's career.

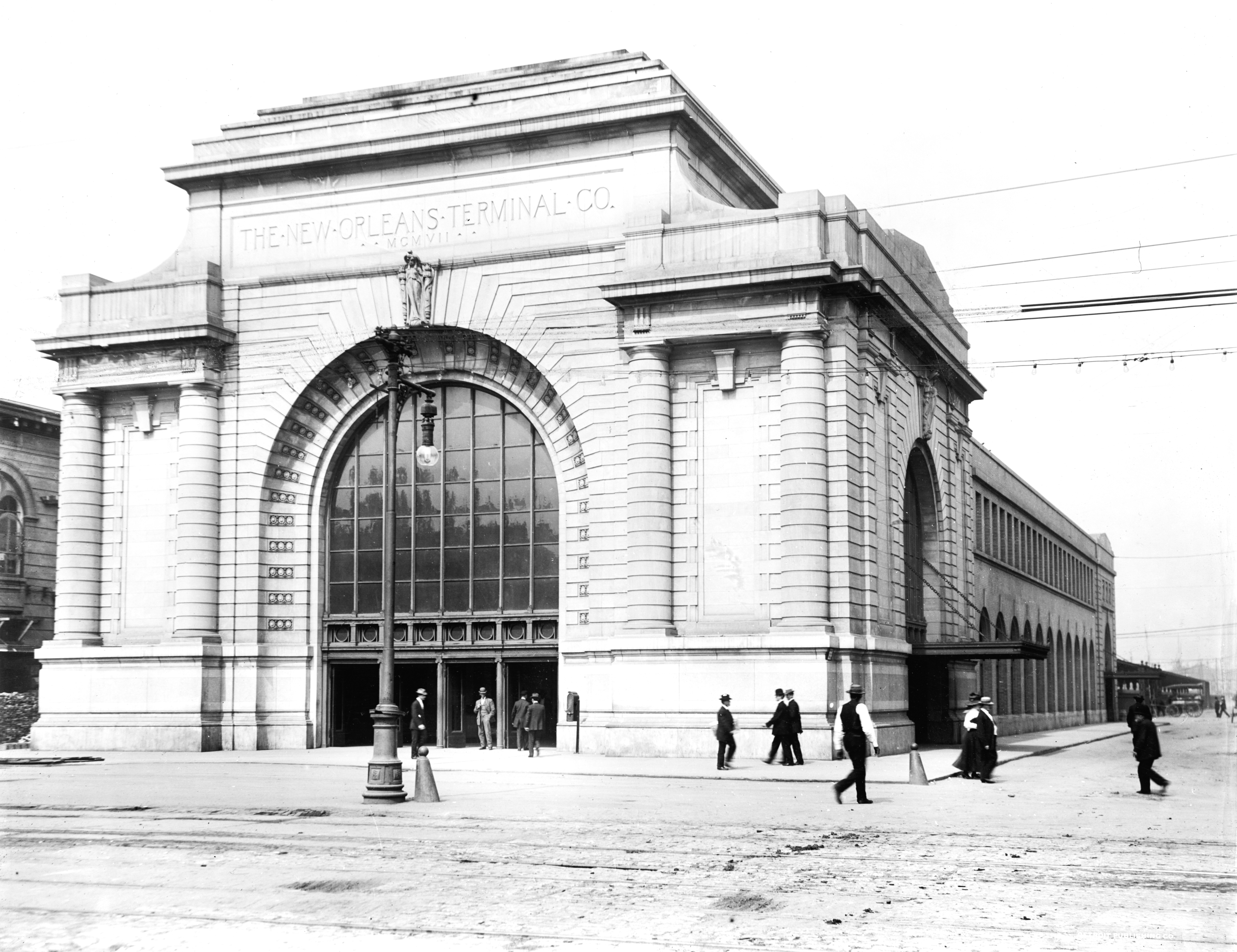
Terminal Station on Canal Street in New Orleans, used by the Louisiana Railway and Navigation Co.

Edenborn had been managing his Louisiana railroads from his home in New York City. He relocated to New Orleans, coincident with the start of his railroad service into the city. By that time, his railroad was approximately 306 miles long, with ferry service to cross the Mississippi River in order to enter the city of New Orleans. The railroad carried various types of freight, especially timber, cotton, sugar, and oil. Edenborn at times leased trackage rights to other railroads. The railroad billed itself as the "Short Line Through Louisiana".

While Edenborn continued to spend money expanding the railroad and purchasing rolling stock and suitable ferry service, he compromised on track maintenance. In 1918, Huey Long became a member of the Louisiana Railroad Commission. In that position, Long pressured Edenborn to provide suitable upkeep on the railroad. Financial records indicate that the railroad was earning a low return-on-investment, even though it appeared to meet Edenborn's cash flow needs. Long's pressure on Edenborn subsided when Long became governor of Louisiana.

Edenborn continued to expand the railroad. In 1923, Edenborn's Louisiana Railway & Navigation Co. purchased a route to Dallas, Texas, in a $700,000 cash transaction. Subsequently, the railroad went through a succession of name changes, from the Louisiana Arkansas & Texas Railroad to the Louisiana & Arkansas Railroad.

After his death, his wife Sarah Edenborn became chief executive of their railroad. She was the first woman to hold such a position at a railroad in the United States. Sarah Edenborn sold the railroad to railroad executive Harvey Couch in a transaction that was completed just before the 1929 stock market crash.

=== Experimental farming ===
Edenborn used his Emden Plantation and its surrounding land as an agricultural experiment station. Among his agricultural endeavors, he experimented with improved peanut production using advice he received from George Washington Carver. At Emden Plantation, Edenborn invented an apparatus for improved distillation of pine oil for turpentine manufacture, for which he received a United States patent. He worked on means of farming silkworms, improved cotton harvest, and pest protection of cotton plants. Edenborn was also involved in a reforestation effort in the nearby community of Winnfield, Louisiana.

== Recognition ==
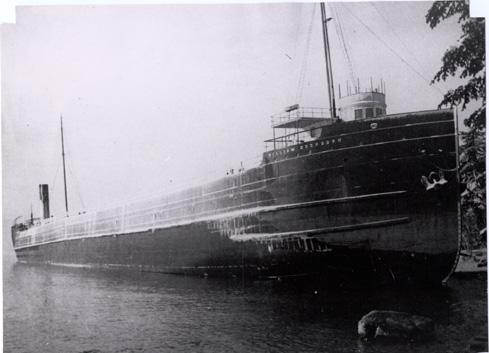
SS William Edenborn aground after the Mataafa Storm

A Great Lakes freighter ship, the SS William Edenborn, was named after Edenborn. The ship ran aground in 1905 in a storm, five years after its launching. The ship was severely damaged, although it was restored to service, operating until its decommissioning in 1962. Another Great Lakes freighter ship was named after his wife, the SS Sarah Edenborn.

Edenborn Avenue in Metairie, Louisiana, is named after him, as was the Edenborn Post Office in Gonzales, Louisiana.

Edenborn named a railroad depot in Avoyelles Parish, Louisiana, "Hessmer" after his mother's surname at birth. A village eventually was built around this depot, and it became known as Hessmer, Louisiana.

== United States patents ==
- Edenborn, William C.; Griesche, Gustav. Barb-wire Machine. US 270,646, United States Patent and Trademark Office, January 16, 1863.
- Edenborn, William. Machine for Coiling Wire. US 480,565A, United States Patent and Trademark Office, August 9, 1892.
- Edenborn, William. Wire-Fencing Machine. US 653,889, United States Patent and Trademark Office, July 10, 1900.
- Edenborn, William. Apparatus for Extracting Resin and Allied Products. US 1,351,629, United States Patent and Trademark Office, August 31, 1920.
