= SS George Spencer =

Wooden steamship wrecked in the Mataafa Storm of 1905

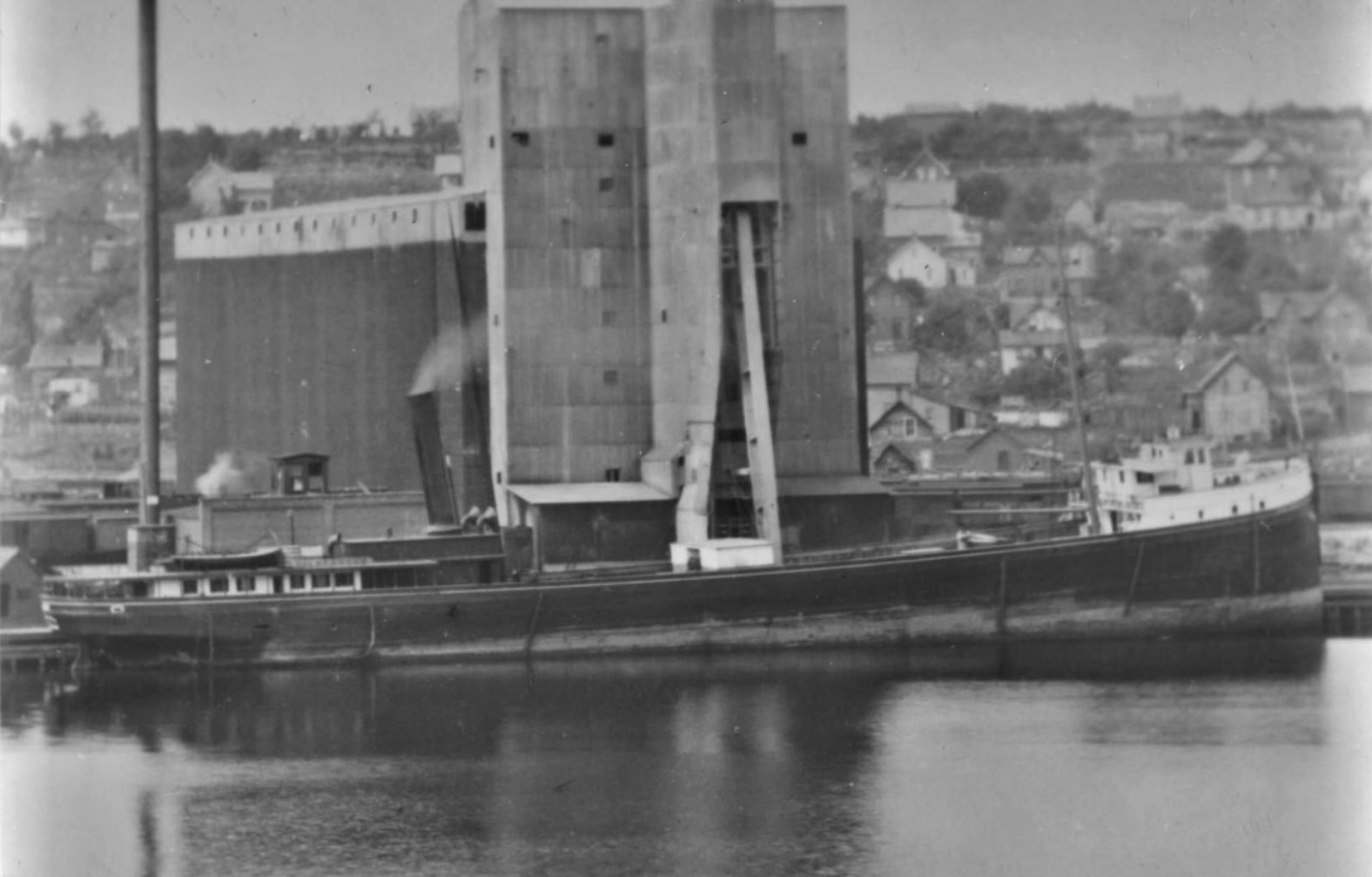
- George Spencer in Midland, Ontario

History

United States
- Name: George Spencer
- Operator: Tonawanda Iron & Steel Company
- Port of registry: United States
- Builder: Thomas Quayle & Sons
- Completed: 1884
- In service: July 21, 1884
- Out of service: November 28, 1905
- Identification: U.S. Registry #85849
- Fate: Ran aground on Lake Superior in the Mataafa Storm of 1905

General characteristics
- Class & type: Bulk Freighter
- Tonnage: 1,360.75 GRT; 1082.79 NRT
- Length: 242 feet (74 m) LOA; 230 feet (70 m) LBP
- Beam: 37 feet (11 m)
- Height: 20 feet (6.1 m)
- Installed power: 1 × Scotch marine boiler
- Propulsion: 625 horsepower fore and aft compound engine

National Register of Historic Places data
George Spencer Shipwreck Site
U.S. National Register of Historic Places
Location within Minnesota Location within the United States
Location	Cook County, Minnesota
Nearest city	Schroeder, Minnesota
Coordinates	47.4779°N 90.9983°W
Built	1884
Architect	Thomas Quayle & Sons
Architectural style	Freighter
MPS	Minnesota's Lake Superior Shipwrecks MPS
NRHP reference No.	94000341
Added to NRHP	April 14, 1994

The George Spencer was a wooden lake freighter that sank on along with her schooner barge Amboy on Lake Superior, near Thomasville, Cook County, Minnesota in the Mataafa Storm of 1905. On April 14, 1994, the wrecks of the Spencer and the Amboy were listed on the National Register of Historic Places.

== History ==
The George Spencer (Official number 85849) was built in 1884 by the Thomas Quayle & Sons Shipyard in Cleveland, Ohio. She was built for Thomas Wilson of Cleveland, Ohio. She had an overall length of 242 feet (74 m), she was 230 feet (70 m) long between her perpendiculars, her beam was 37 feet (11 m) wide and her cargo hold was 20 feet (6.1 m) deep. She was powered by a 625-horsepower fore and aft compound engine which was fueled by a coal burning Scotch marine boiler. She had a gross register tonnage of 1360.75 and a net register tonnage of 1082.79. She was used to haul bulk cargoes such as iron ore, coal and grain. She was also one of the first vessels to load iron ore in Two Harbors, Minnesota when the port opened in 1884.

In 1888 the Spencer was sold to B.L. Pennington (Lockwood Taylor & Company). In 1889 the Spencer was transferred Lockwood Taylor Hardware Company (2/3) and B. F. Powers (1/3). On 8 August 1894 she rescued the crew of the steamer Roanoke from lifeboats after their ship burned in Lake Superior the night before. In 1895 she was transferred to the Commercial Transit Company. In 1899 the Spencer was sold to the Tonawanda Iron & Steel Company of Tonawanda, New York. On September 9, 1901, the Spencer was sailing down the west channel of the Niagara River when she grounded at the head of Little Island. When she was freed she was towed by the tugs that freed her to a dock. The cargo of 1,400 tons of iron ore in the Spencer's cargo hold was consigned to the Tonawanda Iron & Steel Plant. Spencer's grounding was caused by low water levels in the river.

== Final voyage ==
On the day of November 28, 1905 the Spencer and the Amboy were bound from Buffalo, New York for Duluth, Minnesota with a cargo of coal when they were struck by the full force of the Mataafa Storm. After the storm blew itself out it was discovered that 18 ships were wrecked or stranded; and one, the steamer Ira H. Owen was lost with all hands. The crew of the Spencer cut the line between her and the Amboy in an attempt to save both of the ships. Both vessels were driven ashore. The crew of the ships escaped the vessels with a breeches' buoy which was rigged up by some nearby fishermen. A December 1, 1905 issue of the Duluth Evening Herald described the wreck of the Spencer and the Amboy:

Both boats lost their bearings in the snowstorm and landed on a sandy beach. As soon as they struck, buoys with lines were thrown over the side. When they floated ashore they were caught by fishermen and made fast. With an improvised life buoy rigged in the hawsers the entire crew were taken safely to shore preceded by Mrs. Harry Lawe, wife of the mate, who was acting as steward. The vessels ran on the rocks Tuesday morning, and for thirteen hours the situation of the crew on the battered hulks was desperate. Fishermen rushed into the surf almost to their necks and aided the sailors to escape. The Spencer's cargo can be lightered but there is little hope for saving the boat. The vessels were coming up without cargo to load ore. Capt. Frank Conland sailed the Spencer and Fred Watson was master of the Amboy. The Spencer was valued at $35,000 and the Amboy at $10,000.

A December 6, 1905 issue of the Duluth News Tribune wrote about the assessment of the wrecks:

Captain C.O. Flynn returned last evening from an inspection of the stranded steamer George Spencer and schooner Amboy. He said "the schooner Amboy is a total wreck ... the steamer Spencer is still in good shape. Her hatches are intact, and she does not appear to be seriously damaged. As to the condition of her bottom that cannot be told at present.

== The George Spencer today ==
The remains of the George Spencer lies off the beach and about one mile south of Sugar Loaf Cove, the quarter mile long stretch of beach is crescent shaped and blends from the large cobbles on the north to the sand on the south section of the beach. Even though much of her hull was removed there are still large bits of her hull on the site. Her wreck is a lot more intact than that of the Amboy. The wreckage of the Spencer consists of a 141-foot (43 m) long section of the base of her wooden hull from the turn of the bilge down. Her hull lies perpendicular to the beach. A piece of her hull, possibly the bow lies in 3 feet (0.91 m) of water and about 40 feet (12 m) from the beach. Her stern lies in 20 feet (6.1 m).
