= Amboy (schooner-barge) =

Wooden schooner-barge wrecked in the Mataafa Storm of 1905

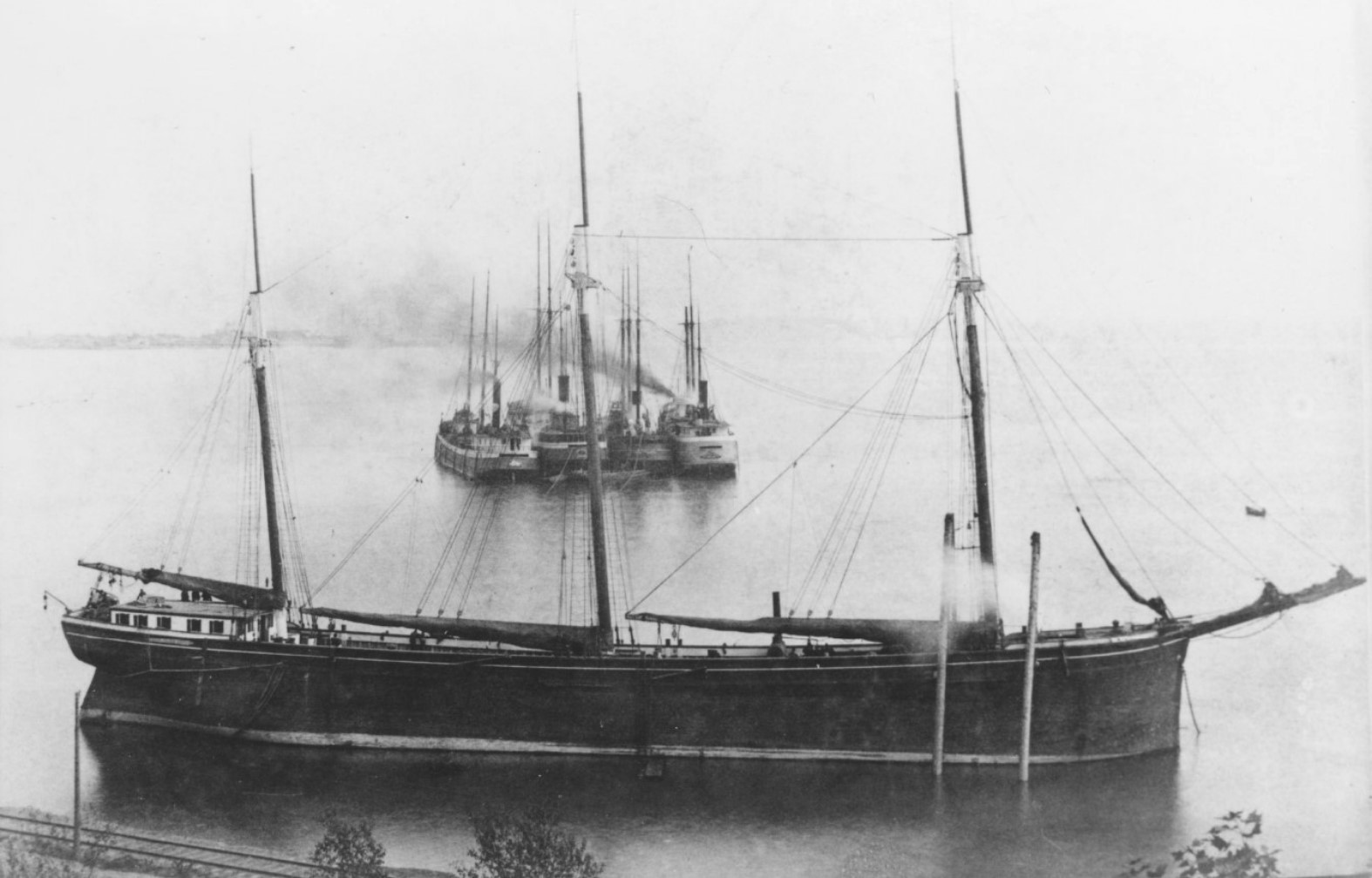
- Amboy's identical sister ship, Sumatra

History

United States
- Name: Amboy
- Operator: Tonawanda Iron & Steel Company
- Port of registry: United States
- Builder: Quayle & Murphy
- Completed: 1874
- Out of service: November 28, 1905
- Identification: U.S. Registry #95276
- Fate: Ran aground on Lake Superior in the Mataafa Storm of 1905

General characteristics
- Tonnage: 893 GRT; 849 NRT
- Length: 209.3 feet (63.8 m)
- Beam: 34.2 feet (10.4 m)
- Height: 14.4 feet (4.4 m)

National Register of Historic Places data
Amboy Shipwreck Site
U.S. National Register of Historic Places
Location within Minnesota Location within the United States
Location	Lake Superior, about a mile southwest of Sugar Loaf Cove
Coordinates	47.478089°N 90.999858°W
Built	1874
Architect	Quayle & Murphy
NRHP reference No.	94000341
Added to NRHP	April 14, 1994

The Amboy was a wooden schooner barge that sank along with her towing steamer, the George Spencer on Lake Superior off the coast of Schroeder, Cook County, Minnesota in the United States. In 1994 the remains of the Amboy were added to the National Register of Historic Places.

== History ==
The Amboy (Official number 95276) was a wooden schooner barge that was constructed specifically for the Minnesota's iron ore trade. She was built in 1874 by Quayle & Murphy of Cleveland, Ohio. She was 209.3 feet (63.8 m) in length, her beam was 34.2 feet (10.4 m) and her cargo hold was 14.4 feet (4.4 m). She had a gross tonnage of 893 tons, and a net tonnage of 849 tons. She could carry approximately 1,500 tons of cargo. She was originally named Helena. In July 1891 the Helena sank in a collision in the Little Mud Lake, St. Marys River with the loss of one life.

On August 26, 1892, the Amboy arrived in Cleveland, Ohio, full of water. She was traveling from Escanaba, Michigan, when she was caught in a storm. Eventually the amount of water pouring into her hull became too much for the pumps to empty. She was eventually saved by the tugboats Gregory and Blazier; they towed the Amboy to Cleveland.

On October 14, 1893, the Amboy ran aground at the foot of Georgia Street in Buffalo, New York. She was in tow of the steamer Helena but broke away in the strong gale. The Helena left the Amboy to be freed by tugboats. Eventually the tug Cascade came to her assistance and after about half an hours work she was freed.

On September 5, 1898, at around 10:00A.M. the Amboy ran aground in the Niagara River near the Germania Park. She was under tow of the tug James Byers; she was bound from Tonawanda, New York with a cargo of iron ore in her cargo hold. Low water levels caused her keel to hit bottom and run aground. The Byers failed to free her. Eventually the tugs Cascade, Hibbard and Conneaut arrived to try to free her but also failed. A lighter was also sent to try to rescue her by removing part of her cargo.

== Final voyage ==
On the day of November 28, 1905 the Amboy and the wooden bulk freighter George Spencer were bound from Buffalo, New York for Duluth, Minnesota with a cargo of coal when they were struck by the full force of the Mataafa Storm. After the storm blew itself out it was discovered that 18 ships were wrecked or stranded; and one, the steamer Ira H. Owen was lost with all hands. The crew of the Spencer cut the line between her and the Amboy in an attempt to save both of the ships. Both vessels were driven ashore. The crew of the ships escaped the vessels with a breeches' buoy which was rigged up by some nearby fishermen. A December 1, 1905 issue of the Duluth Evening Herald described the wreck of the Spencer and the Amboy:

Both boats lost their bearings in the snowstorm and landed on a sandy beach. As soon as they struck, buoys with lines were thrown over the side. When they floated ashore they were caught by fishermen and made fast. With an improvised life buoy rigged in the hawsers the entire crew were taken safely to shore preceded by Mrs. Harry Lawe, wife of the mate, who was acting as steward. The vessels ran on the rocks Tuesday morning, and for thirteen hours the situation of the crew on the battered hulks was desperate. Fishermen rushed into the surf almost to their necks and aided the sailors to escape. The Spencer's cargo can be lightered but there is little hope for saving the boat. The vessels were coming up without cargo to load ore. Capt. Frank Conland sailed the Spencer and Fred Watson was master of the Amboy. The Spencer was valued at $35,000 and the Amboy at $10,000.

A December 6, 1905 issue of the Duluth News Tribune wrote about the assessment of the wrecks:

Captain C.O. Flynn returned last evening from an inspection of the stranded steamer George Spencer and schooner Amboy. He said "the schooner Amboy is a total wreck ... the steamer Spencer is still in good shape. Her hatches are intact, and she does not appear to be seriously damaged. As to the condition of her bottom that cannot be told at present.

== The Amboy today ==
The remains of the Amboy lie not too far from the wreck of the Spencer. The remains of the Amboy's 74-foot (23 m) keelson is encased in sand and cobbles. The section of her keelson which is parallel to the beach has been eroded by the waves, it consists of side-by-side white oak timbers. It is two timbers high and secured with hundreds of iron bolts that are 1.25 and .875 inches in diameter. Near the southern end of the timbers there is an upright timber which is believed to be part of her centreboard. These remains can easily be viewed with satellite imagery, such as Google Earth.
