= Cowles, Nebraska =

Village in Webster County, Nebraska, United States

- Village
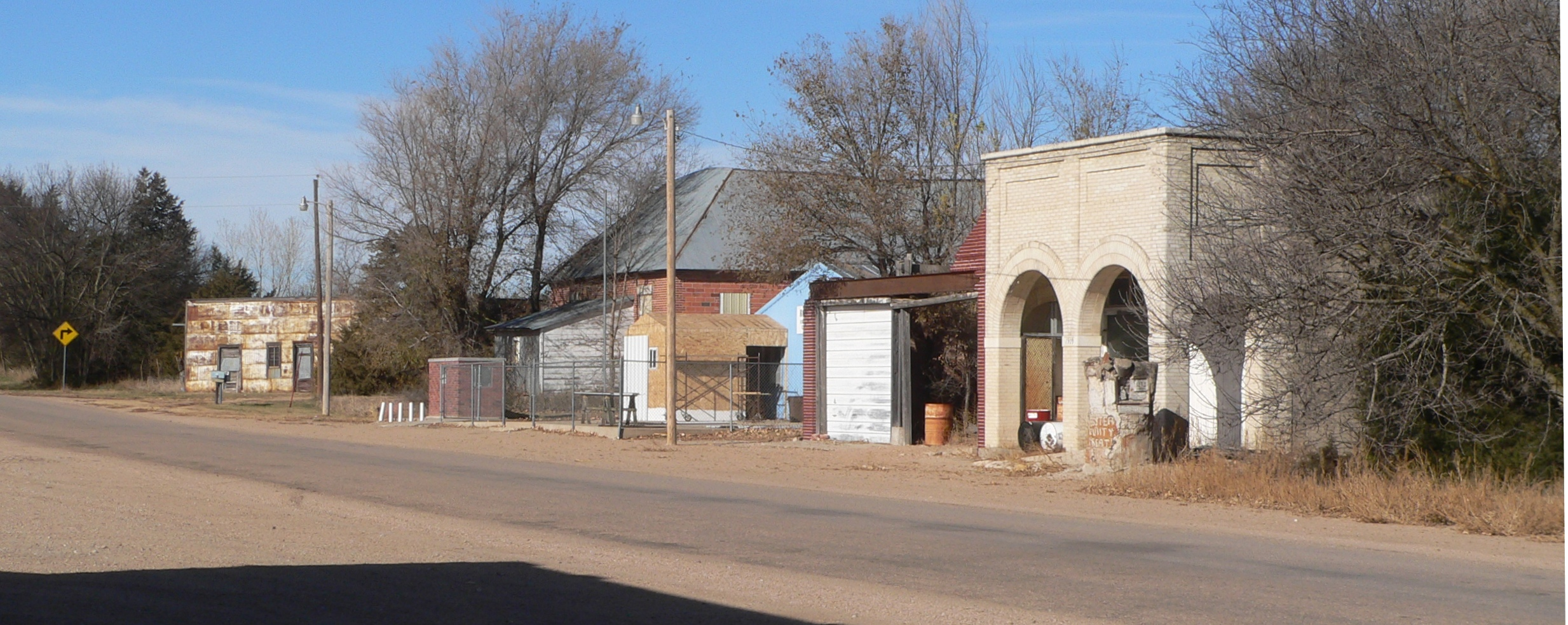
- Main Street in Cowles, November 2012

- Location of Cowles, Nebraska
- Coordinates: 40°10′17″N 98°26′56″W
- Country: United States
- State: Nebraska
- County: Webster

Area
  - Total: 0.56 sq mi (1.44 km^{2})
  - Land: 0.56 sq mi (1.44 km^{2})
  - Water: 0 sq mi (0.00 km^{2})
- Elevation: 1,798 ft (548 m)

Population (2020)
  - Total: 21
  - Density: 37.8/sq mi (14.58/km^{2})
- Time zone: UTC-6 (Central (CST))
  - Summer (DST): UTC-5 (CDT)
- ZIP code: 68930
- Area code: 402
- FIPS code: 31-10985
- GNIS feature ID: 2398640

Cowles is a village in Webster County, Nebraska, United States. As of the 2020 census, Cowles had a population of 21.

== History ==
Cowles was platted in 1878 when the railroad was extended to that point. It was named for railroad official W. D. Cowles. A post office was established in Cowles in 1879, and remained in operation until it was discontinued in 1960.

On March 1, 2026, the Cowles area experienced a 4.1 earthquake. https://earthquake.usgs.gov/earthquakes/eventpage/us7000s1a2/executive

== Geography ==
According to the United States Census Bureau, the village has a total area of 0.56 square miles (1.45 km^{2}), all land.

== Demographics ==
Historical population
Census	Pop.	Note	%±
1920	220		—
1930	224		1.8%
1940	158		−29.5%
1950	130		−17.7%
1960	55		−57.7%
1970	57		3.6%
1980	48		−15.8%
1990	42		−12.5%
2000	48		14.3%
2010	30		−37.5%
2020	21		−30.0%
U.S. Decennial Census

=== 2010 census ===
As of the census of 2010, there were 30 people, 11 households, and 9 families residing in the village. The population density was 53.6 inhabitants per square mile (20.7/km^{2}). There were 13 housing units at an average density of 23.2 per square mile (9.0/km^{2}). The racial makeup of the village was 100.0% White.

There were 11 households, of which 36.4% had children under the age of 18 living with them, 72.7% were married couples living together, 9.1% had a male householder with no wife present, and 18.2% were non-families. 18.2% of all households were made up of individuals. The average household size was 2.73 and the average family size was 3.11.

The median age in the village was 41.5 years. 36.7% of residents were under the age of 18; 0.0% were between the ages of 18 and 24; 20% were from 25 to 44; 16.7% were from 45 to 64; and 26.7% were 65 years of age or older. The gender makeup of the village was 63.3% male and 36.7% female.

=== 2000 census ===
As of the census of 2000, there were 48 people, 18 households, and 12 families residing in the village. The population density was 84.7 inhabitants per square mile (32.7/km^{2}). There were 18 housing units at an average density of 31.8 per square mile (12.3/km^{2}). The racial makeup of the village was 100.00% White.

There were 18 households, out of which 22.2% had children under the age of 18 living with them, 55.6% were married couples living together, 5.6% had a female householder with no husband present, and 33.3% were non-families. 22.2% of all households were made up of individuals, and 11.1% had someone living alone who was 65 years of age or older. The average household size was 2.67 and the average family size was 3.08.

In the village, the population was spread out, with 27.1% under the age of 18, 10.4% from 18 to 24, 22.9% from 25 to 44, 16.7% from 45 to 64, and 22.9% who were 65 years of age or older. The median age was 36 years. For every 100 females, there were 92.0 males. For every 100 females age 18 and over, there were 94.4 males.

As of 2000 the median income for a household in the village was $33,750, and the median income for a family was $36,000. Males had a median income of $10,625 versus $16,563 for females. The per capita income for the village was $9,382. There were 16.7% of families and 43.2% of the population living below the poverty line, including 60.0% of under eighteens and 100.0% of those over 64.

== See also ==
- List of municipalities in Nebraska
