= Webster County, Nebraska =

County in Nebraska, United States

- County
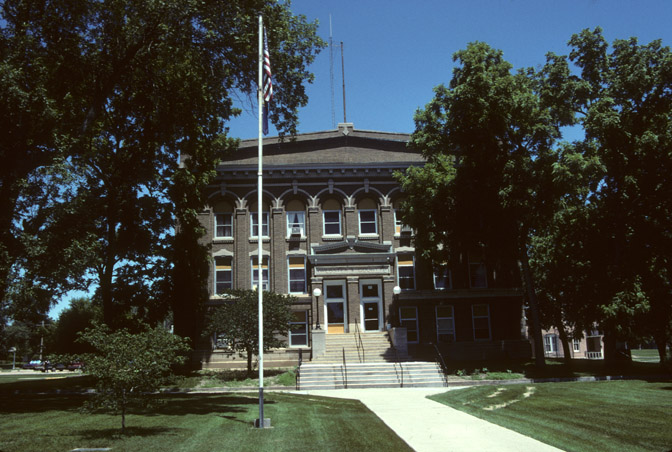
- Webster County Courthouse in Red Cloud

- Location within the U.S. state of Nebraska
- Coordinates: 40°11′N 98°30′W
- Country: United States
- State: Nebraska
- Founded: 1871
- Named for: Daniel Webster
- Seat: Red Cloud
- Largest city: Red Cloud

Area
  - Total: 575 sq mi (1,490 km^{2})
  - Land: 575 sq mi (1,490 km^{2})
  - Water: 0.1 sq mi (0.26 km^{2}) 0.02%

Population (2020)
  - Total: 3,395
  - Estimate (2025): 3,336 ▼
  - Density: 6.1/sq mi (2.4/km^{2})
- Time zone: UTC−6 (Central)
  - Summer (DST): UTC−5 (CDT)
- Congressional district: 3rd
- Website: webstercounty.ne.gov

Webster County is a county in the U.S. state of Nebraska. As of the 2020 United States census, the population was 3,411. Its county seat is Red Cloud. The county was formed in 1871, and was named for Daniel Webster.

In the Nebraska license plate system, Webster County is represented by the prefix 45 (it had the forty-fifth-largest number of vehicles registered in the county when the license plate system was established in 1922).

== Geography ==
Webster County lies along the south line of Nebraska. Its south boundary line abuts the north boundary line of the state of Kansas. The terrain of Webster County consists of low rolling hills, sloping to the east. The more planar areas of the county are used for agriculture, mostly under center pivot irrigation.

The Republican River flows eastward across the lower part of the county. The county has an area of 575 square miles (1,490 km^{2}), of which 575 square miles (1,490 km^{2}) is land and 0.1 square miles (0.26 km^{2}) (0.02%) is water.

=== Major highways ===
- U.S. Highway 136
- U.S. Highway 281
- Nebraska Highway 4
- Nebraska Highway 78

=== Adjacent counties ===
- Adams County - north
- Clay County - northeast
- Nuckolls County - east
- Jewell County, Kansas - southeast
- Smith County, Kansas - southwest
- Franklin County - west
- Kearney County - northwest

=== Protected areas ===
- Indian Creek State Wildlife Management Area
- Liberty Cove Recreation Area

== Demographics ==
Historical population
Census	Pop.	Note	%±
1870	16		—
1880	7,104		44,300.0%
1890	11,210		57.8%
1900	11,619		3.6%
1910	12,008		3.3%
1920	10,922		−9.0%
1930	10,210		−6.5%
1940	8,701		−14.8%
1950	7,395		−15.0%
1960	6,224		−15.8%
1970	5,396		−13.3%
1980	4,858		−10.0%
1990	4,279		−11.9%
2000	4,061		−5.1%
2010	3,812		−6.1%
2020	3,395		−10.9%
2025 (est.)	3,336	▼	−1.7%
US Decennial Census; 1790-1960 1900-1990; 1990-2000 2010-2013

=== 2020 census ===
As of the 2020 census, the county had a population of 3,395. The median age was 45.6 years. 22.5% of residents were under the age of 18 and 23.9% of residents were 65 years of age or older. For every 100 females there were 99.0 males, and for every 100 females age 18 and over there were 98.0 males age 18 and over.

The racial makeup of the county was 93.1% White, 0.4% Black or African American, 0.5% American Indian and Alaska Native, 0.3% Asian, 0.0% Native Hawaiian and Pacific Islander, 1.1% from some other race, and 4.6% from two or more races. Hispanic or Latino residents of any race comprised 4.4% of the population.

0.0% of residents lived in urban areas, while 100.0% lived in rural areas.

There were 1,454 households in the county, of which 27.9% had children under the age of 18 living with them and 22.4% had a female householder with no spouse or partner present. About 31.3% of all households were made up of individuals and 15.4% had someone living alone who was 65 years of age or older.

There were 1,788 housing units, of which 18.7% were vacant. Among occupied housing units, 77.4% were owner-occupied and 22.6% were renter-occupied. The homeowner vacancy rate was 2.1% and the rental vacancy rate was 15.8%.

=== 2000 census ===
As of the 2000 United States census there were 4,061 people, 1,708 households, and 1,118 families residing in the county. The population density was 7 people per square mile (2.7 people/km^{2}). There were 1,972 housing units at an average density of 3 units per square mile (1.2/km^{2}). The racial makeup of the county was 98.10% White, 0.15% Black or African American, 0.27% Native American, 0.47% Asian, 0.07% Pacific Islander, 0.22% from other races, and 0.71% from two or more races. 0.54% of the population were Hispanic or Latino of any race. 50.7% were of German, 9.7% English, 8.3% American and 7.6% Irish ancestry.

There were 1,708 households, out of which 26.80% had children under the age of 18 living with them, 57.70% were married couples living together, 5.00% had a female householder with no husband present, and 34.50% were non-families. 32.60% of all households were made up of individuals, and 17.90% had someone living alone who was 65 years of age or older. The average household size was 2.28 and the average family size was 2.89.

The county population contained 23.60% under the age of 18, 4.60% from 18 to 24, 22.90% from 25 to 44, 24.60% from 45 to 64, and 24.30% who were 65 years of age or older. The median age was 44 years. For every 100 females there were 92.70 males. For every 100 females age 18 and over, there were 91.60 males.

The median income for a household in the county was $30,026, and the median income for a family was $36,513. Males had a median income of $26,555 versus $18,480 for females. The per capita income for the county was $16,802. About 7.70% of families and 11.20% of the population were below the poverty line, including 13.50% of those under age 18 and 10.50% of those age 65 or over.

== Communities ==
=== Cities ===
- Blue Hill
- Red Cloud (county seat)

=== Villages ===
- Bladen
- Cowles
- Guide Rock

=== Census-designated place ===
- Inavale

=== Unincorporated communities ===
- Amboy
- Rosemont

== Politics ==
Webster County voters are reliably Republican. In no national election since 1964 has the county selected the Democratic Party candidate (as of 2024).

United States presidential election results for Webster County, Nebraska
Year	Republican		Democratic		Third party(ies)	
Year	No.	%	No.	%	No.	%
1900	1,355	49.67%	1,322	48.46%	51	1.87%
1904	1,585	61.84%	424	16.54%	554	21.62%
1908	1,408	48.59%	1,354	46.72%	136	4.69%
1912	532	19.25%	1,168	42.26%	1,064	38.49%
1916	1,191	42.98%	1,469	53.01%	111	4.01%
1920	2,599	70.72%	913	24.84%	163	4.44%
1924	2,194	54.40%	1,207	29.93%	632	15.67%
1928	2,924	68.22%	1,342	31.31%	20	0.47%
1932	1,627	37.07%	2,632	59.97%	130	2.96%
1936	1,912	43.77%	2,408	55.13%	48	1.10%
1940	2,847	68.18%	1,329	31.82%	0	0.00%
1944	2,523	69.75%	1,094	30.25%	0	0.00%
1948	1,964	59.00%	1,365	41.00%	0	0.00%
1952	2,719	74.62%	925	25.38%	0	0.00%
1956	2,298	70.62%	956	29.38%	0	0.00%
1960	2,026	64.75%	1,103	35.25%	0	0.00%
1964	1,191	41.82%	1,657	58.18%	0	0.00%
1968	1,521	61.13%	781	31.39%	186	7.48%
1972	1,631	70.09%	696	29.91%	0	0.00%
1976	1,267	51.90%	1,130	46.29%	44	1.80%
1980	1,676	69.75%	547	22.76%	180	7.49%
1984	1,694	71.93%	645	27.39%	16	0.68%
1988	1,314	59.03%	891	40.03%	21	0.94%
1992	973	42.98%	625	27.61%	666	29.42%
1996	1,094	55.96%	621	31.76%	240	12.28%
2000	1,302	66.94%	584	30.03%	59	3.03%
2004	1,403	70.08%	557	27.82%	42	2.10%
2008	1,233	67.86%	552	30.38%	32	1.76%
2012	1,258	72.22%	442	25.37%	42	2.41%
2016	1,330	77.87%	306	17.92%	72	4.22%
2020	1,511	80.54%	335	17.86%	30	1.60%
2024	1,449	82.10%	296	16.77%	20	1.13%

As of 2021, county elected officials include:

- Commissioners:
  - District 1: Dan Shipman
  - District 2: Trevor Karr
  - District 3: TJ Vance
  - District 4: Tim Gilbert
  - District 5: Gary Ratzlaff
- Sheriff: Troy Schmitz

== See also ==
- National Register of Historic Places listings in Webster County, Nebraska
