= Rosemont, Nebraska =

Unincorporated community in Nebraska, U.S.

Coordinates: 40°17′13″N 98°21′51″W

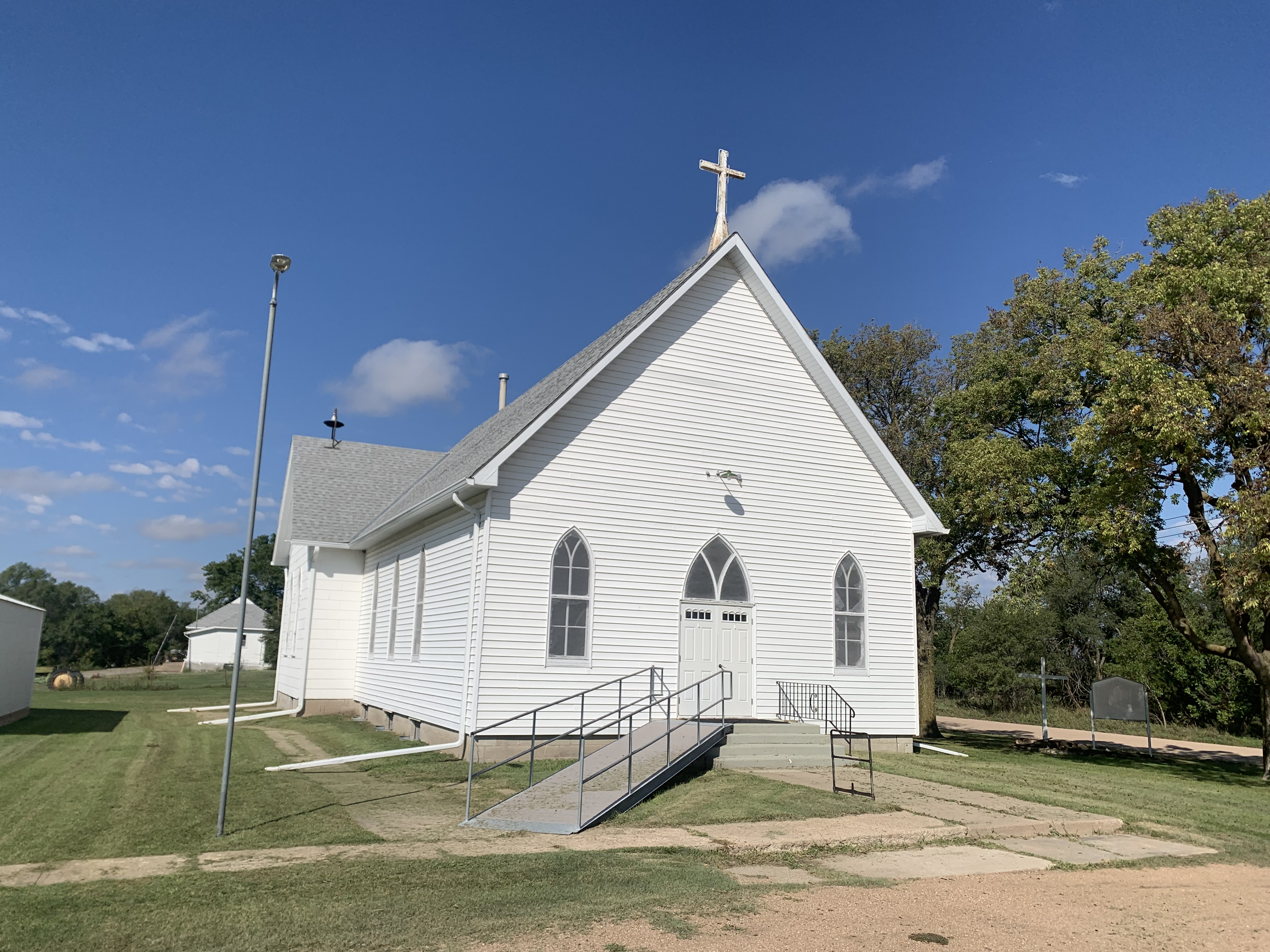
Calvary Lutheran Church in Rosemont, Nebraska

Rosemont is an unincorporated community in Webster County, Nebraska, United States.

== History ==
A post office was established at Rosemont in 1890, and remained in operation until it was discontinued in 1955. Rosemont was named for Claus Rose, Sr., the original owner of the town site.
