= Madeira (ship) =

Barge that sank in Lake Superior in 1905

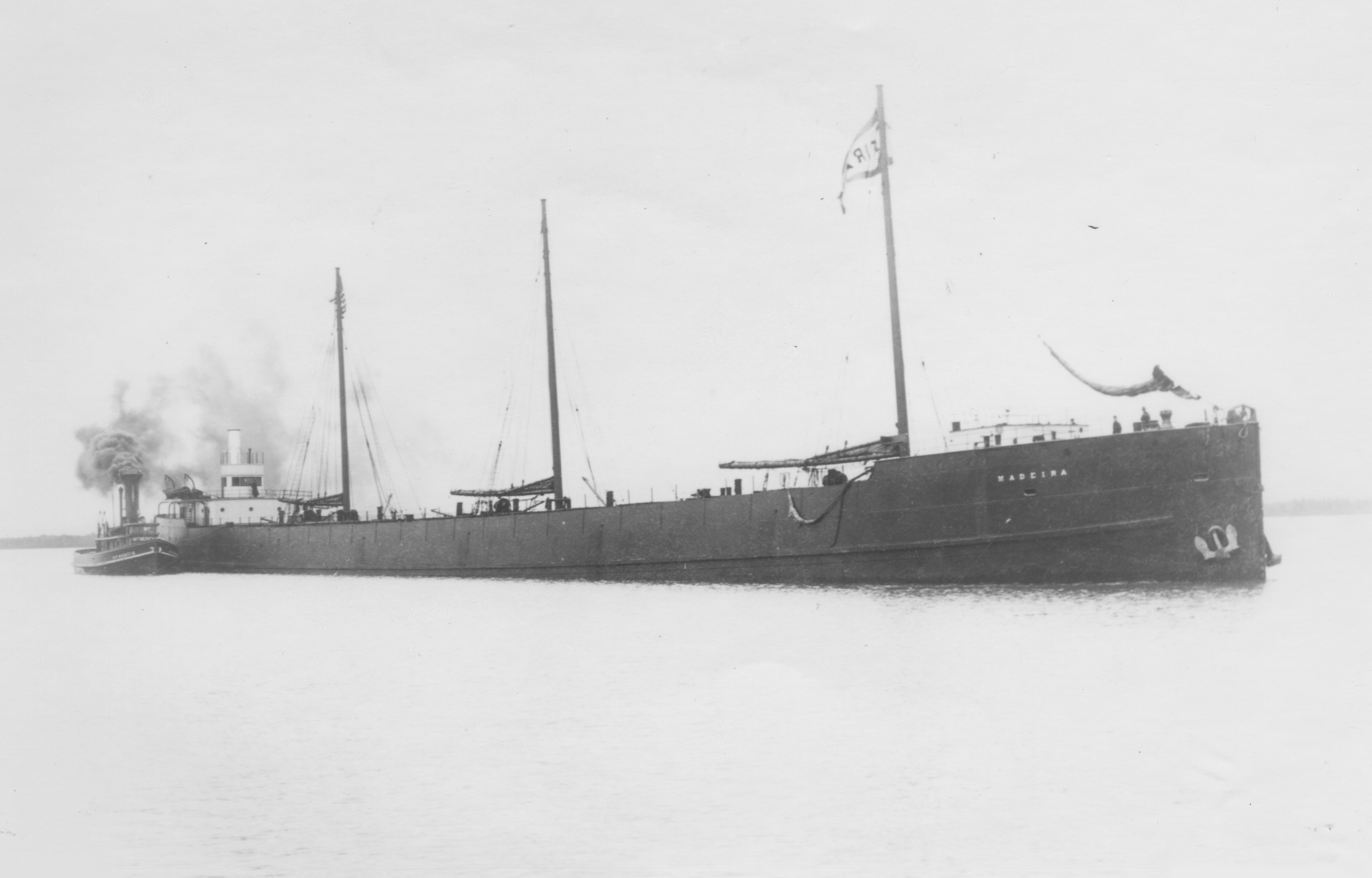
- Madeira, off the starboard bow, c. 1900–1905

History
- Laid down: 1900
- Launched: 1900
- Fate: Sank November 28, 1905

General characteristics
- Length: 436 ft (133 m)
- Beam: 50 ft (15 m)
- Propulsion: Towed by a steam-powered freighter with sails on three masts for assistance
- Madeira (Schooner-Barge) Shipwreck
- U.S. National Register of Historic Places
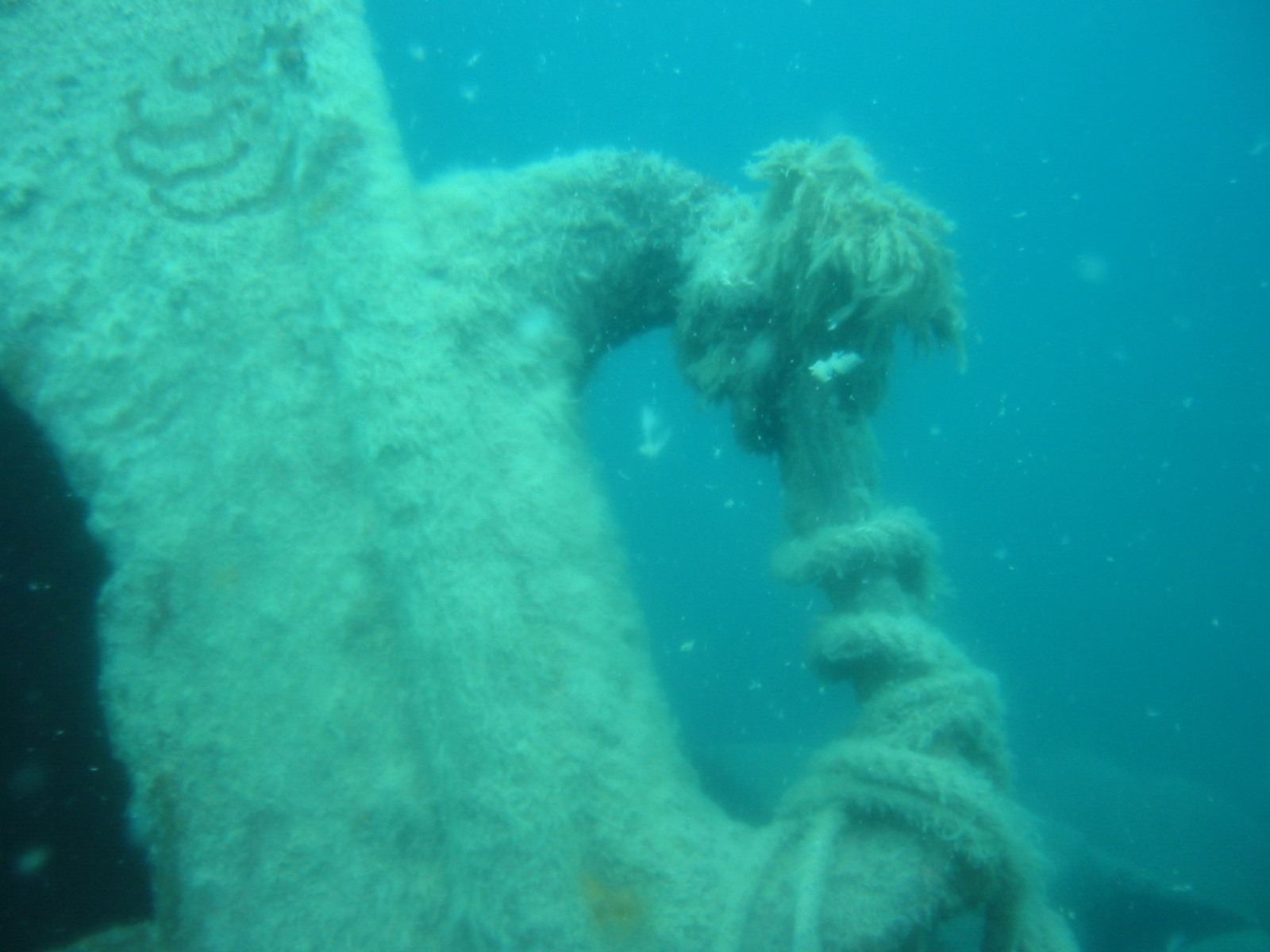
- A closeup of the port bow fairlead on the wreck of Madeira

- Location within Minnesota Location within the United States
- Nearest city: Beaver Bay, Minnesota
- Coordinates: 47°12′22″N 91°21′29″W
- Built: 1900
- Architect: Chicago Shipbuilding Co.
- MPS: Minnesota's Lake Superior Shipwrecks MPS
- NRHP reference No.: 92000843
- Added to NRHP: July 23, 1992

Madeira was a schooner barge that sank off the coast of Minnesota in Lake Superior on November 28, 1905. A schooner barge is a type of ship that functions like a barge, in that it is towed by a steamship, but also has sails like a schooner. This type of ship evolved from wooden sailing ships that were cut down into barges and towed behind wooden steamships, a practice which originated in the late 1880s in coastal areas. This design was commonly used in the Great Lakes for transporting grain, iron ore, and other products.

== History ==
Madeira was built at the Chicago yard of the Chicago Shipbuilding Company in 1900 primarily of heavy steel plates that were riveted together, with wood joinery used in other places. The ship had a flat plate keel and was shaped very flat and full to maximize cargo capacity. The career of the ship is mostly unknown, except for some notoriety gained when it struck the former Sault Ste. Marie International Bridge at Sault Ste. Marie, Michigan in 1902.

== Final voyage ==
On November 28, 1905, Madeira, under tow of the steamer William Edenborn, was caught in a fierce storm with winds around 70 to 80 miles per hour, blowing snow onto the deck and kicking up huge swells. The captain of William Edenborn feared the loss of his ship and made the decision to cut the Madeira loose. Some speculated at the time that the crew tried to set anchor and ride out the storm, but the wreck site later revealed that both anchors were still intact at the bow. About two hours after it was cut loose, Madeira crashed into a cliff named Gold Rock. One of the crewmen leapt to shore with a safety line and was able to bring eight other men to safety. The first mate went down with the ship. Two days later, the tugboat Edna G rescued the stranded crewmen.

== Wreck ==
In 1955, divers from the Frigid Frogs dive club in Duluth, Minnesota, first explored the wreck, but reported that there was little or no treasure on board. In 1960, a salvage company purchased the rights to the ship from the Pittsburgh Steamship Division of U.S. Steel Corporation. Divers removed one of the anchors and the ship's wheel, which were sold to the nearby Split Rock Trading Post. In 1974, a wrecking crew spent significant effort salvaging steel from Madeira. The ship currently lies broken in three sections. The bow is upside-down in 40 to 50 feet (12 to 15 meters) of water, and the stern, containing a large steam winch and open hatches, lies on its starboard side at 65 feet (20 meters). A small, roofless pilot house is at 75 feet (23 meters).
