= SS Mataafa =

Steam freighter that sank in Lake Superior

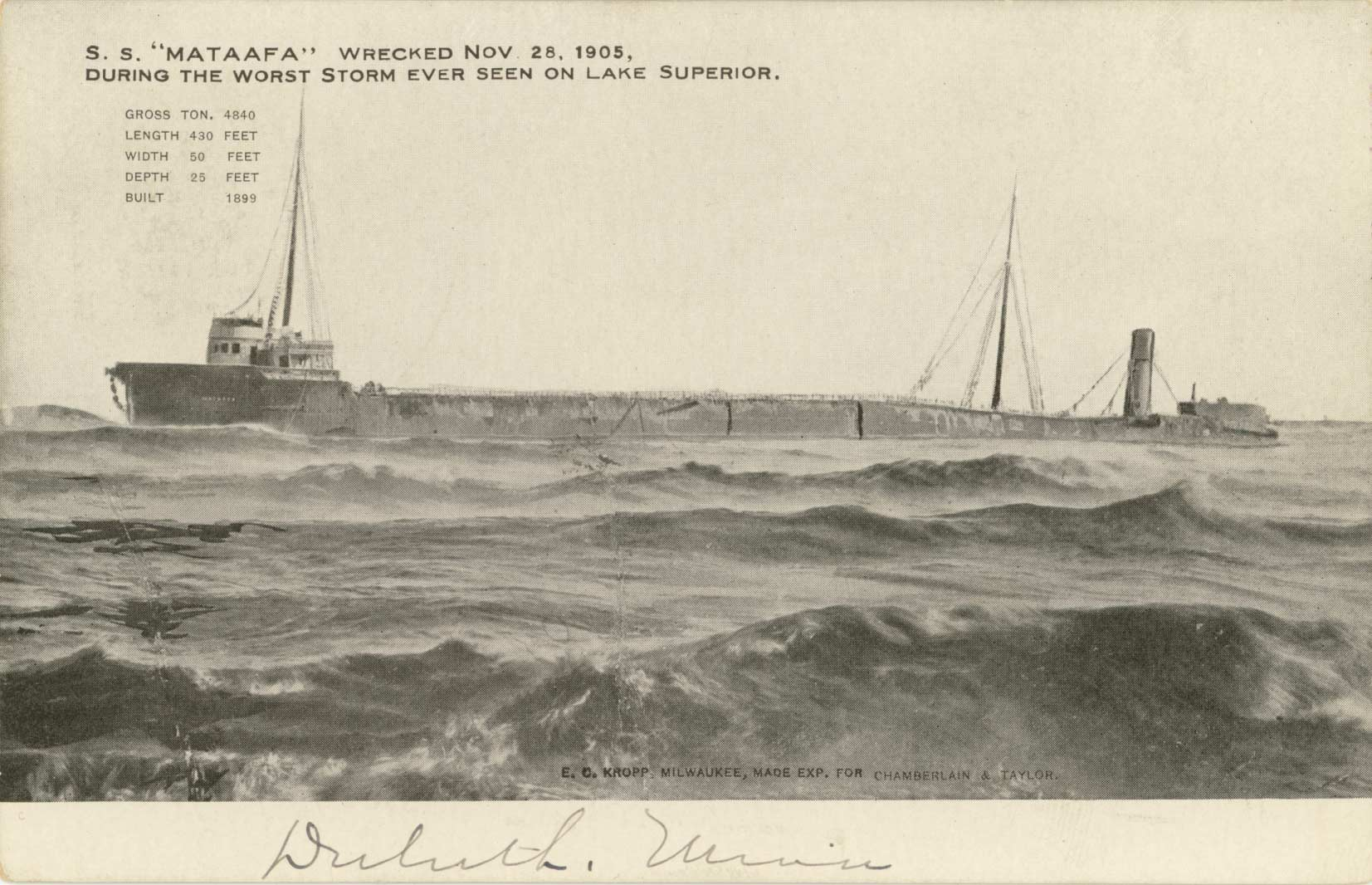
- Mataafa wrecked outside Duluth harbor after the storm of November 28, 1905

History
- Name: SS Mataafa
- Builder: Cleveland Shipbuilding Company
- Completed: 1899
- Out of service: 1965
- Fate: Wrecked 1905, raised and repaired; scrapped 1965

General characteristics
- Tonnage: 4,840 GRT
- Length: 430 ft (130 m)
- Beam: 50 ft (15 m)
- Depth: 25 ft (7.6 m)
- Installed power: 1,800 hp (1,300 kW)
- Crew: 24 in 1905

SS Mataafa was an American steamship that had a lengthy career on the Great Lakes of North America, first as a bulk carrier and later as a car carrier. She was wrecked in 1905 in Lake Superior just outside the harbor at Duluth, Minnesota, during a storm that was named after her. She was built as SS Pennsylvania in 1899, and renamed Mataafa when she was purchased in the same year by the Minnesota Steamship Company. After her 1905 wreck, she was raised and repaired, and served for another sixty years before being scrapped.

== Design ==
Built in 1899 as SS Pennsylvania by the Cleveland Shipbuilding Company, she was 430 feet (130 m) long and had a beam of 50 feet (15 m). She was rated at 4,840 gross register tons (GRT), and her engines were capable of producing 1,800 horsepower (1,300 kW). Like most steel ships on the Great Lakes, her hull was made of large steel plates riveted to steel frames.

== Early career ==
The company that built her leased her out as SS Pennsylvania for a few months, but quickly sold her to the Minnesota Steamship Company (MSC), which renamed her SS Mataafa. Her first season with the MSC was not without difficulties; she struck a rock in the Straits of Mackinac and arrived at Chicago, Illinois, with a leak, and then ran aground above the Soo Locks on her way back to Minnesota.

In 1901, she became a part of the original Pittsburgh Steamship Division of U.S. Steel when the division was formed. Due to fog, she ran aground again, this time on Knife Island Reef in Lake Superior, on June 2, 1902.

== Wreck ==
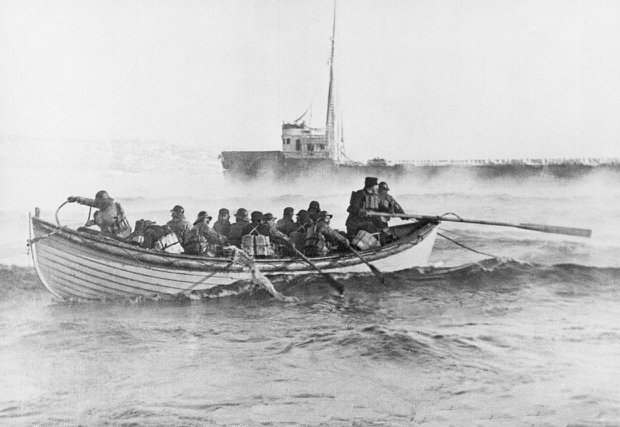
A United States Life-Saving Service crew rowing out to rescue survivors from the wreck of SS Mataafa, which is visible in the background, on November 29, 1905.

At three-thirty in the afternoon of November 27, 1905, she was on her way out of Duluth, Minnesota, loaded with iron ore and towing the barge James Nasmyth. According to Captain Richard F. Humble, they were rounding the Apostle Islands when a nor'easter hit. After hours of fighting the storm, Humble decided to turn back to safe port in Two Harbors, Minnesota. After five more hours of struggling with the nor'easter, the ship made it back to Two Harbors, but was unable to enter the harbor due to the darkness. Her only remaining option was to try to make port at Duluth.

As she approached Duluth, it became clear that it was useless to try to bring both the steamer and the barge through the narrow Duluth Ship Canal into the harbor, so Captain Humble gave the order to cut loose James Nasmyth, after which Mataafa attempted to make it into the harbor alone. She made it about half-way between the twin concrete piers when a backwater surged out. Heavy water struck her stern, driving her prow down to the muddy bottom, and then slammed her stern against the north pier. Her rudder tore off and the water pulled her prow out toward the open lake, then smashed her stern against the south pier. She grounded in the shallow water outside the north pier, where she broke in two, her stern settling slowly into the water.

When the ship broke in two, twelve men were in the after portion. Three of the men struggled out to the forward part of the ship. The nine who remained aboard the after portion died of exposure during the night; one of the bodies in the after half had to be chopped out of solid ice. The fifteen men in the fore half fared better; although rescue attempts were futile during the stormy night, the next day a small boat made it out, and all fifteen were taken off in two boatloads.

== Later career ==
Mataafa was refloated and repaired. She continued to be accident-prone; On October 14, 1908, she was in a collision that sank SS Sacramento in the harbor at Duluth, Minnesota., On 1 October, 1910 she rescued the crew of New York after the ship burned and sank in Thunder Bay, Michigan, Lake Huron, and in 1914 she struck another pier. She did play the heroic part on a few occasions, however; on July 17, 1912, she rescued 19 men from the sinking wooden steamer New York in Lake St. Clair, and on the same day six years later she rescued the entire crew of the barge Commodore off South East Shoal in Lake Erie.

She was rebuilt due to wear in 1926, and in 1946 she was converted from a bulk carrier to a car carrier, after which she served the Nicholson Transit Company. She served until 1964, when she was sold to Marine Salvage to be scrapped. She was dismantled in Hamburg, West Germany, in 1965.

== Legacy ==
Because the wreck of Mataafa occurred just outside Duluth, hundreds if not thousands of people were witnesses to the event. This made the wreck of Mataafa famous enough for the November 1905 storm to become known as the "Mataafa Storm." The Duluth Cigar Company quickly capitalized on the wreck with the "Mataafa" Cigar, which bore a picture of the wrecked bulk carrier.

== See also ==
- Graveyard of the Great Lakes
