= The Amboy Dukes =

The Amboy Dukes may refer to:

- The Amboy Dukes (novel), 1947 American novel about juvenile delinquents
- The Amboy Dukes (band), American rock band founded 1964
  - The Amboy Dukes (album), 1967 album by that band
