= Amboy Township =

Amboy Township may refer to:

- Amboy Township, Lee County, Illinois
- Amboy Township, Michigan
- Amboy Township, Minnesota
- Amboy Township, Fulton County, Ohio
