= Amboy, Nebraska =

Unincorporated community in Nebraska, United States

- Unincorporated Community
- Location within Nebraska Location within the United States
- Coordinates: 40°05′25″N 98°26′19″W
- Country: United States
- State: Nebraska
- County: Webster
- Founded: 1876

Amboy is an unincorporated community in Webster County, Nebraska, United States.

== History ==
Amboy was founded circa 1876. A post office was established at Amboy in 1879, and remained in operation until it was discontinued in 1890. The Amboy station was at the junction of two railroads.
