= Mataafa Storm =

1905 storm system

Mataafa Storm (1905)
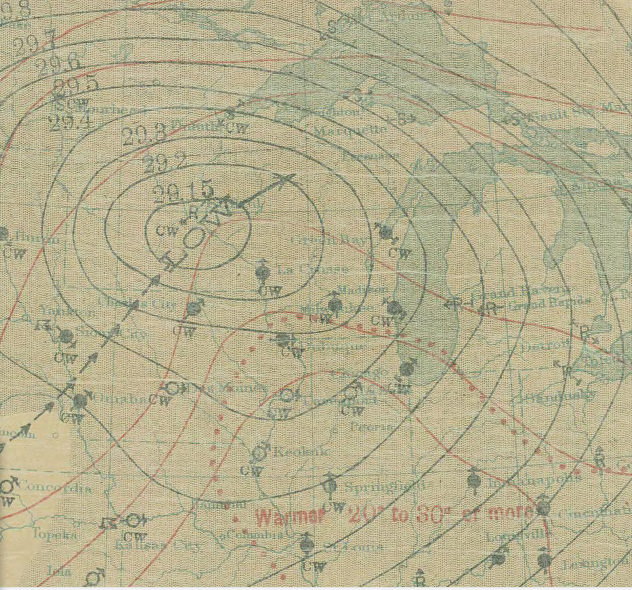
- Weather map of an extratropical cyclone approaching the Great Lakes on the morning of November 28, 1905

Meteorological history
- Formed: November 25, 1905
- Dissipated: November 29, 1905

Extratropical cyclone
- Lowest pressure: <991 mbar (hPa)

Overall effects
- Fatalities: 36 (Note: Other sources say likely more)
- Damage: $3,567,000
- Areas affected: Plains, Great Lakes

The Mataafa Storm of 1905 was a storm that occurred on the Great Lakes on November 27–28, 1905. The system moved across the Great Basin with moderate depth on November 26 and November 27, then east-northeastward across the Great Lakes on November 28. Fresh east winds were forecast for the afternoon and evening of November 27, with storm warnings in effect by the morning of November 28. Storm-force winds and heavy snows accompanied the cyclone's passage. The storm, named after the steamship Mataafa, ended up destroying or damaging over 20-30 vessels, killing 36 seamen, and causing shipping losses of US$ 3/5 million (1905 dollars) on Lake Superior.

== Weather and forecast ==
A storm system moving through the Great Basin on November 26 and 27 was forecast to bring "fresh easterly winds" to the Great Lakes during the afternoon and evening on November 27 by the United States Weather Bureau. At 6 p.m., winds at Duluth, Minnesota, had reached 44 miles per hour (71 km/h). Storm warning flags were flying by the morning of November 28 as the cyclone moved into southern Minnesota. At this time, easterly gales and heavy snows had spread across Lake Superior, Lake Huron, and Lake Erie. Five-minute winds reached 68 mph (109 km/h) at Duluth during the early morning of November 28, before dropping below gale force by noon. At Duluth Harbor, lake levels peaked at 2.3 feet (0.70 m) above normal during the storm. The system brought heavy snows within its northern and western side across the northern Great Lakes on November 28 and November 29, with storm warnings continuing for the lower Great Lakes on the morning of November 29.

== The wreck of SS Mataafa ==
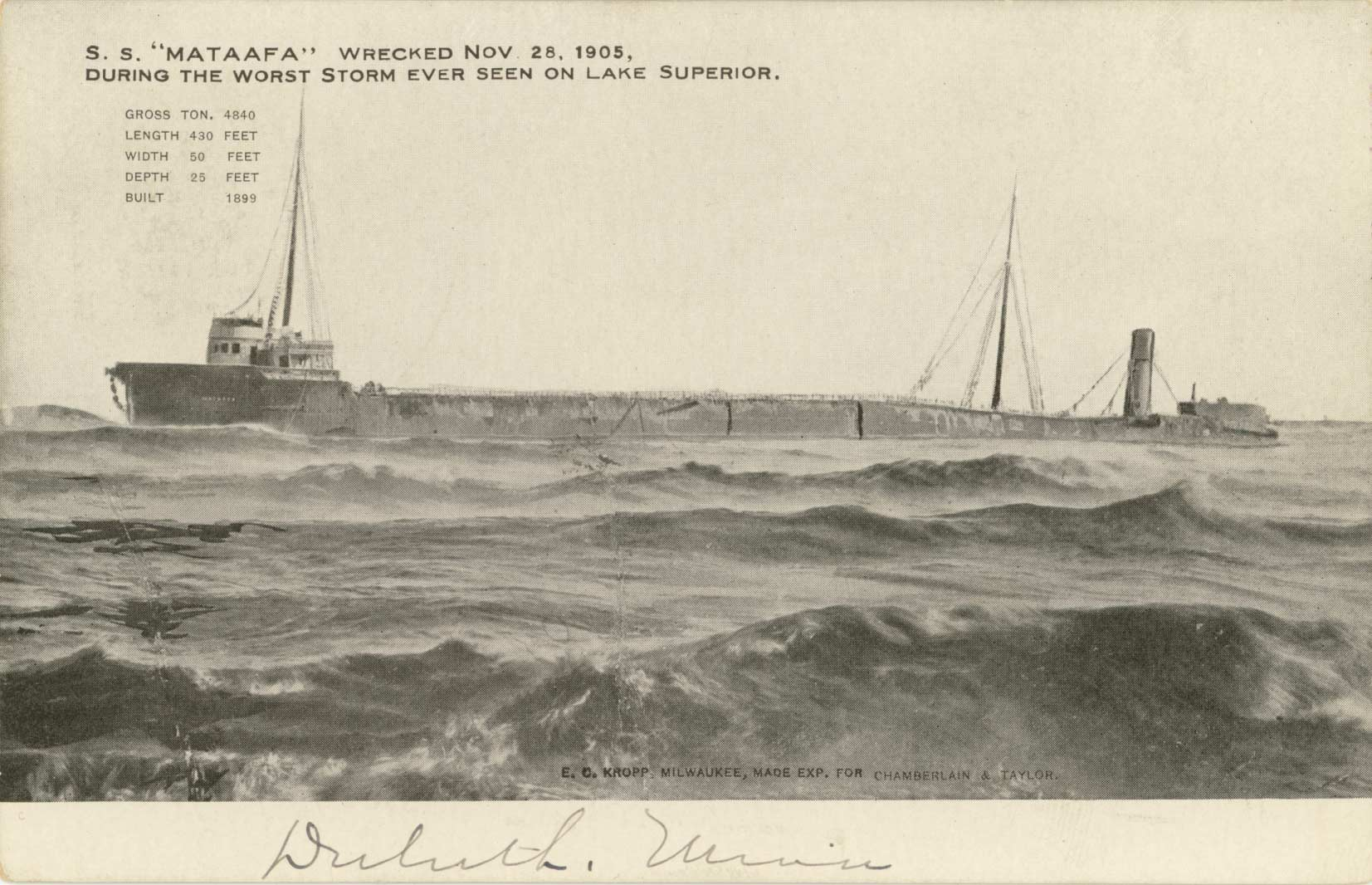
The wreck of Mataafa.

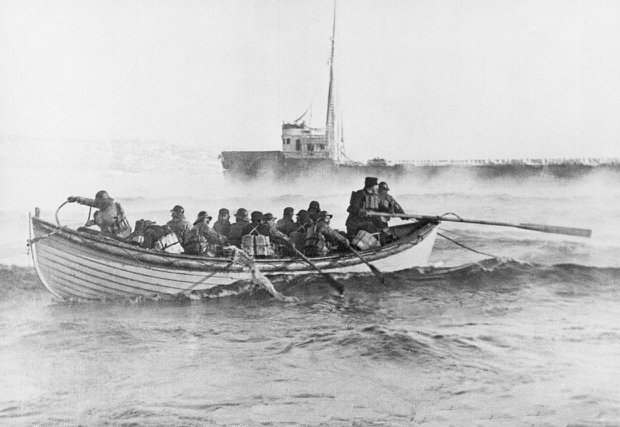
A United States Lifesaving Service crew rowing out to rescue the survivors aboard the wreck of SS Mataafa, visible in the background, on November 29, 1905.

At five o'clock in the afternoon on November 27, 1905, the bulk carrier SS Mataafa was on her way out of Duluth, loaded with iron ore and towing the barge James Nasmyth. She was hit by the storm, and though she struggled on for a short time, by the time she had reached Two Harbors, Minnesota, at 4:00 p.m. the next day, it was clear to her master, Captain R. F. Humble, that she could not make the run. He gave the order to turn about, and she turned her prow toward Duluth.

As she approached the port, it became clear that it was useless to try to bring both steamer and barge through the narrow Duluth Ship Canal into the harbor, so the Captain Humble gave the order to cut James Nasmyth loose. Then Mataafa attempted to make it into safe harbor alone. She made it about half-way between the twin concrete piers when a backwater surged out. Heavy water struck her stern, driving her prow down to the muddy bottom, and then slammed her stern against the north pier. Her rudder tore off and the water pulled her prow out toward the open lake, then smashed her stern against the south pier. She grounded in the shallow water outside the north pier, where she broke in two, her stern settling slowly into the water.

When the ship broke in two, twelve men were in the aft portion; three of them struggled to the forward portion. The remaining nine remained aboard the after portion and died of exposure during the night; one of the bodies in the after half had to be chopped out of solid ice. The fifteen men in the fore half fared better; although rescue attempts were futile during the stormy night, the next day a small boat made it out, and all fifteen were taken off in two boatloads.

== Other shipping impact ==
By noon on Sunday, November 26, 1905, the steamer Butler emerged from the St. Clair River into Lake Huron. The sky was gray and overcast. For the rest of the day, Butler steamed north across Lake Huron. On the morning of Monday, November 27, the steamer Joseph G. Butler, Jr. passed Detour Reef Light and entered the Saint Marys River. Monday afternoon, Butler cleared the Soo Locks, just behind the steamer Bransford. That afternoon, the temperature was 28 degrees F (-2 degrees C). As the two steamers headed across Whitefish Bay, the barometer started downward, then plummeted, and the snow thickened. By dusk, the lookouts could barely make out the light at Whitefish Point as they cleared the bay into the body of Lake Superior. Here Bransford turned northward to follow the Canadian shore to stay north of the storm. Butler turned southwestward to take the shorter distance and pressed through the storm.

As Butler sighted the Caribou Island Light, the shuddering of the ship changed. The continuous pounding of the waves on the side of the ship became interspersed with a violent shaking. Down in the engine room, the chief engineer knew that the vibration was from the propellers rising out of the water as a trough between waves running up to 10 and 20 feet (3 and 6.5 meters). First the propeller would rise out of the water, and then the spinning blades would crash back into the water. This kind of pounding could open every seam in the vessel. It became his job to stop the blades every time they rose out of the water and get them going again once they were below the surface. If the ship were to lose headway, it would be at the mercy of the storm, but if the vibrations weren’t stopped, the ship would come apart on its own. The next obstacle was Keweenaw Point jutting out into the open lake. The steward reported that the windows were out in the mess and there was 2 feet (61 cm) of water rushing back and forth.

All day Tuesday the 28th, Butler fought the boiling seas. At one point, with land not seen and fear of approaching a point of land, Butler turned to run with the storm, hoping to clear any unseen shoreline. Late that day, the storm began to abate, and when the captain could once again see across the lake, the light at Outer Island in the Apostles was spotted. Now a new course was set to make for Duluth. The seas were still high, but the wind had let up and the snow had stopped. Some fifty hours out of Lorain, Butler was once again on a steady course for Duluth. As she came abreast of Two Harbors, Minnesota, she spotted Bransford making for Duluth. Further ahead she sighted another steamer, which turned out to be Perry G. Walker, which had sailed from Duluth just two days earlier.

Approaching Duluth, Butler sighted more freighters. James Nasmyth was anchored out from Minnesota Point, sitting low in the water with a load of iron ore and a thick coating of ice. Then Butler sighted Mataafa, sitting in the shallows of Minnesota Point and split into several parts. It was noon as Butler steamed through the canal into St. Louis Bay, sighting R. W. England lying beached on the backside of Minnesota Point, a victim of the high winds the day before.

== The wrecks of November 28 ==
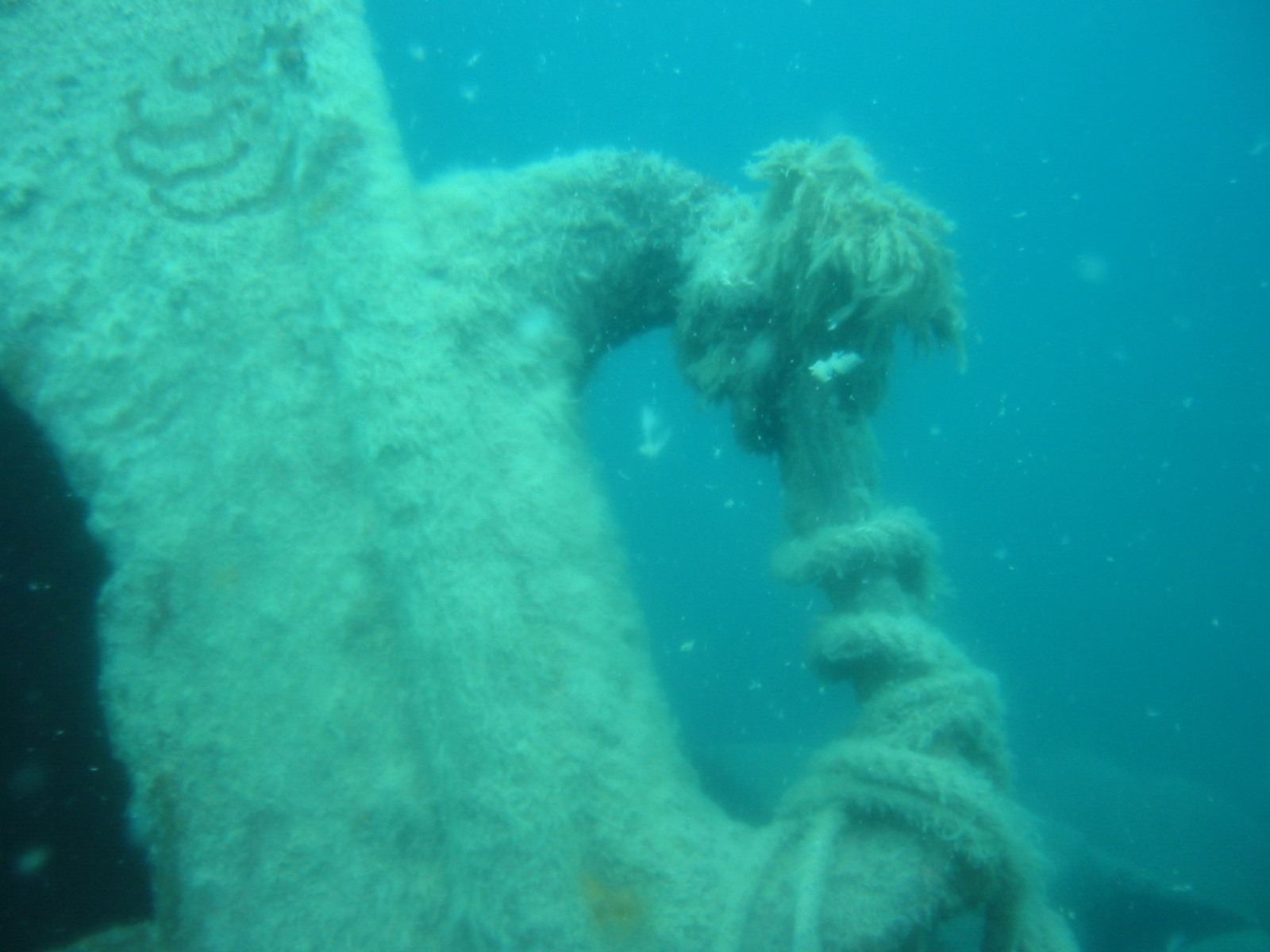
Rigging on the wreck of Madeira, September 7, 2007.

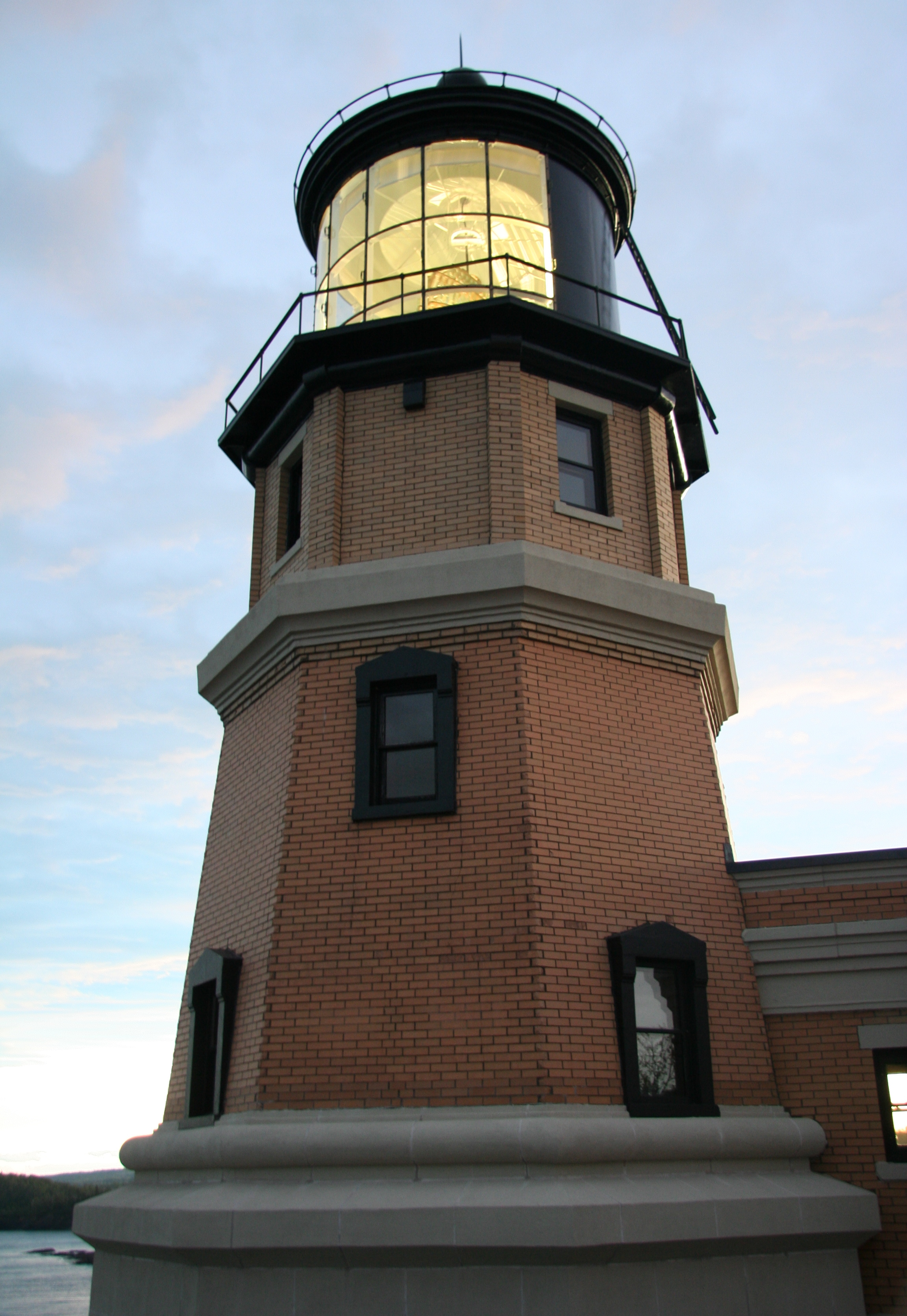
Split Rock Lighthouse illuminated at sunset on September 3, 2010.

Ship	Shipping Line	Refuge/Wreck Site	Damage
Isaac Ellwood (steamer)	Pittsburgh Steamship	Duluth	aground
Mataafa (steamer)	Pittsburgh Steamship	Duluth	aground
R. W. England (steamer)	Tomlinson	Duluth	
Crescent City (steamer)	Pittsburgh Steamship	Lakewood (7 m NE of Duluth)	aground against cliffs
Lafayette (steamer)	Pittsburgh Steamship	Encampment Island (7 m NE of Two Harbors, Minnesota)	‘broken up’
Manila (barge of Lafayette)	Pittsburgh Steamship	Encampment Island (7 m NE of Two Harbors)	aground
William Edenborn (steamer)	Pittsburgh Steamship	nr Split Rock River	hard ashore & broken in two
Madeira (barge of Edenborn)	Pittsburgh Steamship	Gold Rock (3 mi NE)	sunk and broken in two
George Herbert (scow)		Two Island, nr Schroeder, Minnesota	smashed to pieces
George Spencer (wooden steamer)		Thomasville (nr Tofte, Minnesota)	hard aground
Amboy (barge of Spencer)			hard aground
Monkshaven (steamer)		Pie Island, Port Arthur, Ontario	on the rocks
William E. Corey (steamer)	Pittsburgh Steamship	Gull Island (Apostles)	stranded
Western Star (steamer)		Fourteen-Mile Point nr Ontonagon, Michigan	stranded tight
Coralia (steamer)	Pittsburgh Steamship	Point Isabelle (east side Keweenaw Peninsula)	‘hung-up’
Maia (barge of Coralia)	Pittsburgh Steamship	Point Isabelle (east side Keweenaw Peninsula)	‘hung-up’
Ira H. Owen (steamer)	National Steamship	NE of Outer Island (Apostles)	foundered
Perry G. Walker (steamer)		Two Harbors	Badly damaged deck house
Vega (steamer)	Gilchrist Transportation Co.	South or North? side of Fox Island	'broke in two and pounded to pieces'
J.H. Outhwaite (wooden steamer)	W.C. Richardson	Straits of Mackinac	Driven ashore and burned down.

== Aftermath ==
Split Rock Lighthouse was built on Lake Superior, off Silver Bay, Minnesota, because of the storm. The Mataafa storm also spawned Vincent v. Erie, a case which has remained a staple of first year torts classes.

== See also ==
- 1940 Armistice Day Blizzard
- Great Lakes Storm of 1913
- Great Storms of the North American Great Lakes
- List of shipwrecks in 1905
- Madeira (shipwreck)
- SS Mataafa
- SS Ira H. Owen
