= SS Ira H. Owen =

American lake freighter lost in the Mataafa Storm of 1905

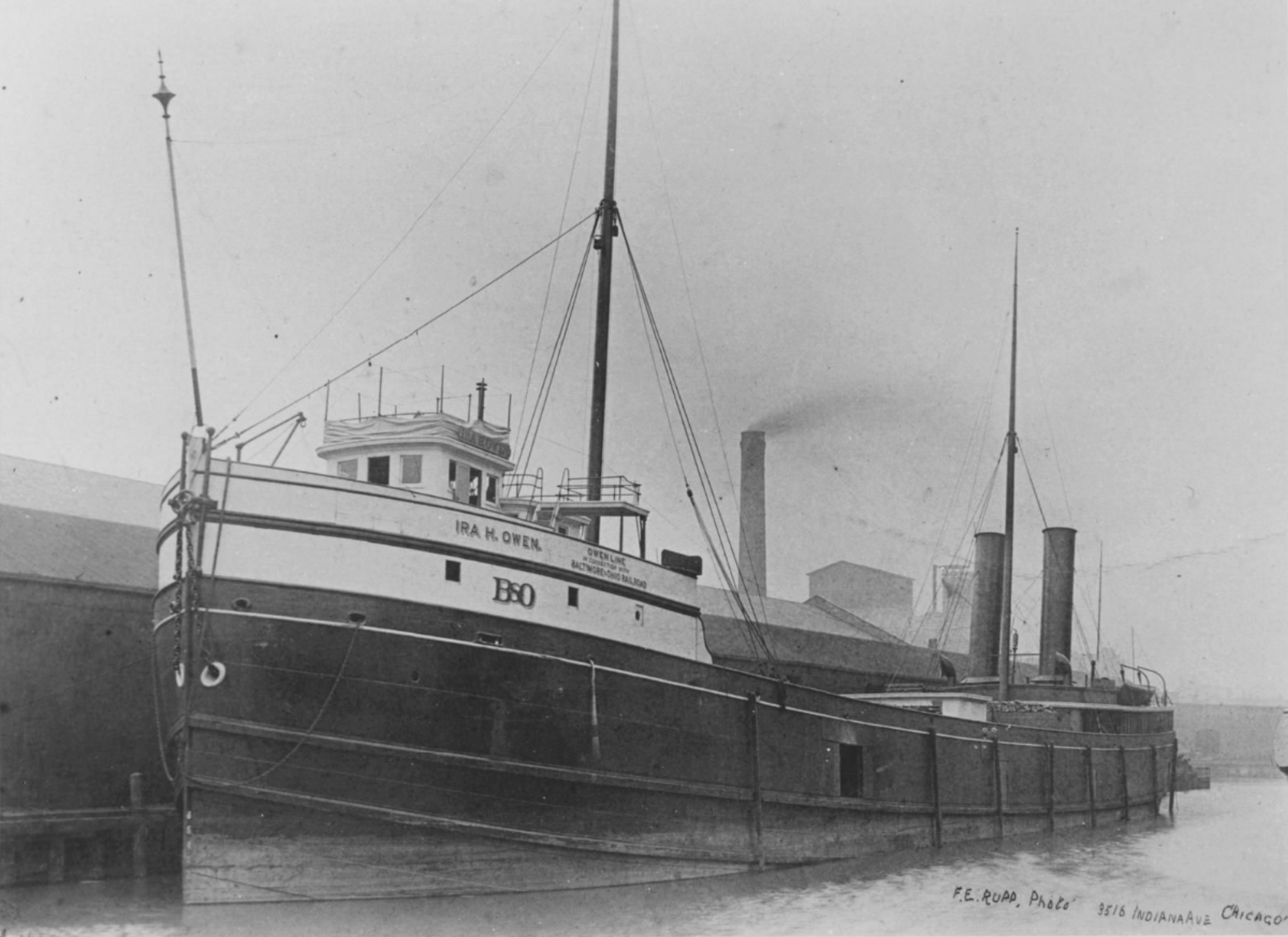
- Ira H. Owen before she was sold to the National Steamship Company

History

United States
- Name: Ira H. Owen
- Operator: Owen Line (1887–1899); National Steamship Company (1899–1905)
- Port of registry: Chicago, Illinois, United States
- Builder: Globe Iron Works Company of Cleveland, Ohio
- Yard number: 14
- Launched: July 7, 1887
- In service: 1887
- Out of service: November 28, 1905
- Identification: US official number 100410
- Fate: Sank in the Mataafa Storm on Lake Superior

General characteristics
- Class & type: Lake freighter
- Tonnage: 1,753.22 GRT; 1,497.77 NRT
- Length: 278.3 feet (84.8 m) LOA; 262 feet (80 m) LBP
- Beam: 39 feet (12 m)
- Depth: 19 feet (5.8 m)
- Installed power: Engine: 1 × 750 hp (560 kW) 85 rpm fore and aft compound steam engine; Boilers: 2 × 112 pounds per square inch (770 kPa) Scotch marine boilers
- Propulsion: 1 × fixed pitch propeller
- Crew: 19

SS Ira H. Owen was a steel-hulled American lake freighter in service between 1887 and 1905. One of the first steel lake freighters, she was built in 1887 in Cleveland, Ohio, by the Globe Iron Works Company, and was built for the Owen Line of Chicago, Illinois. Early in her career, Ira H. Owen carried iron ore from Escanaba, Michigan. In April 1898, Ira H. Owen was chartered by the Baltimore & Ohio Railroad. She was sold to the National Steamship Company of Chicago, on December 30, 1899, for whom she frequently carried coal and grain. Throughout her career, Ira H. Owen was involved in multiple accidents and incidents.

On the morning of November 28, 1905, Ira H. Owen left Duluth, Minnesota, with a "light load" of 116,000 bushels of barley bound for Buffalo, New York. As she passed the Apostle Islands, the weather conditions were deteriorating, but her captain opted not to seek shelter. As Ira H. Owen was passing Outer Island, she was hit by the full force of what would become the Mataafa Storm. She was spotted by Captain Alva Keller of the freighter Harold B. Nye, and appeared to be in trouble; Harold B. Nye, however, was unable to assist Ira H. Owen. The snow eventually blocked Ira H. Owen from Captain Keller's view. After the storm had passed, he looked for Ira H. Owen with his binoculars, but was unable to locate her.

On December 1, the freighter Sir William Siemens located wreckage from Ira H. Owen, 12 miles (19.3 km) east of Michigan Island. None of Ira H. Owen's 19 crewmen survived, and her wreck has not been located.

== History ==
=== Background ===
Although Merchant was the first iron-hulled merchant ship built entirely within the Great Lakes, the gunship USS Michigan, built in 1843, in Erie, Pennsylvania, was the first iron-hulled vessel built on the lakes. Beginning in the mid-1840s, Canadian companies began importing iron vessels, prefabricated by shipyards in the United Kingdom. However, it would not be until 1862 that the first iron-hulled merchant ship was built on the Great Lakes. Despite the success of Merchant, wooden vessels remained preferable to iron ones until the 1880s, due to their inexpensiveness and the abundance of timber. In the early 1880s, shipyards around the lakes began construction of iron ships on a relatively large scale; in 1882, Onoko, an iron freighter, temporarily became the largest ship on the lakes. In 1884, the first steel freighters were built on the Great Lakes, and by the 1890s, the majority of ships constructed on the lakes were made of steel.

=== Design and construction ===
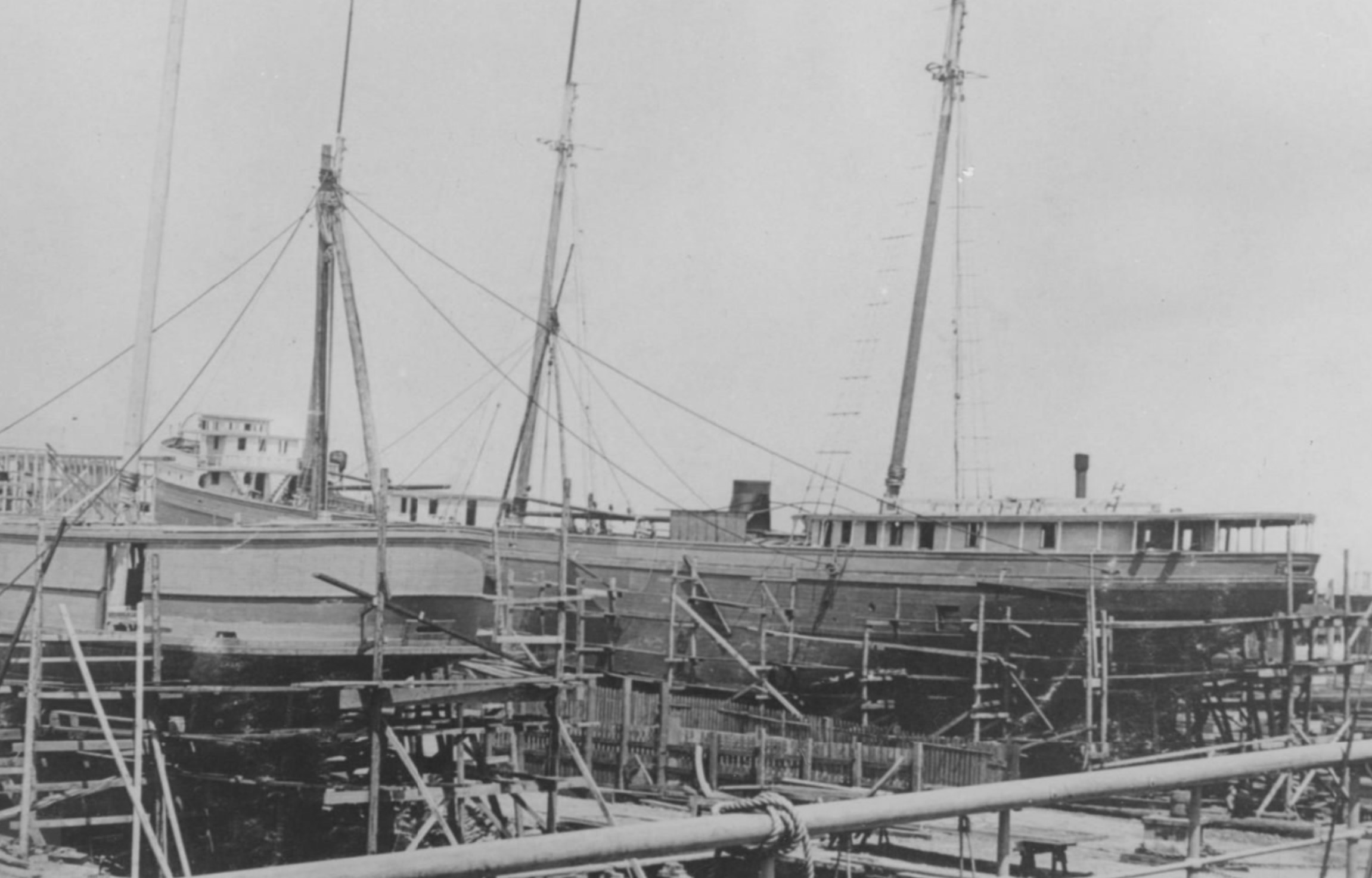
Ira H. Owen under construction

Ira H. Owen (US official number 100410) was built in 1887 in Cleveland, Ohio, by the Globe Iron Works Company. She was one of the first steel lake freighters built on the Great Lakes, as well as the fourth steel ship built by the Globe Iron Works Company.

Ira H. Owen's hull had an overall length 278.3 feet (84.8 m) and a length between perpendiculars of 262 feet (79.9 m). Her beam was 39 feet (11.9 m) wide, while her hull was 19 feet (5.8 m) deep. Ira H. Owen had a gross tonnage of 1,753.22 (one source states just 1,753 tons), and a net tonnage of 1,497.77 (one source states 1,498) tons.

She was powered by a single double-cylinder 750 hp (560 kW) 85 rpm fore and aft compound steam engine; the cylinders of the engine were 25 inches (63.5 cm) and 50 inches (127.0 cm), and had a stroke of 42 inches (110 cm). Steam for the engine was provided by two 9 feet (2.7 m) by 14 feet (4.3 m) 112 pounds per square inch (770 kPa) Scotch marine boilers. Ira H. Owen's engine and boilers were both built by the Globe Iron Works Company. She was propelled by a single fixed-pitch propeller.

Originally, Ira H. Owen had three masts. She also had two decks, two funnels and a cargo capacity of 2,854 long tons (3,196 short tons; 2,900 t).

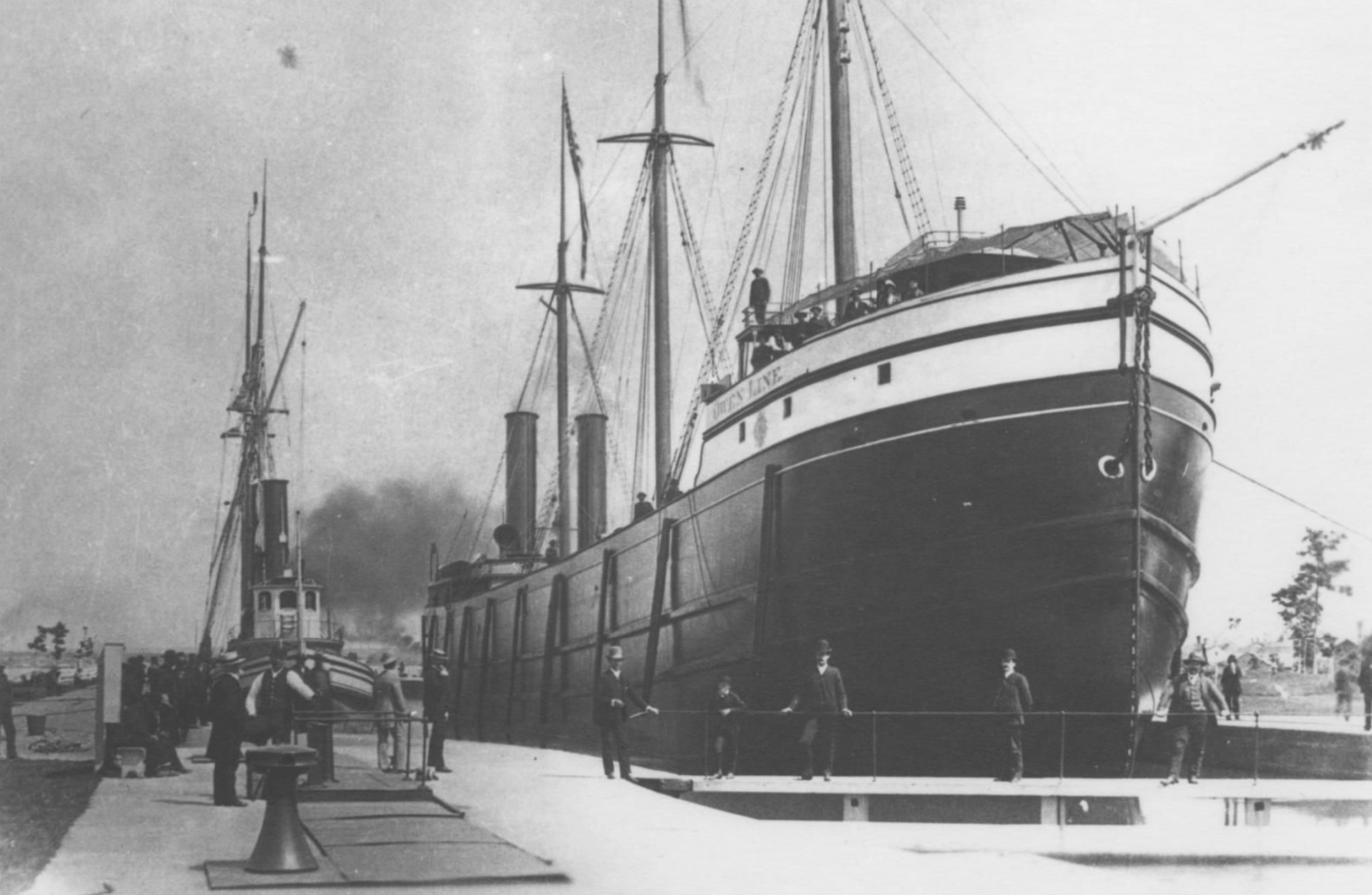
Ira H. Owen in her original configuration

=== Service history ===
Launched on July 7, 1887, Ira H. Owen was yard number 14; she was enrolled in Cleveland on July 28, and received her permanent enrollment in Chicago, Illinois, on August 7. She was built for the Owen Line of Chicago, which was also her home port; she entered service in 1887. Early in her career, Ira H. Owen carried iron ore from Escanaba, Michigan. Throughout her career, Ira H. Owen was involved in multiple accidents and incidents.

The first accident Ira H. Owen was involved in occurred in April 1889, when she ran aground in the St. Clair River. On November 27 or 29, 1891, Ira H. Owen ran aground close to the Soo Locks. While bound for Chicago on June 16, 1892, Ira H. Owen collided with the two-masted schooner Belle Brown, about 16 miles (25.7 km) off Ludington, Michigan. Ira H. Owen's cabin was badly damaged, while Belle Brown lost her bowsprit, jibboom and various other gear. After towing Belle Brown to Ludington, Ira H. Owen headed for Chicago.

On the night of July 2, 1893, while heavily laden with iron ore, Ira H. Owen struck a rock off Cedar Point, near Sault Ste. Marie, Michigan. The rock punched a hole in her hull, after which she was beached to prevent her from sinking.

Early in the morning of July 20, 1897, while travelling on Lake Huron, Ira H. Owen collided with the package freighter Susquehanna in thick fog off Presque Isle, Michigan. Both vessels were severely damaged; Ira H. Owen headed for Alpena, Michigan, for repairs, while Susquehanna proceeded to Middle Island, and eventually sailed to Chicago. Ira H. Owen sustained $10,000 (equivalent to $323,402 in 2024) worth of damage, while Susquehanna sustained $9,000 (equivalent to $291,062 in 2024). Initially, Ira H. Owen's first mate Sidney O. Neff was blamed for the collision and had his licence suspended for 90 days. It was eventually proven that the collision was due to a "misjudgement as to the relative position of the two steamers", and not due to negligence on the part of Neff.

In April 1898, Ira H. Owen was chartered to the Baltimore & Ohio Railroad. On December 30, 1899, Ira H. Owen was sold to the National Steamship Company of Chicago, and had one of her masts removed. While owned by the National Steamship Company, Ira H. Owen frequently carried coal and grain.

After leaving Manitowoc, Wisconsin, on December 5, 1903, with a cargo of grain bound for Buffalo, New York, a fire broke out in Ira H. Owen's boiler room. After trying and failing to extinguish the fire, her crew decided to beach her. However, this also failed. The crew initially decided to leave Ira H. Owen. As they were getting into the lifeboats, the car ferry Ann Arbor No.1 appeared at the scene, after hearing Ira H. Owen's distress calls. Ann Arbor No.1's crew decided to tow Ira H. Owen to Sturgeon Bay, Wisconsin. The two vessels were tied together, and the fire was fought while heading for the Sturgeon Bay Ship Canal. The two vessels were joined by the steamer George Burnham and the lighthouse tender Hyacinth. Overnight, the fire on board Ira H. Owen was extinguished. The fire burned a hole into her side, causing her to sink into 20 feet (6.1 m) of water. The aft cabins of Ira H. Owen were destroyed; the loss of Ira H. Owen and her cargo amounted to about $100,000. She was repaired, and was put back into service.

On October 13, 1904, while upbound with a cargo of coal, Ira H. Owen collided with the, downbound, ore-laden freighter Henry W. Oliver in the St. Marys River, off DeTour Village, Michigan, due to a confusion of the passing signals. The damage sustained by Ira H. Owen was so severe that she had to be beached, in order to prevent her from sinking in deep water. The captain of Ira H. Owen, George C. Graham had his licence revoked for four months, due to negligence on his part.

=== Final voyage ===
On the morning of November 28, 1905, Ira H. Owen left Duluth, Minnesota, with a "light load" of 116,000 bushels of barley bound for Buffalo. She was under command of Captain Thomas Honner. Previously a first mate, he had been made captain of Ira H. Owen prior to her final trip, as her previous captain, Joseph Hulligan (who was still on board), had taken ill. While the weather conditions began to deteriorate as she passed the Apostle Islands, her captain opted not to seek shelter. As Ira H. Owen was passing Outer Island, she was struck by the full force by the 80–90 miles per hour (128.7–144.8 km/h) winds of what would become the Mataafa Storm. She was spotted by Captain Alva Keller of the freighter Harold B. Nye 40 miles (64.4 km) off Outer Island, and appeared to be in trouble, continually blowing distress signals. Harold B. Nye, however, was unable to assist Ira H. Owen. The snow eventually blocked Ira H. Owen from Captain Keller's view. After two hours, the storm had passed; Captain Keller looked for Ira H. Owen with his binoculars, but was unable to locate her.

On December 1, at 10:00 a.m., the captain of the freighter Sir William Siemens, M.K. Chamberlain reported locating wreckage from Ira H. Owen, consisting of chairs, the top of a cabin, stairs, stanchions and multiple life jackets with S.S. Ira H. Owen stenciled on them, 12 miles (19.3 km) east of Michigan Island. None of Ira H. Owen's 19 crewmen survived, making her the only victim of the Mataafa Storm to be lost with all hands; none of their bodies were recovered. Ira H. Owen and her cargo were insured for $100,000 (equivalent to $3.23 million in 2024).

Although her wreck has not been located, according to the Wisconsin Historical Society the wreck of Ira H. Owen most likely lies in deep water off Outer Island in the Apostles.

== Sources ==
- Alpena County George N. Fletcher Public Library (2020). "Owen, Ira H. (1887, Bulk Freighter)". Alpena, Michigan: Alpena County George N. Fletcher Public Library.
- Berry, Sterling (2020). "Owen, Ira H." Detroit, Michigan: Great Lakes Vessel History.
- Bowling Green State University (2021). "Owen, Ira H." Bowling Green, Ohio: Bowling Green State University.
- Bowlus, W. Bruce (2010). Iron Ore Transport on the Great Lakes: The Development of a Delivery System to Feed American Industry. Jefferson, North Carolina: McFarland & Company, Inc. ISBN 9780786486557.
- Brown, Curt (2011). So Terrible a Storm: A Tale of Fury on Lake Superior. Minneapolis, Minnesota: Voyageur Press. ISBN 978-0-760340-12-7.
- Bugbee, Gordon P. (February 1962a). "Iron Merchant Ships: An Upper Lakes Centennial – Part One" (PDF). Detroit, Michigan: Great Lakes Maritime Institute.
- Bugbee, Gordon P. (March 1962b). "Iron Merchant Ships: An Upper Lakes Centennial – Part Two" (PDF). Detroit, Michigan: Great Lakes Maritime Institute.
- Colton, Tim (2021). "Globe Iron Works, Cleveland OH". Shipbuilding History.
- Keller, Keller M. (2014). The "Unholy" Apostles: Shipwreck Tales of the Apostle Islands. Waterville, Minnesota: Apostle Islands Press. ISBN 978-0-692237-65-6.
- LeMay, Konnie (2005). "The Mataafa Blow: The Stormy Horror of 1905". Duluth, Minnesota: Lake Superior Magazine.
- Maritime History of the Great Lakes (1891). "Ira H. Owen (Propeller), U100410, aground, 26 Nov 1891". Ontario, Canada: Maritime History of the Great Lakes.
- Maritime History of the Great Lakes (1892). "Ira H. Owen (Propeller), U100410, collision, 16 Jun 1892". Ontario, Canada: Maritime History of the Great Lakes.
- Maritime History of the Great Lakes (1897). "Ira H. Owen (Propeller), U100410, collision, 20 Jul 1897". Ontario, Canada: Maritime History of the Great Lakes.
- Maritime History of the Great Lakes (1903). "Ira H. Owen (Propeller), U100410, fire, 4 Dec 1903". Ontario, Canada: Maritime History of the Great Lakes.
- Maritime History of the Great Lakes (1904). "Ira H. Owen (Propeller), U100410, collision, 13 Oct 1904". Ontario, Canada: Maritime History of the Great Lakes.
- Maritime History of the Great Lakes (1905). "Ira H. Owen (Propeller), U100410, sunk, 28 Nov 1905". Ontario, Canada: Maritime History of the Great Lakes.
- Marsh Collection Society (1893). "Marine News of 1893" (PDF). Amherstburg, Ontario: Amherstburg Echo.
- Meverden, Keith N.; Thomsen, Tamara L. (2008). "Wisconsin's Historic Shipwrecks –An Overview and Analysis of Locations for a State/Federal Partnership With The National Marine Sanctuary Program" (PDF). Madison, Wisconsin: Wisconsin Historical Society.
- Minnesota Historical Society (2008). "George spencer –Description of the Wreck Event". Saint Paul, Minnesota: Minnesota Historical Society.
- Stonehouse, Frederick (1984). Went Missing, II. Au Train, Michigan: Avery Color Studios. ISBN 978-0-932212-37-5.
- Swayze, David (2001). "Great Lakes Shipwrecks –O". Port Huron, Michigan: Boatnerd.
- Thompson, Mark L. (1994). Queen of the Lakes. Detroit, Michigan: Wayne State University Press. ISBN 0-8143-2393-6.
- University of California (1898). "Annual report of the Supervising Inspector General, 1897–1898". Oakland, California: University of California.
- Wisconsin Shipwrecks (2021). "Ira H. Owen (1887)". Madison, Wisconsin: Wisconsin Historical Society.
