= Northeastern Minnesota Book Awards =

The Northeastern Minnesota Book Awards, or the NEMBA Awards, are awards presented annually for books that "substantially represent northeastern Minnesota in the areas of history, culture, heritage, or lifestyle."

The awards, originally established in 1988, are organized by the University of Minnesota, Duluth Library, with assistance from the Friends of the Duluth Public Library and Lake Superior Writers. To be eligible for an award, books must be about the region (defined as a nine-county area) but need not be written by local authors. Prizes are currently awarded in six categories: General Nonfiction, Fiction, Art & Photography, Children's Literature, Poetry, and Memoir and Creative Nonfiction.

== Winners ==
=== 1980s ===
- 1988 – Quiet Magic by Sam Cook
- 1989 – The Winter Room by Gary Paulsen

=== 1990s ===
- 1990 – Gunflint: Reflections on the Trail by Justine Kerfoot
- 1991 – North Writers: A Strong Woods Collection edited by John Henricksson
- 1992 – The Grand Portage Story by Carolyn Gilman
- 1993 – Walking the Rez Road by Jim Northrup
- 1994 – The Illustrated Voyageur by Howard Sivertson
- 1995 – The Duluth Portfolio by Craig and Nadine Blacklock
- 1996 – Silent Words by Joan M. Drury
- 1997 – Just Above Water by Louis Jenkins
- 1998 – Cold Comfort by Barton Sutter
- 1999 – 50 Circuit Hikes by Howard Fenton

=== 2000s ===
- 2000 – John Blair and the Great Hinckley Fire by Josephine Nobisso
- 2001 – Schooners, Skiffs & Steamships: Stories along Lake Superior Water Trails by Howard Sivertson
- 2002
  - Fiction, Poetry, Drama: Borealis by Jeff Humphries with woodcut prints by Betsy Bowen
  - Nonfiction, Art, Scholarship: The Art of the Canoe with Joe Seliga by Jerry Stelmok with photography by Deborah Sussex
- 2003
  - Fiction, Poetry, Drama: Uncommon Light: A Collection of Poems by Jeanine Lamoureux Emmons, Gladys Koski Holmes, Kathleen McQuillan, Stephanie Stevens, and Sheila Packa
  - Nonfiction, Art, Scholarship: V Is for Viking: A Minnesota Alphabet by Kathy-jo Wargin, illustrated by Karen Latham and Rebecca Latham
- 2004
  - Fiction, Poetry, Drama: Ojibwe Tales: Stories of the Ojibwe People by Art Przybilla with the aid of the late Randy Councillor
  - Nonfiction, Art, Scholarship: Minnesota's Iron Country: Rich Ore, Rich Lives by Marvin Lamppa
- 2005
  - Fiction, Poetry, Drama: Zoe's Good-bye written and illustrated by Mary Schlangen
  - Nonfiction, Art, Scholarship: Salmela: Architect by Thomas Fisher, with photographs by Peter Bastianelli-Kerze
- 2006
  - Fiction, Poetry, Drama: The North Shore written by Gunnard Landers
  - Nonfiction, Memoir: Waking: A Memoir of Trauma and Transcendence written by Matthew Sanford
  - Children's Literature: Fearless John: The Legend of John Beargrease written by Kelly Emerling Rauzi and illustrated by Mila Horak
- 2007
  - Fiction, Poetry, Drama: Thunder Bay: A Cork O'Connor Mystery written by William Kent Krueger
  - Nonfiction, Memoir: Morgan Park: Duluth, U.S. Steel, and the Forging of a Company Town written by Arnold R. Alanen
  - Children's Literature: Agate: What Good is a Moose? written by Joy Morgan Dey and illustrated by Nikki Johnson
  - Art, Photography : Celebrating Birch: The Lore, Art, and Craft of an Ancient Tree written by North House Folk School
- 2008
  - Fiction: A Finntown of the Soul written by Patricia Eilola
  - Poetry: Trail Guide to the Northland Experience in Prints and Poetry by Northern Printmakers Alliance and Lake Superior Writers
  - General Nonfiction: Hard Work and a Good Deal: The Civilian Conservation Corps in Minnesota written by Barbara W. Sommer
  - Children's Literature: Someone Walks By: The Wonders of Winter Wildlife written by Polly Carlson-Voiles
  - Art, Photography: Driftwood: Stories Picked Up along the Shore written by Howard Sivertson
  - Memoir and Creative Nonfiction: Overburden: Modern Life on the Iron Range written by Aaron Brown
- 2009
  - Fiction: Minnesota Coldwritten by Cynthia Kraack
  - Poetry: The Dark Honey: New & Used Poems by Ellie Schoenfeld
  - General Nonfiction: Minong – The Good Place: Ojibwe and Isle Royale written by Timothy Cochrane
  - Children's Literature: Wintering written by William Durbin
  - Memoir and Creative Nonfiction: Knife Island written by Stephen Dahl

=== 2010s ===
- 2010
  - Fiction: Safe from the Sea written by Peter Geye
  - Poetry: On Speaking Terms by Connie Wanek
  - General Nonfiction: Paddle North: Canoeing the Boundary Waters–Quetico Wilderness written by Greg Breining, photography by Layne Kennedy
  - Children's Literature: Minnesota's Hidden Alphabet written by David LaRochelle, photography by Joe Rossi
  - Memoir and Creative Nonfiction: Brown Sugar Syrup and Jack Pine Sand written by Dennis Herschbach
- 2011
  - Fiction: Dead Ahead: A Jo Spence Mystery written by Jen Wright
  - Poetry: Tumbled Dry by Charmaine Donovan
  - General Nonfiction: Ancient Earth and the First Ancestors: A Cultural and Geological Journey written by Ron Morton and Carl Gawboy, illustrated by Carl Gawboy
  - Children's Literature: Unforgettable written by Loretta Ellsworth
  - Art, Photography: Voyageur Skies: Weather and the Wilderness in Minnesota's National Park, photography by Don Breneman, weather commentary by Mark Seeley
  - Memoir and Creative Nonfiction: Shelter written by Sarah Stonich
- 2012
  - Fiction: The Lighthouse Road written by Peter Geye
  - Poetry: The First Day of Spring in Northern Minnesota by Jim Johnson
  - General Nonfiction: Hawk Ridge: Minnesota's Birds of Prey written by Laura Erickson, illustrated by Betsy Bowen
  - Children's Literature: Summer of the Wolves written by Polly Carlson-Voiles
  - Art, Photography: Another Year on the Gunflint Trail by Nace Hagemann
  - Memoir and Creative Nonfiction: My Mother Is Now Earth written by Mark Anthony Rolo
- 2013
  - Fiction: Tamarack County written by William Kent Krueger
  - Poetry: Bound Together: Like the Grasses by Deborah Cooper, Candace Ginsberg, Ann Floreen Niedringhaus, Ellie Schoenfeld, Anne Simpson
  - General Nonfiction: The Pie Place Cafe Cookbook: Food & Stories Seasoned by the North Shore written by Kathy Rice
  - Children's Literature: The Best Part of a Sauna written by Sheryl Peterson, illustrated by Kelly Dupre
  - Memoir and Creative Nonfiction: Threads of Hope: Caring for Babies Across Three Continents written by Martha Aas, M.D.
- 2014
  - Fiction: Sins of Our Fathers, written by Shawn Lawrence Otto
  - Poetry: Approaching the Gate, by Lynette Reini-Grandell
  - General Nonfiction: Twin Ports by Trolley: The Streetcar Era in Duluth-Superior, written by Aaron Isaacs
  - Children's Literature: Rhoda's Rock Hunt, written by Molly Beth Griffin, illustrated by Jennifer A. Bell
  - Memoir and Creative Nonfiction: Rooted in Iron and Ice: Innocent Years on the Mesabi, written by Gary W. Barfknecht
  - Art, Photography: Saved by Beauty: Sister Mary Charles McGough, OSB, written by John Schifsky, Sister Lois Eckes, Peter Spooner, Dustin Lyon and Meridith Schifsky
- 2015
  - Fiction: Once Were Mountains written by Victoria Richards
  - Poetry: Yoik by Jim Johnson
  - Nonfiction: Taconite Dreams: The Struggle to Sustain Mining on Minnesota's Iron Range, 1915–2000 written by Jeffrey T. Manuel
  - Children's Literature: Wilder's Ghost written by Diane Bradley
  - Memoir: Hillsider: Snapshots of a Curious Political Journey written by Don Ness
  - Art, Photography: The Way of Cheng-Khee Chee: Paintings 1974–2014 curated by Peter Spooner, The Tweed Museum of Art
- 2016
  - Fiction: Wintering written by Peter Geye
  - Poetry: The Sky Watched: Poems of Ojibwe Lives by Linda LeGarde Grover
  - Nonfiction: What Should A Clever Moose Eat? Natural History, Ecology, and the North Woods written by John Pastor
  - Children's Literature: One North Star: A Counting Book written by Phyllis Root, illustrated by Betsy Bowen and Beckie Prange
  - Memoir: Homemade: Finnish Rye, Feed Sack Fashion, and Other Simple Ingredients from My Life in Food written by Beatrice Ojakangas
  - Art, Photography: Glensheen: The Official Guide to Duluth's Historic Congdon Estate by Tony Dierckins, photography by Dennis O'Hara

== Other Minnesota literary awards ==
Since 1988, the Minnesota Fantasy Award has been presented annually to a person or persons with ties to Minnesota in recognition of their contributions to the fields of fantasy, science fiction and horror.

Also, since 1988, the Minnesota Book Awards are presented annually for books created by writers, illustrators or book artists who are Minnesotans.
