= William Kent Krueger =

American novelist

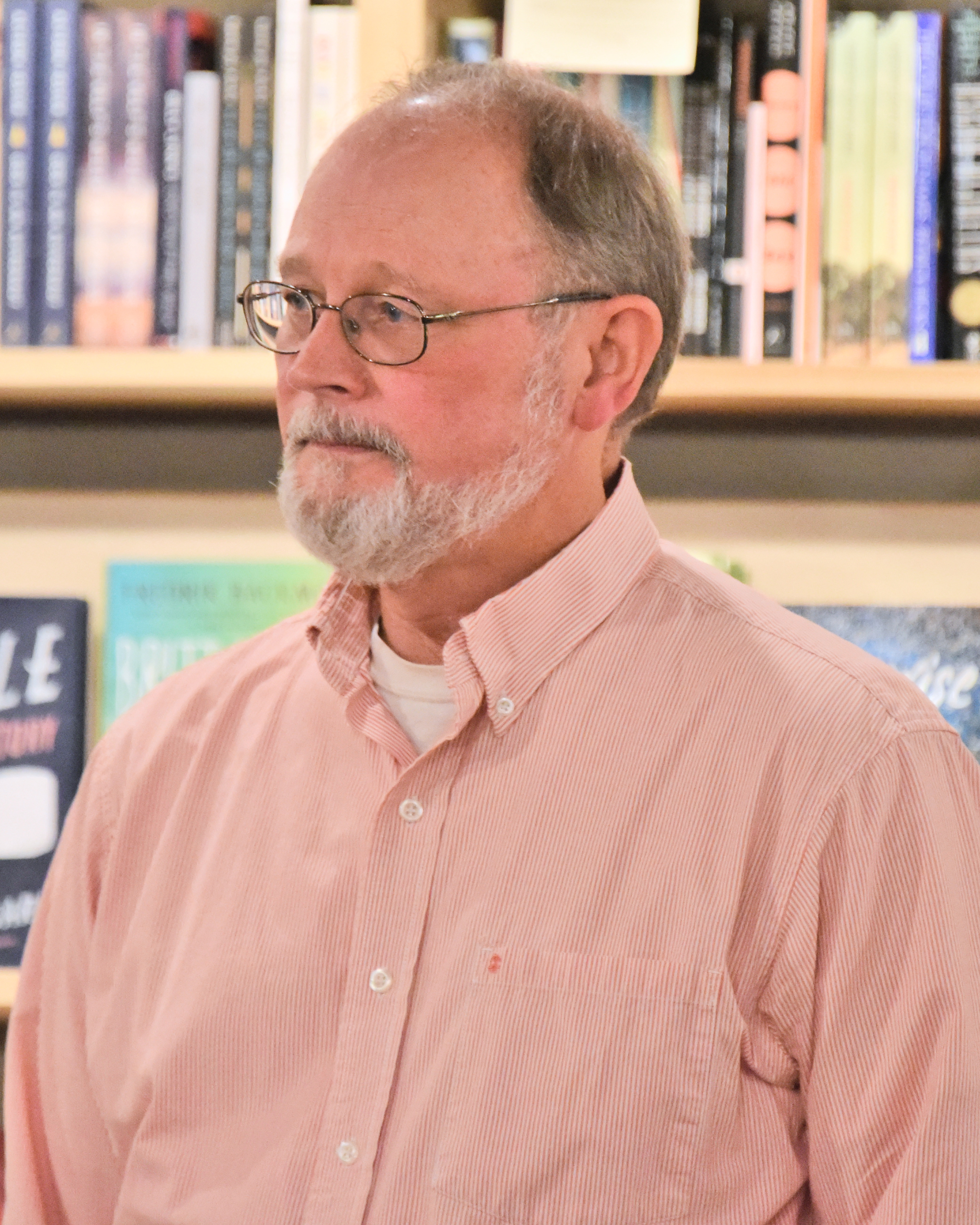
- Krueger at a book signing in Saint Paul, Minnesota
- Born: November 16, 1950 (age 75); Torrington, Wyoming, U.S.
- Occupation: Novelist
- Writing career
- Period: 1998–present
- Genres: Mystery, crime fiction
- Subjects: Minnesota, Native American Indian Tribes, Anishinaabe (Ojibwe)
- Notable works: Iron Lake, Cork O'Connor Series
- Notable awards: Bush Artist Fellowship; 1988 Loft-McKnight Fiction Award; 1998 Iron Lake; Anthony Award for Best First Novel; 1999 Iron Lake; Barry Award for Best First Novel; 1999 Iron Lake; Anthony Award for Best Novel; 2005 Blood Hollow; Anthony Award for Best Novel; 2006 Mercy Falls Edgar Award for Best Novel; 2013 Ordinary Grace
- Website: www.williamkentkrueger.com

William Kent Krueger (born November 16, 1950) is an American novelist and crime writer, best known for his series of novels featuring Cork O'Connor, which are set mainly in Minnesota. In 2005 and 2006, he won back-to-back Anthony Awards for best novel. In 2014, his stand-alone book Ordinary Grace won the Edgar Award for Best Novel of 2013. In 2019, This Tender Land was on the New York Times bestseller list for nearly six months.

== Biographical details ==
Krueger has said he wanted to be a writer since the third grade, when his story "The Walking Dictionary" was praised by his teacher and parents.

He attended Stanford University, but his academic path was cut short when he came into conflict with the university's administration during student protests in 1970. Throughout his early life, he supported himself by logging timber, digging ditches, working in construction, and publishing as a freelance journalist; he never stopped writing.

He wrote short stories and sketches for many years but did not finish the manuscript of his first novel, Iron Lake, until he was 40. It won the Anthony Award for Best First Novel, the Barry Award for Best First Novel, the Minnesota Book Award, and the Loft-McKnight Fiction Award.

Krueger is married and has two children. He lives in Saint Paul, Minnesota.

== Writing influences ==
Krueger has said his favorite book is To Kill a Mockingbird. He grew up reading Ernest Hemingway, John Steinbeck, F. Scott Fitzgerald, and James T. Farrell. Most influential among these was Hemingway. In an interview for Shots magazine, Krueger described his admiration for Hemingway's prose:

His prose is clean, his word choice perfect, his cadence precise and powerful. He wastes nothing. In Hemingway, what's not said is often the whole point of a story. I like that idea, leaving the heart off the page so that the words, the prose itself, is the first thing to pierce you. Then the meaning comes.

As a mystery genre writer, Krueger credits Tony Hillerman and James Lee Burke as his strongest influences.

== Writing process ==
Krueger prefers to write early in the morning. He began writing in his 30s and had to make time for writing early in the morning before going to work at the University of Minnesota. Rising at 5:30 am, he would go to the nearby St. Clair Broiler, where he drank coffee and wrote longhand in wire-bound notebooks. In return for his loyalty, the restaurant hosted book launches for him. At one of them, the staff wore T-shirts emblazoned with "A nice place to visit. A great place to die." The St. Clair Broiler closed in 2017.

== Setting for the Cork O'Connor series ==
When Krueger decided to set the series in northern Minnesota, he realized that a large percentage of the population was of mixed ancestry. In college, he had wanted to become a cultural anthropologist; he became intrigued by researching the Ojibwe culture and weaving the information into his books. His books are set in and around Native American reservations. The main character, Cork O'Connor, is part Ojibwe and part Irish.

History was a study in futility. Because people never learned. Century after century, they committed the same atrocities against one another or against the earth, and the only thing that changed was the magnitude of the slaughter... Conscience was a devil that plagued the individual. Collectively, a people squashed it as easily as stepping on a daisy.

— William Kent Krueger, Purgatory Ridge

Krueger has read the first Ojibwe historian, William Whipple Warren, as well as Gerald Vizenor and Basil Johnston. He has also read novels by Louise Erdrich and Jim Northrup. Krueger began to meet Ojibwe people because of his interest in their culture.

Krueger believes that the sense of place is made resonant by the actions and emotions of the characters within it. He calls it "a dynamic bond that has the potential to heighten the drama of every scene."

== Bibliography ==
=== Cork O'Connor ===
1. Iron Lake
  - Pocket Books, Simon & Schuster, hardcover (1998), ISBN 0-671-01696-2
  - Pocket Books, Simon & Schuster, paperback (1999), ISBN 0-671-01697-0
  - Recorded Books (2010), ISBN 1-4407-5520-5, ISBN 978-1-4407-5520-0
2. Boundary Waters
  - Pocket Books, Simon & Schuster, hardcover (1999), ISBN 0-671-01698-9
  - Recorded Books (2010), ISBN 1-4407-5524-8, ISBN 978-1-4407-5524-8
3. Purgatory Ridge
  - Pocket Books, Simon & Schuster, hardcover (2001), ISBN 0-671-04753-1
  - Pocket Books, Simon & Schuster, paperback (20028, ISBN 0-671-04754-X
  - Recorded Books (2010), ISBN 1-4407-5528-0, ISBN 978-1-4407-5528-6
4. Blood Hollow
  - Atria, Simon & Schuster, hardcover (2004), ISBN 0-7434-4586-4
  - Pocket Books, Simon & Schuster, paperback (2005), ISBN 0-7434-4587-2
5. Mercy Falls
  - Atria, Simon & Schuster, hardcover (2005), ISBN 0-7434-4588-0
  - Pocket Books, Simon & Schuster, paperback (2006), ISBN 0-7434-4589-9
6. Copper River
  - Atria, Simon & Schuster, hardcover (2006), ISBN 0-7432-7840-2
  - Pocket Books, Simon & Schuster, paperback (2007), ISBN 1-4165-1446-5
7. Thunder Bay
  - Atria, Simon & Schuster, hardcover (2007), ISBN 0-7432-7841-0
  - Atria Books, trade paperback (2009), ISBN 978-1-4391-5782-4
8. Red Knife
  - Atria Books, hardcover (2008), ISBN 978-1-4165-5674-9
  - Atria Books, trade paperback (2009), ISBN 978-1-4165-5675-6
9. Heaven's Keep
  - Atria Books, hardcover (2009), ISBN 978-1-4165-5676-3
  - Atria Books, trade paperback (2010), ISBN 978-1416556770
10. Vermilion Drift
  - Atria Books, hardcover (2010), ISBN 978-1439153840
  - Atria Books, trade paperback (2011), ISBN 978-1439153871
11. Northwest Angle
  - Atria Books, hardcover (2011), ISBN 978-1439153956
  - Atria Books, trade paperback (2012), ISBN 978-1439153963
12. Trickster's Point
  - Atria Books, hardcover (2012), ISBN 978-1451645675
  - Atria Books, trade paperback (2013), ISBN 978-1451645712
13. Tamarack County
  - Atria Books, hardcover (2013), ISBN 978-1451645750
  - Atria Books, trade paperback (2014), ISBN 978-1451645774
14. Windigo Island
  - Atria Books, hardcover (2014), ISBN 978-1476749235
  - Atria Books, trade paperback (2015), ISBN 978-1476749242
15. Manitou Canyon
  - Atria Books, hardcover (2016), ISBN 978-1476749266
  - Atria Books, trade paperback (2017), ISBN 978-1476749273
16. Sulfur Springs
  - Atria Books, Simon & Schuster, Hardcover (2017), ISBN 978-1501147340
  - Atria Books, Simon & Schuster, Trade Paperback (2018), ISBN 978-1501147432
17. Desolation Mountain
  - Atria Books (2018), ISBN 978-1501147463
18. Lightning Strike
  - Atria Books (2021), ISBN 978-1982128685
19. Fox Creek
  - Atria Books (2022), ISBN 978-1982128715
20. Spirit Crossing
  - Atria Books (2024), ISBN 978-1982179243
21. Apostle's Cove
  - Atria Books (2025), ISBN 978-1982179304
22. God's Country
  - Atria Books (2026), ISBN 978-1668231869

=== Stand-alone novels ===
- The Devil's Bed
  - Atria Books, Simon & Schuster, hardcover (2003), ISBN 0-7434-6636-5
  - Pocket Star paperback (2003)
- Ordinary Grace
  - Atria Books, Simon & Schuster, hardcover (2013), ISBN 978-1451645828
  - Atria Books, Simon & Schuster, trade paperback (2014), ISBN 978-1451645859
- This Tender Land
  - Atria Books, Simon & Schuster, hardcover (2019), ISBN 978-1476749297
- The River We Remember
  - Atria Books, Simon & Schuster, hardcover (2023), ISBN 978-1-9821-7921-2

=== Anthologies ===
- "Before Swine" in The Silence of the Loons, Nodin Press (soft cover, 2005)
- "Hixton" in Crimes By Moonlight, Berkley Publishing (ebook, 2010)
- "Bums" in USA Noir, Akashic Books (soft cover, 2013)

== Awards ==
- Bush Artist Fellowship, 1988
- Loft-McKnight Fiction Award, 1998 (forIron Lake)
- Minnesota Book Award, 1999 (for Iron Lake)
- Anthony Award for Best First Novel, 1999 (for Iron Lake)
- Barry Award for Best First Novel, 1999 (for Iron Lake)
- Friends of American Writers Prize, 1999
- Minnesota Book Award, 2002 (for Purgatory Ridge)
- Readers Choice Award, 2003
- Anthony Award for Best Novel, 2005 (for Blood Hollow)
- Anthony Award for Best Novel, 2006 (for Mercy Falls)
- Minnesota Book Award, 2007 (for Copper River)
- Northeastern Minnesota Book Award, 2007 (for Thunder Bay)
- Dilys Award, 2008 (for Thunder Bay)
- Minnesota Book Award, 2008 (for Thunder Bay)
- Midwest Booksellers Choice Award, 2013 (for Ordinary Grace)
- Edgar Award, 2013 (for Ordinary Grace)
