= Gitchi-Gami State Trail =

Coordinates: 47.196825°N 91.384912°W

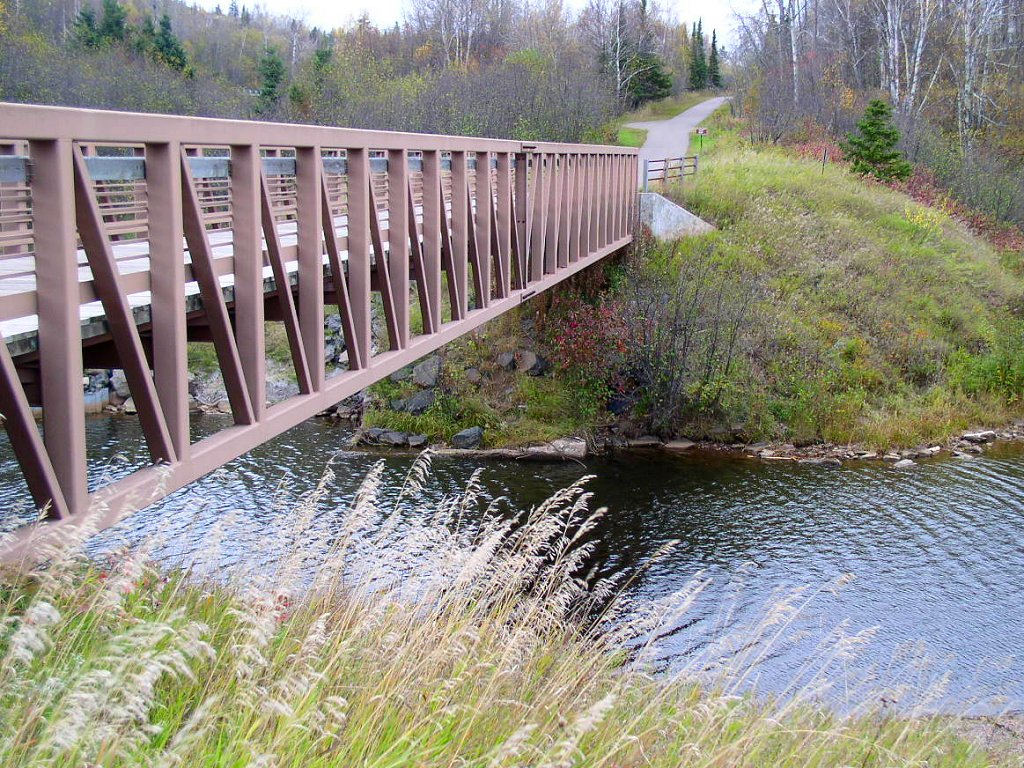
- The Gitchi-Gami State Trail crossing the Split Rock River
- Length: 33 mi (53 km)
- Location: North Shore, Minnesota, USA
- Designation: Minnesota state trail
- Trailheads: Gooseberry Falls State Park; Beaver Bay; Schroeder; Tofte; Grand Marais
- Use: Biking, hiking, in-line skating
- Sights: Lake Superior, Split Rock Lighthouse, North Shore state parks and state natural areas
- Surface: Asphalt
- Website: Gitchi-Gami State Trail

The Gitchi-Gami State Trail is a multi-use recreational trail in development along the North Shore of Lake Superior in Minnesota, USA. Planned to extend 88 miles (142 km) from Two Harbors to Grand Marais, the trail currently comprises five unconnected segments. The route will be situated primarily along state-owned right-of-way for Minnesota State Highway 61, with deviations for greater scenic diversity. "Gitchi-Gami" is an anglicization of the name for Lake Superior in the Ojibwe language.

== Description ==
The longest completed section runs 17.6 miles (28.3 km) from Gooseberry Falls State Park to the town of Beaver Bay, passing through Split Rock Lighthouse State Park on the way. Another 3-mile (4.8 km) segment runs from Schroeder to Tofte through Temperance River State Park. The trail resumes at the other side of Tofte for a 7.3-mile (11.7 km) segment that goes to Lutsen. Lastly there is a 1-mile (1.6 km) completed segment outside Two Harbors and a 1.5-mile (2.4 km) section leading into Grand Marais. New sections are under construction during the summer of 2011, with others in planning stages.
