= Cold Comfort =

Cold Comfort may refer to:

== Film and television ==
- Cold Comfort, 1957 short film co-written by and starring Peter Sellers
- Cold Comfort (film), 1989 film directed by Vic Sarin
- "Cold Comfort" (Are You Being Served?), a 1974 episode of Are You Being Served?
- "Cold Comfort" (X-Men), a 1995 episode of X-Men
- "Cold Comfort" (The New Batman Adventures), a 1997 episode of The New Batman Adventures
- "Cold Comfort" (Dark Angel), a 2000 episode of Dark Angel
- "Cold Comfort" (Law & Order: Criminal Intent), a 2003 episode of Criminal Intent
- "Cold Comfort" (Inside No. 9), a 2015 episode of Inside No. 9

== Other ==
- Operation Cold Comfort, a failed raid during World War II
- Cold Comfort (album), a 2011 album by Autumn
- Cold Comfort, a 1998 book by Barton Sutter

== See also ==
- Cold Comfort Farm, a 1932 comic novel by Stella Gibbons
