= Linda LeGarde Grover =

- Born: 1950; Duluth
- Writing career
- Language: English, Ojibwemowin
- Genres: Fiction, Poetry, Essays
- Notable works: Onigamiising: Seasons of an Ojibwe Year, The Sky Watched: Poems of Ojibwe Lives, The Road Back to Sweetgrass, The Dance Boots, In the Night of Memory, Gichigami Hearts: Stories & Histories From Misaabekong

Linda LeGarde Grover is an Anishinaabe novelist and short story writer. An enrolled member of the Bois Forte Band of the Minnesota Chippewa Tribe, she is a professor emeritus of American Indian Studies at the University of Minnesota Duluth, as well as a columnist for the Duluth News Tribune.

== Biography ==
Born in 1950, Grover is Ojibwe from Minnesota.

== Career ==
Grover's debut collection of short stories, The Dance Boots, won the Flannery O'Connor Award and the 2011 Janet Heidinger Kafka Prize, her poetry collection The Sky Watched: Poems of Ojibwe Lives the Red Mountain Press Editor's Award and the 2017 Northeastern Minnesota Book Award for Poetry. Her first novel, The Road Back to Sweetgrass received the Wordcraft Circle of Native Writers and Storytellers 2015 Fiction Award, the earlier unpublished manuscript the Native Writers' Circle of the Americas First Book Award 2008. Indian Country Media Network described the novel as being "most notable for [...] its closely-observed and beautifully expressed perspective on contemporary American Indian life". Critic Martha Viehmann places the novel in an Anishinaabe cultural context, writing in the academic journal Transmotion that "The setting on an imaginary Ojibwe reservation with ties to an urban area is like Erdrichs's novels. An English language novel sprinkled with Ojibwe words, many but not all translated, reminds me of Treuer's use of names in The Translation of Dr. Apelles. Satirical descriptions of a white professor who claims to be an expert on Indians and of the bumbling behavior of an outsider remind me of Vizenor's biting humor. The emphasis on the seasonal activities that mark the Ojibwe year echo Jim Northrup's stories. Yet Grover's voice is hers alone, one that clearly has a place in this growing body of contemporary Ojibwe literature."

Grover's essay collection Onigamiising: Seasons of an Ojibwe Year received the 2018 Minnesota Book Award for Memoir and Creative Nonfiction.
