= This Tender Land =

2019 novel written by William Kent Krueger

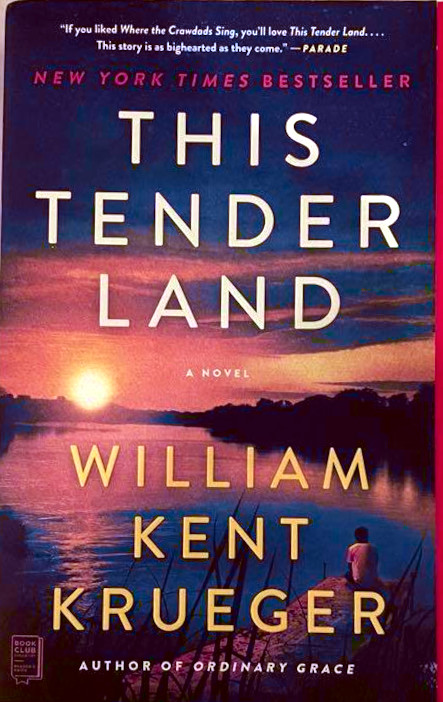
- First edition
- Author: William Kent Krueger
- Genre: Historical fiction, Coming-of-age story
- Published: 2019
- Publisher: Atria Books
- Pages: 464
- ISBN: 1476749299
- Website: This Tender Land

This Tender Land is a book written by William Kent Krueger and published by Atria Books (now owned by Simon & Schuster) in September 2019. Krueger had written a companion novel to Ordinary Grace, that was accepted and revised, but he pulled it at the last minute and revised it substantially over the next four years, incorporating elements from Adventures of Huckleberry Finn and the Odyssey. After these lengthy reviews, Krueger said "I am deeply in love with this book. I love it as much, if not more, than 'Ordinary Grace'."

It tracks the adventures of 12-year-old Odysseus "Odie" O'Bannion, his older brother Albert, and two of their friends after they flee the brutality of the (fictional) Lincoln Indian School, and travel by canoe down the (fictional) Gilead, Minnesota and Mississippi Rivers in hopes of reuniting with their aunt in St. Louis.

== Plot summary ==
In 1932, 12-year-old Odysseus "Odie" O'Bannion and his older brother Albert are the only two white children raised in the brutality of Lincoln Indian Training School in central Minnesota. The O'Bannions' best friend is Mose, a mute Sioux boy with a talent for baseball. As the three boys are going to be adopted by their kind teacher Cora, she is killed and her home is destroyed by a tornado. Since her husband had died previously, their orphaned daughter, Emmy is adopted by Clyde and Thelma Brickman, the cruel principals of the Lincoln School. When Odie accidentally kills one of the school's brutal teachers, the three escape downriver in a canoe with Emmy, with the goal of arriving in St. Louis to stay with Albert and Odie's Aunt Julia.

The group is soon captured by Jack, a WWI veteran with a missing eye and scarred face which leads Odie to call him The Pig-scarer. Over several days, the children and Jack grow closer, and they help him build a still. But when Emmy accidentally drops Jack's liquor bottle and he threatens her, Odie shoots him in the chest with Clyde's gun.

Fleeing further down-river, the boys learn from news articles they are being accused of kidnapping Emmy and may be executed. Drawn by beautiful music and food, the children join a revival meeting of the Gideon Crusade, a snake-handling church led by Sister Eve, who performs faith healings. After Odie catches camp manager Sid paying off the recipients of "miraculous" healings, he confronts Sister Eve about her frauds. This startles Emmy, who accidentally releases rattlesnake Lucifer, who poisons Albert. As they wait for antivenom to arrive, Sister Eve explains that she had cured the actors once and let Sid convince her to hire them to "prime the pump" in new towns. The antivenom arrives just in time, but the story's publicity forces the children to flee again.

The children hide on an island near Mankato, Minnesota, discovering a murdered Indian child. This deeply disturbs Mose, who asks to be called by his Sioux name Amdacha (Broken-to-Pieces) from then on. Papers in the local library reveal his namesake great-uncle was killed in the mass execution there during the Dakota War of 1862. Odie gets lost in a Bonus Army riot. Following harmonica music to a local Hooverville, he joins the Schofields, an extended family of dispossessed Kansas farmers fleeing the Dust Bowl. The children eventually reunite, and Albert repairs the Schofields's car while Odie develops a romance with their girl Maybeth. He gives their alcoholic father gas money, and the groups separate.

The children reach Saint Paul, Minnesota, stay with lesbian restaurant owners Gertie and Flo in the Jewish ghetto, learn to hop freight, and go downtown with the intent of mailing a letter to Maybeth. Downtown, Odie is confronted by Jack, who survived the shot to his chest. Odie goes on alone, in increasing fear of being caught, but the other three children decide to stay in St. Paul.

Odie rides freight all the way to St. Louis, reaching Aunt Julia's house, only to gradually realize she is a madam and the house a brothel. Stunned, he wanders the huge St. Louis Hooverville until he stumbles across the Gideon Crusade, where Sister Eve encourages him to return to Julia. Doing so, Julia explains that she is actually Odie's mother. The Brickmans force their way into the room. It is revealed that Thelma Brickman, like Julia, was once a prostitute, and that she killed Odie's bootlegging father Zeke. She shoots and injures Odie. Julia throws herself on Thelma and both fall from the window, killing Thelma and paralyzing Julia.

In an epilogue, Odie says he eventually married Maybeth and tells this (embellished) story to their great-grandchildren. Clyde Brickman served life in prison; Albert died in World War II; "The Silent Sioux Slugger" Amdacha quit professional baseball to reform the Indian education system. He considers Emmy, the only other surviving vagabond, a sister.

== Allusions to other work ==
Children traveling down midwestern American rivers to reunite with an aunt, pursued by unjust legal forces with racist overtones, is intended to be a modernized retelling of Mark Twain's Adventures of Huckleberry Finn. Krueger has said this is how he originally envisioned the book, but it gained more influences during rewrites.

The long water journey through many dangers is similar to the plot arc of the Odyssey. Odie got his name because he was born on Ithaca Street in St. Louis, both allusions to Homer's Odysseus, king of Ithaca. Odie's belief that he is cursed by a malevolent Tornado God is similar to the antagonistic relationship that Odysseus has to Poseidon. Albert's traveling pseudonym, Norman, explained in the text as coming from the 17-year-old being neither boy "nor man", is first told to the one-eyed veteran Jack, much the way Odysseus tells the cyclops Polyphemus his name is "Nobody". Odie is frequently drawn to other people by music, the way the sirens draw sailors with their songs. The section in which Odie spends time with the Schofield family and meets Maybeth Schofield is also similar to the time in the Odyssey spent on Calypso’s island, although the Schofields are less sinister. Upon arrival, Aunt Julie's brothel is unexpectedly full of rowdy men, the way Penelope's home has been invaded by unwanted suitors. Emmy's ability to see and manipulate the future resembles that of the Delphic Oracles.

The character of Sister Eve draws heavy inspiration for her complicated motivations from Sharon Falconer, the itinerant companion of Elmer in Sinclair Lewis's novel Elmer Gantry. Lewis's character in turn is inspired by the real-life Aimee Semple McPherson, whom Sid refers to (in text) as a role model for Sister Eve and the entire Gideon Crusade.

In an epilogue to the Audible version of the book, Krueger says he drew inspiration from Charles Dickens's criticism of the severe British boarding school system to write about Lincoln Indian School. He also relied heavily on first person accounts of survivors of the system.

== Critical reception ==
The novel was Krueger's first stand-alone work since the Edgar Award-winning Ordinary Grace, made the New York Times Best Sellers List on the first week of release, and remained for three weeks. Reviews were generally positive, and the novel was nominated for the 2020 Best Minnesota Novel/Short Story.
