= Split Rock River =

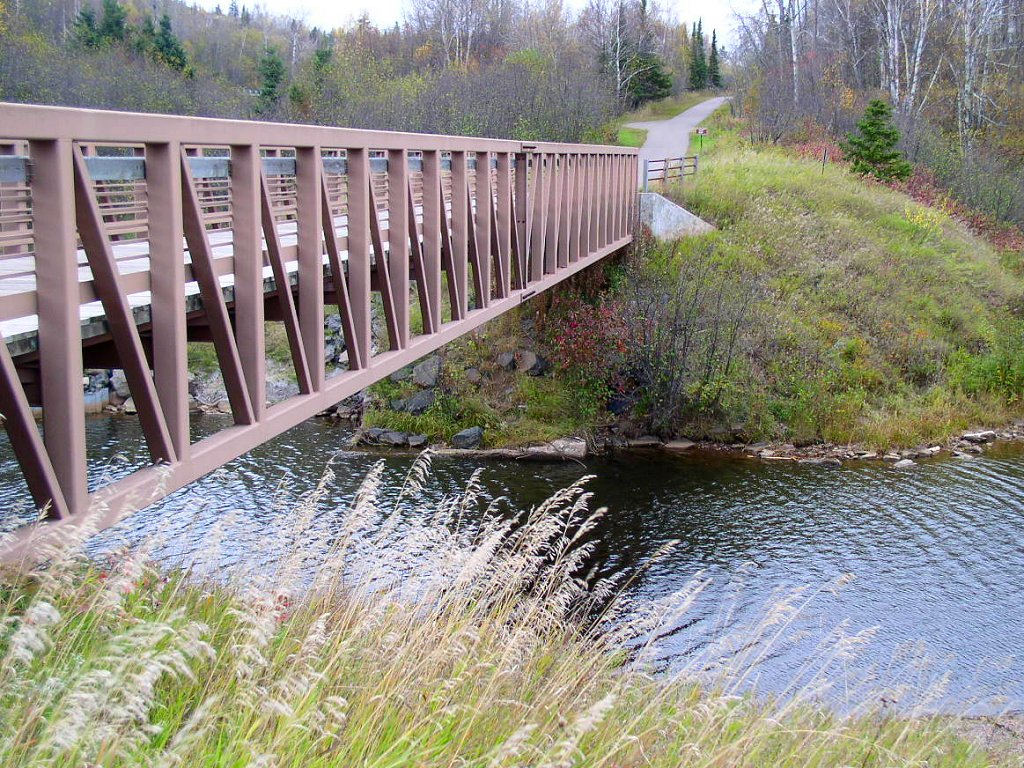
- The Gitchi-Gami State Trail crossing near the mouth of the Split Rock River

- Mouth of the Split Rock River

Location
- Country: United States
- State: Minnesota
- County: Lake County

Physical characteristics
- Source
  - location: Legler Lake, Silver Creek Township
  - coordinates: 47.3618646°N 91.5537776°W
  - elevation: 1,020 ft (310 m)
- Mouth
  - location: Lake Superior at Silver Creek Township
  - coordinates: 47°10′55″N 91°24′28″W
- Length: 3.5 miles (5.6 km)
- Basin size: 40 sq mi (100 km^{2})

The Split Rock River is a 3.5-mile-long (5.6 km) river of Minnesota, in the United States. It drains a small watershed of about 40 square miles (100 km^{2}) on the North Shore of Lake Superior. The name was used as early as 1825 and is believed to refer either to the steep-walled gorge carved by the river or to two cliffs east of the river mouth that appear split apart. An indigenous name for the river was Gininwabiho-zibi, meaning "War Eagle Iron River." The river's lower course flows through Split Rock Lighthouse State Park, and the Superior Hiking Trail ascends and descends both banks. There is a separate stream called Split Rock Creek nearby.

== Geography ==
The East and West Split Rock River branches arise in wetlands near Legler Lake. The branches join 3.5 miles (5.6 km) upstream from its mouth. Over the next two miles (3 km) the river drops 110 feet (34 m) in elevation, then drops 350 feet (110 m) over the next mile. Only in its final mile does the river level out and slow before emptying into Lake Superior.

There are ten waterfalls on the river, although because they can only be reached by a moderate hike on the Superior Hiking Trail they are lightly visited.

== History ==
From 1899 to 1906 the river basin was logged of its red and white pines. The logging operation included the town of Splitrock, Minnesota, at the river mouth and a 10-mile-long (16 km) rail line to carry lumber down to the lakeshore. During the Mataafa Storm of November 28, 1905, seven ships were wrecked within a dozen miles of the Split Rock River, including the steel steamboat William Edenborn right at its mouth. This prompted the construction of the Split Rock Lighthouse on a nearby cliff.
