= Splitrock, Minnesota =

Ghost town in Minnesota, United States

- Ghost town
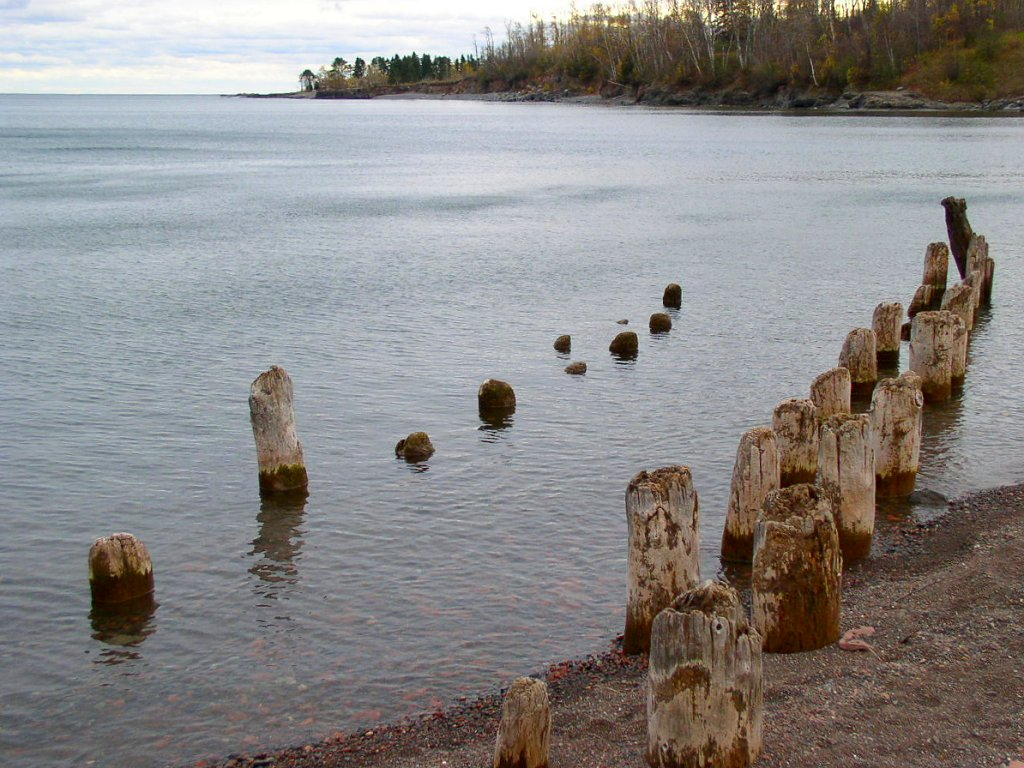
- Splitrock's wharf, the only obvious remains of the former townsite

- Location within Minnesota Location within the United States
- Coordinates: 47°10′58″N 91°24′28″W
- Country: United States
- State: Minnesota
- County: Lake
- Township: Beaver Bay
- Established: 1899
- Time zone: UTC-6 (Central (CST))
  - Summer (DST): UTC-5 (CDT)
- Area code: 218
- GNIS feature ID: 655032

Splitrock is an abandoned townsite in Beaver Bay Township, Lake County, Minnesota, United States; located at the mouth of the Split Rock River.

Splitrock was inhabited from 1899 to 1906 as a company town to house workers for a logging operation. The site is now within the borders of Split Rock Lighthouse State Park. The abandoned townsite is located 17 miles (27 km) northeast of the city of Two Harbors.

== History ==
Splitrock was developed as a logging camp by the Split Rock Lumber Company, a subsidiary of the Merrill and Ring Lumber Company. About 350 men worked in the Split Rock River valley felling red and white pine. The lumber company controlled the town's harbor, railroad, coal dock, and store (which included a post office). Early maps show the community as Splitrock, Split Rock, Split Rock Point, or Waterville.

The company built a railroad 10 miles (16 km) long to carry cut logs down to the river mouth, where they were dumped into the water from a trestle platform. Although the railroad never connected to any other lines, it was incorporated as the Split Rock and Northern Railroad to qualify for a common carrier tax break. The logs were sluiced from a dammed area at the river mouth into the lake, where they were rounded up into rafts and towed to a sawmill in Duluth by the company's tugboat Gladiator. Unusually, the Gladiator stocked carrier pigeons to carry distress messages to the company office.

By 1906 the operation had cut 200,000,000 board feet (500,000 m^{3}) of lumber, netting a highly successful profit of $863,454. With most of the valuable timber gone, logging operations ceased and the town and railroad were dismantled the following year. The cutover land suffered further from multiple forest fires. The only obvious vestige of the town are pilings from the wharf and train trestle, which was about 184 feet (56 m) long and 16 feet (5 m) wide, still visible jutting from the water at the mouth of the Split Rock River.
