= Barton Sutter =

American poet

Barton Sutter is a Duluth, Minnesota-based writer of poetry and prose. His work reflects his love of the north country.

== Early life ==
Barton Sutter is a Lutheran preacher's son and was raised in a large rural family. He received a B.A. in language arts from Southwest State University in 1972 and an M.A. in creative writing from Syracuse University in 1975. He moved to Duluth, Minnesota in the 1980s, where he continued publishing and also began work as an English instructor at the University of Minnesota Duluth. He then spent a number of years as a senior lecturer of English at the University of Wisconsin-Superior, retiring from that position in 2010. He occasionally appears as half of the artistic duo "The Sutter Brothers" with his brother, Ross Sutter, a folk musician. Sutter lives in Duluth with his wife and two daughters.

== Career ==
Sutter was an essayist for the "Voices from the Heartland" series on Minnesota Public Radio from 1991 to 1997. He has published poems, stories, and essays in such publications as The North American Review, Poetry, Live Music, Minneapolis Star Tribune, and Minnesota Monthly.

Sutter is the only author to win the Minnesota Book Award in three separate categories: in fiction for My Father's War and Other Stories, in creative non-fiction for Cold Comfort, and in poetry with The Book of Names: New and Selected Poems. Sutter was also appointed Poet Laureate of Duluth, the first in Duluth history. He was unanimously chosen for the position by a committee set up by the Lake Superior Writers.

== Works ==
- Cedarhome (1977)
- Pine Creek Parish Hall and Other Poems (1985)
- My Father's War and Other Stories (1991)
- The Book of Names: New and Selected Poems (1993)
- Cold Comfort: Life on the Top of the Map (1998)
- Farewell to the Starlight in Whiskey (2004)
- Chester Creek Ravine: Haiku (2015)

== Awards ==
- Bassine Citation from the Academy of American Poets, 1986
- Loft McKnight Award in Poetry, 1987
- Minnesota Book Award for Fiction, 1992
- Minnesota Book Award for Poetry, 1994
- Northeastern Minnesota Book Award, 1999
- Minnesota Book Award for Creative Non-Fiction, 1999
- George Morrison Artist Award, 2005
- Duluth Poet Laureate, 2006
