= Split Rock Lighthouse State Park =

State park in Minnesota, United States

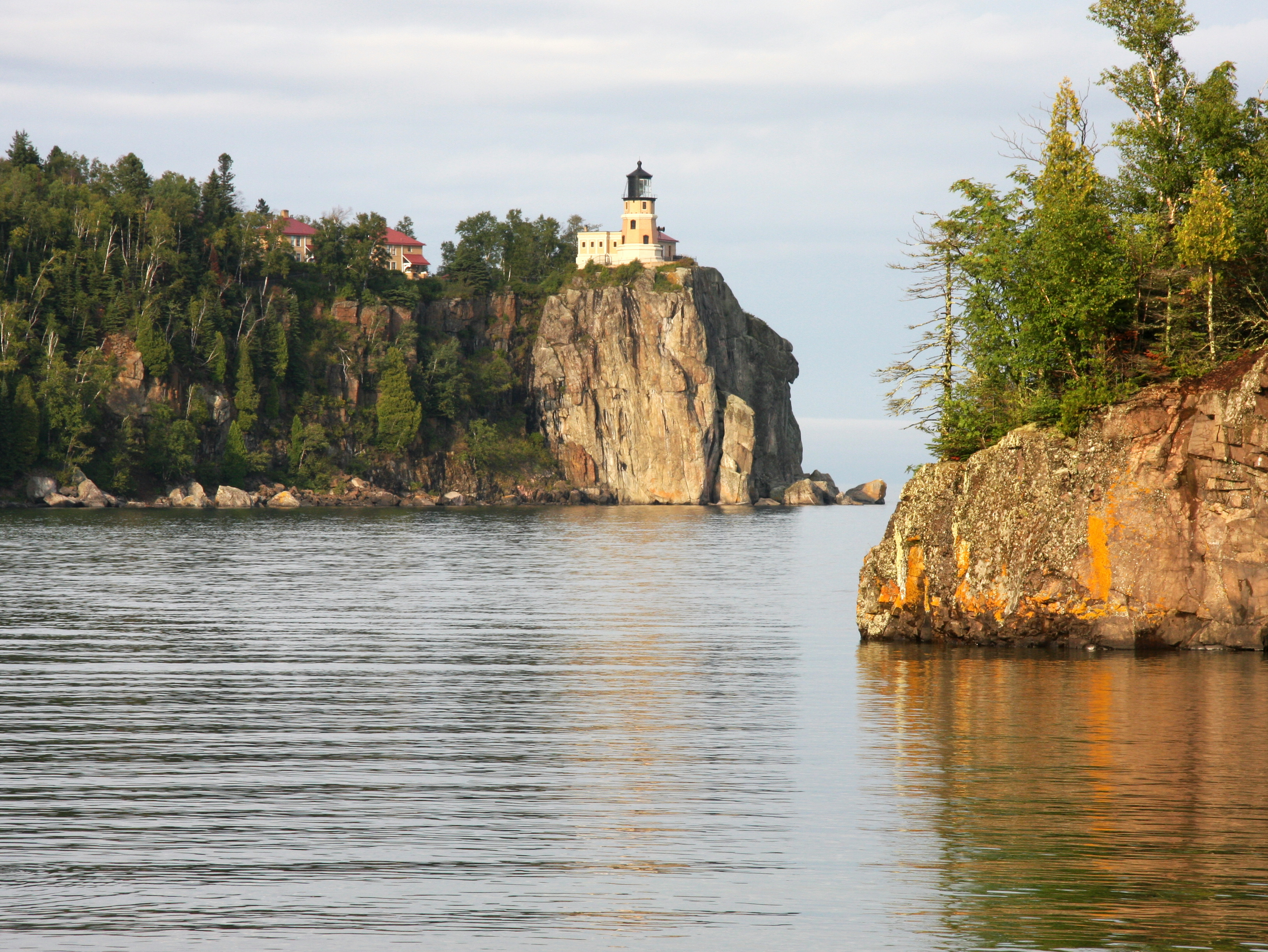
- Split Rock Lighthouse State Park seen from the shore of Lake Superior

- Location within Minnesota Location within the United States
- Location: Lake, Minnesota, United States
- Coordinates: 47°11′31″N 91°23′34″W
- Area: 2,200 acres (8.9 km^{2})
- Elevation: 728 ft (222 m)
- Established: 1945
- Named for: Split Rock Lighthouse
- Governing body: Minnesota Department of Natural Resources

Split Rock Lighthouse State Park is a state park of Minnesota on the North Shore of Lake Superior. It is best known for the picturesque Split Rock Lighthouse, one of the most photographed lighthouses in the United States. Built by the United States Lighthouse Service in 1910, the lighthouse and some adjacent buildings have been restored and the Minnesota Historical Society operates them as a museum. The park is 2,200-acre (890 ha).

== Natural history ==
=== Geography ===
Split Rock Lighthouse State Park encompasses about four miles (6.4 km) of rocky shoreline on Lake Superior with several prominent headlands. Named features of the shore, from southwest to northeast, are the mouth of the Split Rock River, Split Rock Point, Crazy Bay, Corundum Point, the mouth of Split Rock Creek, Day Hill, Little Two Harbors, Stony Point (site of the lighthouse), and Gold Rock Point. The name Little Two Harbors comes from the division of the inlet by a small island, formerly a tombolo, and refers to the city of Two Harbors farther down the shore. There are two shallow sea caves at the base of Stony Point.

The east and west branches of the Split Rock River, not to be confused with Split Rock Creek, join in the park. There are ten waterfalls on the river, although because they can only be reached by a moderate hike on the Superior Hiking Trail and are not marked on park maps, they are lightly visited.

=== Geology ===
Much of the shore of Lake Superior is made of basalt erupted from the Midcontinent Rift System when the middle of the North American Plate began to crack 1.1 billion years ago. In a small tract that includes Split Rock Lighthouse State Park, additional magma intruded into the basalt and cooled underground into a harder rock called diabase. These flows also carried with them blocks of anorthosite, an even harder rock from the base of the Earth's crust, which became interspersed randomly in the diabase. Three large blocks of anorthosite form Corundum Point, Day Hill, and Stony Point beneath the lighthouse. In the southwest portion of the park another eruption formed a layer of red rhyolite. The rhyolite has eroded into several natural pillars, and forms the walls of the Split Rock River gorge.

Beginning 2 million years ago a series of glacial periods repeatedly covered the region with ice, scouring the bedrock and scooping out a great basin. The glaciers, and later meltwater, wore away less resistant rock, leaving behind hills and ridges of the harder diabase and anorthosite. At the end of the last glacial period the basin filled with meltwater. The water level fluctuated significantly over time due to blockages of the outlet and post-glacial rebound. The high-water Glacial Lake Duluth deposited clay sediments inland, while later, lower precursors of Lake Superior eroded bluffs and beach terraces.

=== Flora and fauna ===
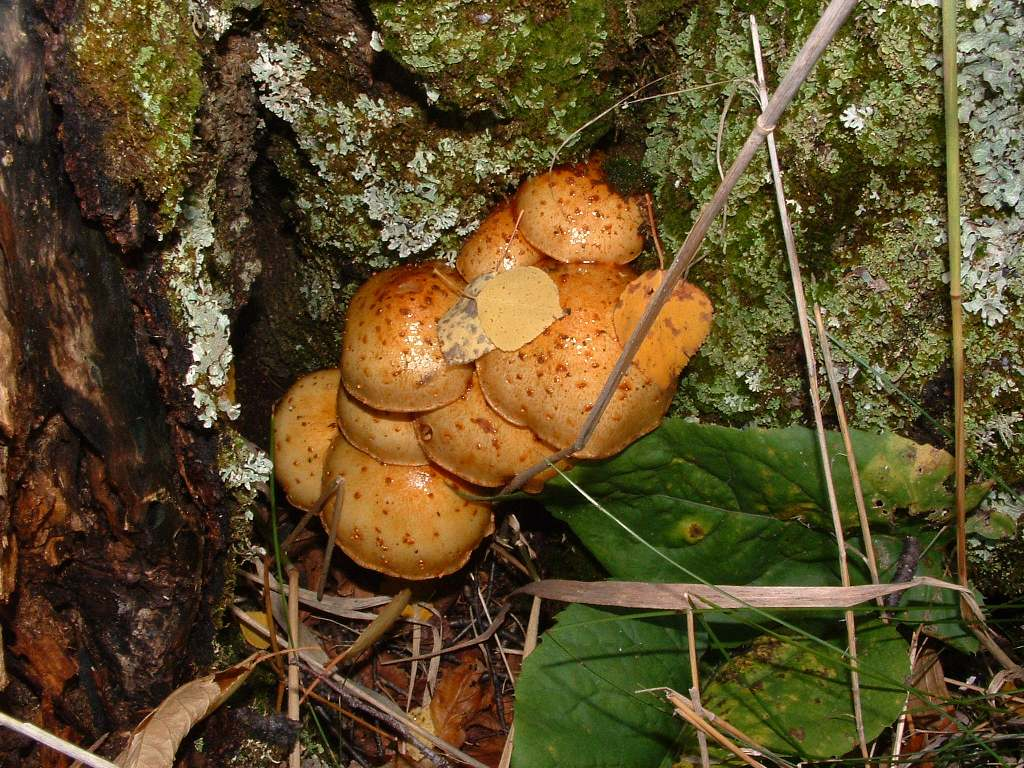
Vegetation in the park

The park was originally forested with red and white pine. However, these were heavily logged at the beginning of the 20th century, and wildfires sweeping through the cutover land killed many of the remaining saplings and seedlings. Today the vegetation is primarily birch with some spruce, fir, and ash trees.

Mammals found in the park include white-tailed deer, moose, black bears, raccoons, snowshoe hares, red foxes, bobcats, and Canadian lynxes. A colony of beavers lives on the Split Rock River. Birds include herring gulls, common loons, and a variety of songbirds. Peregrine falcons nest on the lakeside cliffs.

== Cultural history ==
=== Early history ===
Several vestiges of early 20th-century industry are visible in the park. The first white settlement in the Split Rock area was Little Two Harbors, a commercial fishing village populated largely by Norwegian immigrants. The men of the village fished for trout, whitefish, and herring from 16 to 18 foot skiffs in the fall and winter. Little Two Harbors was inhabited until 1925, although in later years only 4 or 5 residents lived there year-round. Cement foundations of houses and fish processing buildings remain.

A logging camp known as Splitrock existed at the mouth of the Split Rock River from 1899 to 1906. Pilings from their dam and wharf are still visible jutting from the water. The Merrill Logging Trail follows the route of their 10-mile (16 km) rail line. In 1901 a prospector from Duluth misidentified the outcrops of anorthosite as corundum, an extremely hard mineral valuable as an industrial abrasive. Three years later the North Shore Abrasives Company set up mining operations on Corundum Point, but abandoned the site in 1908 when their product was found to be inadequate. Their crushing house burned down in a forest fire in 1910 but its concrete footings remain.

Another remnant from this period is a finely crafted, freestanding stone fireplace atop Day Hill. According to local legend it was the start of a house built around 1900 by Frank Day, a businessman from Duluth, for himself and his sweetheart, but abandoned when she did not reciprocate his love.

=== Split Rock Lighthouse ===
Three violent storms struck the Great Lakes in November 1905, killing 116 sailors. One, the Mataafa Storm of November 28, damaged nearly 30 ships on Lake Superior. Two ships were wrecked against the future park's shore, the steel steamboat William Edenborn and a barge it was towing, the Madeira. The Edenborn was beached far ashore at the mouth of the Split Rock River and later salvaged, but one of the 25 crewmembers was killed. The Madeira with 10 men aboard drifted northeast until violent waves began smashing her against the cliffs of Gold Rock Point. Crewman Fred Benson managed to leap onto the rocks and scale the cliff in the midst of the snowstorm. The first mate was swept overboard and drowned, but Benson was able to lower a rope and pull the other eight crew to safety. The Madeira sank in pieces at the foot of Gold Rock while the crewmen, suffering from exposure and frostbite, found shelter with local fishermen and loggers. Both crews were picked up two days later by the tugboat Edna G.

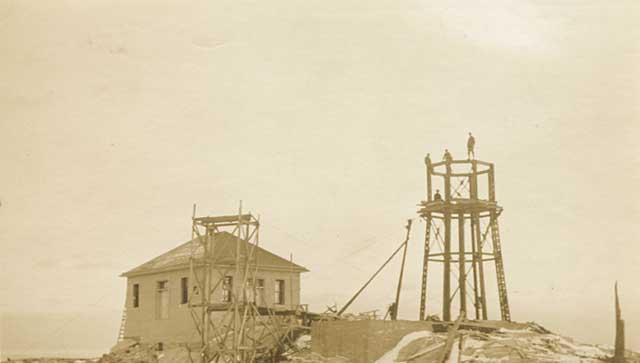
Split Rock Lighthouse under construction in 1909

The shipping companies that had sustained losses in the storms lobbied the federal government for an expanded system of navigational aids on the Great Lakes. Besides the Edenborn and the Madeira, five other ships had been damaged within a dozen miles of the Split Rock River. A signal in that area was at the top of the industry's list of demands. The site ultimately selected for the lighthouse and fog signal was 2.5 miles (4.0 km) northeast of the Split Rock River, on Stony Point. There were no roads yet up the North Shore, so all construction materials were brought in by barge and hoisted up the cliff with a derrick and a steam-powered hoist. By midsummer 1910 work was complete on the lighthouse, foghorn building, and three houses for the lighthouse keepers.

The derrick remained the only way to bring supplies up the cliff until the lighthouse staff built a tramway in 1915–16. The station finally became accessible by a road, now Minnesota State Highway 61, completed in 1929. Five years later a crew from the Civilian Conservation Corps built a new access road and lighthouse tenders were provided with a truck to bring in supplies by land, so the tramway was dismantled.

The picturesque lighthouse, perched on a 130-foot cliff overlooking the world's largest lake, began attracting small numbers of visitors within weeks of its opening. However the completion of Highway 61 opened the floodgates to tourism. In 1938 it was estimated that 100,000 visitors stopped by, five times more than any other federally operated lighthouse. Some of the lighthouse keepers' children opened a souvenir stand just outside the station entrance in 1941. Both the U.S. Lighthouse Service and the U.S. Coast Guard which absorbed it in 1939 were obliged to add seasonal staff to help conduct tours.

=== State park creation ===
In 1945 Clarence R. Magney, a former mayor of Duluth turned associate justice of the Minnesota Supreme Court, noticed a sign near the Baptism River reading "Lake and River Frontages for Sale." A staunch advocate of public lands on the North Shore, Magney determined to protect some of this land from the development boom that would accompany the end of World War II. At this time Gooseberry Falls was the only Minnesota state park on Lake Superior. A bill promoted by Magney easily passed in the Minnesota Legislature, creating both Baptism River State Park (now Tettegouche State Park) and Split Rock State Scenic Wayside. The 35-acre (14 ha) wayside consisted of a hill offering a view of the Split Rock Lighthouse.

Due to its popularity with tourists, the lighthouse was kept operating well after radar and other technology had rendered it obsolete. However, by 1967 the Coast Guard was considering decommissioning the station. The state legislature acted to expand the wayside into a full-fledged state park including the lighthouse itself. The station was officially closed in 1969 after 59 years of service. Under the Surplus Property Act the grounds and buildings were transferred to the state of Minnesota for free to be operated as a historic site.

The state parks division developed an entrance station, picnic grounds, roads, and trails. The Minnesota Historical Society took over management of the lighthouse station in 1976. Over the next decade they restored several buildings to their 1920 appearance and constructed a $1.2 million history center. Meanwhile, from 1984 to 1990 the state park spent $555,000 to improve the recreational facilities, including a new access road, picnic area, and all-season trail shelter, and an expanded trail system. They also developed the park's first campground, an unconventional design in which campers wheel their equipment to their sites in carts provided by the park.

The Split Rock Trading Post, just outside and unaffiliated with the state park, operated from 1960 up to 1999, when it burned down in a fire. In addition to a kitschy gift shop, this tourist trap once boasted live bears in cages, the anchor of the Madeira, and a wooden tower offering a view of the lighthouse.

Gold Rock Point, the headland just north of the lighthouse, was not originally part of the state park. In 1997 it was purchased from its private owners by the Parks & Trails Council of Minnesota, an organization founded by Clarence Magney, among others, to buy and hold worthy properties until state legislation can authorize their public acquisition. The next year Nadine Blacklock, a nature photographer and president of the Parks and Trails Council, was killed in a car accident just outside the north end of the park. The Council and the Blacklock Nature Sanctuary, an art and conservation non-profit organization she and her family had founded, jointly purchased 80 acres (32 ha) of land around the accident site. 43 acres (17 ha) were transferred to the state park while the remainder, with an existing one-bedroom cabin, is managed by the Blacklock Nature Sanctuary as an artists' retreat. The additions were developed with access features for Madeira wreck divers and the Gitchi-Gami State Trail, a paved bicycling route in development along the North Shore.

== Recreation ==
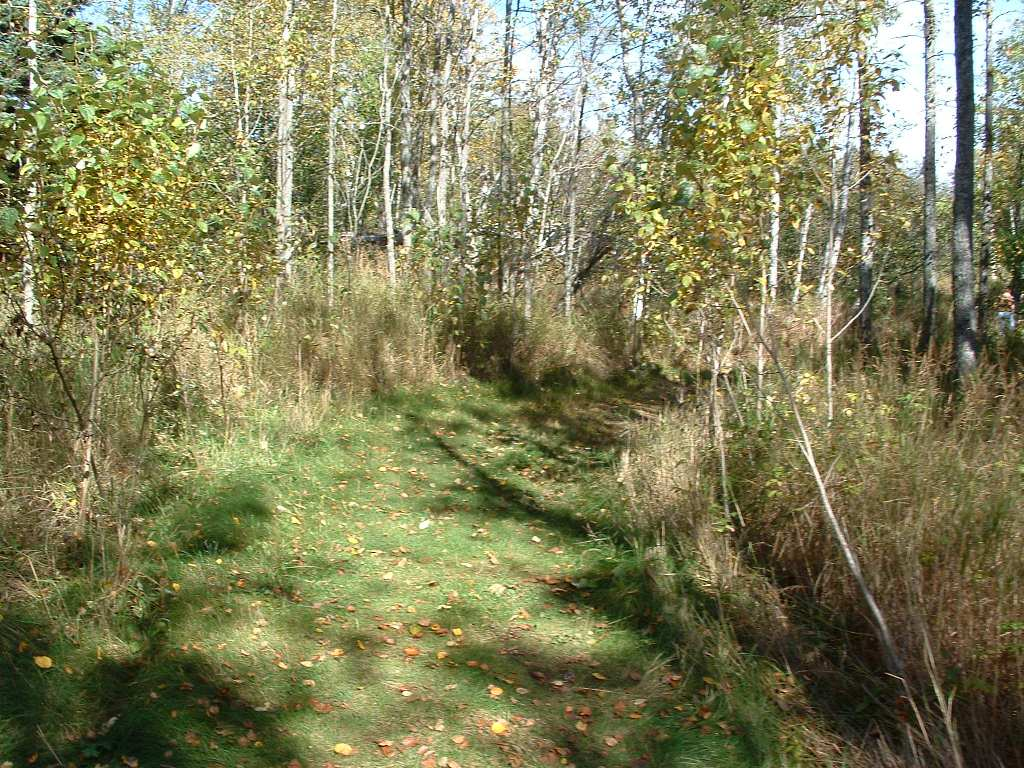
A hiking trail in the park

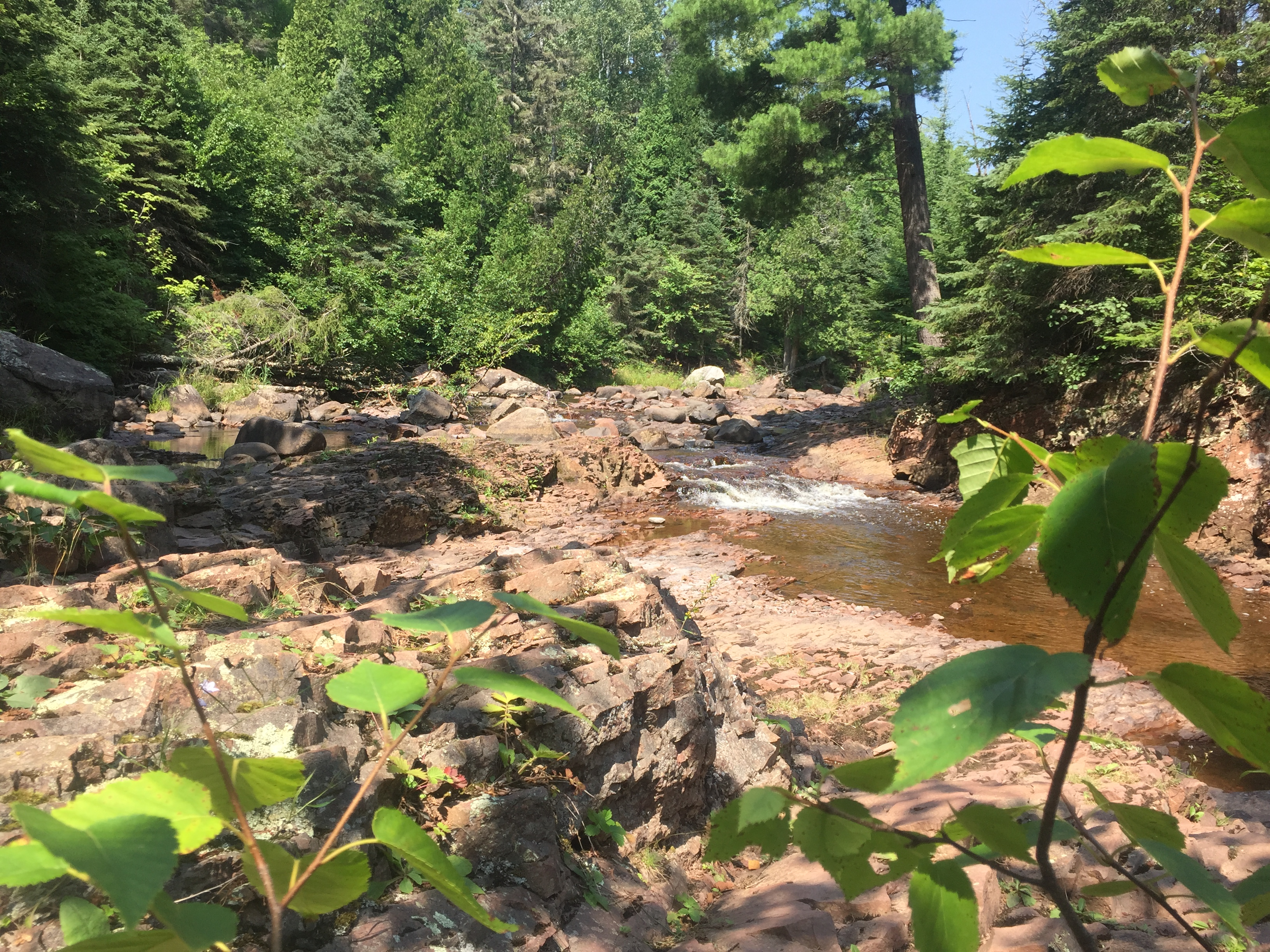
West Split Rock River alongside the Superior Hiking Trail, approximately 1/2 mile downstream from the Split Rock Camp Sites in the Split Rock State Park area.

Split Rock Lighthouse State Park has a unique cart-in campground with 20 secluded campsites and a modern restroom. Campers leave their vehicles in a parking lot and use two-wheeled carts provided by the park to carry their equipment a short distance to their site. There are four backpack campsites along the shore, two accessible to sea kayakers. Conventional drive-in campgrounds managed by the state park are available in two state forests in the area. An expansion of the state park campground, to include 60 drive-in sites, has been approved and construction may begin in summer 2010.

The park contains 14.5 miles (23.3 km) of trails for hiking, bicycling, and cross-country skiing. There are several overlooks providing views of the lighthouse and Lake Superior. A paved section of the Gitchi-Gami State Trail runs through the park near the shore, while the Superior Hiking Trail runs inland and skirts both the Split Rock River and Split Rock Creek. There is a lakeshore picnic area and two picnic shelters, one open year-round.

Water recreation includes boating, sea kayaking, and fishing for lake trout, salmon, and brown trout. The park also provides scuba diving access to the Madeira wreck, which is on the National Register of Historic Places. Divers can also see parts of the Madeira in Little Two Harbors, where they were dumped in 1974 after an aborted salvage operation. Underwater artifacts from the settlements of Splitrock and Little Two Harbors can be seen in their respective bays.

=== Park events ===
The park's trail center hosts various public events, including music performances, nature walks, and history programs. Every year on November 10, the beacon of the lighthouse is lighted to commemorate the sunken SS Edmund Fitzgerald. This event attracts nearly 900 people each year.
