= Craig Blacklock =

American nature photographer

Craig Blacklock (born 1954) is a nature photographer best known for his book The Lake Superior Images. His father, Les, and late first wife, Nadine, were also successful nature photographers. Blacklock has published eighteen books of photos, including several co-authored with Nadine, one of which, 1995's The Duluth Portfolio, won the Northeastern Minnesota Book Award. He produced A Voice Within: The Lake Superior Nudes, with his current wife, Honey, as the model, which won an IPPY award as the best photography book from over 1300 independent publishers.

Blacklock primarily used 4x5 film cameras during his early career, and is now fully digital. Blacklock currently lives in Moose Lake, Minnesota, where he runs Blacklock Photography Galleries. His newest book, which also is accompanied with a video, is ST. CROIX & NAMEKAGON RIVERS — The Enduring Gift, with an introduction by the late Vice President, Walter F. Mondale. This book won two gold IPPYs among its seven book awards. He is currently a Senior Fellow at the University of Minnesota's Center for Spirituality and Healing.
