= Sarah Stonich =

Sarah Stonich is an American writer and editor based in Minneapolis, Minnesota. Her novel Vacationland was published by the University of Minnesota Press in April 2013.

== Background and career ==
Novelist and screenwriter Sarah Stonich was born in Duluth, Minnesota. She moved to the Twin Cities in 1986, where she has worked in the literary community as a columnist, editor, and freelance writer. Her essays and short fiction have been published in Zyzzyva, Columbia Journal, and Minnesota Monthly. City Secrets: New York and many other magazines. Stonich has been a featured author at festivals and writer's conferences such as the San Miguel Allende Literary Conference, and the Aspen Writers Institute. She reviews books for the Minneapolis Star Tribune and other newspapers. She is also an editor and brander at WordStalkers. She has been a writer in residence at Hawthornden International Writer's Programme in Scotland; Ragdale Foundation in Chicago IL: The Tyrone Guthrie Centre in Ireland; The Michael King Writer's Center in Auckland, New Zealand; Art Omi in NY and Ucross in Wyoming, among others. Most recently Sarah has begun adapting her novels to television series and feature length scripts. She is married to musician Jon Ware and lives in Minneapolis.

Stonich's first novel, These Granite Islands, was originally published by Little Brown in 2001 and was translated into eleven languages, it won a Loft McKnight award, a Minnesota State Arts Board Award and the Friends of American Writers Award in addition to being a Barnes&Noble 'Discover Great New Writers pick'. It was most recently reissued by The University Of Minnesota Press.

Sarah's Northern trilogy is set in the Iron Range of Minnesota. "My settings tend to be the towns in the rural north where industry (mining) and recreation (the BWCAW) compete. This small town dynamic challenges characters who are 'townies' and tourists; young and old; mining advocates and environmentalists; sometimes pitting neighbor against neighbor, and always posing a delicate balance at this 'end of the road' community where land use issues are a constant.

== Awards and honors ==
2018: Minnesota Book Award

2018: Northeastern Minnesota Book Award

2011: Northeastern Minnesota Book Award

2004; 2013; 2018: Minnesota State Arts Board Career Development Grant.

2002: Shortlisted for Grand Prix Lectrices d’Elle for French translation of These Granite Islands

2000: Minnesota State Arts Board Fellowship

1999: Loft McKnight Fellowship for Fiction

=== Partial bibliography ===
These Granite Islands (2001, Little Brown & Co. 2015, University of Minnesota Press)

The Ice Chorus (2003, Little, Brown & Co.; re-released 2009, Alma Books UK)

Shelter (2011, Borealis Books. 2017 University Of Minnesota Press)

Vacationland (2013, University of Minnesota Press)

Laurentian Divide (2018, University Of Minnesota Press)

Fishing! (2020 University of Minnesota Press - originally published under pen name Ava Finch in 2015)

=== Reviews ===
Reviewing Vacationland, Kirkus Reviews said: "Each chapter renders a story complete, and the stories together weave a deeply mined narrative of place and people, elegiac yet life-affirming.”
