= Nadine Blacklock =

American nature photographer

- Born: 1953
- Died: 1998 (aged 44–45) near Two Harbors, Minnesota, U.S.
- Known for: Nature photography

Nadine Blacklock (1953–1998) was a nature photographer best known for her detailed nature photography of the Lake Superior area. She was married to Craig Blacklock, a well-known photographer in his own right. She died in a car accident on Highway 61 near Two Harbors, Minnesota.

The Blacklock Nature Sanctuary was founded in 1994 by Nadine Blacklock, along with her husband Craig Blacklock, as well as Les and Fran Blacklock. The Sanctuary is dedicated to preserving undeveloped land in Minnesota and providing artists and naturalists with working space. One site, in Moose Lake, Minnesota is situated on over 550 acres (2.2 km^{2}) of land with a Sanctuary residence. The residence is a fully furnished two-bedroom house with workstation and photo darkroom, plus there are two additional studio spaces. The second site with a one-room cabin is next to Split Rock Lighthouse State Park on Lake Superior.

The Blacklock Nature Sanctuary has an annual Artist Fellowship Program through a grant from the Jerome Hill Foundation to support Minnesota artists.
