= Ordinary Grace =

2013 novel written by William Kent Krueger

- First edition
- Author: William Kent Krueger
- Genre: Young adult, historical fiction, crime fiction
- Published: 2013
- Publisher: Atria Books
- Pages: 307
- Awards: Edgar Award for Best Novel (2014)
- ISBN: 978-1-451-64582-8
- Website: Ordinary Grace

Ordinary Grace is a novel by American author William Kent Krueger that was published by Atria Books on March 26, 2013. It won the Edgar Award for Best Novel in 2014.
