= Split Rock Lighthouse =

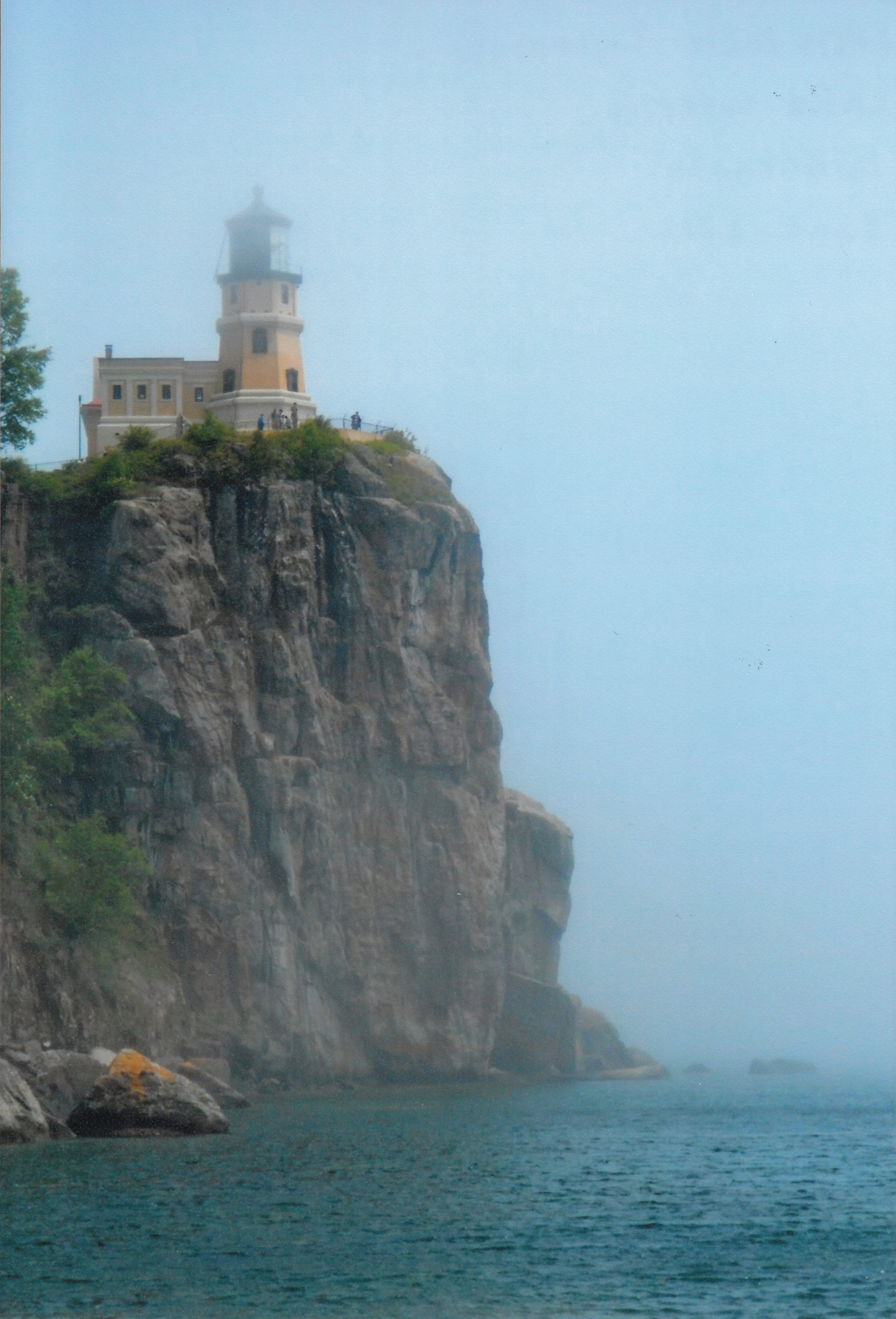
- Split Rock Lighthouse in June 2012
- Location: Split Rock Lighthouse State Park, Beaver Bay Township, Lake County, Minnesota
- Coordinates: 47.20005°N 91.3669°W

Tower
- Foundation: stone
- Construction: brick
- Height: 54-foot (16 m) tower on a 130-foot (40 m) cliff
- Shape: Octagonal
- Heritage: National Historic Landmark, National Register of Historic Places listed place

Light
- First lit: 1910
- Deactivated: 1969
- Focal height: 40 m (130 ft)
- Lens: 3rd order, bi-valve type Fresnel lens
- Range: 22 nautical miles (41 km; 25 mi)
- Characteristic: 0.5-second flash every 9.5 seconds
- Split Rock Lighthouse
- U.S. National Register of Historic Places
- U.S. National Historic Landmark
- Nearest city: Two Harbors, Minnesota
- NRHP reference No.: 69000073

Significant dates
- Added to NRHP: June 23, 1969
- Designated NHL: June 23, 2011
- Split Rock Lighthouse museum
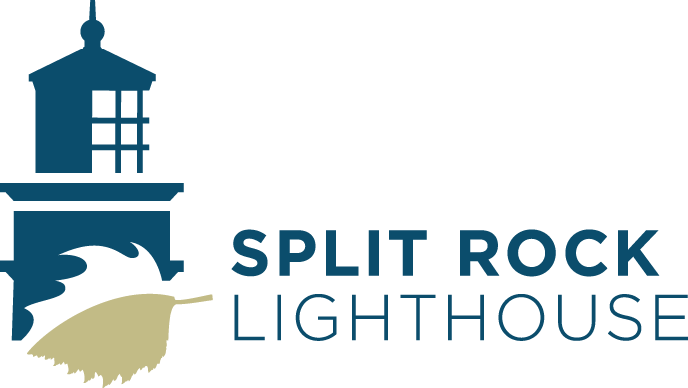

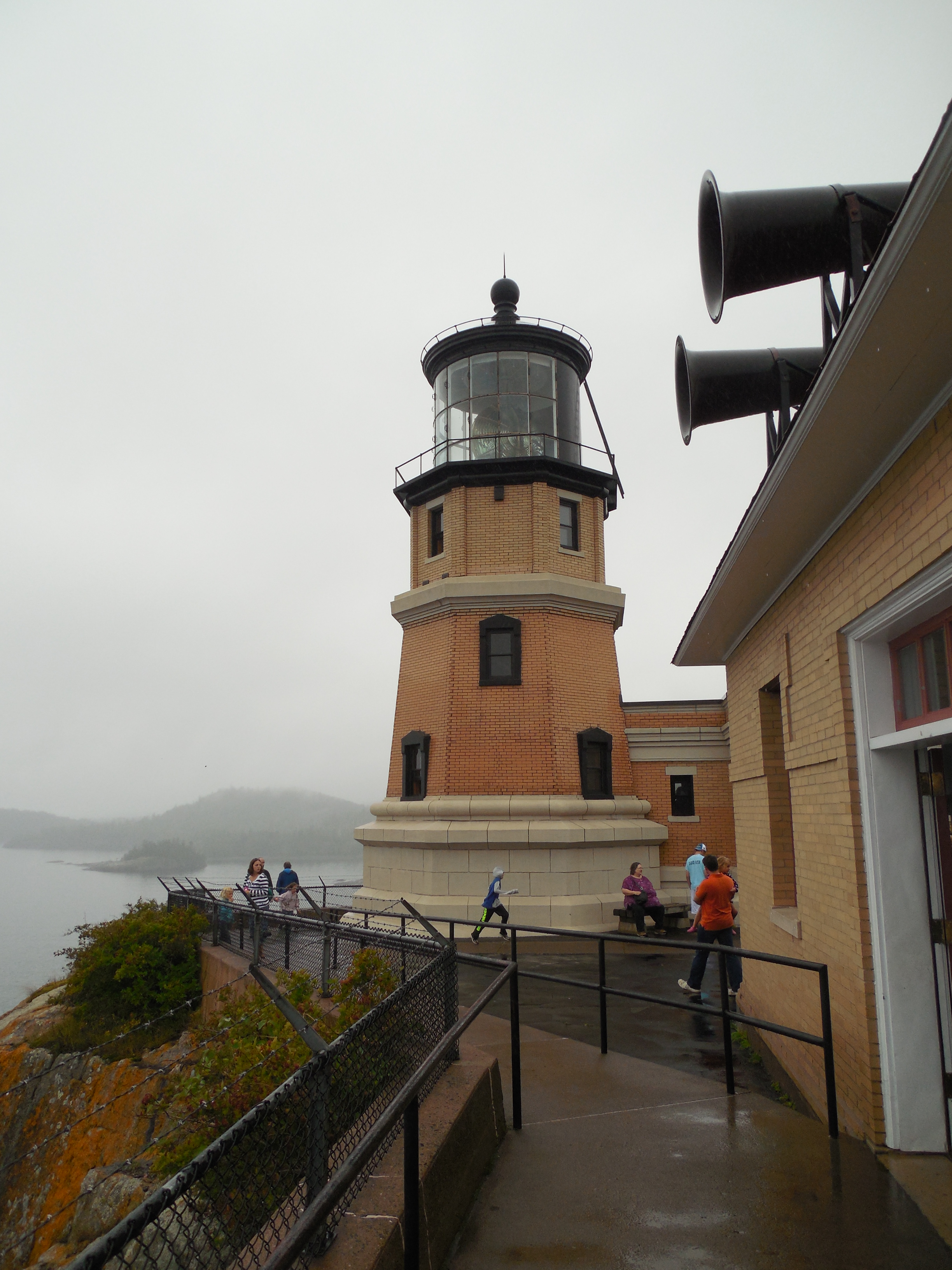
- Visitors at Split Rock Lighthouse. Fog Horn House in the foreground.
- Established: 1969
- Location: 3713 Split Rock Lighthouse Rd., Two Harbors, Minnesota USA
- Coordinates: 47.20005°N 91.3669°W
- Type: History Museum
- Visitors: 160,000
- Employees: Hayes Scriven, Lighthouse Keeper
- Website: https://www.mnhs.org/splitrock/

Split Rock Lighthouse is a lighthouse located southwest of Silver Bay, Minnesota, US on the North Shore of Lake Superior. The structure was designed by lighthouse engineer Ralph Russell Tinkham and was completed in 1910 by the United States Lighthouse Service for $75,000, including the buildings and the land. It is considered one of the most picturesque lighthouses in the United States.

== History ==
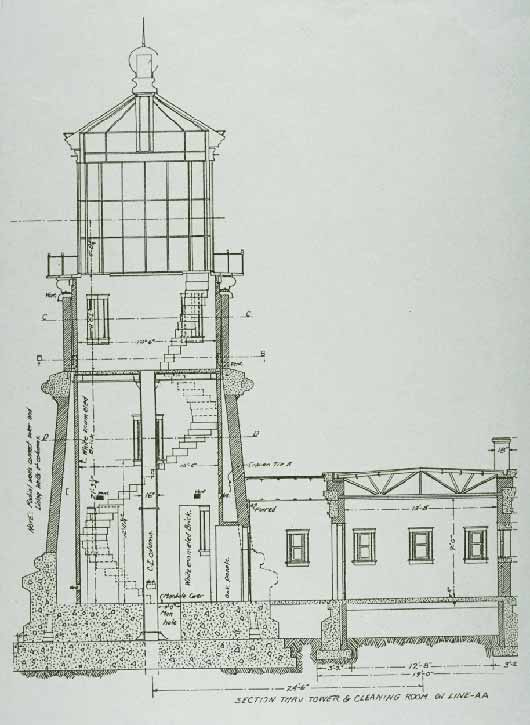
Architect's design

Split Rock Lighthouse was built in response to the great loss of ships during the famous Mataafa Storm of 1905, during which 29 ships were lost or damaged on Lake Superior. One of these shipwrecks, the Madeira, is located just north of the lighthouse.

The lighthouse stands on a 133-foot (41 m) sheer cliff eroded by wave action from a diabase sill containing inclusions of anorthosite. The octagonal building is a steel-framed brick structure with concrete trim on a concrete foundation set into the rock of the cliff. It is topped with a large, steel lantern which features a third order, bi-valve type Fresnel lens manufactured by Barbier, Bernard and Turenne Company in Paris. The tower was built for a second-order lens, but when construction went over budget, only enough funding remained for the smaller third-order lens. The lens floats on a bearing surface of liquid mercury which allows near frictionless operation. The lens is rotated by an elaborate clockwork mechanism that is powered by weights running down the center of the tower which are then reset by cranking them back to the top. When completed, the lighthouse was lit with a kerosene oil vapor lamp.

At the time of its construction, the area had no roads. All building materials and supplies arrived by water and were lifted to the top of the cliff by crane. The lamp was first lit on July 31, 1910. The lighthouse soon became a tourist attraction for sailors and excursion boats thanks to its scenic location. So much so, that in 1924 a road (now Minnesota State Highway 61) was built to allow land access.

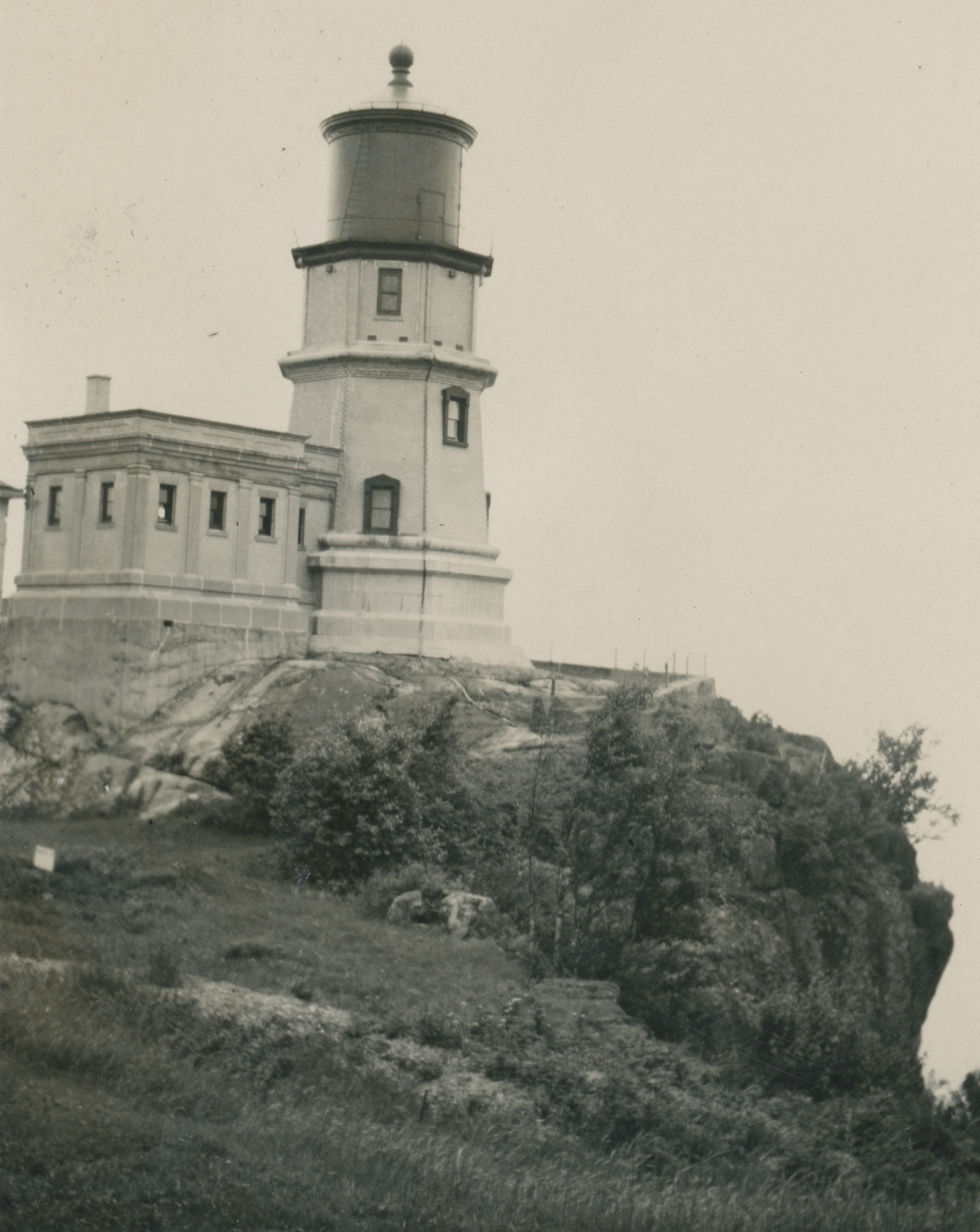
The lighthouse in June 1949

In 1940, the station was electrified, the lamp was replaced with a 1000-watt electric bulb, and the incandescent oil vapor lamp was moved to Au Sable Point Lighthouse in Northern Michigan. Split Rock was upgraded with a fog signal housed in a building next to the light tower. The original signal was a pair of sirens driven by two Franklin 30 hp (22 kW) gasoline-driven air compressors manufactured by Chicago Pneumatic Tool Company. In 1932 gasoline engines were replaced with diesel engines. The steam sirens were replaced with a Type F-2-T diaphone (be-you) type signal in 1936. The station and the fog signal were electrified four years later, but discontinued in 1961.

The light was retired in 1969 by the U.S. Coast Guard. The lighthouse is now part of the Split Rock Lighthouse State Park and is operated by the Minnesota Historical Society. The site includes the original tower and lens, the fog signal building, the oil house, and the three keepers' houses. It is restored to appear as it did in the late 1920s. The site was added to the National Register of Historic Places in 1969. Notwithstanding its retirement, every November 10 the lighthouse emits a light in memory of the SS Edmund Fitzgerald which sank on that date in 1975. On June 30, 2011, the lighthouse was designated as a National Historic Landmark.

The lighthouse keeper, Lee Radzak, worked at the lighthouse from 1982 to 2019, the longest tenure of any lighthouse keeper at the site.

== In art ==
The United States Postal Service issued a stamp that featured the light on June 17, 1995. It was one of five lighthouses chosen for the "Lighthouses of the Great Lakes" series postage stamp designed by Howard Koslow in 1995. There was one lighthouse chosen on each of the Great Lakes. The five lighthouses are Split Rock Light on Lake Superior, St Joseph Light on Lake Michigan, Spectacle Reef Light on Lake Huron, Marblehead Light (Ohio) on Lake Erie and Thirty Mile Point Light on Lake Ontario.

Because of its picturesque form and location, it has been the subject of many photographs and postcards. The lighthouse was also in the 2013 film The Great Gatsby.

== Gallery ==
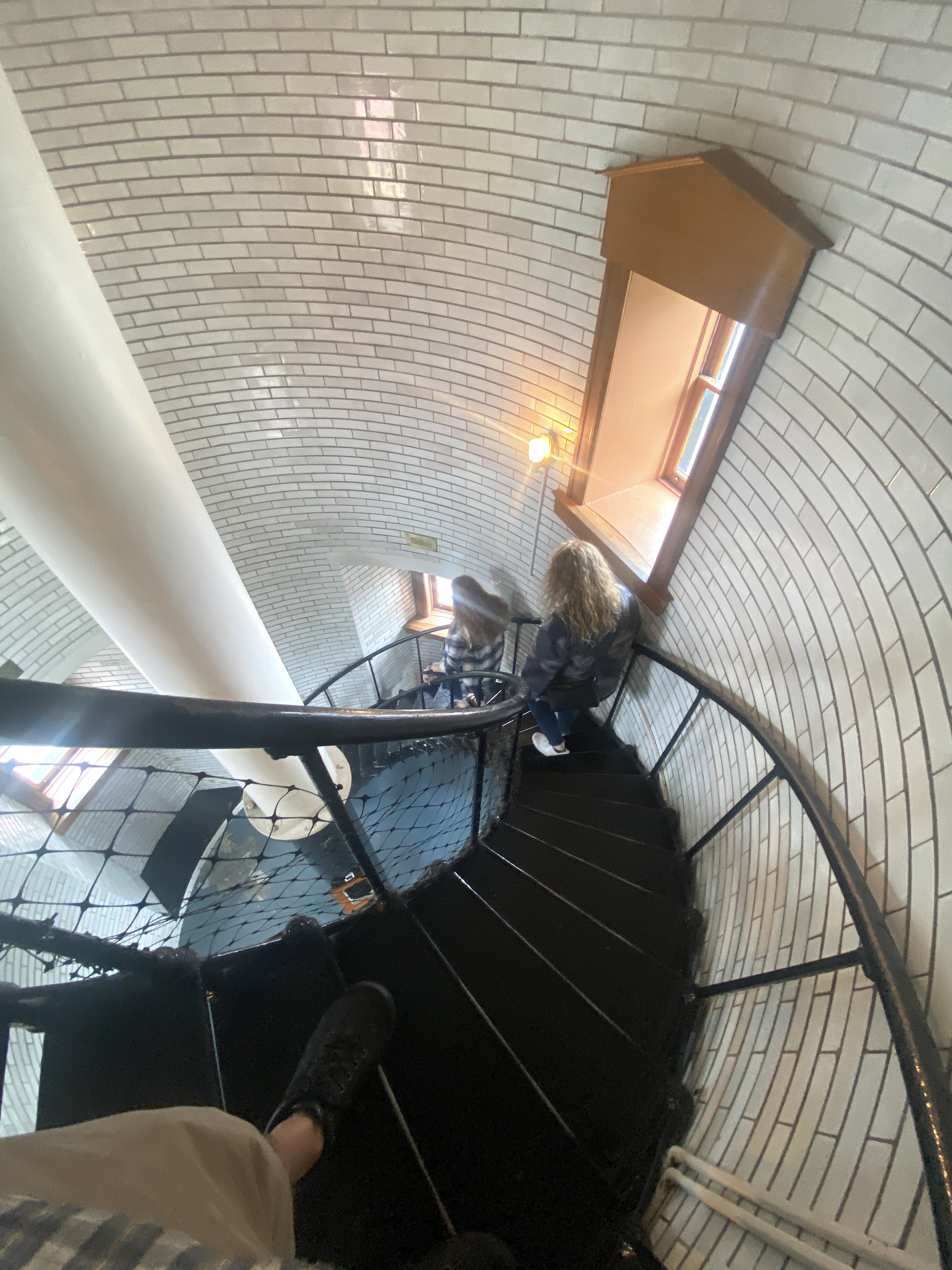
Interior stairs in Lighthouse

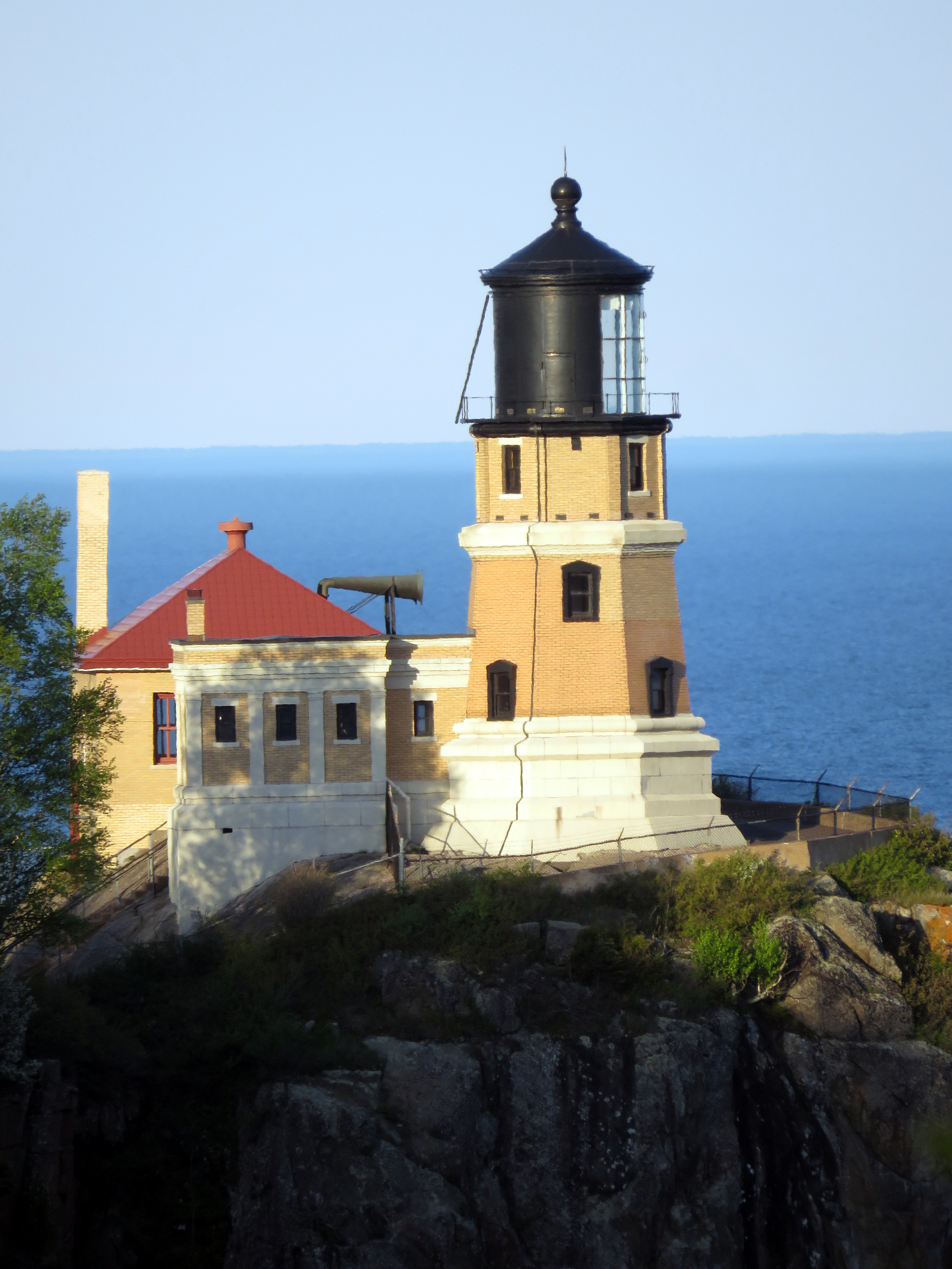
Distance view

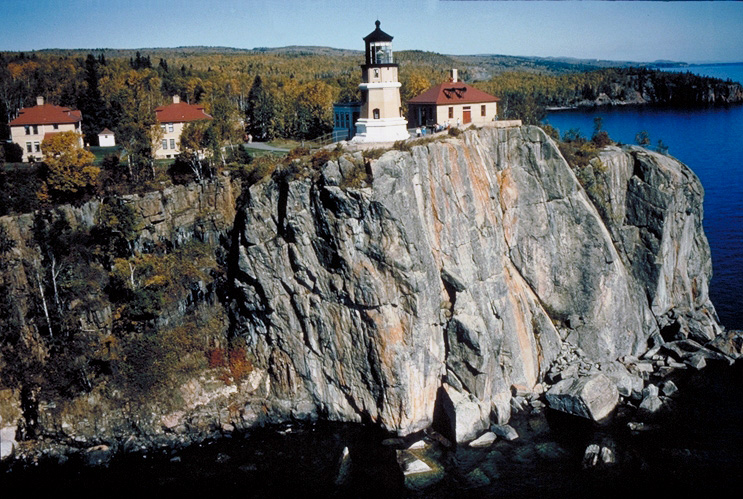
Aerial view

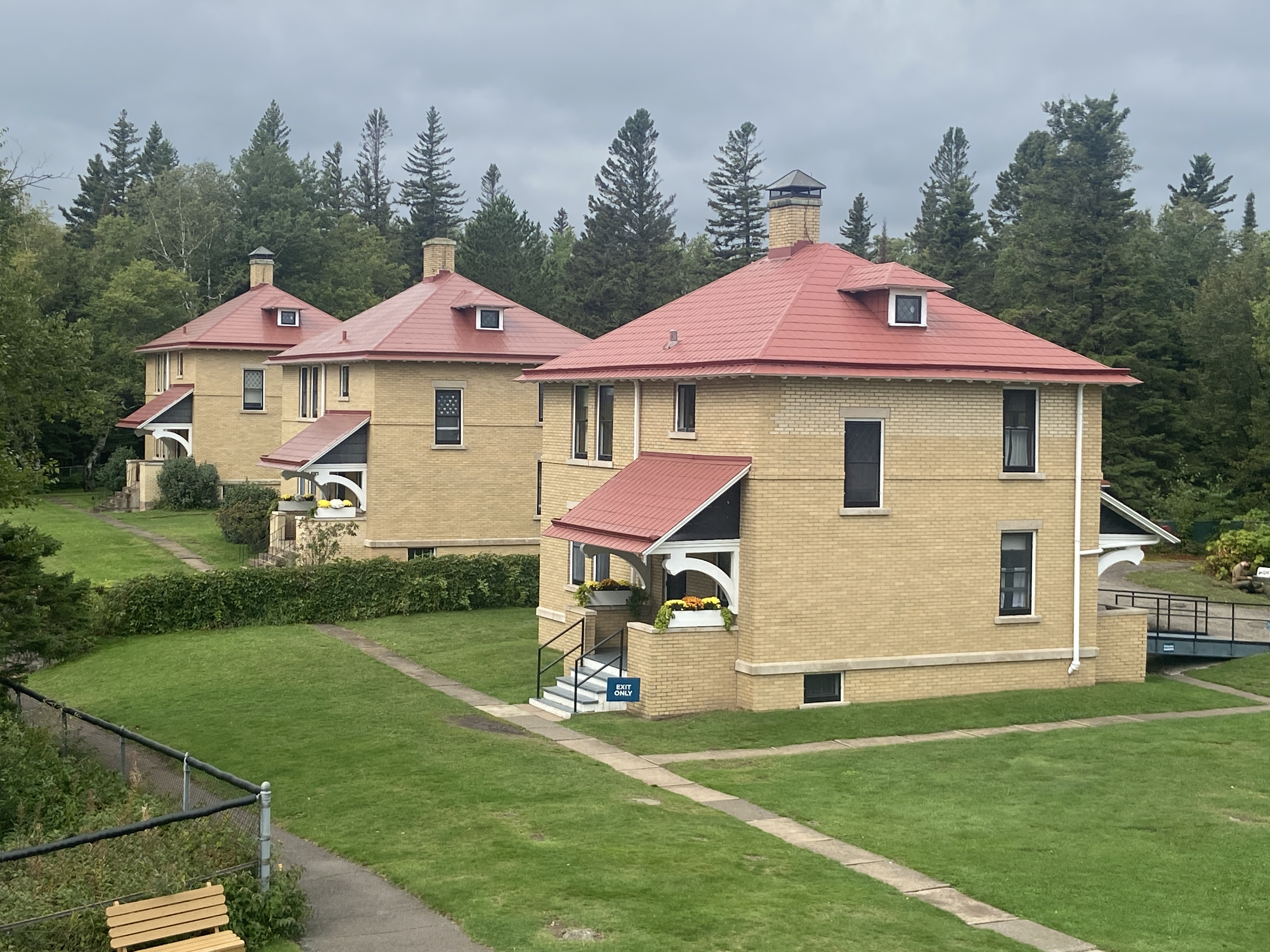
Lighthouse keepers' dwellings

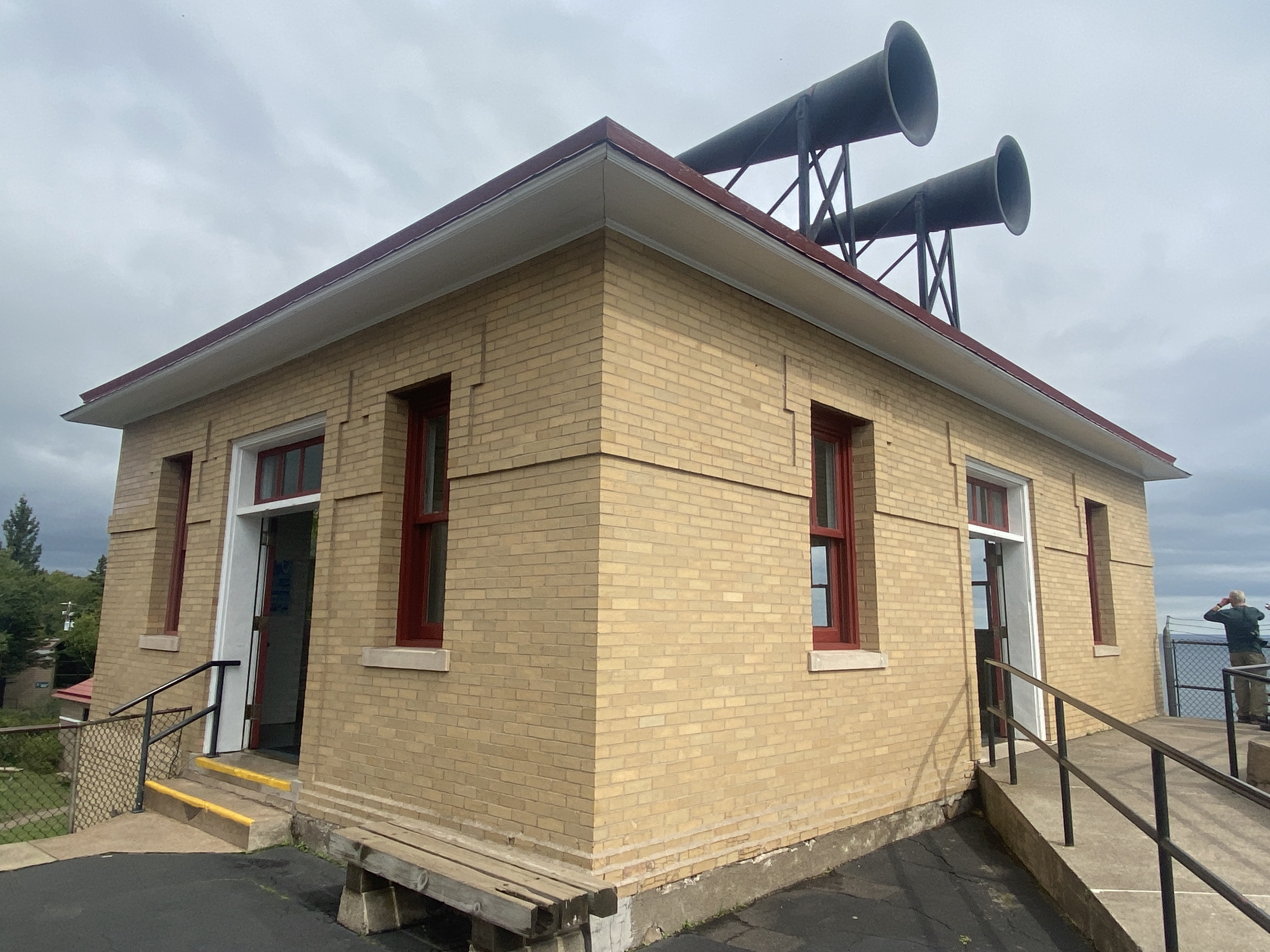
Fog signal building

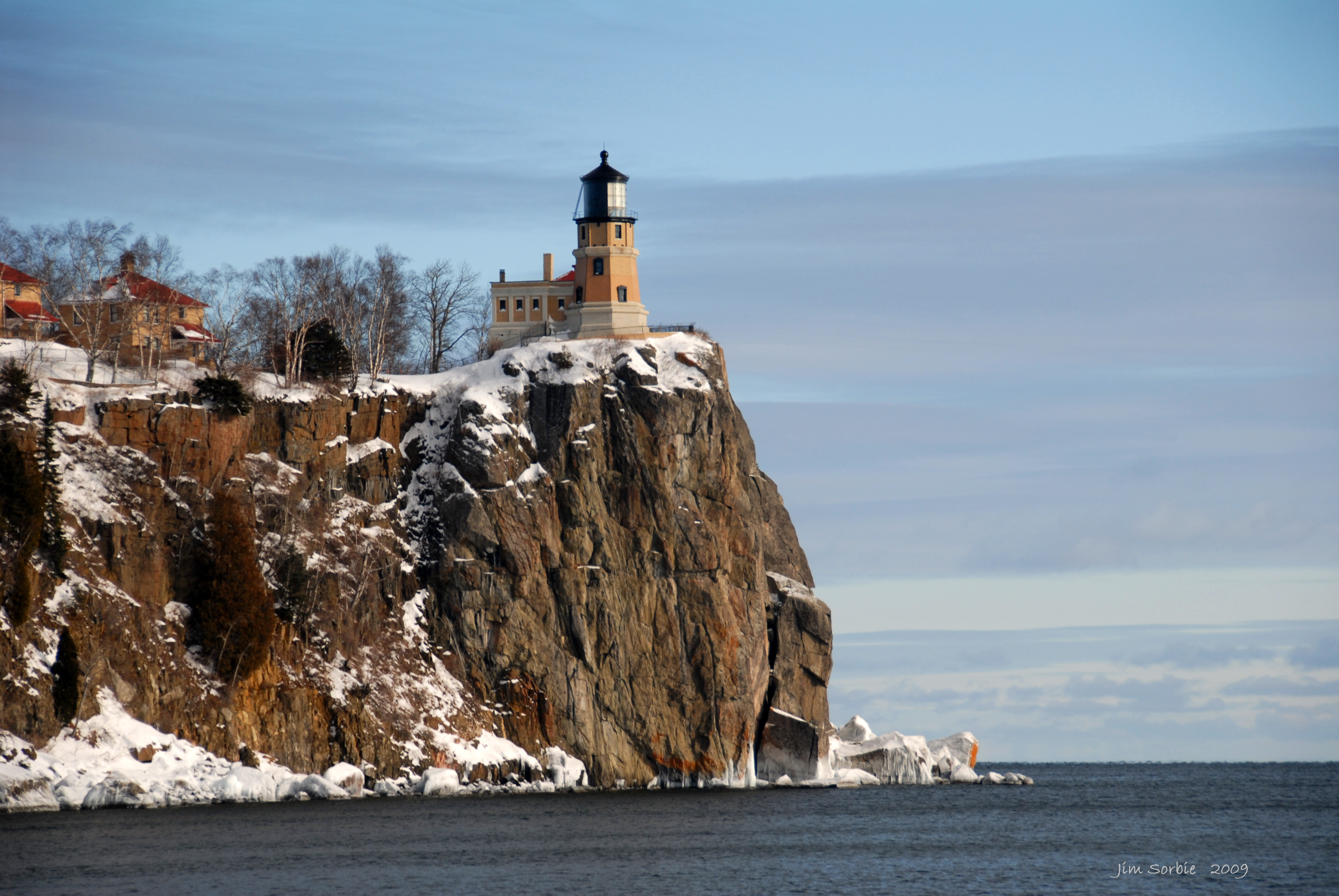
Lighthouse in winter

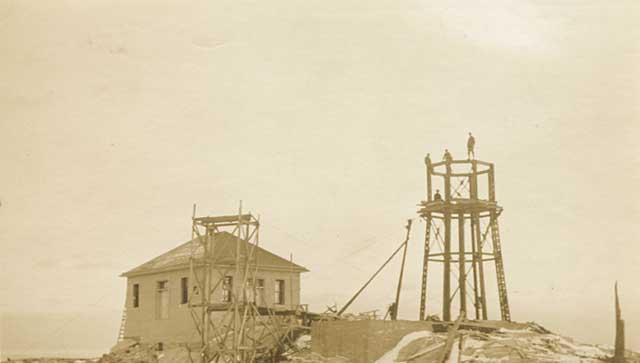
Construction, 1909

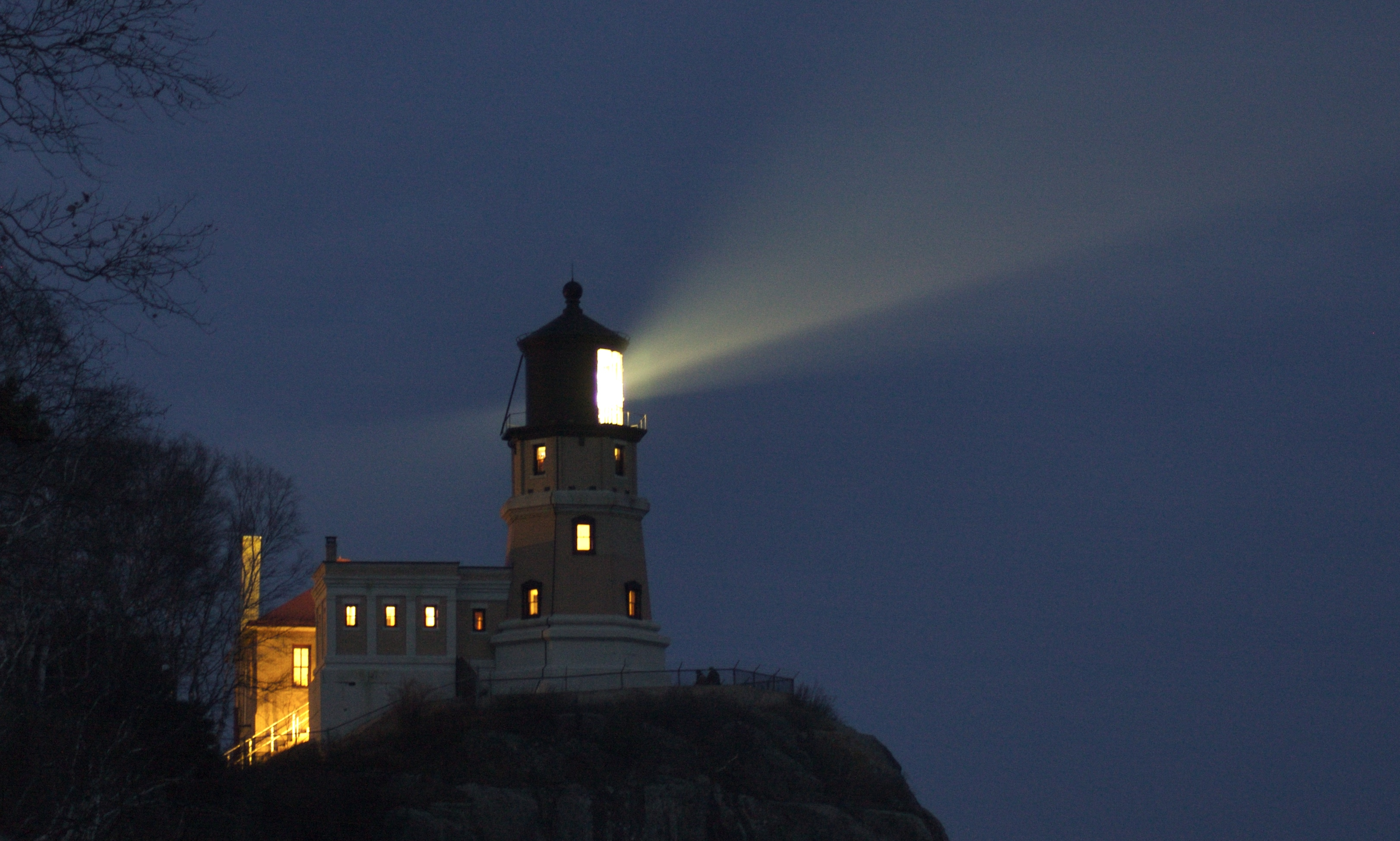
Light illuminated

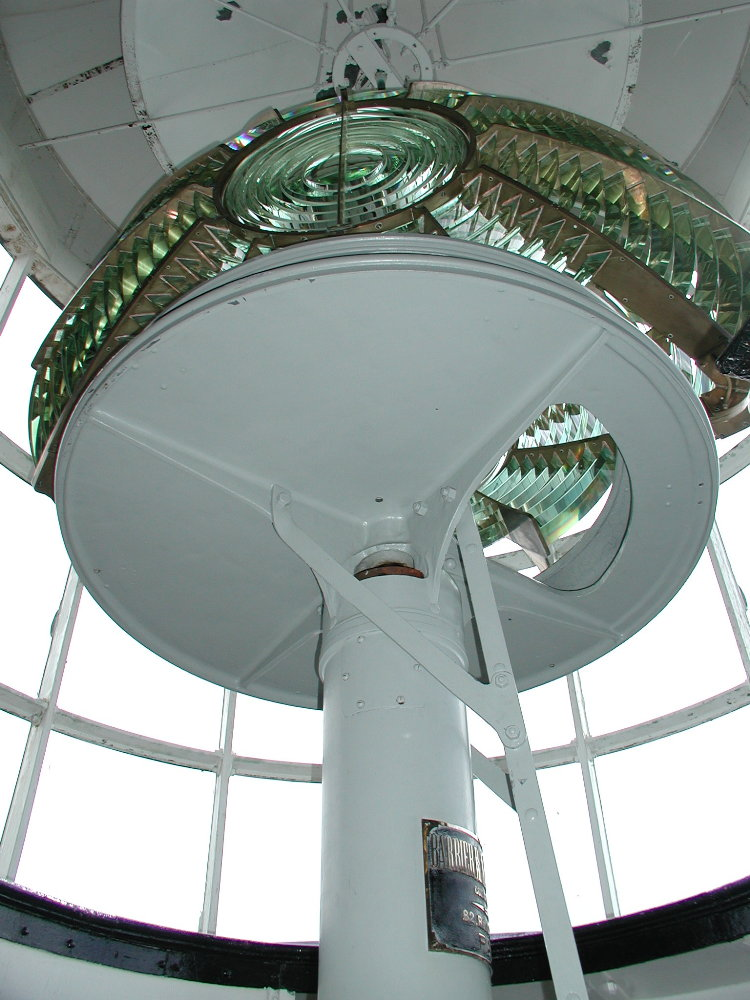
3rd-order, Fresnel lens

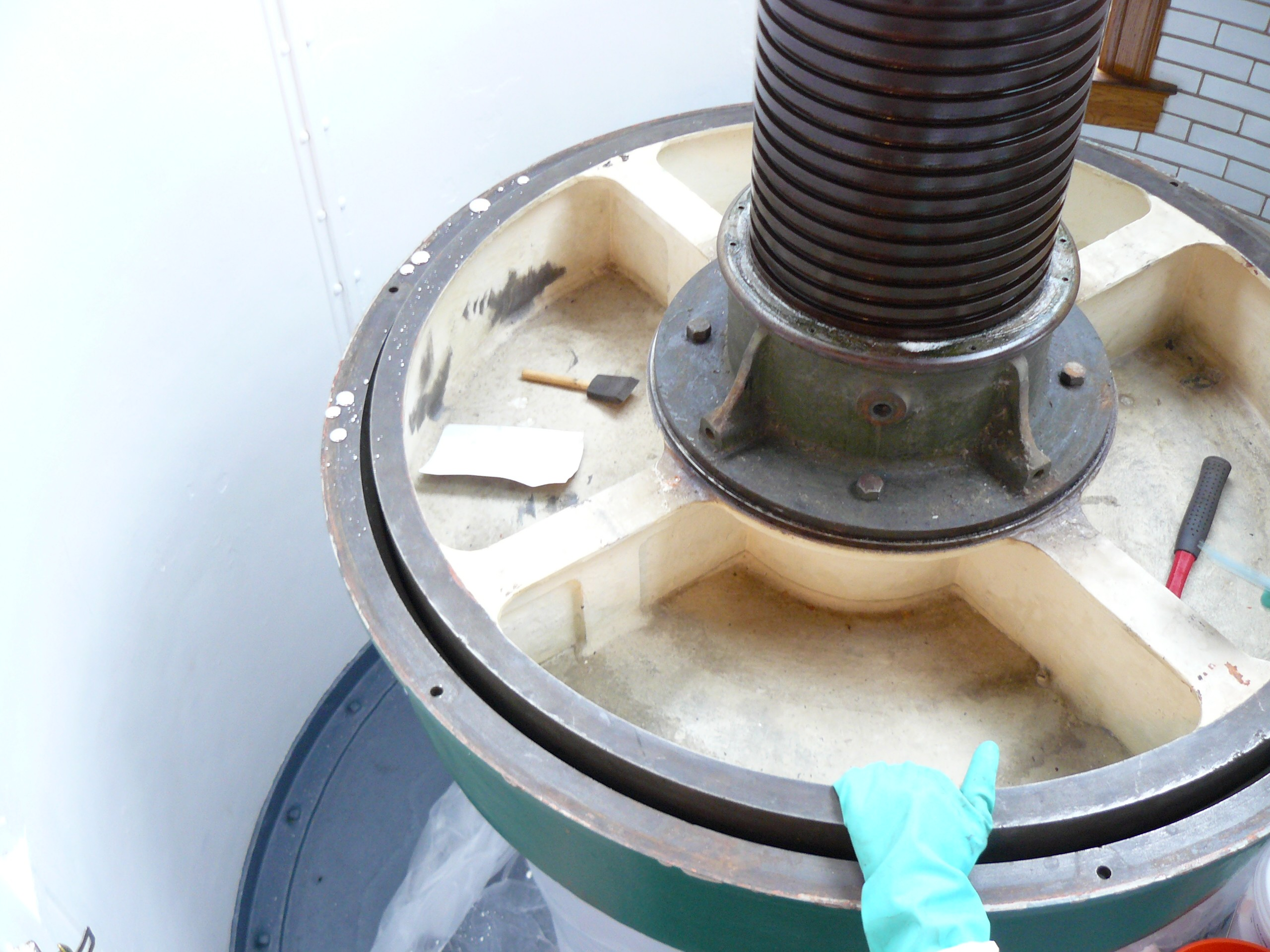
Mercury bowl and float of Fresnel lens

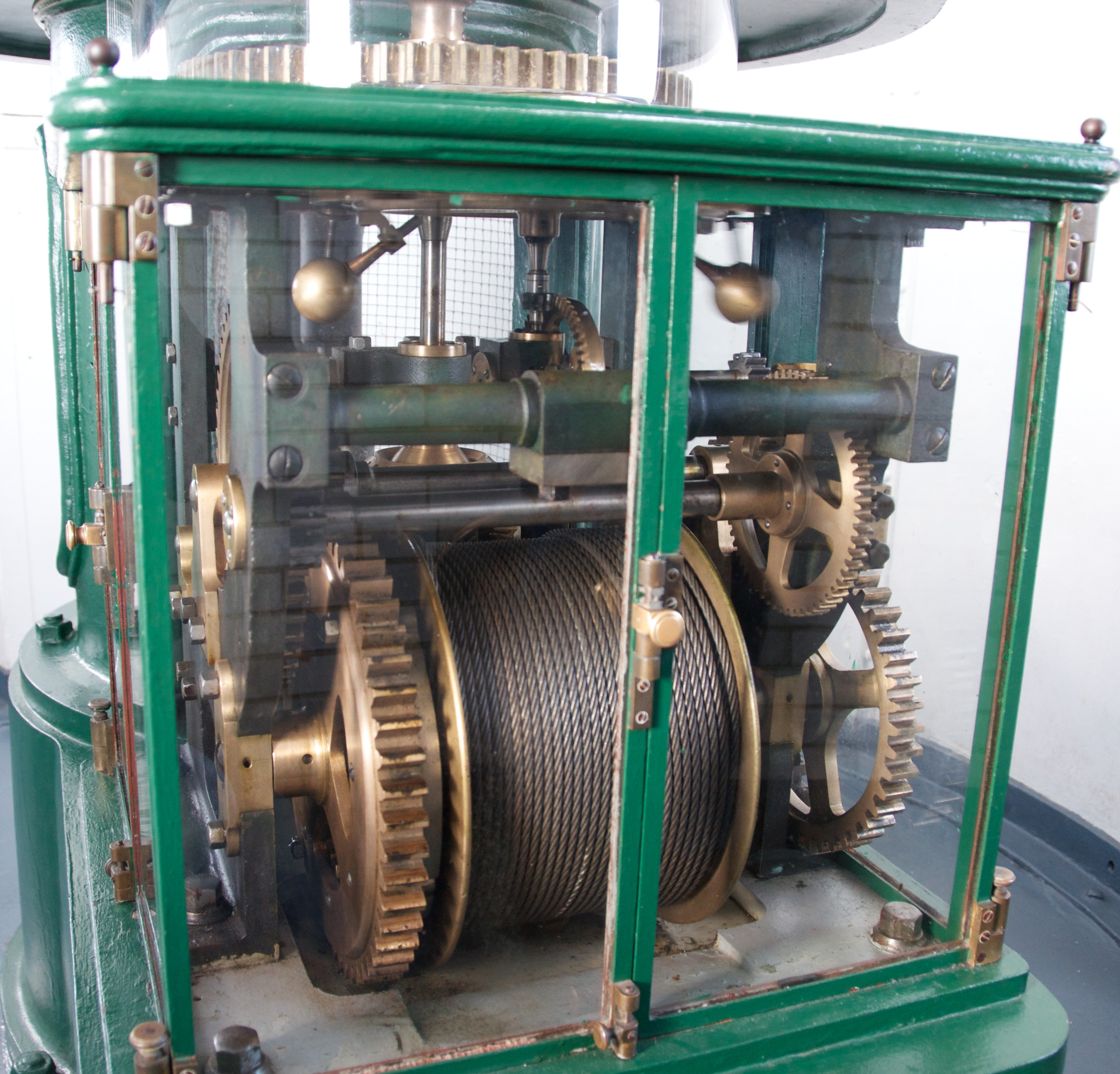
Lighthouse lens crank

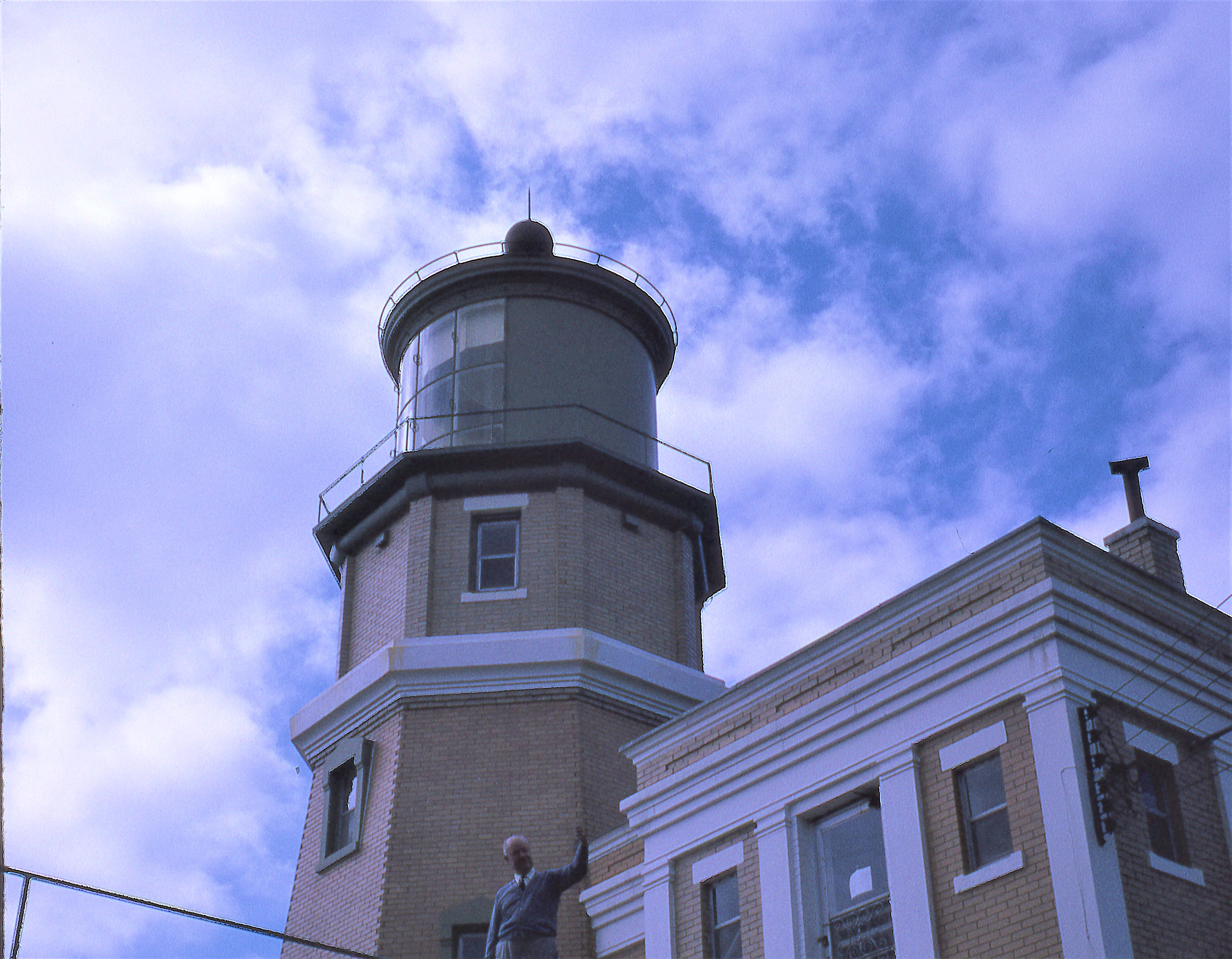
September 1968

== Records ==
Original, microfilmed, and photocopied records of the lighthouse keepers, containing daily entries on station activities and upkeep; expenditures; weather; shipping conditions; visitors; and social events on Lake Superior's north shore during the shipping season are available for research use at the Minnesota Historical Society.

== See also ==
- List of National Historic Landmarks in Minnesota
- National Register of Historic Places listings in Lake County, Minnesota
