= SS Myron =

Wooden steamship that sank in Lake Superior

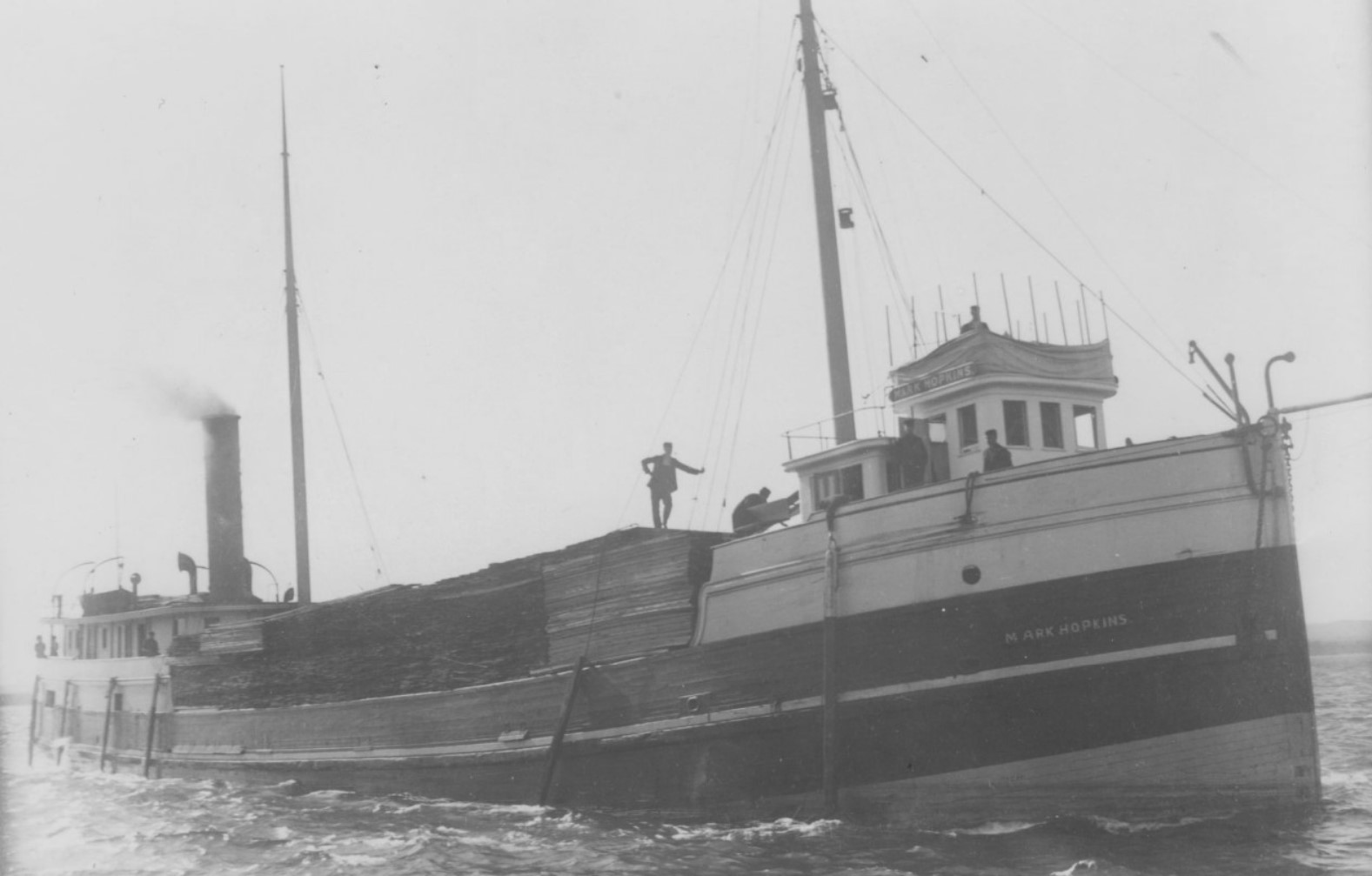
- SS Myron underway

History

United States
- Name: Myron
- Owner: Captain Harris Baker, original owner
- Operator: O.W. Blodgett Lumber Company
- Port of registry: Grand Haven, Michigan
- Builder: Mechanics Dry Dock Company
- Completed: 1888
- Identification: Official No. 91993
- Fate: Foundered 1.5 mi (2.4 km) west of Whitefish Point in Lake Superior on 23 November 1919 while her tow, schooner Miztec, survived the gale.

General characteristics
- Type: Steamer, propeller, barge
- Tonnage: 732 Gross Register Tonnage 493.7 Net Register Tonnage
- Length: 186 ft (57 m)
- Beam: 32.5 ft (9.9 m)
- Depth: 13 ft (4.0 m)
- Installed power: steam
- Propulsion: Screw
- Crew: 18
- Notes: 17 lives lost, the Captain was rescued

SS Myron was a wooden steamship built in 1888. She spent her 31-year career as lumber hooker, towing schooner barges on the Great Lakes. She sank in 1919, in a Lake Superior November gale. All of her 17 crew members were killed but her captain survived. He was found drifting on wreckage near Ile Parisienne. Her tow, the Miztec, survived. Myron defied the adage that Lake Superior "seldom gives up her dead" when all 17 crewmembers were found frozen to death wearing their life jackets. Local residents chopped eight of Myron's sailors from the ice on the shore of Whitefish Bay and buried them at the Mission Hill Cemetery in Bay Mills Township, Michigan.

Myron's steering wheel, steam whistle, and many other artifacts were illegally removed from her wreck site in the 1980s by members of the Great Lakes Shipwreck Historical Society. Her artifacts are now the property of the State of Michigan and are on display as a loan to the Great Lakes Shipwreck Museum. The wreck of Myron is protected as part of an underwater museum in the Whitefish Point Underwater Preserve.

== History ==
The 186-foot (57 m) wooden steamer Myron was built as a lumber hooker in 1888 in Grand Haven, Michigan. She was originally named Mark Hopkins for the son of Captain Harris Baker, the first of a series of owners. Her name was changed to Myron in 1902.

Myron suffered several major mishaps and rebuilds during her 31-year career on the Great Lakes. She was sunk by Vanderbilt on 27 September 1895, in Hay Lake, near Sault Ste. Marie, Michigan. She was raised 19 October 1895, and rebuilt in Marine City, Michigan in 1896. She was released after she ran ashore on Long Point on Lake Erie in 1901. She was rebuilt again from 1903-1904 in Bay City, Michigan.

Myron averaged 12 trips a year at the end of her career and she sailed under the flag of O.W. Blodgett Lumber Company, considered the last of the big lumber companies on the Great Lakes. As a lumber hooker, Myron was designed to tow one or two barges and to carry her own deck load to pay her way. She towed big, old converted schooners stripped of their masts and running gear to carry large cargoes. The schooner barge Miztec was the last of Myron's many consorts when she foundered.

== Final voyage ==
Myron departed Munising, Michigan on Lake Superior bound for Buffalo, New York shortly before dawn on 22 November 1919, towing Miztec. Both vessels were piled high with lumber. A crew of 18 was aboard Myron and 7 manned Miztec.

Two hours after departure from Munising, a severe November gale struck Myron and Miztec with northwest winds blowing 60 miles per hour (97 km/h), a rapidly dropping temperature, and heavy snow. When the pounding seas opened the wooden seams on the aged Myron, her pumps could not keep up with below deck water. Ice build up on Myron changed her center of gravity and made her unstable in the heavy seas. Her 700 horsepower (520 kW) engine could not keep up with the accumulation of water and ice until she was reduced to a speed of 3 to 4 knots (6 to 7 km/h; 3 to 5 mph). Captain Walter Neal, of Myron, decided to drop Miztec off near Vermilion Point before he attempted to fight their way to the shelter of Whitefish Bay. The battered Miztec dropped her anchors, swung her bow to the seas, and survived the storm.

When the larger, steel steamer Adriatic came upon the struggling Myron, she ran alongside Myron and provided shelter from the smashing waves in the long battle to reach Whitefish Bay. The lookout at the Vermilion Life-saving Station gave the alert when he spotted the laboring Myron shadowed by Adriatic. Captain McGaw and his Vermilion crew launched their motor powered surf boat in the raging surf and followed Myron.

Myron came to within 1.5 miles (2.4 km) of Whitefish Point when the rising water below deck extinguished her boiler fires. She slipped into a deadly trough and sank to the bottom of Lake Superior within 4 minutes. Although her crew launched her 2 lifeboats, they were trapped by the surrounding sea boiling with wreckage and lumber. The pilothouse of Myron blew off as she sank with Captain Neal still inside. He climbed out the window and clung to the roof.

== Rescue efforts ==
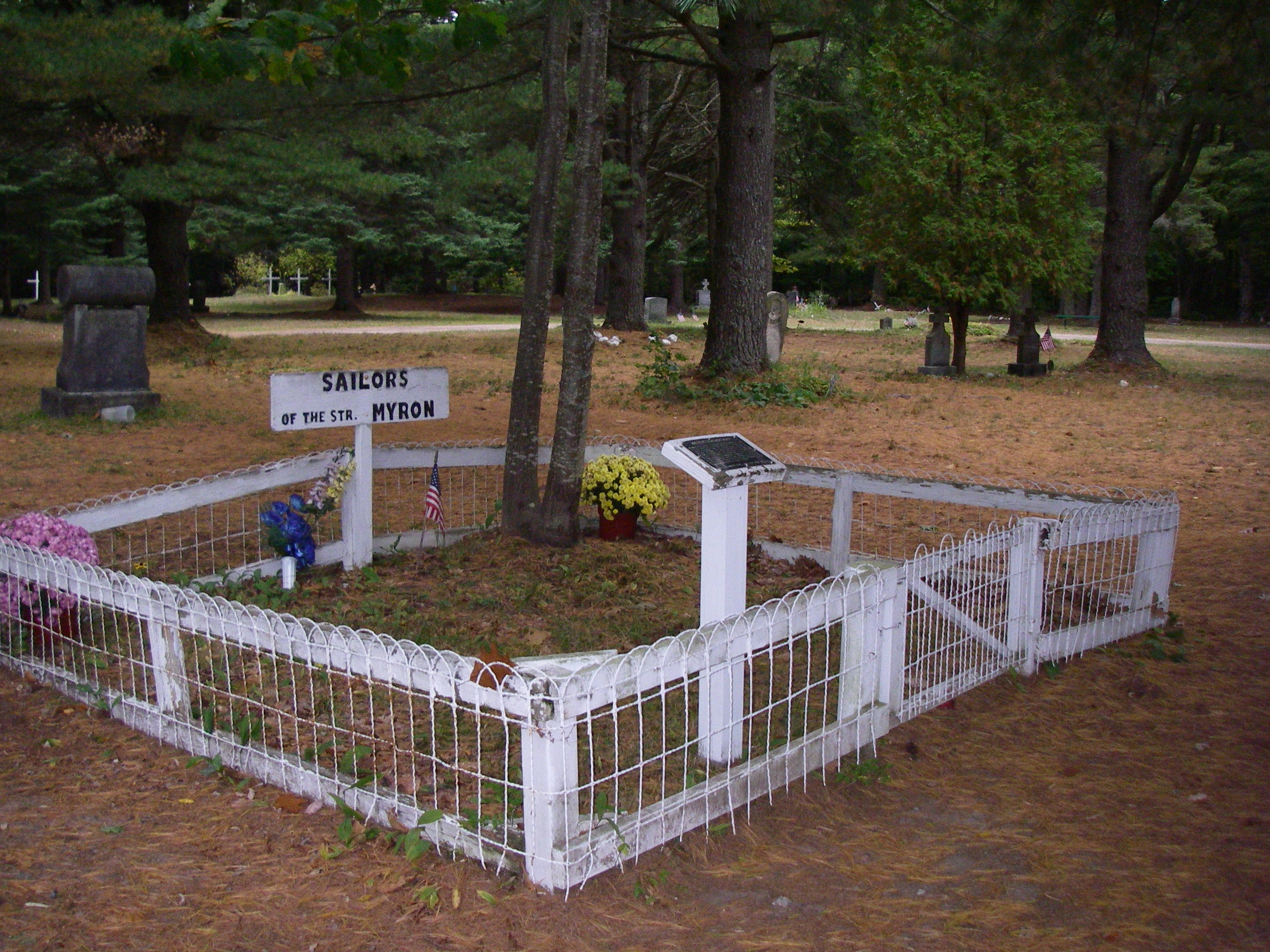
Gravesite of sailors from the S.S. Myron at Mission Hill Cemetery

Adriatic stayed with Myron to her end and twice tried to break through the mass of debris to save the castaways but was forced to pull away to avoid foundering after touching bottom with both rescue attempts.

Captain Lawrence of the 520-foot (158 m) H.P. McIntosh decided to try rescuing Myron's crew after he witnessed Adriatic's failed attempts. He forced his steel steamer through the wreckage field to come close enough to throw lines to Myron's crew but they were so numbed by the frigid temperature, they could not grasp the lines with their frozen hands. Captain Lawrence had to pull away for open water to avoid H.P. McIntosh's destruction by the mountainous waves in the shallow water.

The Vermilion lifesaving crew arrived at the wreck site after a wild trip but they could not reach Myron's crewmen without smashing their small boat in the mass of floating lumber. Captain McGaw calculated that the survivor's lifeboats would be swept down into Whitefish Bay so he rounded Whitefish Point and went 20 miles (32 km) in pitch darkness and heavy seas to Ile Parisienne but found nothing. Lighthouse keeper Robert Carlson reported that the exhausted Vermilion crew arrived at the Whitefish Point dock cut and bleeding from the beating they took by the heavy seas.

Twenty hours after Myron's sinking, Captain Jordon of the steamer W.C. Franz was upbound out of the Soo Locks and on the lookout for survivors when he sighted a body moving on wreckage near Ile Parisienne. Captain Jordon launched a lifeboat and rescued a half-dead Captain Neal from the roof of Myron's pilothouse. Captain Neal's clothing was frozen to his body and his hands were so swollen that 2 finger rings were not visible but he survived.

The rescue of Captain Neal gave hope that others from Myron survived. United States Coast Guard submarine chaser number 438 left Sault Ste. Marie with a double crew searching for survivors but was unsuccessful. Three days after the sinking, a Kingston, Ontario, newspaper cited a Lake Superior adage when it declared, "... Little hope is held out, however that Myron bodies would wash ashore, unless lashed to wreckage, as the cold lake waters prevent forming of gases, and, it is claimed bodies seldom rise to the surface. It is traditional that 'Lake Superior seldom gives up her dead.'"

All 17 crewmen of Myron drowned or froze to death in Whitefish Bay. All were recovered wearing life jackets and covered with ice. A tug owned by Frank Weston found a boat load of frozen crewmen in Whitefish Bay several days after the sinking. Some crewmen were frozen into grotesque shapes that had to be thawed out next to a roaring fire at a Sault Ste. Marie funeral home. The bodies of five of the crewman were found encased in ice near Whitefish Point in November 1919, but further search for the lost crew was hampered by a heavy snow and sleet storm. Local residents found eight bodies of Myron's crew frozen in the ice near Salt Point on Whitefish Bay the next spring. Dave Parrish and Jay Johnston chopped the sailors from the ice and Simon Johnston buried them in rough boxes made at Evans mill. The sailors rest at the pine covered Mission Hill Cemetery in Bay Mills Township, Michigan overlooking Iroquois Point and Whitefish Bay. Their graves are enclosed by a white fence with a signboard "Sailors of the Steamer Myron" attached to it.

A large stern section of Myron washed ashore on the Canadian side of Whitefish Bay. All the lumber on the two vessels was lost. Myron carried 700,000 board feet (1,700 m^{3}) of lumber and Miztec carried 1,050,000 board feet (2,500 m^{3}) of lumber. The lumber washed ashore for days west of Whitefish Point and in Whitefish Bay, enough lumber to build two small towns. The 31-year-old Myron was valued at $45,000.

== Criminal charges ==
In press interviews, Myron's Captain Neal leveled criminal charges against the captains of Adriatic and H.P. McIntosh that prompted an investigation of many months by United States marine inspectors. At a special Steamboat Inspection Service hearing, Captain Neal stated:

I was clinging to the roof of the pilothouse when the McIntosh hailed me shortly after the Myron went down from under me. The McIntosh drew alongside me, not more than 16 feet (4.9 m) away. Although it was dusk, the ship was so close that I had no difficulty in making out her name. I talked to the captain and expected that he would put out a yawl and pick me up. He did not do so, nor attempt in any way to help me. 'I will have a boat sent for you,' the captain of the McIntosh called. And he drew away. I have never seen him since, nor do I ever want to see him by the great hokey, pokey.

The Steamboat Inspection Service revoked the licenses of the masters of Adriatic and H.P. McIntosh for life. The marine community considered the verdict a gross injustice against the masters who risked their lives, their crews, and their vessels in efforts to rescue Myron in the treacherous shallows off Whitefish Point. It is probable that the verdict was reversed but there are no available records to confirm this.

== Wreck history ==
John Steele and Tom Farnquist (executive director of the Great Lakes Shipwreck Historical Society (GLSHS)) discovered Myron's wreck in 1972, in 45 to 50 feet (14 to 15 m) of water, about 1.5 miles (2.4 km) from Whitefish Point, at 46°48.463′N 85°01.646′W Steel and Farnquist salvaged the anchor from Myron and donated it to the Museum Ship Valley Camp in Sault Ste. Marie, Michigan. The GLSHS later positively identified the wreck in 1982, when they salvaged the builder's plate and other artifacts from Myron for display in the Great Lakes Shipwreck Museum at Whitefish Point. Michigan's Antiquities Act of 1980 prohibited the removal of artifacts from shipwrecks on the Great Lakes bottomlands. The Evening News reported a Michigan Department of Natural Resources and Environment 1992 raid on the Great Lakes Shipwreck Museum and its offices that found evidence of 150 artifacts illegally removed from the state-claimed bottomlands, including artifacts from Myron. Following a settlement agreement with the GLSHS, an axe, double sheave block, signs, a valve, steering wheel, steam whistle, lumber hook, open-end wrenches, a soup bowl, an oiler, and a block pulley from Myron are now the property of the State of Michigan. Myron's artifacts are on loan to the GLSHS for display in the Great Lakes Shipwreck Museum.

Myron's remains are shattered by surf and ice but she is a popular site for scuba divers. Her bow sits upright draped with anchor chains. A large windlass lies just off her bow. The boiler and engine sit off her port side, a metal capstan is on the stern, most of her midsection is disintegrated, the keel is mostly buried, and the enormous, four-bladed propeller sits upright.

Myron's wreck site is protected for future generations of scuba divers by the Whitefish Point Underwater Preserve as part of an underwater museum. Divers who visit the wreck sites are expected to observe preservation laws and "take nothing but pictures and leave nothing but bubbles". Great Lakes diver Harrington cautions that "divers must be certain of their abilities and equipment" when diving the Whitefish Point Underwater Preserve. Miztec sank in 1921, and came to rest near her longtime companion, Myron, to be together forever.

== See also ==
- Graveyard of the Great Lakes
