= Lumber hooker =

Type of ship

Lumber hooker is a nautical term for a Great Lakes ship designed to carry her own deck load of lumber and to tow one or two barges. The barges were schooner barges: large old schooners stripped of their masts and running gear to carry large cargoes of lumber.

== See also ==
- Consort (nautical)
- Orin W. Angwall
- SS Myron
