= Bannockburn (disambiguation) =

For the famous 14th century battle in Scottish history, see Battle of Bannockburn.

There are several places called Bannockburn. All are probably named after the original village of Bannockburn near Stirling, Scotland, and were created by settlers from the Scottish diaspora of the 18th and 19th centuries.

== Australia ==
- Bannockburn, a suburb of Logan City, in Queensland
- Bannockburn, a locality near Inverell, in New South Wales
- Bannockburn, Victoria

== Canada ==
- Bannockburn, Ontario, a community and former goldmine

== New Zealand ==
- Bannockburn, New Zealand, a township and former goldmine

== United States ==
- Bannockburn, Illinois, a village in Lake County
- Bannockburn, a subdivision in southern Austin, Texas
- Bannockburn, Maryland, a neighborhood of Bethesda, Maryland

== Zimbabwe ==
- Bannockburn, Zimbabwe, a small town

See also:

- Bannock Burn, a body of water near Bannockburn, Scotland
- SS Bannockburn, a steamship that vanished on Lake Superior in 1902 and subsequently gained a reputation as a ghost ship.
