= Miztec (schooner barge) =

Schooner barge sunk in Lake Superior

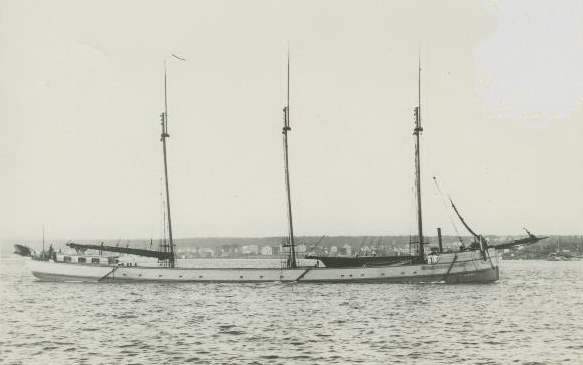
- The schooner Miztec before she was converted to a barge

History

United States
- Name: Miztec
- Owner: Marine Transit Co. (original owner)
- Operator: O.W. Blodgett Lumber Company
- Port of registry: Port Huron, Michigan
- Builder: H. Ihnken & P. Lester
- Completed: 1890
- Identification: Official No. US92166
- Fate: Foundered on May 13, 1921 off Vermilion Point on Lake Superior when in tow of the propeller Zillah.

General characteristics
- Type: Schooner; later converted to schooner barge
- Tonnage: 777.10 GRT; 738.50 NRT
- Length: 194 ft (59 m)
- Beam: 34.5 ft (10.5 m)
- Depth: 14 ft (4.3 m)
- Installed power: Sail, later towed
- Crew: 7

Miztec was built as a three-masted schooner in 1890. She was later converted to a schooner barge and served as a consort for lumber hookers on the Great Lakes. She escaped destruction in a severe 1919 storm that sank her longtime companion, the SS Myron, only to sink on the traditional day of bad luck, Friday the 13th in May 1921, with the loss of all hands. She came to rest on Lake Superior's bottom off Whitefish Point near the Myron.

The Miztec's wreck was illegally salvaged in the 1980s. Artifacts from the Miztec became the property of the State of Michigan after they were seized in a 1992 Michigan Department of Natural Resources and Environment (DNRE) raid on the Great Lakes Shipwreck Museum. The State allows the museum to hold a triple sheave block and hook and a double sheave block and hook from the Miztec as a loan. Her wreck is now protected by the Whitefish Point Underwater Preserve as part of an underwater museum.

== Career ==
The 194-foot (59 m) wooden Miztec was built as a three-masted schooner in 1890 in Marine City, Michigan. She was enrolled at Port Huron, Michigan on 8 April 1890. On 3 May 1890 she ran ashore near Minorville, Wisconsin.

The Miztec spent the final years of her career as an O.W. Blodgett Lumber Company barge consort towed by lumber hookers. She was stranded by her tow, the SS Myron, off Vermilion Point in a severe November gale in 1919. She narrowly escaped total destruction and suffered heavy damage but survived the storm while the Myron did not. She was rebuilt in 1919.

== Final voyage ==
The Blodgett fleet of the Zillah, Miztec, and Peshtigo locked through the Soo headed for a spring gale and the Miztec's doom on Friday 13 May 1921. The wooden steamer Zillah was towing the schooner barges Miztec and Peshtigo. The Zillah and Miztec carried bulk salt bound for Duluth, Minnesota and the empty Peshtigo was scheduled for drop off at Munising, Michigan.

Ten miles (16 km) west of Whitefish Point, the fleet met the full brunt of the storm's heavy snow and near hurricane-force winds. The 31-year-old wooden Zillah started taking on water when her seams twisted open in the raging seas. Her 785-horsepower (585 kW) steam engine could barely maintain her bow to the seas. The master of the Zillah decided to turn around and take shelter in Whitefish Bay. The Zillah's tow line broke during the strain of the turn, stranding the Miztec and Peshtigo in the storm, and then the tow line between the two barges broke.

In an effort to reach the lee of Whitefish Point, the Peshtigo set short sails that the wind soon shredded. The Peshtigo dragged both anchors as the wind and waves forced her toward shore, and the pounding surf of the dangerous shallows. When the crew of the Vermilion Point Life-saving Station saw the Peshtigo's struggle, they launched two surfboats that were destroyed by the crashing sea. The Peshtigo's anchors finally caught hold about one-quarter mile (0.40 km) from shore and she and her crew survived the storm.

When the tow line between the Miztec and the Peshtigo broke, Captain Campbell of the Peshtigo saw the Miztecs's lights disappear with his brother on board. His brother was the Miztec's first mate. While the Miztec survived the 1919 storm that took her partner, the Myron, her run of good fortune ended when she sank with the loss of all seven crewmembers on the traditional day of bad luck, Friday the 13th. Captain Neal, who was rescued near-death clinging to the pilothouse of the Myron in 1919, was serving as the Zillah's first mate when the Miztec sank in 1921. When the freighter Renown came upon the flotsam of the Miztec's sinking site, its crew sighted a body atop the deck house, but unlike Captain Neal's rescue, the body slipped into the seas as they approached.

The Renown reported their finding to the United States Coast Guard. The Coast Guard went to the wreck scene and buoyed the Miztec's spar that was protruding from shallow water with plans to dynamite her as a navigational hazard as she lay near the shipping lane, but they were unable to relocate her when they returned. It was believed that as her salt cargo dissolved, she moved along the lake bottom to deeper water. The Miztec came to rest not far from the wreck site her longtime companion lumber hooker, the Myron.

No bodies were recovered from the Miztec's sinking site, but six days after she sank, First Nations people on Maple Island, Ontario (south of Batchawana Bay) discovered the body of Florence Pederson, the cook and the wife of the captain of the Miztec.

The Miztec was an estimated $10,000 loss to O.W. Blodgett Lumber Company.

== Wreck ==
The Miztec's wreck was discovered in 1983 by the Odyssey Foundation in 45 to 50 feet (14 to 15 m) of water at 46°48.073′N 85°04.500′W. The Michigan Department of Natural Resources and Environment (DNRE) raided the Great Lakes Shipwreck Museum at Whitefish Point in 1992 for artifacts illegally removed from the Great Lakes bottomlands. The DNRE seized around 150 artifacts from the museum, including a triple sheave block and hook and a double sheave block and hook from the Miztec. Following a settlement agreement between the Great Lakes Shipwreck Historical Society and the State of Michigan, the State's artifacts from the Miztec are on loan to the Great Lakes Shipwreck Historical Society for display in the Great Lakes Shipwreck Museum.

The Miztec's wreck is now protected by the Whitefish Point Underwater Preserve for future generations of scuba divers. The Miztec's remains are broken and scattered on the lake bottom but her anchor and chain and other gear are still present. Although the Miztec's wreck is one of the shallower wrecks, sports divers are cautioned to be certain of their abilities and equipment for dives because the preserve does not include protective bay or coves from the cold and volatile weather. Divers who visit the wreck sites are expected to observe preservation laws and "take nothing but pictures and leave nothing but bubbles."

== See also ==
- Graveyard of the Great Lakes
