= Minnedosa (schooner barge) =

Wooden Great Lakes schooner

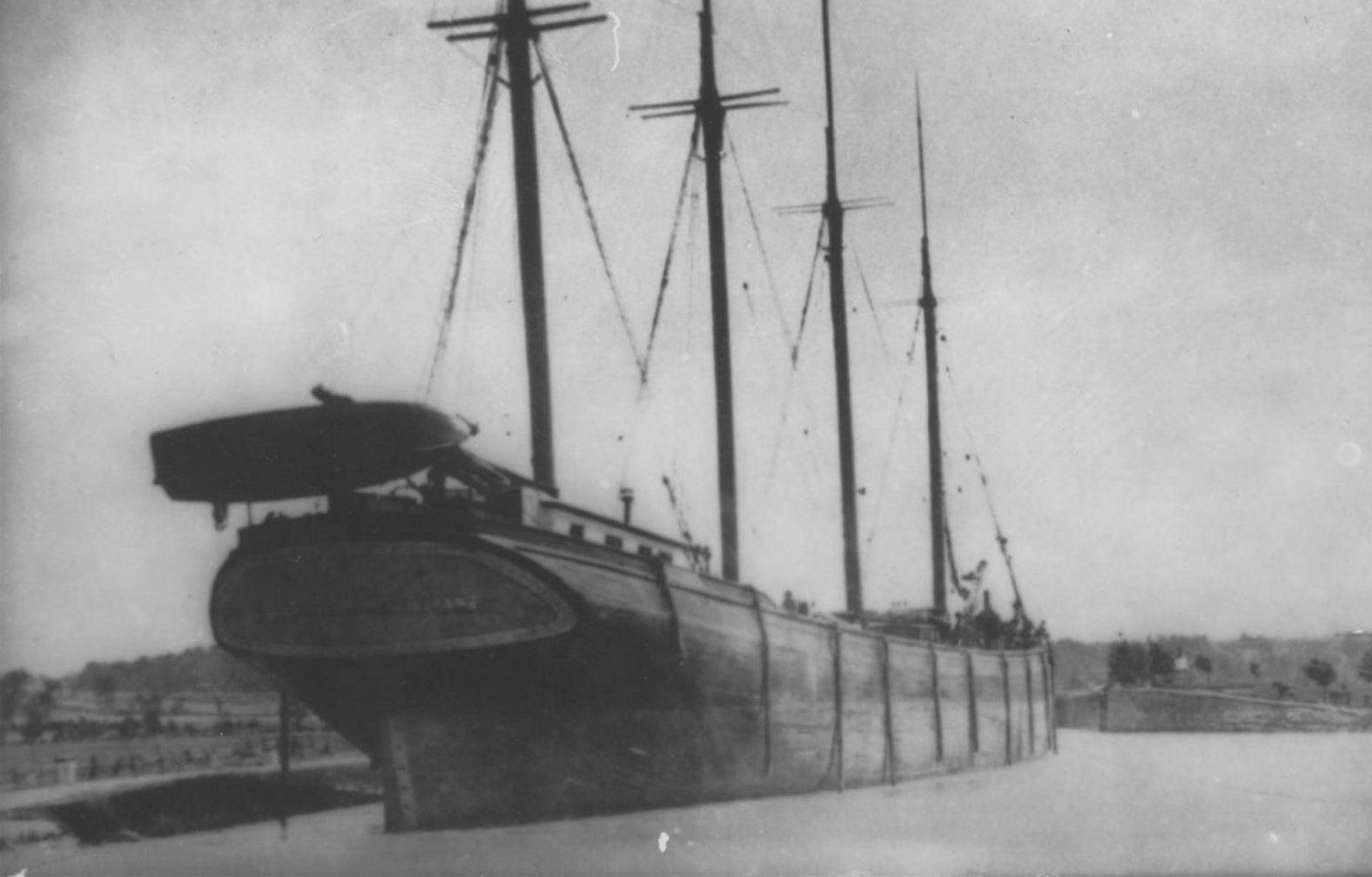
- Minnedosa before 1905

History

Canada
- Name: Minnedosa
- Owner: Montreal Transportation Company
- Port of registry: (Canada) Kingston, Ontario
- Builder: Montreal Transportation Company, Kingston
- Completed: 1890
- Out of service: 1905
- Identification: C94884
- Fate: Sank October 20, 1905, Lake Huron in tow of the Westmount.

General characteristics
- Class & type: Four masted schooner later converted to barge
- Length: 250 ft (76 m)
- Beam: 36 ft (11 m)
- Depth: 15 ft (4.6 m)
- Decks: 2
- Installed power: Sail, later towed
- Capacity: 1,041 net tons
- Crew: 12 (sail) 7 (barge)

Minnedosa was a four-masted wooden Great Lakes schooner launched in 1890. This was late in the era of sailing ships and it spent its career as a schooner barge, towed by a steam tug. It was lost with its nine crew and passengers and a heavy load of grain in a storm October 20, 1905 on Lake Huron.

== Construction and career ==
The Minnedosa was constructed by the Montreal Transportation Company and was one of 41 ships ordered for Great Lakes service. It was launched at Kingston, Ontario on April 26, 1890, and was put into commercial service two days later, April 28. At 250 feet long, 36 foot beam and 15 foot depth, it was the largest Canadian-built sailing vessel on the Great Lakes. It had a gross tonnage of 1315 and a net tonnage of 1041.

The ship spent its entire working career as a "consort barge", towed by a steamship or a tug. This practice allowed more cargo to be moved at a slight cost in lowered speed and increased manpower. Consort barges were made obsolete by larger steel freighters. The Minnedosa was mostly used to move grain across the Great Lakes to Kingston. It was often paired with the SS Bannockburn.

In 1892 while in the Welland Canal the Minnedosa was damaged when the packet freighter Arabian struck a lock. Later that year the Minnedosa's mate was injured by waves on the deck. In 1894 through 1898 the ship was towed by the steamers Algonquin, Glengarry and SS Bannockburn. In 1903 the masts were cut down, making Minnedosa a barge.

== Last voyage ==
Minnedosa took on 75,000 bushels of wheat at Fort William, Ontario on October 18, 1905. Along with the steamer Westmount and the barge Melrose, it departed across Lake Superior in tow for Kingston under the command of Captain John Phillips. The steamer was connected to the Minnedosa which in turn had a cable towing the Melrose. The three ships passed through the locks at Sault Ste. Marie early on October 19 and passed De Tour, Michigan that evening, then entered Lake Huron where a strong wind was blowing with snow falling. The captain of the Westmount, Alexander Milligan, directed the ships across Saginaw Bay. Late on the evening of October 20, the Minnedosa abruptly disappeared as the ships neared Harbor Beach. The crew aboard the barge Melrose recovered the tow cable and observed it had been cut; the Melrose was adrift.

Captain Milligan turned Westmount and began to search for the two consort barges. The Westmount's crew discovered the towing post of the Minnedosa still attached to the cable when they pulled it on board. It was later discovered that there were axe marks on the post, possibly meaning a crew of the doomed vessel chopped it off to save the Melrose. There was no trace found of the Minnedosa or its occupants, and the Melrose was taken back in tow at 5 AM October 21, making a safe arrival at Harbor Beach that afternoon.

This same storm wrecked at least eleven ships, and damaged about 12 others, on the Great Lakes that day, with loss of several crews.

The Westmount and Melrose arrived at Kingston on October 26, 1905.

Loss of the Minnedosa was attributed to its heavy load and storm damage, resulting in its taking on water. The wreckage of the Minnedosa was located in 1993, sixteen miles from Harbor Beach at a depth of 210 feet (64 m) . The deep water wreck can be inspected by properly equipped divers.

== See also ==
- Miztec (schooner barge)
- Queen of the Lakes
- Edmund Fitzgerald
- Noquebay
- Madeira (shipwreck)
- Pretoria (schooner barge)
- Moonlight (shipwreck)
- Sevona (shipwreck)
- SS Minnedosa, CPR passenger liner in Trans-Atlantic service
