= Minnedosa =

Minnedosa may refer to:

- Minnedosa, Manitoba, a community in Manitoba, Canada
- Minnedosa (electoral district), a political riding in the same area
- Minnedosa (schooner barge), a Great Lakes grain barge that sank in 1905
- SS Minnedosa, 1918 passenger ship for Canadian Pacific Railways
