= SS Bannockburn =

Steel-hulled freighter lost on Lake Superior

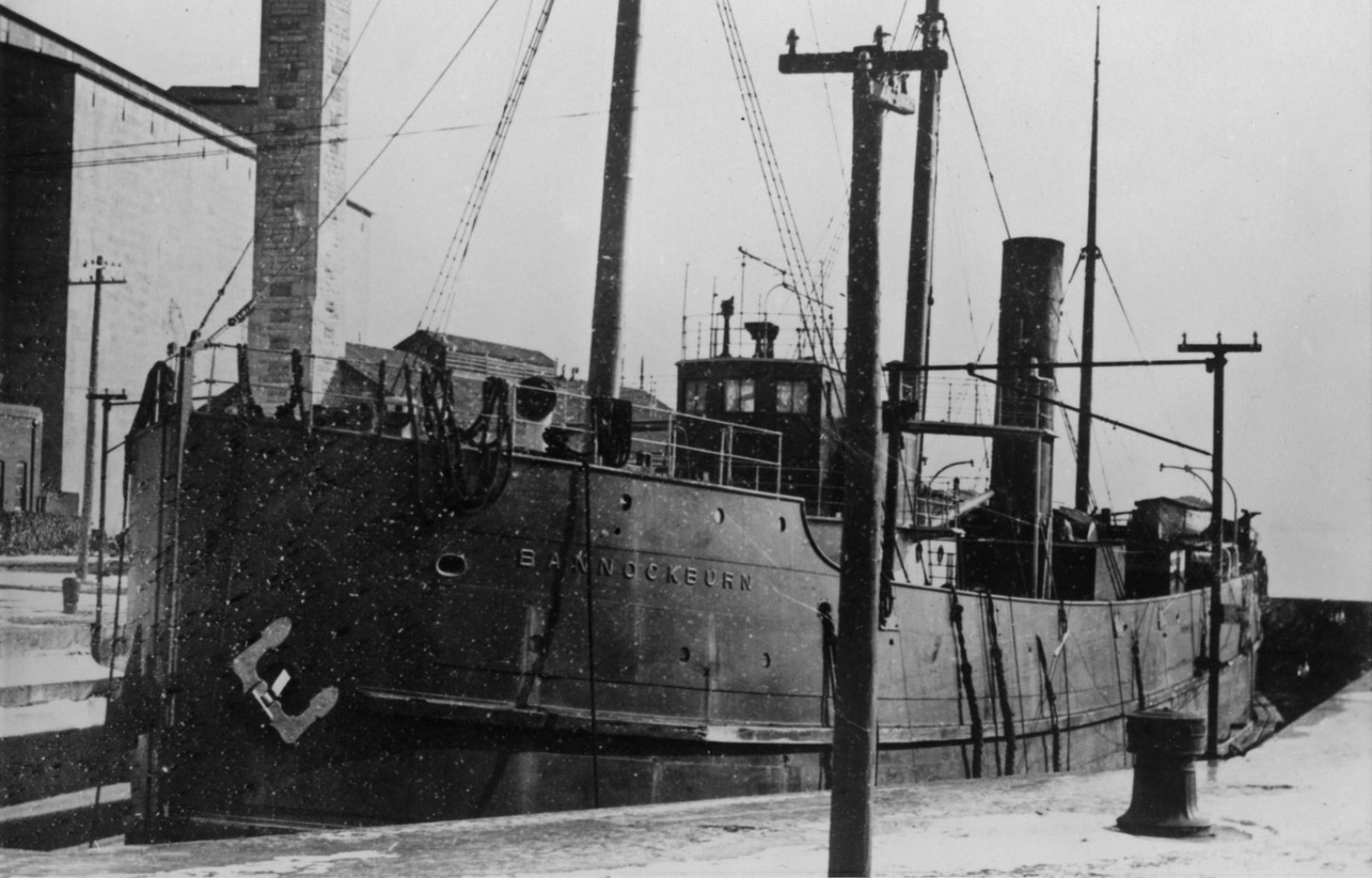
- Bannockburn in drydock in Kingston, Ontario

History

Canada
- Owner: Montreal Transportation Company of Montreal, Quebec
- Port of registry: Canada Montreal, Quebec, Canada
- Builder: Sir Raylton Dixon & Company, Middlesbrough, England
- Yard number: 386
- Launched: 1893
- Out of service: November 21, 1902
- Identification: C102093
- Fate: Lost 1902

General characteristics
- Type: Lake freighter
- Tonnage: 1,620 GRT; 1,035 NRT
- Length: 245 ft (75 m)
- Beam: 40.1 ft (12.2 m)
- Depth: 18.4 ft (5.6 m)
- Installed power: Triple expansion three cylinder engine with two boilers, machinery aft
- Propulsion: One propeller
- Crew: 20
- Notes: Often towed the four-masted schooner barge Minnedosa

The SS Bannockburn was a Canadian registered steel-hulled freighter that disappeared on Lake Superior in snowy weather on November 21, 1902. She was sighted by the captain of a passing vessel, the SS Algonquin, around noon of that day but minutes later disappeared. The wreck of the ship has never been found, with the exception of a life preserver, and no bodies were ever recovered. Within a year of her disappearance she acquired a reputation as a ghost ship and became known as "The Flying Dutchman of the Great Lakes". Her fate remains an unsolved mystery.

== History of the ship prior to sinking ==
The Bannockburn had technically sunk once before, on the morning of October 15, 1897: under Captain John Irving, laden with grain and destined for Kingston, Ontario from Chicago, Illinois, she had struck the wing wall of Lock No. 17 of Welland Canal and sprung a leak sending her to the bottom of the shallow canal where she took on nine feet of water before coming to rest. However, there were no deaths and she was raised afterward. She had also been badly damaged several months prior when she ran on the rocks near Snake Island Light on the morning of April 27 while at full speed—however, after dumping 30,000 bushels of grain cargo she was able to float and again there were no deaths, although her forefoot and frame were badly stove in.

== Chronology of disappearance ==
The final voyage of the Bannockburn began at the Canadian lakehead near what is now known as Thunder Bay, under Captain George R. Wood. She was downbound carrying 85,000 bushels of wheat, leaving the city of Fort William on November 20 and headed for Georgian Bay. She suffered a slight grounding but no apparent damage on her way out to the open lake, and her departure was delayed one day. She recommenced her journey on the 21st. Sometime that day, Captain James McMaugh of the upbound Algonquin, another lake freighter, reported viewing her through binoculars about 7 mi (11 km) to the southeast of him, about 80 mi (130 km) off Keweenaw Point and 40 mi (64 km) off Isle Royale. He was well-acquainted with her profile and he stated that he viewed her "several times" over the course of a few minutes to note her progress, which was very nearly on course. At a certain moment, however, he attempted to spot her and was surprised that he was unable to do so. He blamed this sudden disappearance on the somewhat foggy weather, and dismissed it.

A powerful winter storm raked Lake Superior that night. At 11:00 pm the nightwatch pilothouse crew of the passenger steamer Huronic, also upbound on the lake, reported seeing lights on a ship they passed in the storm which they believed were in the pattern of those of the Bannockburn. However, no signals of distress were observed, and the two ships passed each other without incident.

The Bannockburn was reported overdue the following morning at the Soo Locks, but given the weather the previous night, this was not considered unusual. When she still did not report several days later, however, the fear that she had been lost began to grow.

On November 25 the steamer Frank Rockefeller passed through a field of floating debris near Stannard Rock Light which might have been that of the Bannockburn, though at this time the Bannockburn had not yet been reported lost and the crew of the Rockefeller did not know what might have caused the debris field. By November 30, the ship and crew were officially given up as "lost".

By November 26, under pressure from the increasingly distressed families of the crew, a Mr. L.L. Henderson, a manager of the Montreal Transportation Company, claimed he had received a wire from the Chicago office of the underwriter's association which was providing insurance coverage for the ship. He told a local newspaper, The Fort Williams Times Journal, that the message read: "The steamer Bannockburn Has been located on the north shore of Lake Superior opposite Michipicoten Island. Crew safe." He later admitted he had no positive information as to her whereabouts but had based his hopeful assertion on news he had heard from the Germanic, another freighter, that she had been seen safely anchored there.

Eventually the underwriters came to the conclusion that the Bannockburn had stranded on Caribou Island. This island is surrounded by a dangerous reef, and its lighthouse had been intentionally turned off on November 15.[per Canadian government regulations] If the captain of the Bannockburn had been hoping to spot its warning light in the darkness of the storm on the 21st, the only evidence he would have had of his closing proximity would have been the shock of the hull striking the reef itself.

On Friday, December 12, the Captain of the Grand Marais Lifesaving Station found a cork life preserver from the Bannockburn washed up on the beach. This item is the only known wreckage from the ship ever to have been recovered.

Captain Wood, from Port Dalhousie, Ontario, was the oldest person aboard the vessel, at age 37. Most of the crew were between the ages of 17 and 20. His first mate, Alex Graham, was also from Port Dalhousie, Ontario. One of the ship's two wheelsmen, Arthur Callaghan, was only 16. Although the ship was considered to be of recent manufacture (at nine years old it was still thought of as almost new) the overall inexperience of her crew might have been a factor in her being lost. Such young crews, however, were common on the Great Lakes at the turn of the 20th century because they were inexpensive to hire and shipping firms had strong financial incentives and no legislative reason not to take advantage of this whenever they might.

There are many theories as to what went wrong. Captain McMaugh proposed that the ship might have experienced a boiler explosion though he did not hear one and no charred wreckage typical of such an explosion was later found anywhere along the route that the Bannockburn was known to have taken. Alternatively, the at-that-time uncharted danger of the Superior Shoal might also have been the cause. When the Soo locks were drained at the end of that season, a hull plate from a ship was found in the lock. It was supposed to have belonged to the Bannockburn, and without it her hull would have had an unknown weak point.

The only known memorial to the Bannockburn is a stone tablet in a church in Port Dalhousie, Ontario. It is in memory of her captain, and was purchased by his brother.
