= Superior Shoal =

Shoal in the middle of Lake Superior

Coordinates: 48°4′N 87°5′W

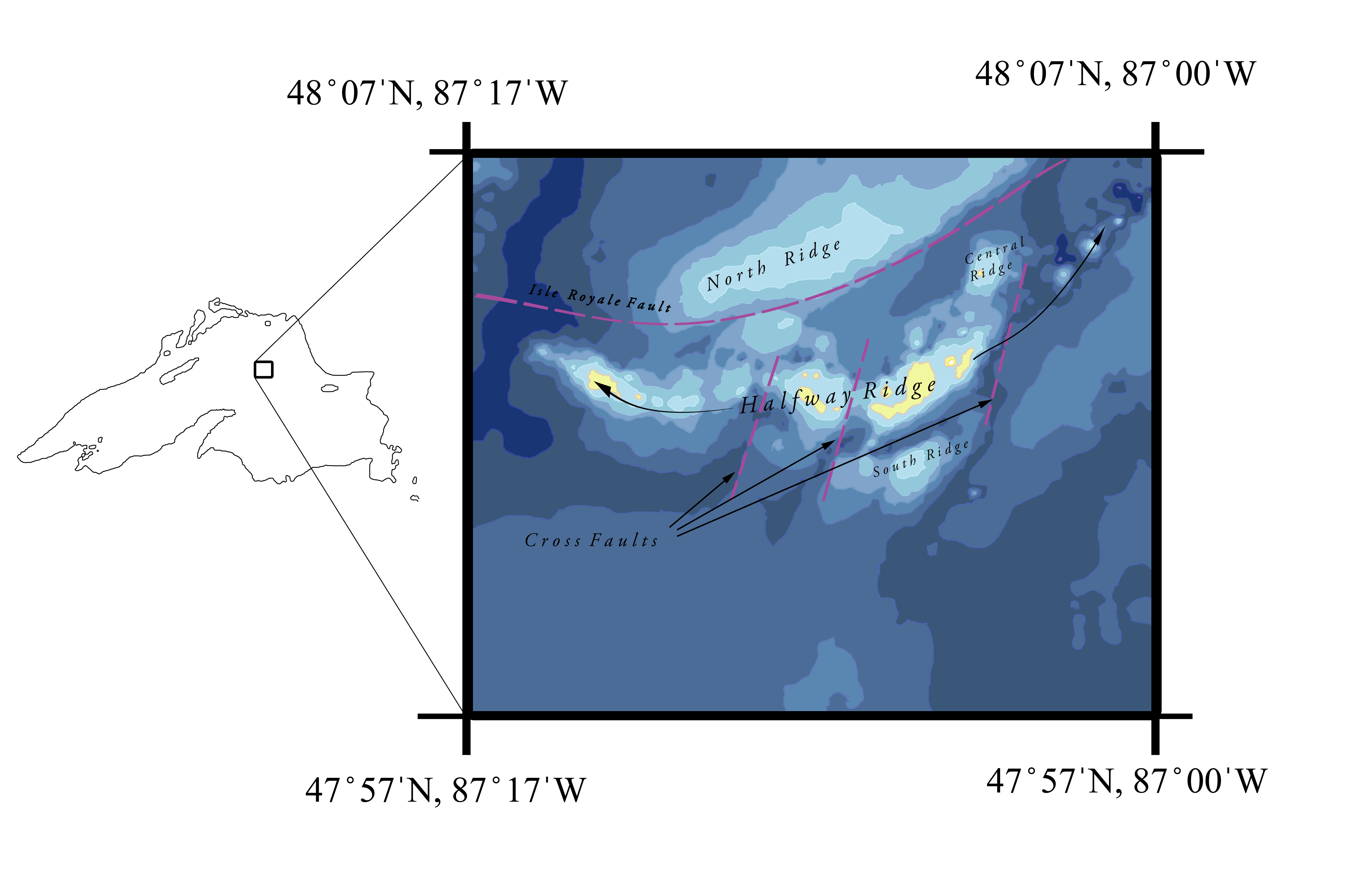
Superior Shoal's four geologic ridges. Contour interval: 20 feet.

The Superior Shoal is a geologic shoal of approximately 20 square miles (52 km^{2}) located 50 miles (80 km) north of Copper Harbor, Michigan, in the middle of Lake Superior, the highest point of which lies only 21 feet (6.4 m) below the lake's surface. The shoal is a hump of Keweenawan basaltic lava flows with ophitic interiors and amygdaloidal tops in an otherwise deep part of the lake, and though fishermen had known of its existence for generations it was only officially charted in 1929 by the United States Lake Survey. It has been theorized that the World War I French minesweepers Inkerman and Cerisoles, which disappeared during their maiden voyage on Lake Superior in mid-November 1918, may have run aground on this shoal and some have theorized that it may have been to blame for both the disappearance of the "Flying Dutchman of the Great Lakes" on November 21, 1902, and the sinking of the "Titanic of the Great Lakes" on November 10, 1975 (the SS Bannockburn and SS Edmund Fitzgerald, respectively). It is one of the known off-shore spawning and foraging habitats for the juvenile lean lake trout and home to siscowet and other fishermen-recognized species variants. The periodic lateral migrations characteristic of some inshore lake trout stocks were replaced on Superior Shoal by vertical movements up and down the sides of the ridges.

== Geology ==
The shoal consists of four geologic ridges: the north ridge, the central ridge, the halfway ridge, and the south ridge. The north ridge is a subtle but distinct rise across the northern portion of the shoal; the central ridge consists of a few high peaks in the eastern-center of the shoal; the halfway ridge is the largest ridge and stretches in an arc from east to west across the entire feature; the south ridge is made up of two associated basalt rises on the southern edge of the formation. The Isle Royale Fault creates a gorge between the north ridge and the other three ridges.

A different shoal with the same name is located just off Delf Island in Georgian Bay east of Lake Huron in Ontario.
