= International Bridge Walk =

Canadian event

Coordinates: 46.50703°N 84.36132°W

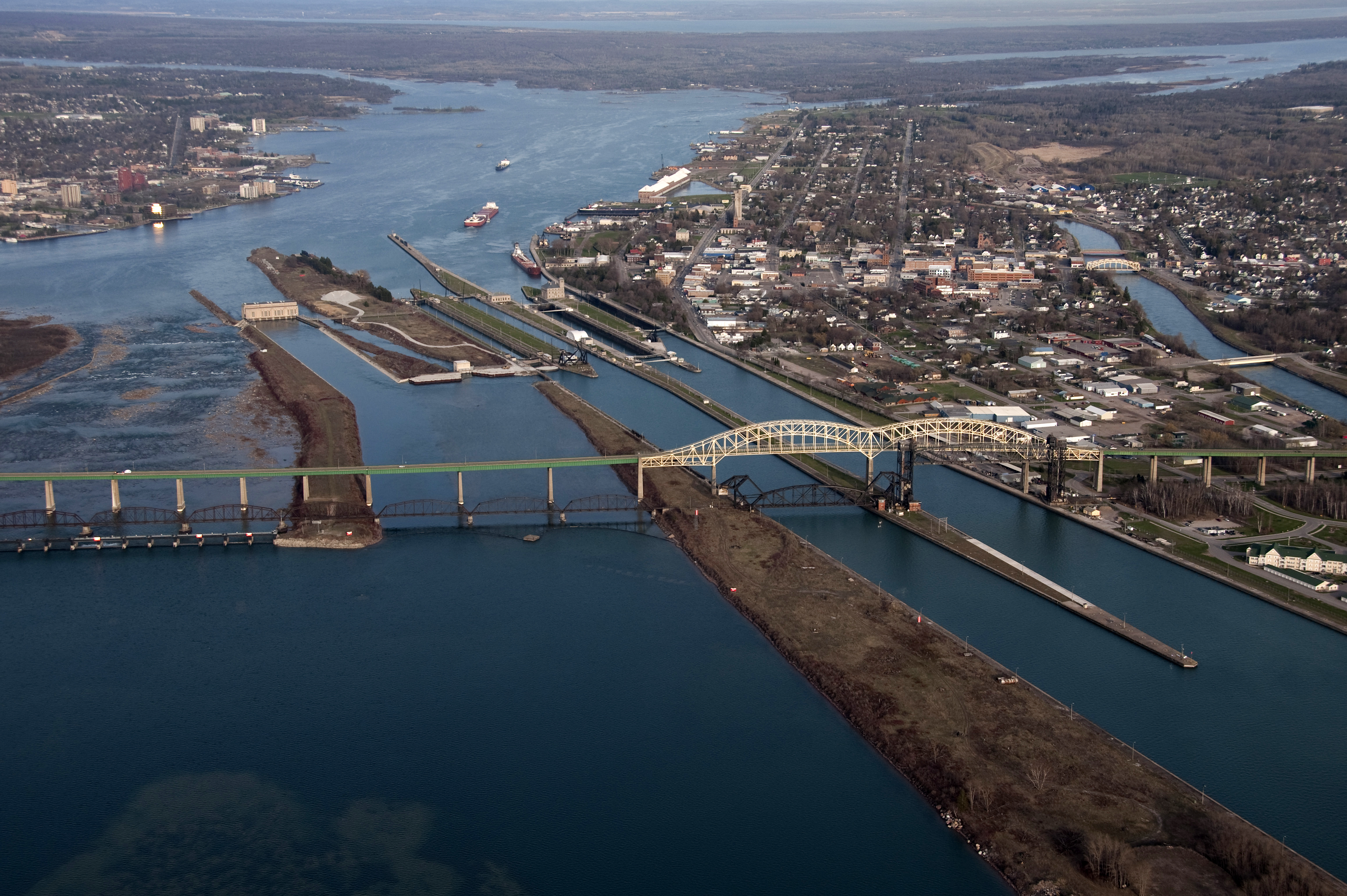
The Sault Ste. Marie International Bridge, looking east

International Bridge Walk is an annual event held on the last Saturday in June where participants can walk from Sault Ste. Marie, Michigan, to Sault Ste. Marie, Ontario, via the International Bridge. Begun in 1987, it represents the friendship between the two Saults and both countries, and is held in conjunction with Canada's national holiday, Canada Day.

The walk begins at the Norris Building parking lot of Lake Superior State University with speeches from officials of both Saults and the singing of "O Canada" and "The Star-Spangled Banner". Participants begin walking about 9:00 a.m. and proceed west on Easterday Avenue and to the on-ramp near the bridge's toll plaza and finish at the OLG Casino west parking lot in Canada. Buses are provided for U.S. citizens to return to the U.S. The walk concludes at 10:30 a.m. and no one can walk the bridge after that time. In 2012, a bicycle parade was added to the annual event to cross the bridge from 8:30 to 9:30, the walk now taking place from 9:30 to 11:00.
