= Sault Ste. Marie International Bridge =

Bridge connecting Canada and the United States

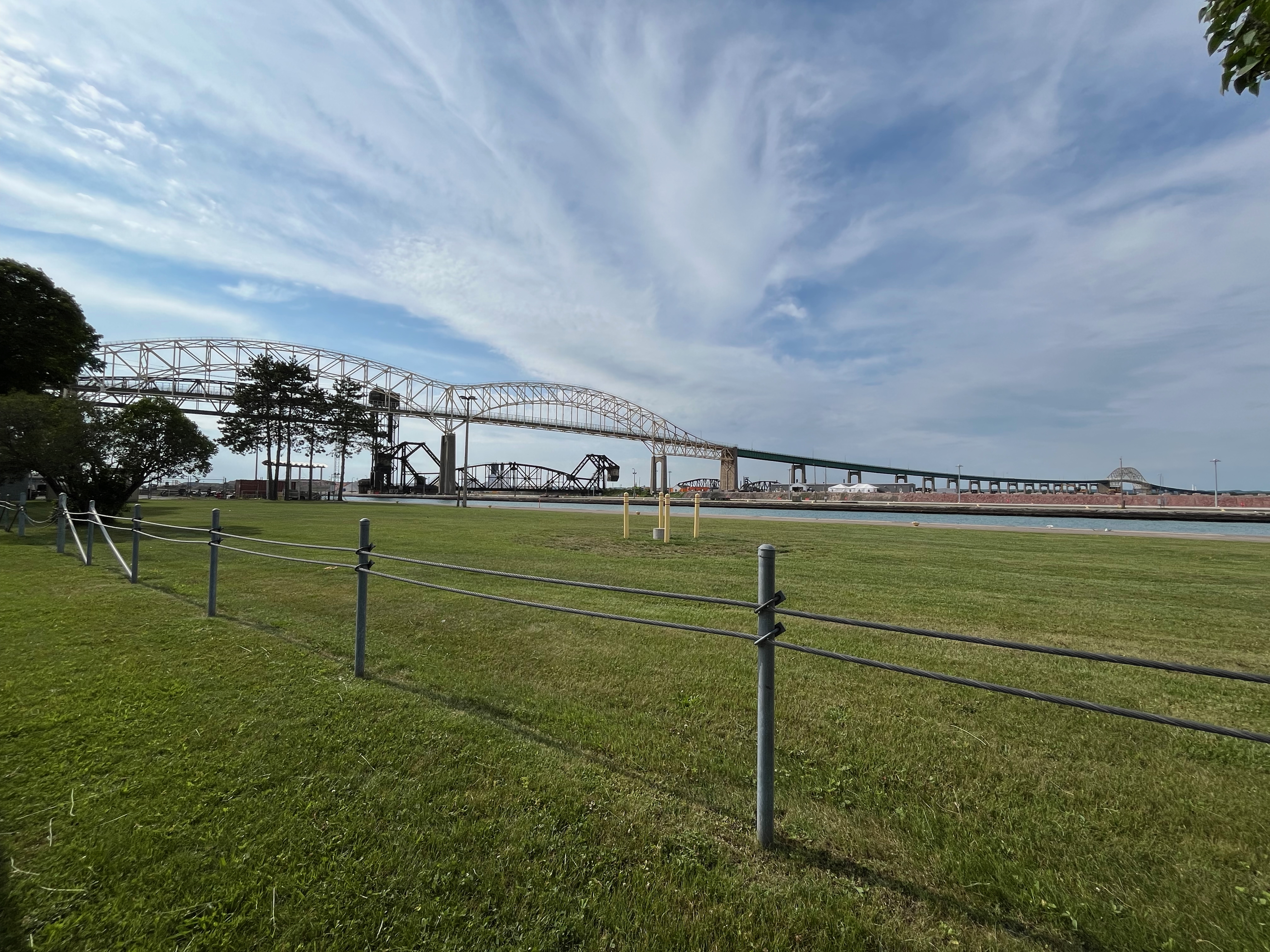
- The bridge from the American side in 2025
- Coordinates: 46.50703°N 84.36132°W
- Carries: Two lanes of traffic ( I-75 / LSCT / LHCT)
- Crosses: St. Marys River
- Locale: Sault Ste. Marie, Michigan – Sault Ste. Marie, Ontario

Characteristics
- Design: truss arch bridge
- Total length: 2.8 miles (4.5 km)
- Width: 28 feet (8.5 m)
- Longest span: 132 m
- Clearance below: 124 feet (38 m)

History
- Opened: October 31, 1962

Statistics
- Daily traffic: 7,000 vehicles daily (average), 10,000 vehicles daily (peak)
- Toll: US$4.50, C$6.30

Location
- Interactive map of Sault Ste. Marie International Bridge

The Sault Ste. Marie International Bridge spans the St. Marys River between the United States and Canada connecting the twin cities of Sault Ste. Marie, Michigan, and Sault Ste. Marie, Ontario. The bridge is operated by the International Bridge Administration under the direction of the Sault Ste. Marie Bridge Authority, a bi-national governing body consisting of four directors appointed by the governor of Michigan and four appointed by the Canadian government-owned Federal Bridge Corporation.

== Description ==
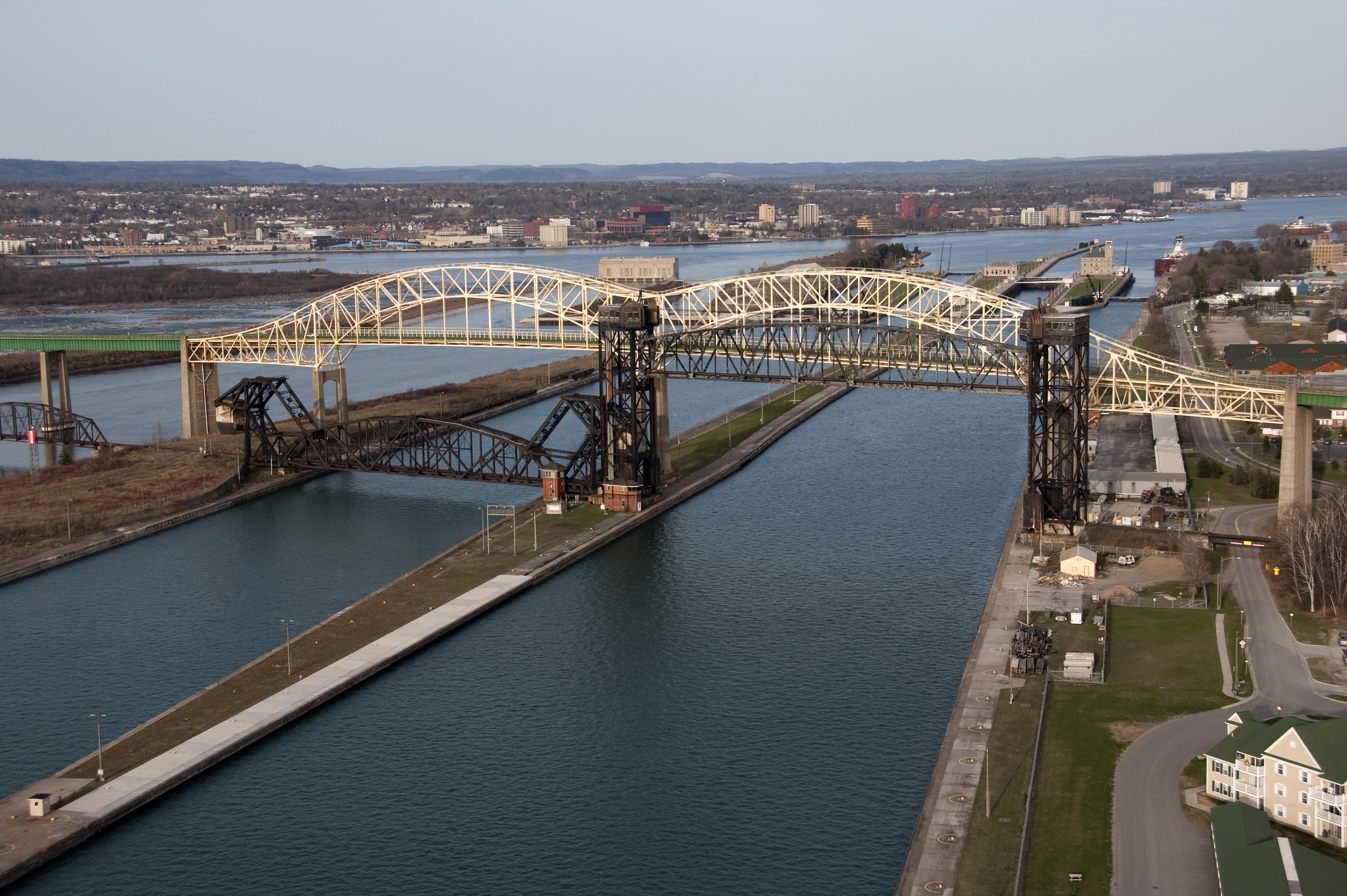
The American main span over the Soo Locks in 2010

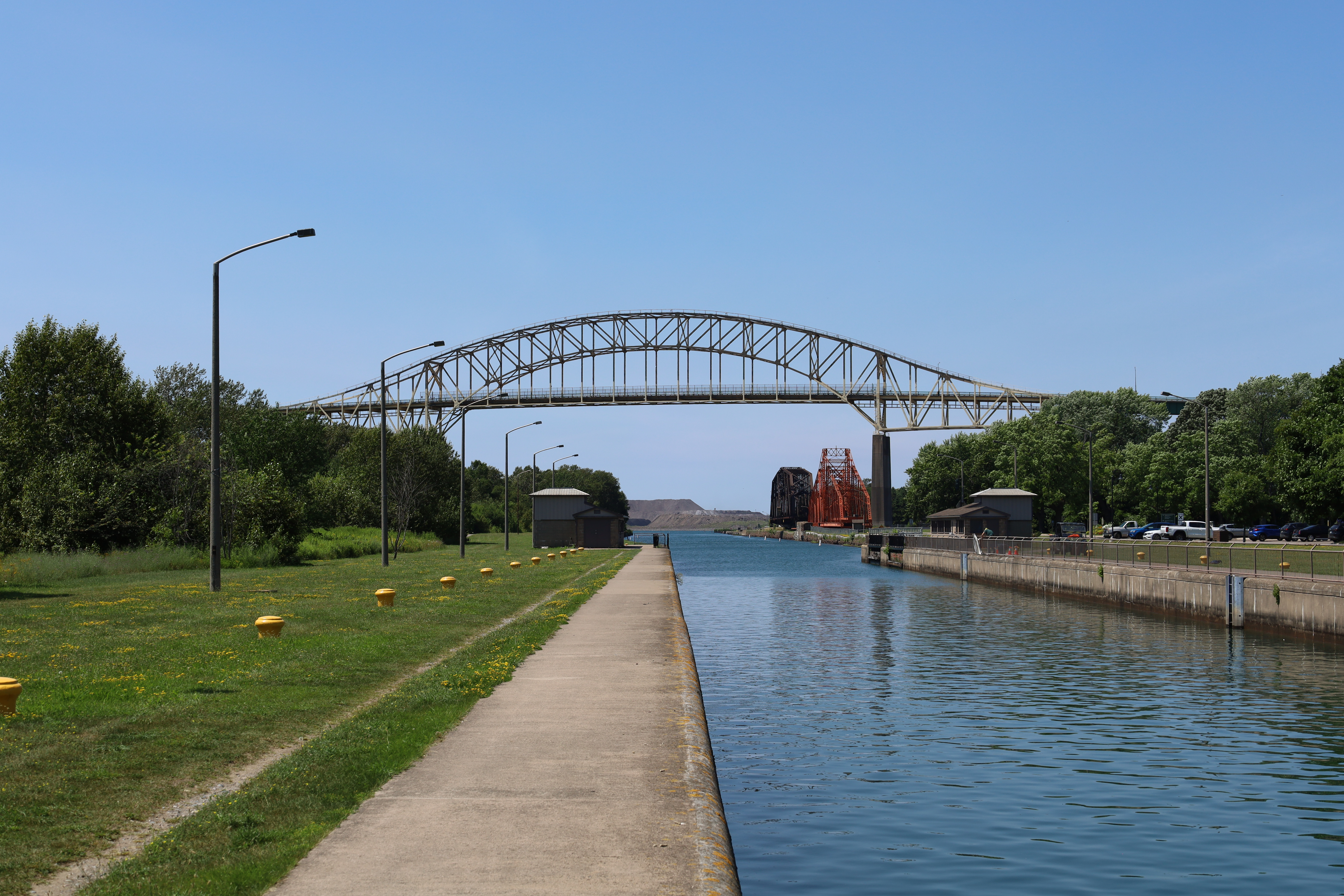
The Canadian main span over the Sault Ste. Marie Canal in 2025

This is a steel truss arch bridge with a suspended deck. There are two separate main spans: a double-arch span on the U.S. side and a single-arch span on the Canadian side, which are joined with a long causeway. The double arch spans cross the four U.S. Soo Locks. The single arch spans the single Canadian Lock. In Sault Ste. Marie, Ontario, the bridge ends at a city street, Huron Street, in the downtown core. The total length of the bridge approaches 2.8 miles (4.5 km).

The bridge serves as the northern terminus of Interstate 75 (I-75). It is also the northern end of the U.S. Bicycle Route 35.

The Sault Sainte Marie Border Crossing connects the cities of Sault Ste. Marie, Michigan and Sault Ste. Marie, Ontario at the Sault Ste. Marie International Bridge. The U.S. Port of Entry was established in 1843, as the cities on each shore of the river grew. Regular ferry service began in 1865, and border inspection services in both the US and Canada were provided at the ferry terminals since the early 1900s. Ferry service ended in 1962 when the International Bridge spanning the river was completed. Railroad trains cross the border on the adjacent Sault Ste. Marie International Railroad Bridge which was built in 1887.

The Sault Ste. Marie International Bridge is the tenth-busiest passenger crossing on the Canada–United States border as of 2015. It and the companion rail bridge are the only fixed crossings for several hundred miles in either direction, as the next crossings are the Pigeon River Bridge beyond the far end of Lake Superior, and the Blue Water Bridge beyond the far end of Lake Huron.

Daily operation is carried on by the International Bridge Administration (IBA) under the supervision of the Sault Ste. Marie Bridge Authority (SSMBA). The SSMBA replaced the previous Joint International Bridge Authority (JIBA) in 2009, which in turn had succeeded the International Bridge Authority (IBA, created in 1935) in 2000.

Both the U.S. and Canada border stations are open 24 hours per day.

== History ==
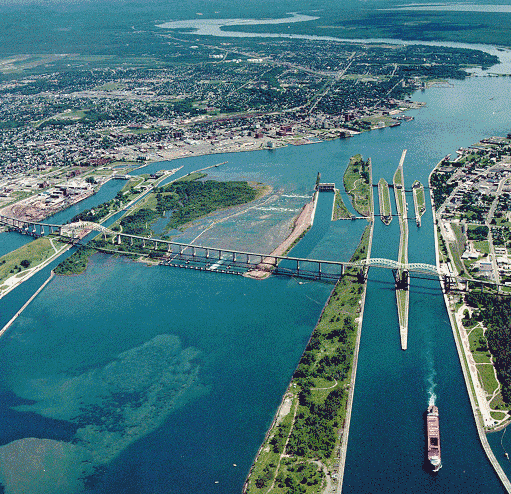
Aerial view of the bridge and the Soo Locks in 1992, with Canada at left and the U.S. at right

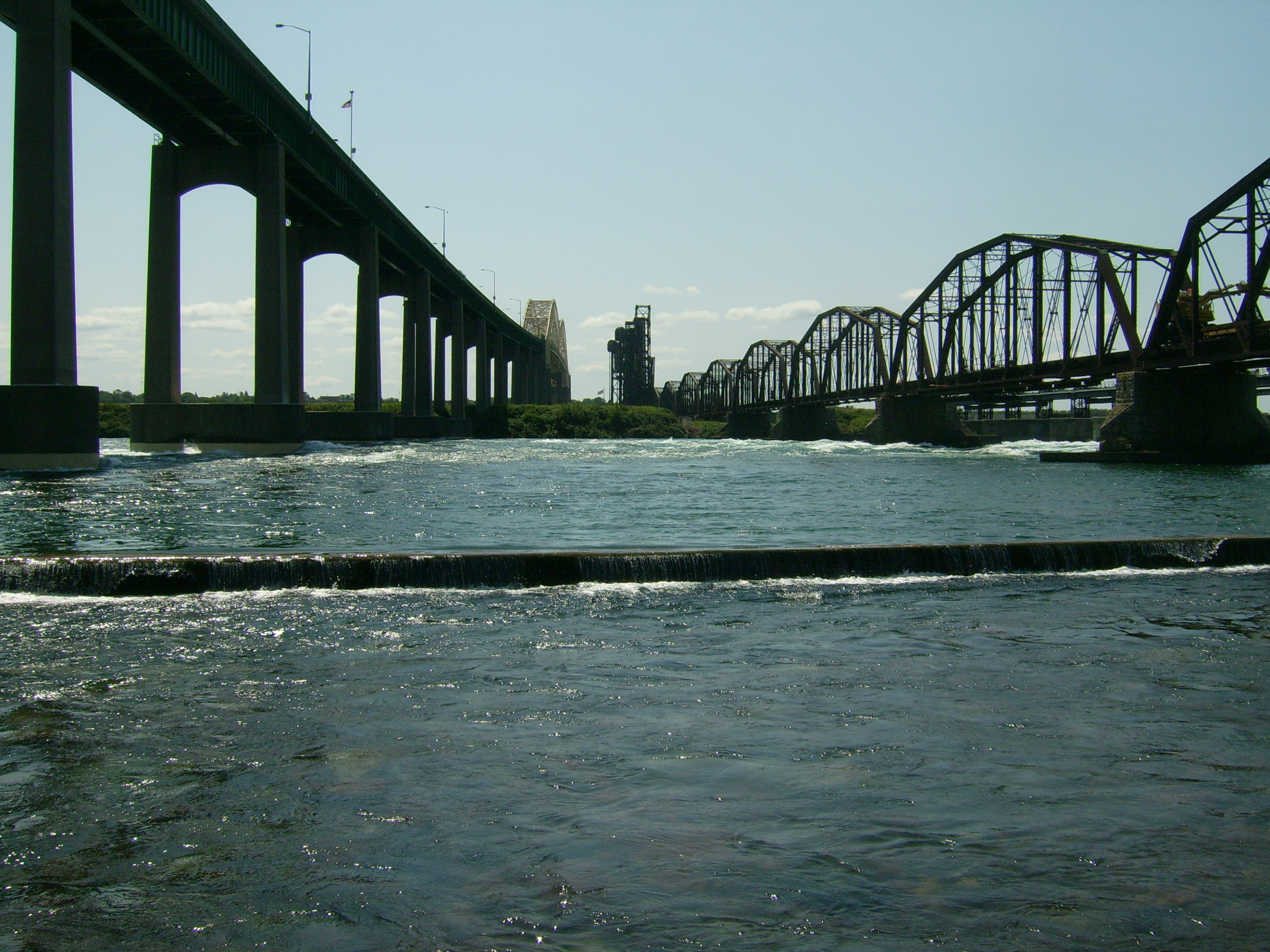
The road bridge (left) and the rail bridge (right) in 2013

In 1954 the state of Michigan created the International Bridge Authority. Canada followed in 1955, creating the St. Mary's River Co. The bridge construction began in 1960 and officially opened to traffic on October 31, 1962. Contractors included Massman Construction Co. of Kansas City, MO and Bethlehem Steel of Bethlehem, PA.

In 1975, the bridge had its 10 millionth crossing.

Beginning in 1987, an annual International Bridge Walk has been held on the last Saturday in June, starting on the Michigan side, with participants finishing in Ontario.

On June 6, 2005, the Ontario government announced a construction project to build a dedicated truck bypass route to connect the bridge to Highway 17 in the north end of the city. The city had lobbied for this for some time, since the bridge's terminus at a city street was viewed by many residents of the city as a safety concern; however, the bridge terminus itself cannot be easily relocated due to the already highly urbanized nature of the Sault, Ontario waterfront. The truck route, known as Carmen's Way in memory of the city's former federal MP Carmen Provenzano, was officially opened in September 2006.

Construction work commenced in 2009 on a project to expand and modernize the Canadian bridge plaza, including a larger Canada Border Services Agency building with improved truck inspection facilities and a dedicated route to take trucks directly to Carmen's Way, thereby eliminating the need for trucking traffic to enter Huron Street.

Beginning in May 2014, construction work began to completely rebuild the toll plaza/border crossing on the Michigan side of the bridge with an entirely new facility. This was needed to better accommodate truck traffic and meet current capacity. This was completed on October 21, 2015. The 100 millionth crossing occurred on March 1, 2018.

The International Bridge Bus was operated by the CLM Community Action Agency (CLMCAA) of Sault Ste Marie, Michigan. Bridge bus border crossings by CLMCAA ceased in March 2020, at the start of the COVID-19 border restrictions between Canada and the U.S. Prior to the COVID-19 pandemic, the bridge bus crossed hourly from 8:00 am to 4:00 pm on weekdays serving both downtown areas and Lake Superior State University on the Michigan side and the Station Mall on the Ontario side.

== Gallery ==
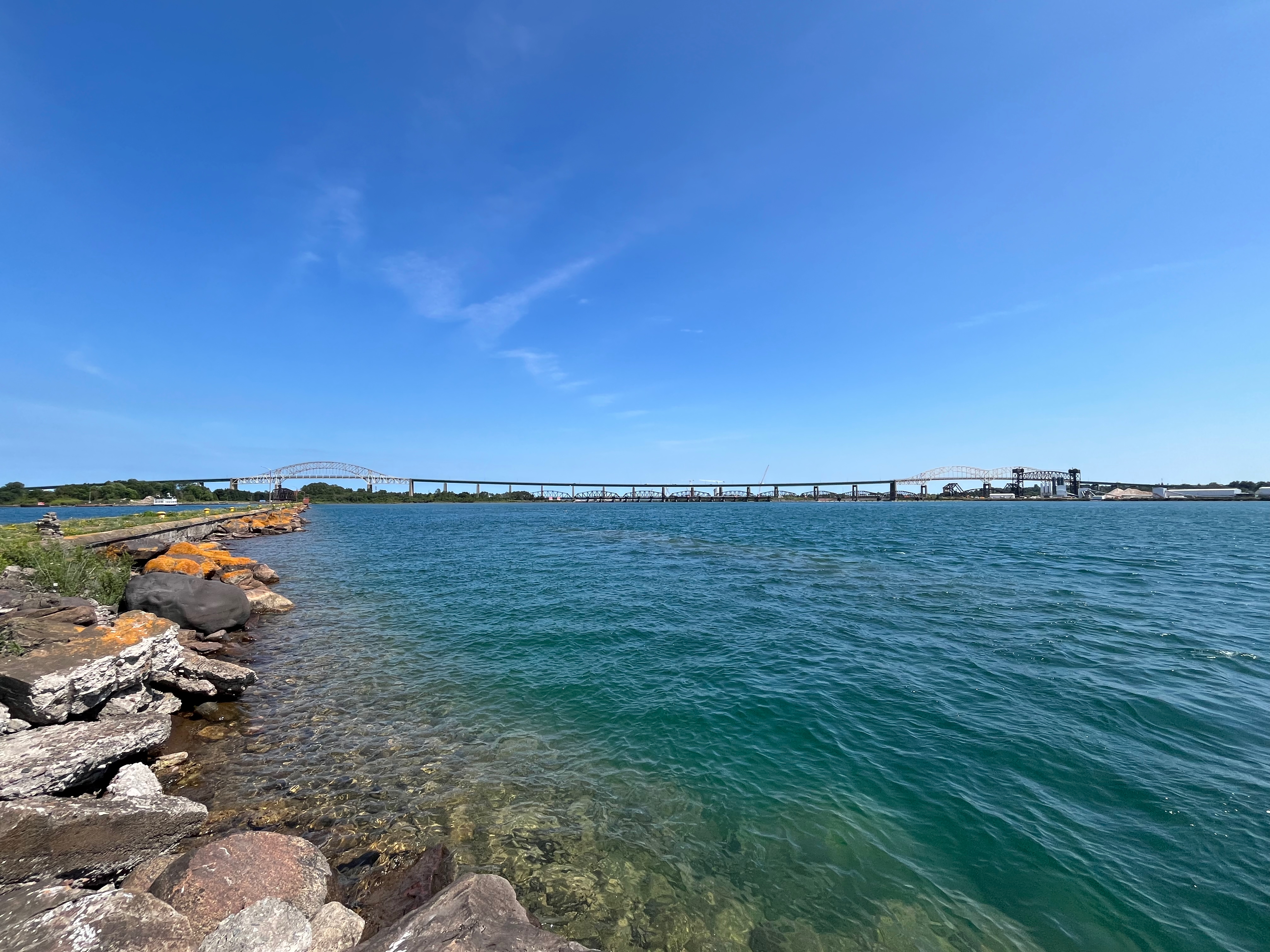
The bridge viewed from the end of the West Pier in 2025

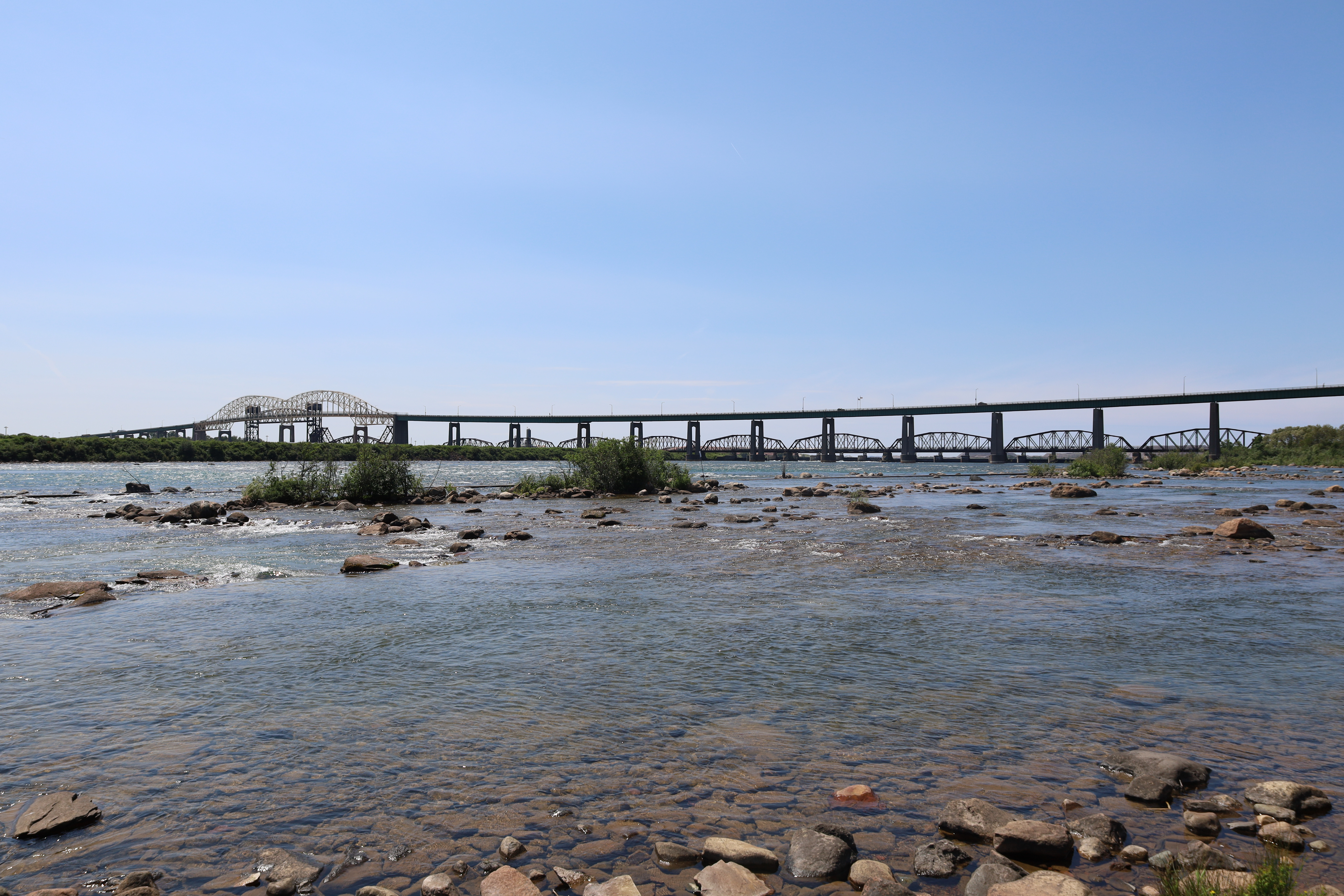
The bridge viewed from Whitefish Island in 2025

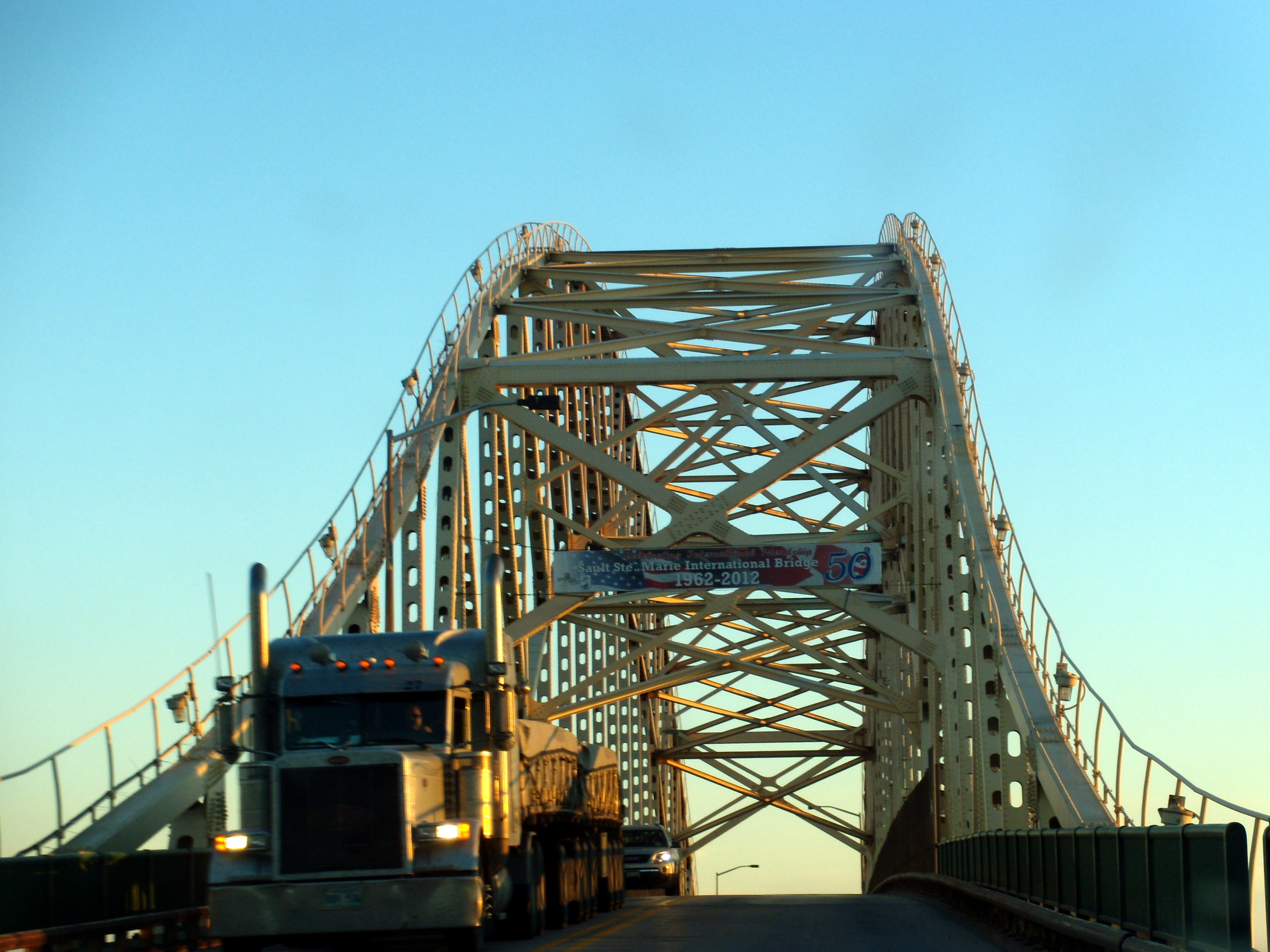
Deck of the bridge in 2013

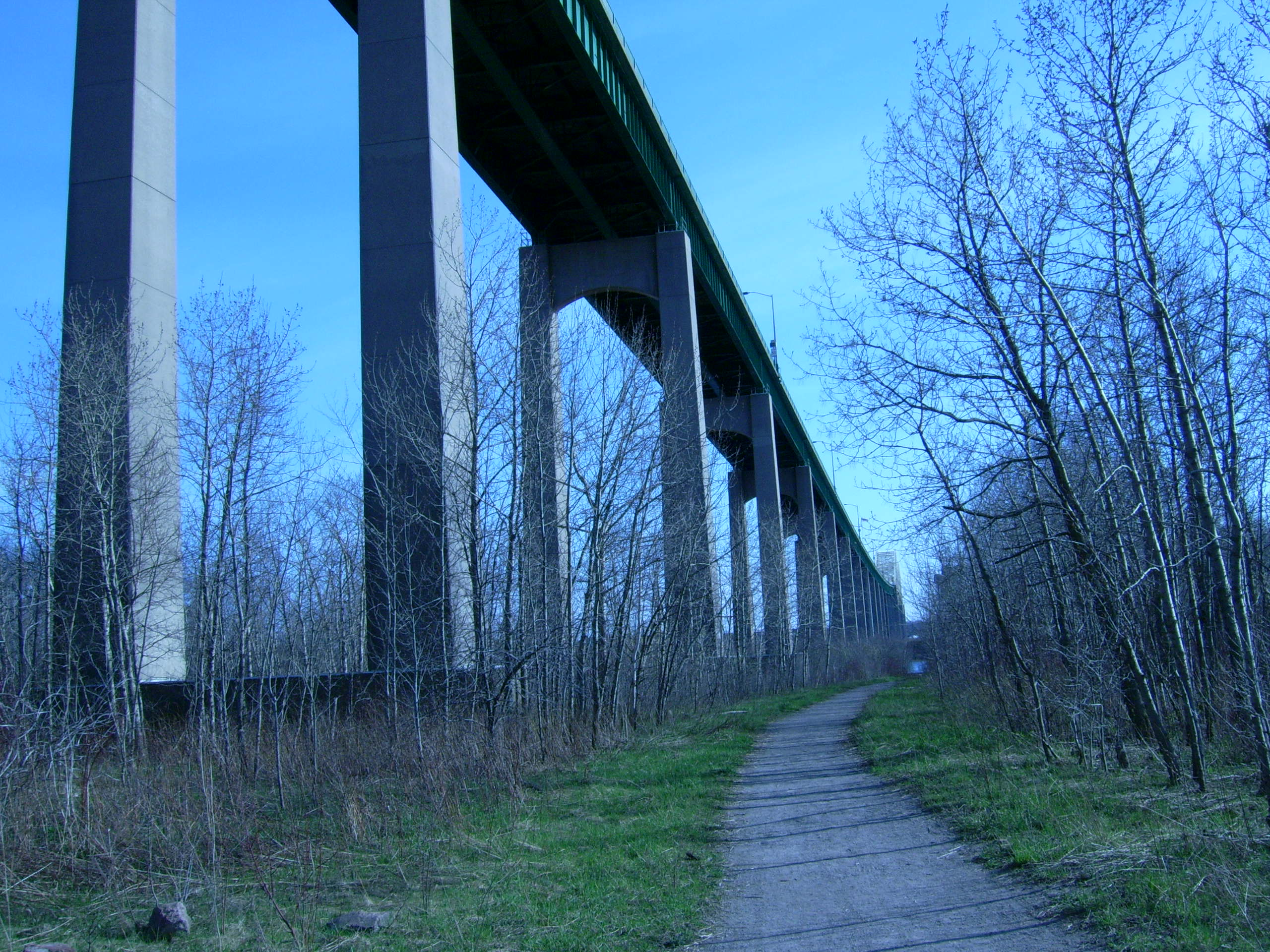
Center portion of the bridge in 2006

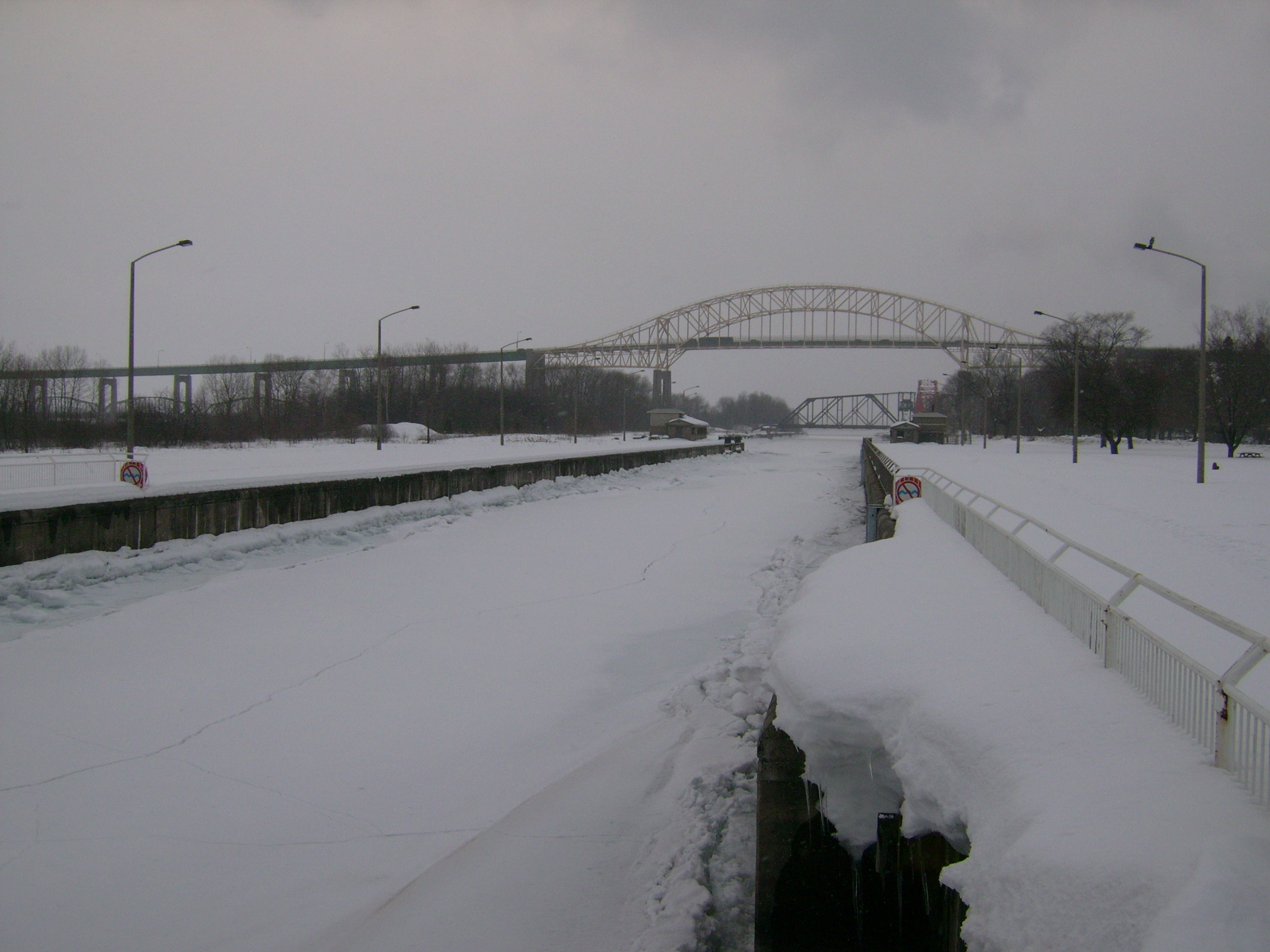
The bridge in winter in 2013

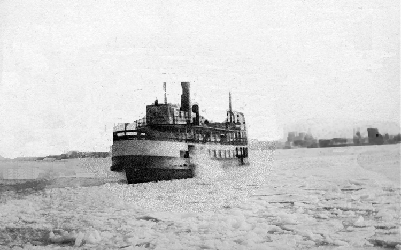
This ferry carried vehicles and passengers across the border prior to the construction of the International Bridge

== See also ==
- List of bridges in Canada
- List of international bridges in North America
