= Orin William Angwall =

American politician

- Born: September 18, 1890; Marinette, Wisconsin, US
- Died: December 6, 1974 (aged 84); Menoninee, Michigan, U.S.
- Occupations: lake captain, fisherman, politician

Orin William Angwall or Orin W. Angwall (September 18, 1890 – December 6, 1974) was an American lake captain, commercial fisherman, and politician. He served in the Wisconsin legislature and was mayor of Marinette.

== Biography ==
Angwall was born in Marinette, Wisconsin. He was a lake captain from 1912 to 1932 and later a commercial fisherman. (Note: In 1948 he was badly injured when he became entangled in a flywheel as he picked up his fishing nets. In 1953 while piloting the Four Brothers, he helped rescue Captain Lawrence Belanger, at the helm of Atlantis, after the fish tug's rear cutty and engine were damaged in a southwesterly blow. Angwall had to battle through 25 miles of Lake Superior's high seas and fierce wind to summon aid from Manistique, Michigan.) (Note: In 1949, as a local fish broker, he offered his opinion that the disappearance of smelt from local rivers was hard to explain.) Angwall served on the Marinette common council and was mayor of Marinette in 1947 and 1948.

Angwall served in the Wisconsin State Assembly in 1943 and 1945 as a Republican. He was a member of the Committee on Conservation and the Committee on Revision. Angwall was a delegate to the 1944 Republican National Convention However, in 1948, after initially leading at the polls, he was defeated as a delegate. Angwall also served on the Republican party's State Central Committee in the same year.

Angwall served as president of the Marinette Chamber of Commerce and also on the Marinette city police and fire commission. Later he was president of the Glenwood Pipeline Company in Arkansas City, Kansas. Angwall ultimately retired in Menominee, Michigan.

== Boats owned ==
He was the owner of the fishing schooner Hustler, (Note: "Oak schooner built in 1893 at Detroit, Mich. Owned by Capt. Orin Angwall. lost in 1917.... On Nov. 8, 1912, she burned near Peshtigo Harbor, Wis. Probably rebuilt. In 1917 she burned and sank at Menominee, Mich.") which exploded and sank without loss of life in Green Bay in 1917.

In 1927 he came to own the flat-bottomed scow schooner, City of Grand Haven, which was built by Duncan Robertson and was originally owned by Kirby, Furlong & Co. (Note: The City Of Grand Haven had two masts "set far apart to accommodate high piles of lumber on the deck and to make it easier to load and unload the vessel. This rig was called the Grand Haven Rig or (Jack Ass Rig)..." It was said to have been the result of a serendipity, when the master of a three-masted schooner had its mainmast removed due to rot, and found how well the ship sailed. There "were at least a dozen craft with this rig many of them in Lake Michigan." See Jackass-barque.)

He owned the J.H. Stevens, an 1859 schooner constructed by D. Edwards at Milan, Ohio. On June 10, 1927, while owned by Angwall, the ship burned near Presque Isle, Michigan. There were no deaths. (Note: At Presque Isle, Michigan on June 10, 1927, the Sloop J.H. Stevens "burned to a total loss." The J.H. Stevens had been involved in another accident. On October 20, 1881 the Lumber hooker Daisy Day (which was accident prone) was damaged at Sturgeon Bay "when struck by the schooner J.H. Stevens.")

From 1944 to 1971, he owned the Kate A, a Fish Tug built by Marinette Marine Corporation.

He was also the owner of a unique ship: the Mindemoya (Note: Perhaps named for Lake Mindemoya located within Manitoulin Island, which is the largest island in a freshwater lake (Lake Huron).) (Propeller) – later rechristened the Yankcanuck when it was owned by the Yankcanuck Transportation Company – which was the last composite constructed vessel sailing the Great Lakes. (Note: As The Maritime History of the Great Lakes wrote: "There are many ships on the Great Lakes on the Canadian side from 50 to 60 years old, but the YANKCANUCK, built in 1889 in Wyandotte Mich, is the only composite hull ship still in operation. A composite hull ship has oak planking about six to eight inches thick below the water line with steel frame and all steel above the water line." "Her final dimensions were 256' 09" (78.26m) x 41' 00" (12.50m) x 22' 06" (6.86m); 1,813 GRT and powered by a 1,200 i.h.p. (883 KW) triple expansion steam engine with 2 coal-fired scotch boilers. Laid up in 1957 and scrapped in 1960, the Yankcanuck ... was the last vessel of composite construction sailing on the Great Lakes. The Yankcanuck name was derived from the fact that Captain Frank Manzzutti was a Canadian and his wife, an American.")

== Legacy ==
Angwall was married to Mary Ellen (née Maguire) Angwall. They had three children, two daughters – Margaret and Helen – and one son. Their son, Robert O. Angwall, also became a Great Lakes Captain and Marinette businessman and civic leader. Angwall died in Menoninee December 6, 1974. His and Mary's remains are interred at Forest Home Cemetery in Marinette.

== Archival material ==
- Orin W Angwall. Hustler (Archival material). OCLC 21556877.
- Orin W Angwall; C Tuxbury; et al. C.E. Redfern (Archival material). OCLC 19880542.
- D Edwards; Joseph Blair; E Brouty; R Hanley; J Davis; A Chamberlain; A Morris; D Gibbs; L Gibbs; F Eickmeyer; W T Eickmeyer; John Olsen; Louis Olsen; D H Lakey; Peter Goodlet; Orin W Angwall. "J.H. Stevens". WorldCat (Archival material).
