= Consort (nautical) =

Unpowered Great Lakes vessels

Consort is a nautical term with two related meanings; it is used to describe any ship deliberately accompanying another, but in the context of Great Lakes vessels, it refers to an unpowered schooner barge or steamer barge, towed by a steamer or tugboat.

1. Consort is a nautical term for unpowered Great Lakes vessels, usually a fully loaded schooner barge or steamer barge, towed by a larger steamer that would often tow more than one barge. The consort system was used in the Great Lakes from the 1860s to around 1920. Mariner and historian Mark Thompson wrote that the unpowered barges were "uninspected vessels" not regulated by the marine safety laws. He reported that between 1870 and 1940, the dangerous practice of towing unpowered vessels resulted in many of the most serious groundings when they broke loose or were cut loose during storms.

2. Consort is also used as the term for any ship sailing alongside another, particularly as an escort or ship's tender. Pirates who sailed in small fleets were often described as sailing "in consort" to one another, that is, one ship following or escorting another to whom it was allied; for example; Thomas Howard's Prosperous and John Bowen's Speedy Return:

"The Speedy Return sailed with her prize to the Malabar Coast where they had agreed to rendezvous should they accidentally part company. Six days later the Prosperous joined her consort but without any prize, though she had taken one which she robbed ... "

Another example from the US Congressional Record of 1917, discussing whether neutral merchant ships could lawfully attack submarines:

"Suppose the case of two vessels of ours, sailing in consort we will say, or one within reach of the S.O.S. call of another on the high seas. ... certainly the consort of that vessel, or any other vessel hearing the S.O.S. call, must at once make its escape and get away from the submarine instead of going to the assistance of its sister vessel so being illegally attacked."

== See also ==
- Miztec (schooner barge)
- Minnedosa (schooner barge)
