= Soo Locks =

Navigational structures in Sault Ste. Marie, Michigan

- St. Marys Falls Canal
- U.S. National Register of Historic Places
- U.S. National Historic Landmark
- Michigan State Historic Site
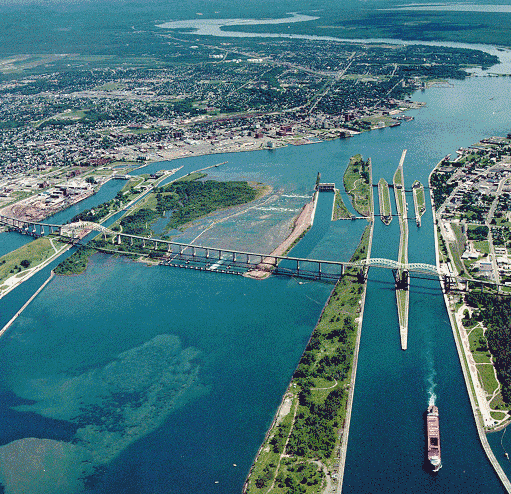
- Aerial view of the Soo Locks. View is looking east, with Canada on the left and the United States on the right

- Location within Michigan Location within the United States
- Interactive map
- Location: Sault Ste. Marie, Michigan
- Coordinates: 46°30′12″N 84°21′00″W
- Built: 1855; 171 years ago
- Architect: Corps of Engineers
- NRHP reference No.: 66000394

Significant dates
- Added to NRHP: November 13, 1966
- Designated NHL: November 13, 1966
- Designated MSHS: February 12, 1959

The Soo Locks (sometimes spelled Sault Locks but pronounced /su/ SOO) are a set of parallel locks, operated and maintained by the United States Army Corps of Engineers, Detroit District, that enable ships to travel between Lake Superior and the lower Great Lakes. They are located on the St. Marys River between Lake Superior and Lake Huron, between the Upper Peninsula of the U.S. state of Michigan and the Canadian province of Ontario. They bypass the rapids of the river, where the water falls 21 ft (6.4 m). The locks pass an average of 10,000 ships per year, despite being closed during the winter from January through March, when ice shuts down shipping on the Great Lakes. The winter closure period is used to inspect and maintain the locks.

The locks share a name (usually shortened and anglicized as Soo) with the two cities named Sault Ste. Marie, in Ontario and in Michigan, located on either side of the St. Marys River. The Sault Ste. Marie International Bridge between the United States and Canada permits vehicular traffic to pass over the locks. A railroad bridge crosses the St. Marys River just upstream of the highway bridge.

The first locks were opened in 1855. Along with the Erie Canal, constructed in 1824 in central New York State, they were among the great infrastructure engineering projects of the antebellum United States. The Soo Locks were designated a National Historic Landmark in 1966.

== United States locks ==
The U.S. locks form part of a 1.6 mi (2.6 km) canal formally named the St. Marys Falls Canal. The entire canal, including the locks, is owned and maintained by the United States Army Corps of Engineers, which provides free passage. The first iteration of the U.S. Soo Locks was completed in May 1855; it was operated by the state of Michigan until transferred to the U.S. Army in 1881.

=== Locks ===
The configuration consists of two parallel lock chambers. Starting at the Michigan shoreline and moving north toward Ontario, these are:

- The MacArthur Lock, built in 1943. It is 800 ft (240 m) long, 80 ft (24 m) wide, and 29.5 ft (9.0 m) deep. This is large enough to handle ocean-going vessels ("salties") that must also pass through the smaller locks in the Welland Canal. The first vessel through was the SS Carl D. Bradley. Per 33 CFR § 207.440 (v), "The maximum overall dimensions of vessels that will be permitted to transit MacArthur Lock are 730 feet in length and 75 feet in width, except as provided in paragraph (v)(1) of this section." Per U.S. Army Corps of Engineers, Sault St Marie, the length of the ship is restricted to 730’ due to the southwest wall alignment entering and exiting the MacArthur Lock.
- The Poe Lock, built in 1896. The first vessel to pass through was the U.S. Army Corps of Engineers tug USS Hancock. The original Poe Lock was engineered by Orlando Poe and, at 800 ft (240 m) long and 100 ft (30 m) wide, was the largest in the world when completed in 1896. The lock was re-built in 1968 to accommodate larger ships, after the Saint Lawrence Seaway opened and made passage of such ships possible to the Great Lakes. It is now 1,200 ft (370 m) long, 110 ft (34 m) wide, and 32 ft (9.8 m) deep. It can take ships carrying 72,000 short tons (65,000 t) of cargo. The Poe is the only lock that can handle the large lake freighters used on the Upper Lakes. The first passage after the rebuild was by the Phillip R. Clarke in 1969.

=== Former locks ===
- The State Lock, built between 1853 and 1855. The State of Michigan was given land by the federal government to construct a lock to allow for quicker transit of new copper and iron ore deposits discovered around the Lake Superior basin. The lock consisted of two chambers back-to-back to bridge the difference in water level. Each chamber was 350 ft (110 m) long, 70 ft (21 m) wide at the top of its walls and 61.5 ft (18.7 m) at its bottom, and 12 ft (3.7 m) deep. The State Lock was replaced by the original Poe Lock in 1896.
- The Weitzel Lock, was built between 1873 and 1881 directly south of the State Lock, and was the first lock to be operated by the federal government. At 515 ft (157 m) long, 80 ft (24 m) wide, and 17 ft (5.2 m) deep, it was the longest lock in the world upon its completion. It was decommissioned in 1919, and was eventually replaced by the MacArthur Lock in 1943.
- The Davis Lock, built in 1914. At the time of its completion, the Davis Lock was the longest lock in the world at 1,350 ft (410 m) long, and was also 80 ft (24 m) wide and 23 ft (7.0 m) deep. It was officially decommissioned in 2010.
- The Sabin Lock, built in 1919. It was constructed as a twin lock to the Davis Lock, and named after Louis Carlton Sabin (1867-1950), the designer of both locks, who served as General Superintendent of the ship canal at The Soo from 1906 to 1925. It was officially decommissioned in 2010 at the same time as the Davis Lock.

=== New lock ===
A new lock is under construction and is slated to be completed by 2030. Groundbreaking for the new lock project was held on June 30, 2009. The lock will be equal in size to the Poe Lock and will provide much needed additional capacity for the large lake freighters. The new lock replaces two locks (Davis Lock and Sabin Lock), which were obsolete and used infrequently. In May 2020, construction on Phase One of the replacement of the Sabin Lock was started.

North of the new lock is an additional channel with a small hydroelectric plant, which provides electricity for the lock complex.

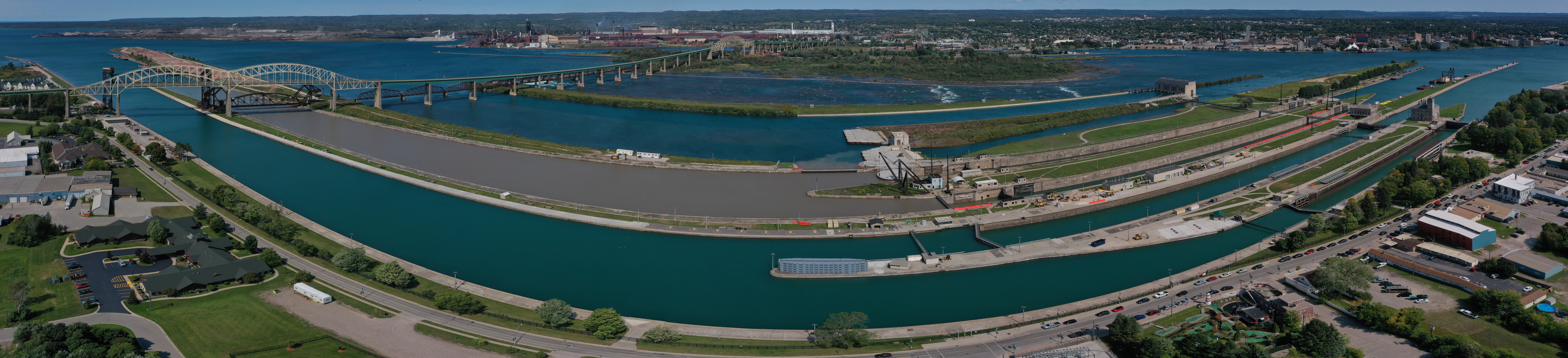
Soo locks and the Sault Ste. Marie International Bridge that has a clearance of 124 feet

=== Engineers Day ===
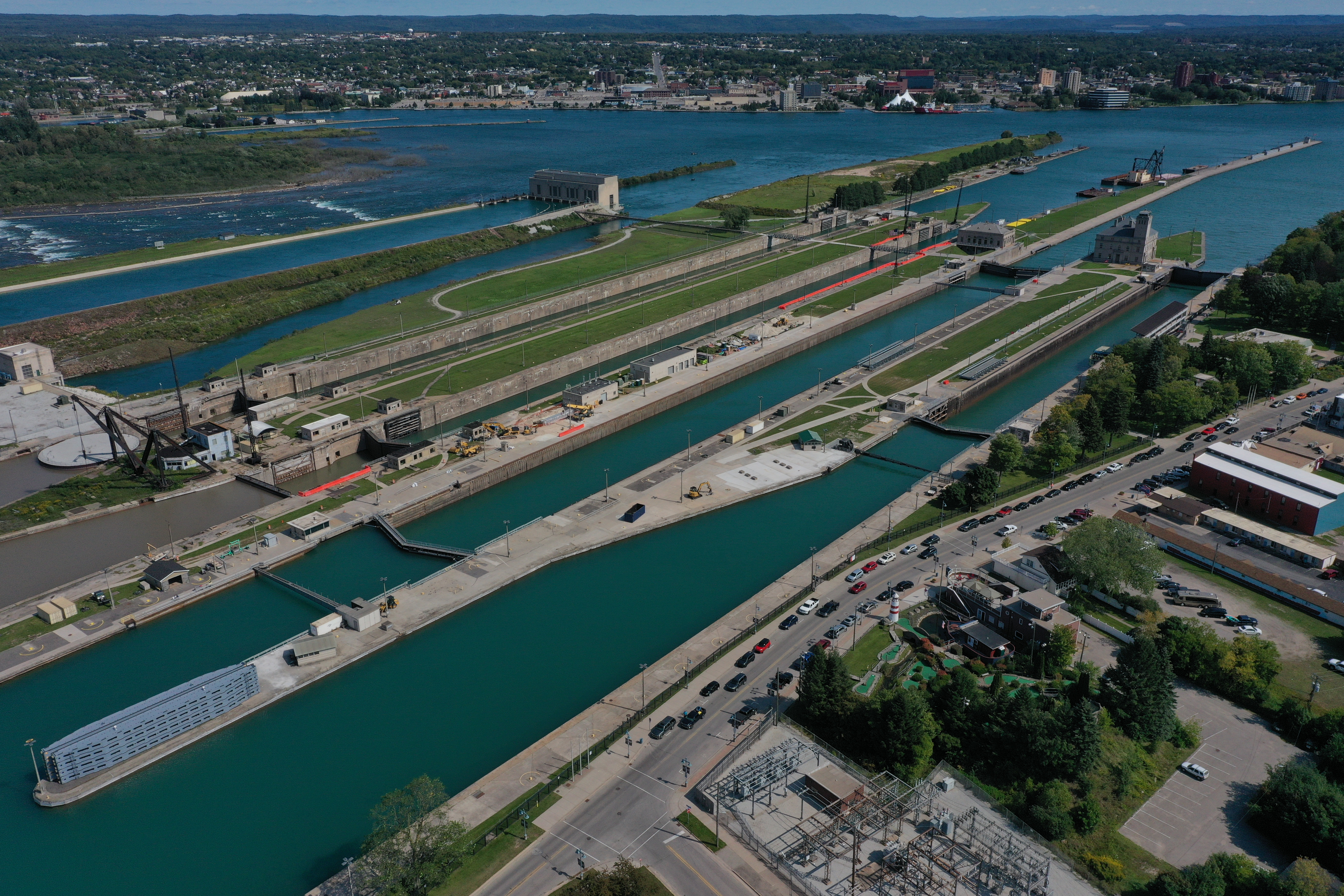
Soo Locks on the St. Marys River connecting Lakes Superior and Huron.

The U.S. Army Corps of Engineers, Detroit District, operates the Soo Locks Visitors Center and viewing deck for the public. On the last Friday of every June, the public is allowed to go behind the security fence and cross the lock gates of the U.S. Soo Locks for the annual Engineers Day Open House. During this event, visitors are able to get close enough to touch ships passing through the two regularly operating locks. Other than on that day, because the locks are United States Federal property under command of the U.S. Army Corps of Engineers, unauthorized personnel and civilians are restricted from the locks under threat of fines or imprisonment for trespassing.

== Canadian lock ==
The first lock to be built in the St. Marys River was on the Canadian side in 1798 by the Northwest Fur Company to facilitate the fur trade. It was destroyed by the Americans in 1814 during the War of 1812 to disrupt British trade. Currently, a single small lock is operated on the Canadian side of the Soo. Opened in 1895, it was rebuilt in 1987, and is 77 m (253 ft) long, 15.4 m (51 ft) wide and 13.5 m (44 ft) deep. The Canadian lock is used for recreational and tour boats; major shipping traffic uses the U.S. locks.

== Gallery ==
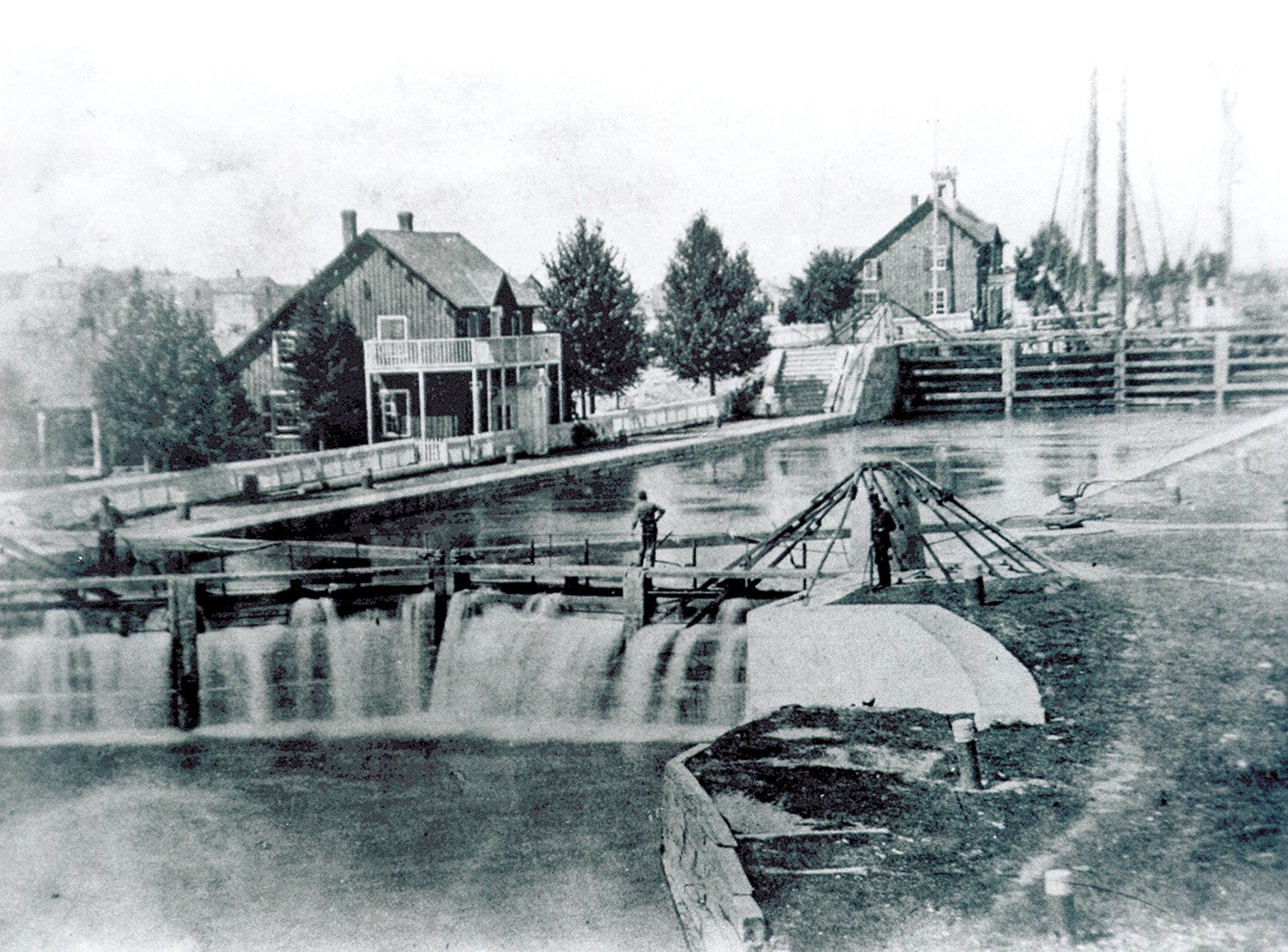
The first Soo Locks in the 19th century

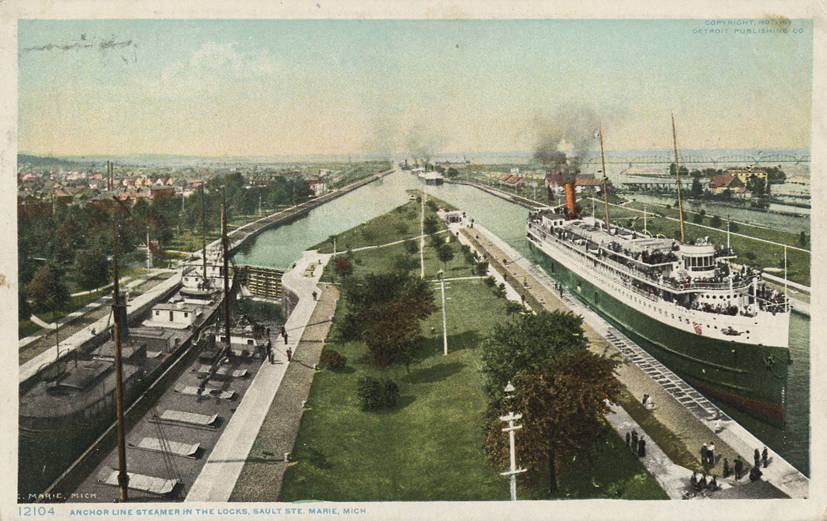
Anchor Line steamer in the Soo Locks, ca. 1900s

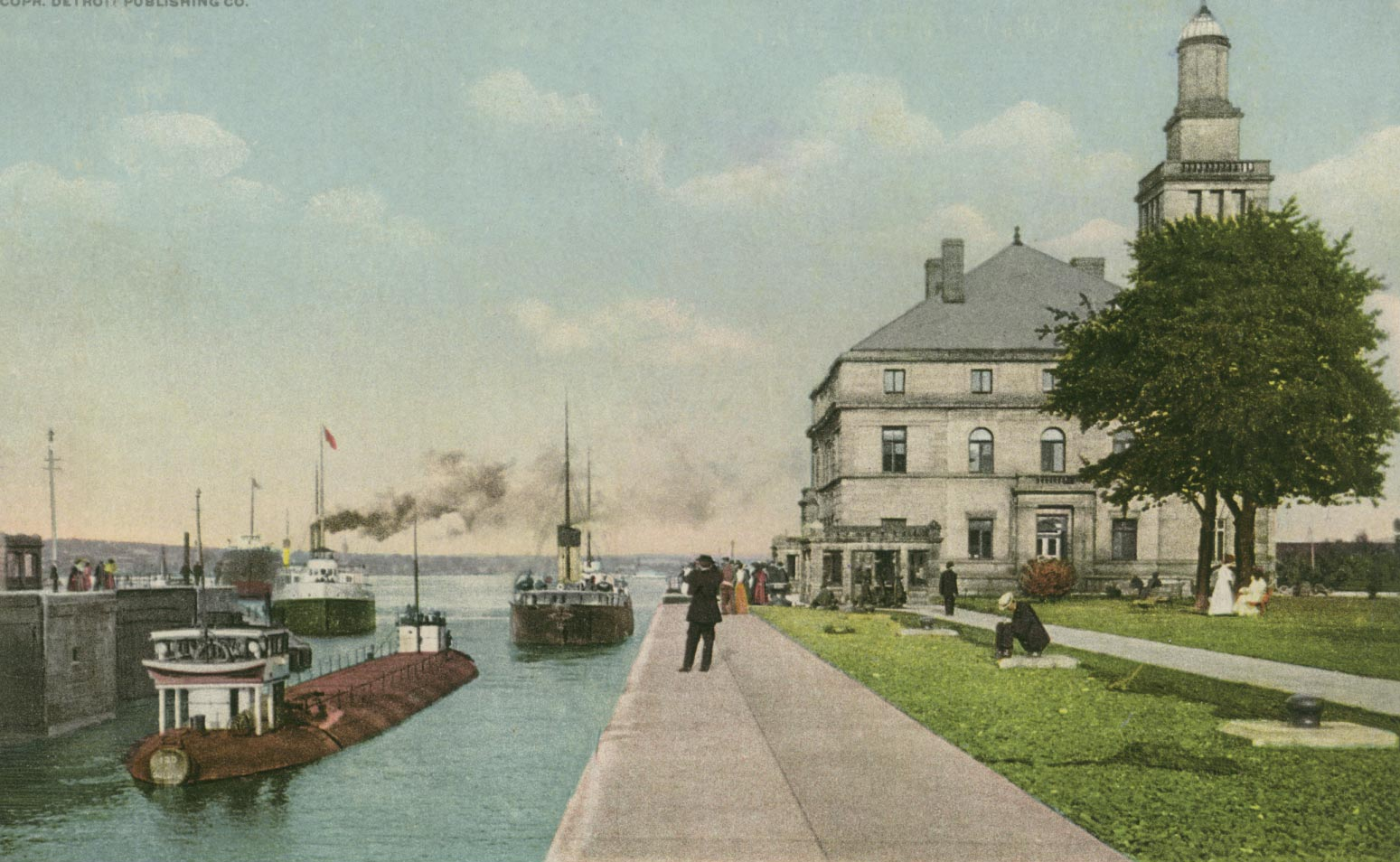
A whaleback traverses the Poe Lock, ca. 1910

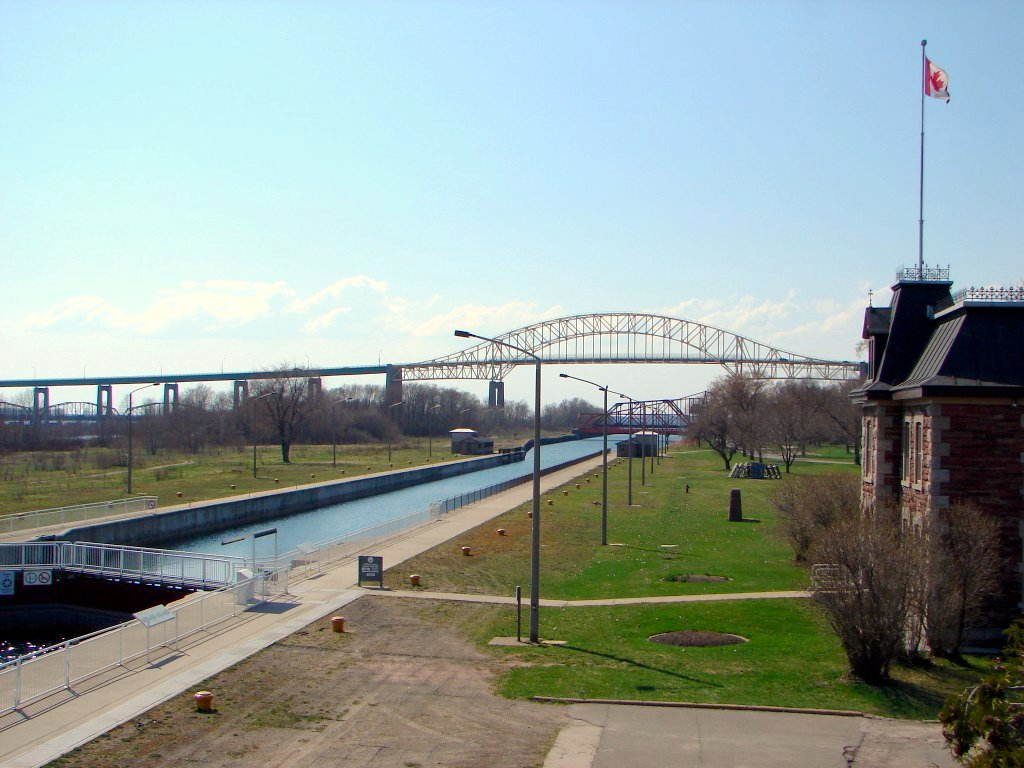
Canadian Lock at Sault Ste. Marie, Ontario

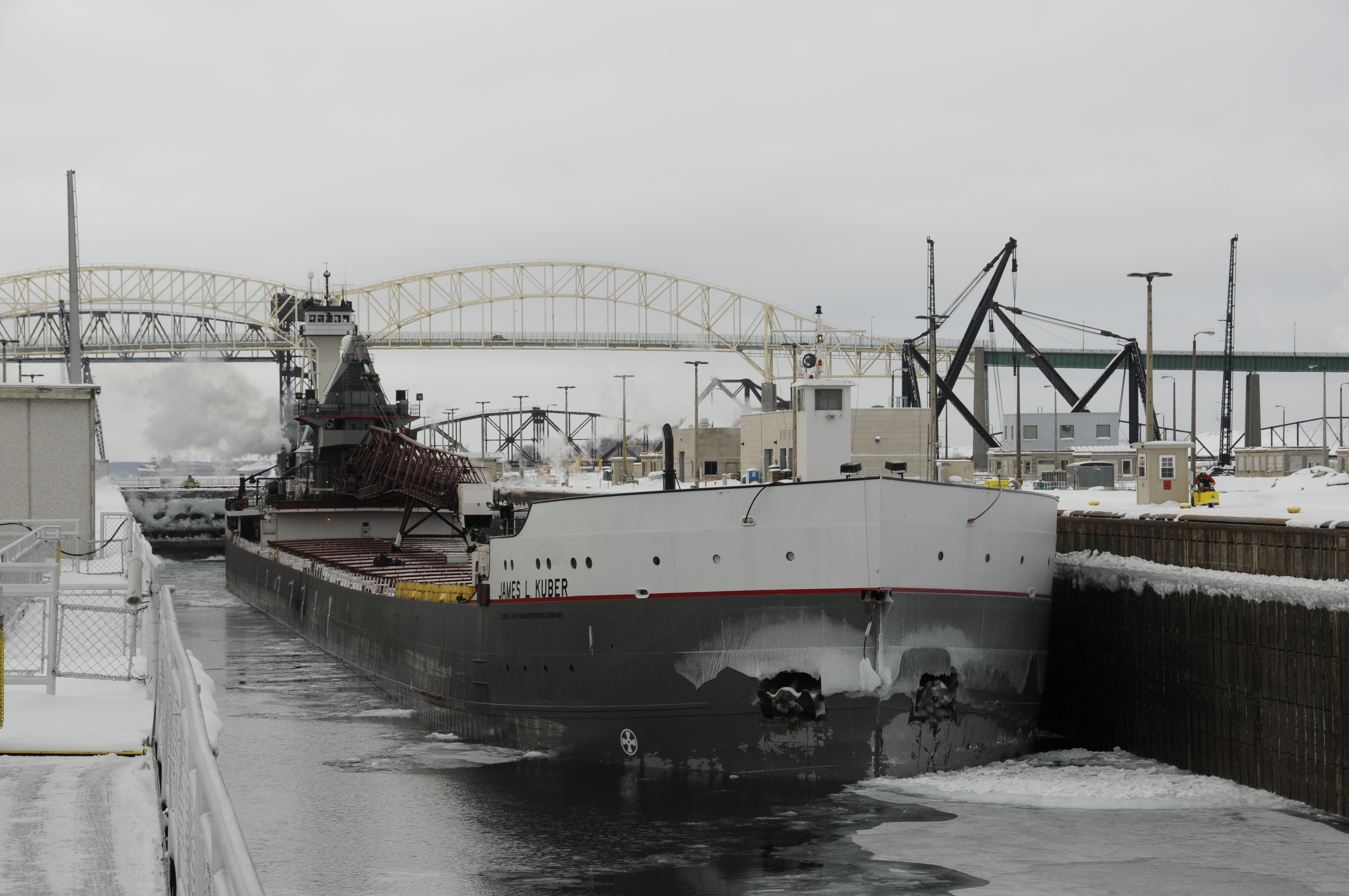
The last ship of the 2013 season passes through the Poe Lock

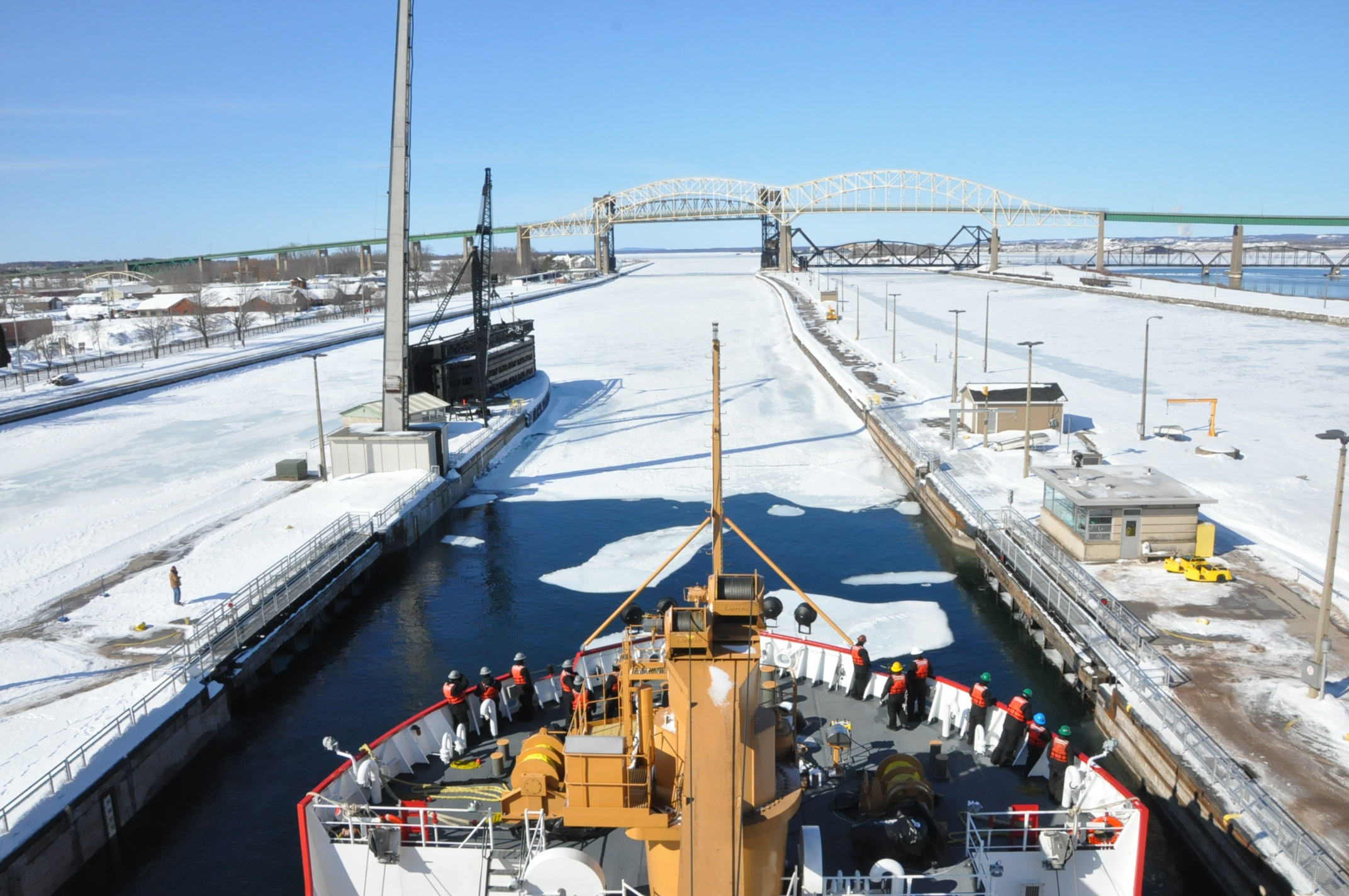
USCGC Mackinaw passes through Soo Locks
