= Schooner barge =

Ship type

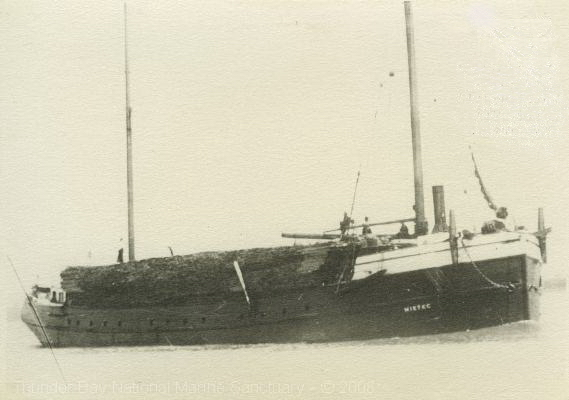
Miztec, after conversion as a schooner barge

A schooner barge is a schooner converted for use as a barge. Schooner barges originated on the Great Lakes in the 1860s and were in use until World War II, although a few survived into the 1950s.

Even though steamboats were used for time-critical routes such as for passengers and mail, schooners were still economical to use for bulk cargoes such as grain, wood, or iron ore. Steam tugs were introduced on the Great Lakes that could tow one or more barges. Since old schooners were available, they could be adapted to towing service with reduced crews. When winds were favorable, the schooner barge could have one or two sails rigged to save fuel in the steam tug. Eventually, schooner-rigged wooden ships were purposely built for use as barges. The concept was later extended to salt-water use, with, for example, the United States Navy converting some schooners for use as barges for coal.

Because of rough weather and small crews, schooner barges were frequently lost from tows, set adrift during bad weather, or sunk. By the 1920s, schooner barges were no longer in practical use on the Great Lakes since steam and diesel powered ships provided better operating flexibility and safety, with lower crew costs than a tug and barges hauling the same amount of cargo.

== See also ==
- Thames sailing barge
