= Whitefish Point Light =

Lighthouse in Michigan, United States

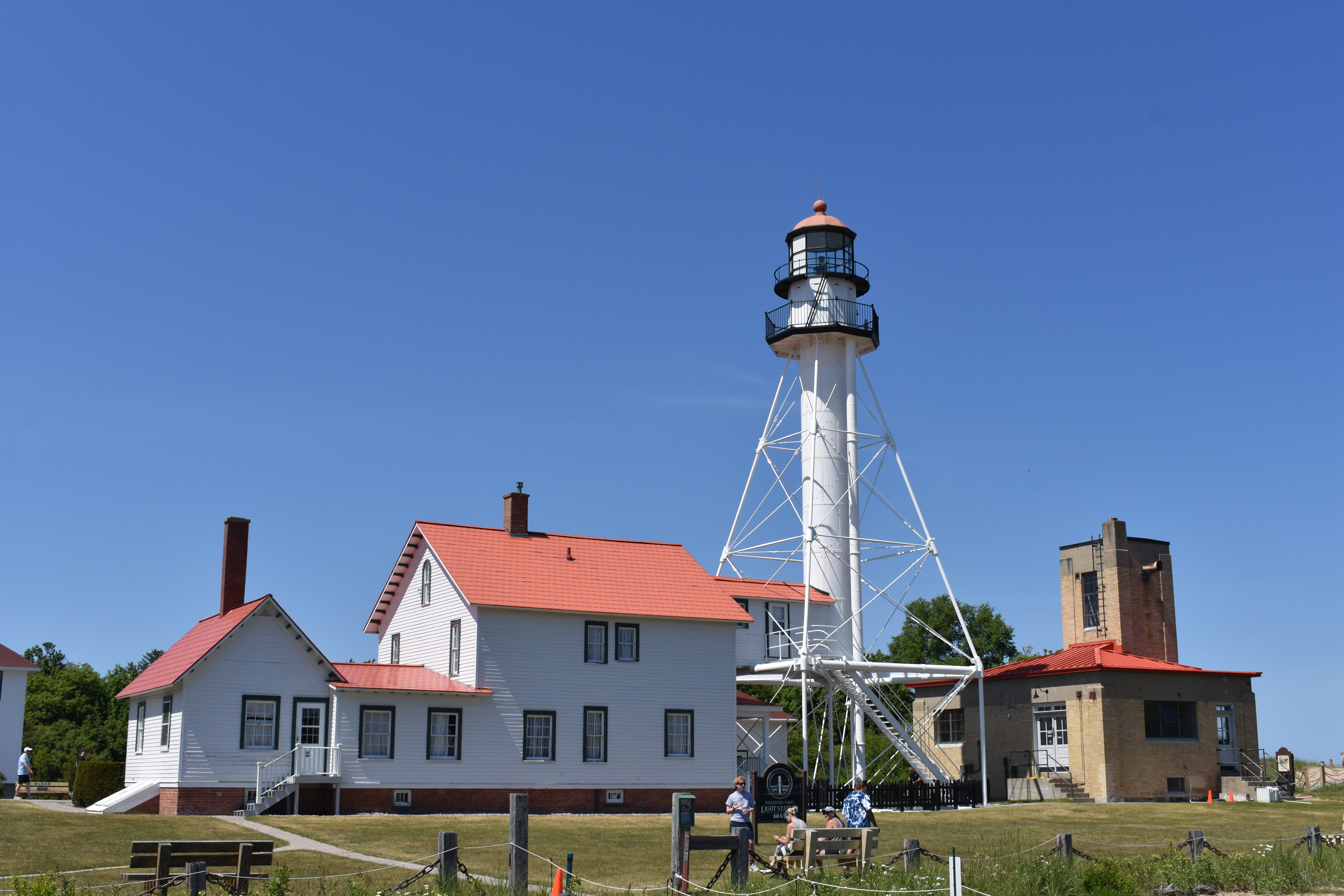
- Whitefish Point Light in July 2026
- Location: Whitefish Point; Whitefish Township, Michigan
- Coordinates: 46°46′16″N 84°57′27″W

Tower
- Foundation: Pier
- Construction: Steel
- Automated: 1971
- Height: 76 ft (23 m)
- Shape: Lattice Tower
- Heritage: National Register of Historic Places listed place, Michigan State Historic Site
- Racon: O

Light
- First lit: 1849
- Focal height: 80 ft (24 m)
- Lens: 3rd order Fresnel Lens (original), Light-emitting diode (LED) lantern (current)
- Intensity: RACON: O (– – –). Standby light of reduced intensity.
- Range: 15 nmi (28 km; 17 mi)
- Characteristic: Fl(2) W 20s
- Whitefish Point Light
- U.S. National Register of Historic Places
- Michigan State Historic Site
- NRHP reference No.: 73000947

Significant dates
- Added to NRHP: February 28, 1973
- Designated MSHS: February 22, 1974

The Whitefish Point Light is a lighthouse located in Chippewa County in the U.S. state of Michigan. Located on the southeastern shores of Lake Superior, it sits at the edge of Whitefish Point leading to Whitefish Bay. Constructed in 1849 by congress, it is the oldest operating lighthouse in the Upper Peninsula. All vessels entering or exiting Lake Superior pass near Whitefish Point. The area is known as the "Graveyard of the Great Lakes" due to the high number of shipwrecks in the area, including the SS Edmund Fitzgerald.

The lighthouse is part of the Great Lakes Shipwreck Museum complex, which contains numerous relics from shipwrecks of the Whitefish Point Underwater Preserve, including the bell of the SS Edmund Fitzgerald. The lighthouse itself was listed on the National Register of Historic Places in 1973 and again as a Michigan State Historic Site in 1974.

== History ==
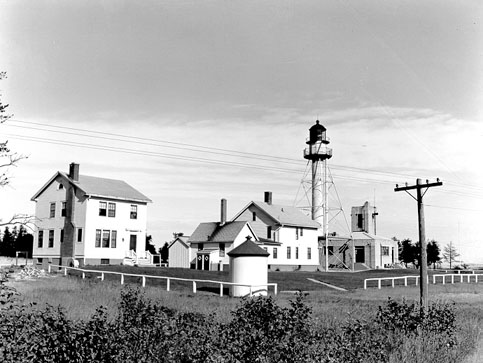
Vintage image of Whitefish Point Light

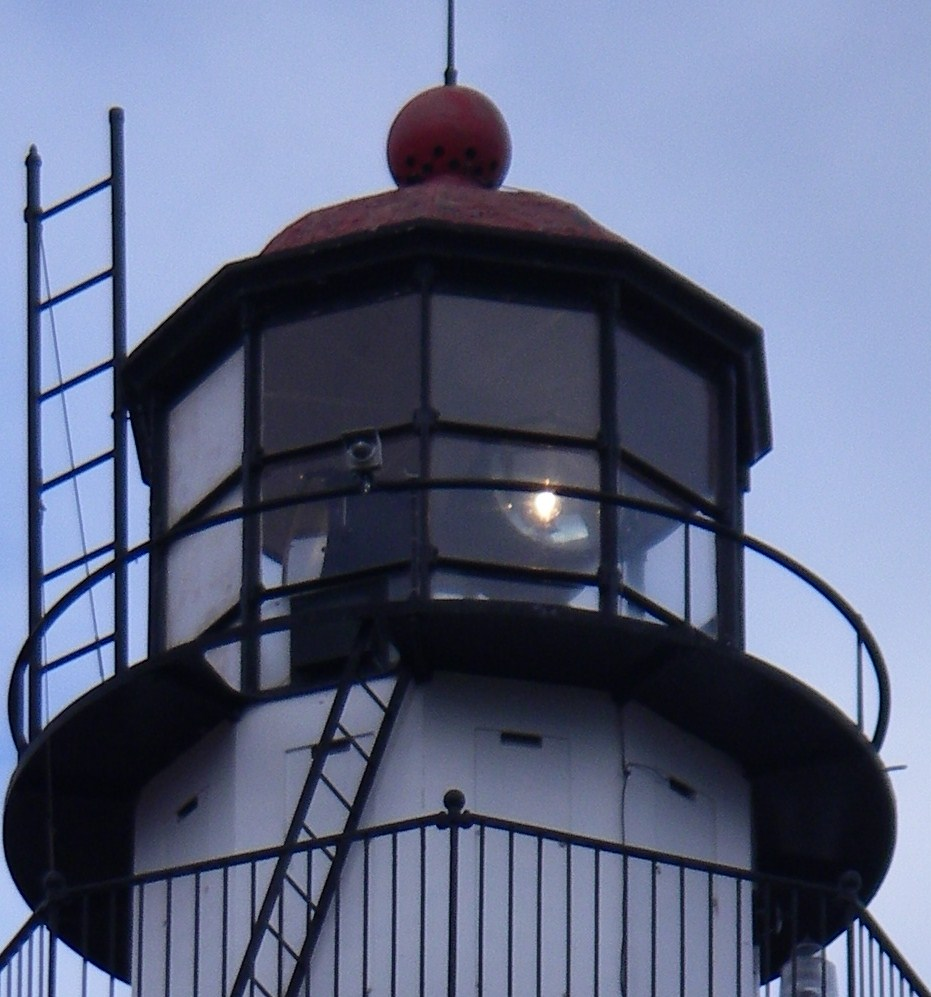
The DCB-224 Carlisle & Finch aerobeacon in operation at Whitefish Point on November 3, 2007

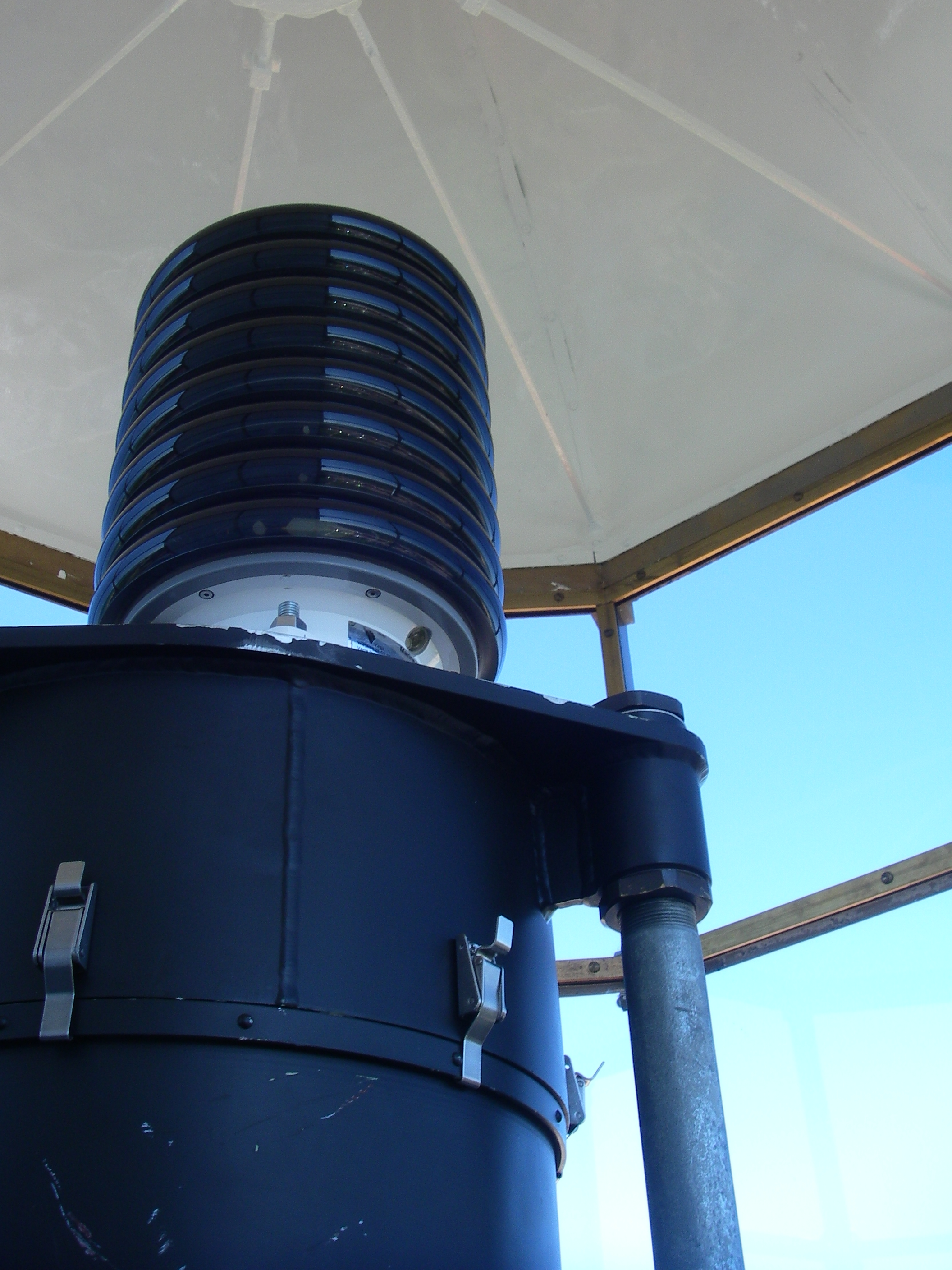
The light-emitting diode lantern installed at Whitefish Point in August 2011

Construction on the first light began in 1847, and the lighthouse was said to resemble that at Old Presque Isle Light. First lit in 1849, it was one of the first lighthouses on the shores of Lake Superior. It is the oldest active light on the lake, standing at the point of land that marks the course change for vessels coming from the southern coast of Lake Superior, known as the "Graveyard of the Great Lakes", to the Soo Locks. All vessels entering or leaving Lake Superior must past Whitefish Point. Whitefish Point Light is arguably the most important light on Lake Superior. The Whitefish Point area has more shipwrecks than any other area in Lake Superior.

The original structure was outfitted with Lewis lamps, which were thereafter upgraded to a fourth order Fresnel lens. The current structure, while modern looking, is a Civil War relic. Built in 1861, the iron skeletal steel framework was designed to relieve stress caused by high winds. A similar design is used at Manitou Island Light in Lake Superior. It was equipped with a third order Fresnel lens.

In 1968, the light was replaced with a DCB-224 aero beacon manufactured by the Carlisle & Finch Company. According to Volume 7 of the U.S. Coast Guard light list, it was visible for a distance of 26 nautical miles (48 km; 30 mi) in clear weather conditions, and had two unevenly spaced eclipses, and two flashes within every 20 second period. Putting aside questions of nostalgia, aesthetics, or appreciation for the engineering of a bygone era (as exemplified by the Fresnel lens), this iteration of lighthouse illumination was itself incredibly effective, and an endangered remnant of another bygone era.

The station was automated in 1971.

In 2011, the U.S. Coast Guard Local Notice to Mariners reported reduced intensity of the Whitefish Point light from June 7, 2011, until August 16, 2011, when the DCB-224 Series Carlisle & Finch aerobeacon lens was changed to a light-emitting diode (LED) lantern with a reduced range of 15 nautical miles (28 km; 17 mi) as permitted by Coast Guard rules and regulations adopted in 2003 for private aids to navigation. The aerobeacon lens is stored in a building at the Great Lakes Shipwreck Museum complex for possible future public display.

The lighthouse is home to the Great Lakes Shipwreck Museum, which has many artifacts from numerous shipwrecks in the Whitefish Point Underwater Preserve, most notably, the bell from the SS Edmund Fitzgerald, which was recovered from the wreck in 1995. The Great Lakes Shipwreck Museum is open during the tourist season from 10 am to 6 pm, every day through October 31. The organization that operates the museum got 80.079% of its funding from the public in the year 2010.

The light is considered iconic, and has been the subject of memorabilia. An official Michigan Historical Marker was erected in 1974. It is Registered Site L0272. The marker notes:

- This light, the oldest on Lake Superior, began operating in 1849, though the present tower was constructed later. An early stopping place for Indians, Voyageurs, Coureur des bois and Jesuit missionaries, the point marks the course change for ore boats and other ships navigating this treacherous coastline to and from St. Mary's Canal. Since 1971 the light, fog signal, and radio beacon have been automated and controlled from Sault Ste. Marie.

The keepers were:

- 1848–1851: James B. Van Rensselaer
- 1851–1853: Amos Stiles
- 1853–1856: William C. Crampton
- 1856–1859: Belloni McGulpin
- 1859–1861: Charles Garland
- 1861–1864: Joseph Kemp
- 1864–1868: Thomas Stafford
- 1868–1874: Edward Ashman
- 1874–1882: Charles J. Linke
- 1882–1883: Edward Chambers
- 1883–1903: Charles Kimball
- 1903–1931: Robert Carlson

Whitefish Point is on the Lake Superior coastline known as the “Graveyard of the Great Lakes”. The numerous shipwrecks of Whitefish Bay include:

- Comet
- John B. Cowle
- Drake
- Samuel Mather
- Miztec
- Myron
- Niagara
- John M. Osborn
- Sagamore
- Superior City
- Vienna

These wreck sites are protected for future generations of sports divers by the Whitefish Point Underwater Preserve.

The site is a venue for remembrance of the S.S. Edmund Fitzgerald, and extends back to the 1816 loss of "the very first ship known to sail on Superior, the sixty-foot trading vessel Invincible," which upended in gale force winds and towering waves near there. "[E]very loss was tragic."

There are critics that claim that the stewardship of the Great Lakes Shipwreck Historical Society over this lighthouse caused it to be "overdeveloped." Michigan Audubon Society filed a lawsuit that accused the Great Lakes Shipwreck Historical Society of over-developing Whitefish Point and the United States Fish & Wildlife Service of not protecting the site. The lawsuit was settled in 2002 when the parties agreed to govern the site with a management plan. The former 44-acre Coast Guard site at Whitefish Point consists of 2.7 acres transferred to the Michigan Audubon Society and the Whitefish Point Bird Observatory, 8.3 acres transferred to the Great Lakes Shipwreck Museum, and 33 acres transferred to the US Fish and Wildlife Service administered by Seney National Wildlife Refuge. The 20-acre Helstrom Addition was added to the Whitefish Point Unit of the Seney National Wildlife Refuge in 2012 so that the US Fish and Wildlife Service now holds a total of 55 acres at Whitefish Point.

== Other uses ==
The Whitefish Point Unit of the Seney National Wildlife Refuge provides important migratory bird migration habitat for raptors, waterbirds, and songbirds. Whitefish Point is a designated Important Bird Area . The Whitefish Point Bird Observatory is a research and education facility operated in affiliation with Michigan Audubon, a State Chapter of the National Audubon Society. Whitefish Point is the best place in North America to observe the saw-whet owl. Most of Whitefish Point is a wildlife sanctuary, renowned for the variety of birds that pass through. The Michigan Audubon Society maintains a small information room informing birders particular species to observe as they hike along the trails network. A wooden walkway has been constructed to allow the visitor a chance to venture into the sanctuary area and observe wildlife. Whitefish Point is a target for migrating birds, including eagles, Northern goshawks, geese, falcons, hawks and owls.

The sandy beach along the point is a place to look for banded agates, especially after a storm or to take a walk along the sandy shoreline and enjoy Lake Superior.

In 2012, for the fourth year in a row after a 23-year absence, piping plovers nested at Whitefish Point, and successfully fledged offspring.

From M-123 in Paradise, go north on Whitefish Point Road for just over 11 miles (18 km) to Whitefish Point Lighthouse. It is well marked.

== See also ==
- Lighthouses in the United States
- Great Lakes Storm of 1913 and Shipwrecks of the 1913 Great Lakes storm

== Specialized further reading ==
- Hermanson, Don, True Lighthouse Hauntings, Revisited including Whitefish Point Light.
- Lynn, Bruce. "A Light is on in the Graveyard, Whitefish Point." (Aug 1997), pp. 1–3 Lighthouse Digest.
