= Graveyard of the Great Lakes =

Area of Lake Superior with many shipwrecks

The Graveyard of the Great Lakes comprises the southern shore of Lake Superior between Grand Marais, Michigan, and Whitefish Point, though Grand Island has been mentioned as a western terminus. More ships have wrecked in this area than any other part of Lake Superior.

Over 200 wrecks are in the area of Whitefish Point of the 550 wrecks in Lake Superior. For a distance west of Whitefish Bay, there are no natural harbors in which ships can "ride out" storms. As late as the 20th century, weather prediction was "a haphazard process, very imprecise and unreliable". A ship might have no idea of the weather into which it was sailing, or the weather coming at it.

These shipwrecks are now protected by the Whitefish Point Underwater Preserve.

== History ==
After the St. Lawrence Seaway was constructed, all inter-lake traffic on Lake Superior went at least near Whitefish Point.

Storms that claimed multiple ships include the Mataafa Storm in November 1905 and the Great Lakes Storm of 1913.

Due to the cold and fresh water, wrecks are often in quite good condition even after centuries underwater.

A documentary has been made about the Graveyard of the Great Lakes, as has a piece on Apple TV.

== Shipwrecks in the Graveyard of the Great Lakes ==
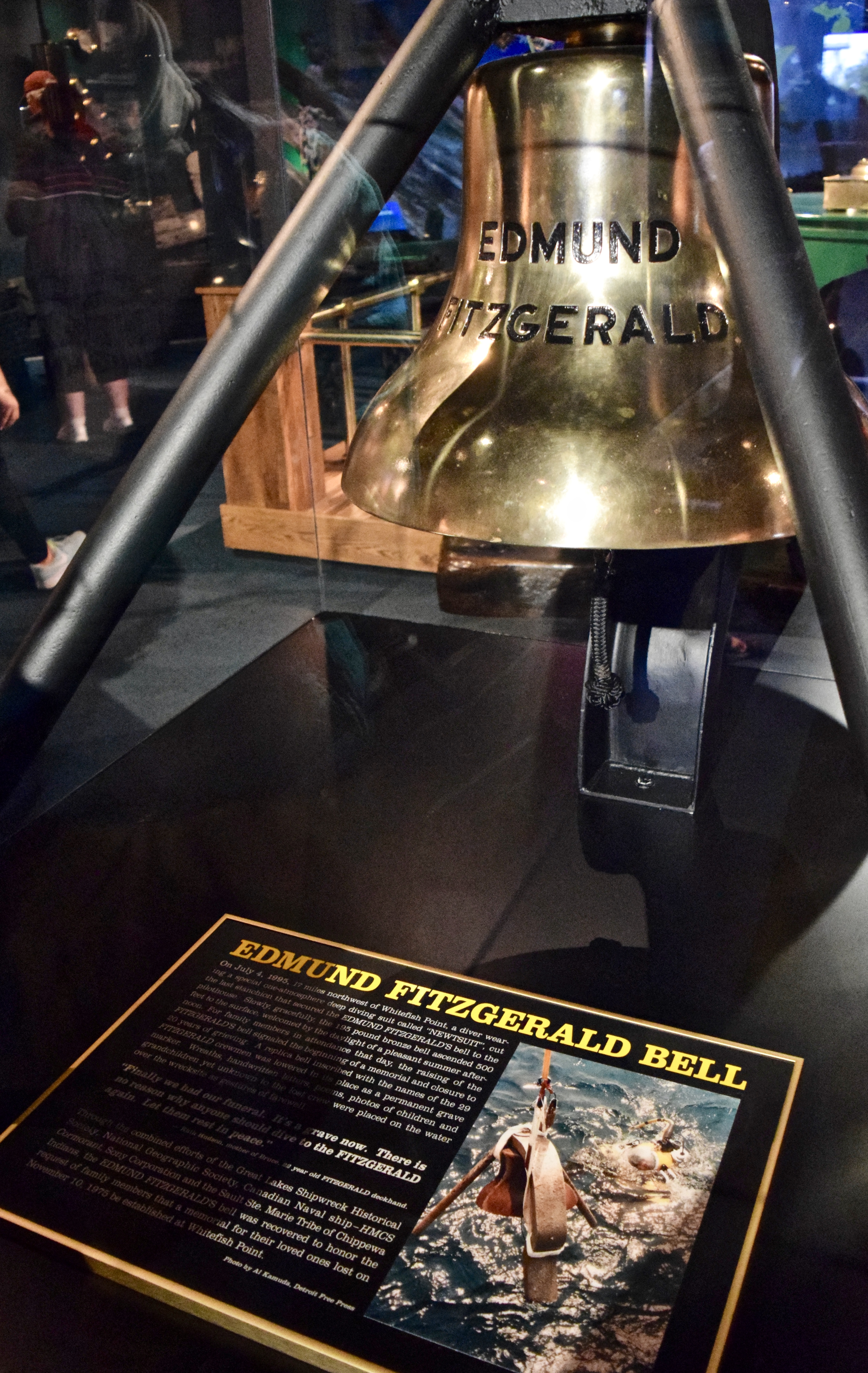
Bell from the SS Edmund Fitzgerald, now on display in the Great Lakes Shipwreck Museum

- 129
- Independence
- Lambton
- Miztec
- John M. Osborn
- SS Comet
- SS Cyprus
- SS D.M. Clemson
- SS Edmund Fitzgerald was the largest ship to ever wreck on the Great Lakes
- SS Indiana
- SS John B. Cowle
- SS John Mitchell
- SS M.M. Drake
- SS Myron
- SS Vienna
- SS Western Reserve

Another such place is known as "Shipwreck Alley," which is a 448-square-mile (1,160 km^{2}) area of the Lake Huron shoreline that holds an estimated 200 shipwrecks.

== See also ==
- Amboy and George Spencer Shipwreck Sites
- Great Lakes Shipwreck Museum
- Lake-effect snow
- List of storms on the Great Lakes
- Munising, Michigan
- Soo Locks
- Vermilion Point
- Whitefish Bay
- Whitefish Point Light Station
- Whitefish Point Underwater Preserve

== External links and references ==
- Lake Superior Marine Museum Association
- A Century-Old Mystery Surfaces From Lake Superior
- Great Lakes Shipwreck Museum
- National Geographic article, "Road Trip: Shipwreck Coast, Michigan"
- Whitefish Point Underwater Preserve
- 130 years after it sank, well-preserved wreckage of ship found in Lake Superior
- Great Lakes Shipwreck Museum
- Graveyard Of The Great Lakes (1988), a YouTube video
