= SS John B. Cowle =

Two merchant ships have been named SS John B. Cowle.

- SS John B. Cowle (1902), U.S. propeller, steamer, bulk freighter, Official No. 77559 . Sank in 1909 in Whitefish Bay in a collision with steamer Isaac M. Scott.
- SS John B. Cowle (1910), U.S. propeller, steamer, bulk freighter, Official No. 207277. Renamed Harry L. Allen 1969–1978. Scrapped 1978.
