= Sagamore (barge) =

Whaleback barge wrecked in Lake Superior

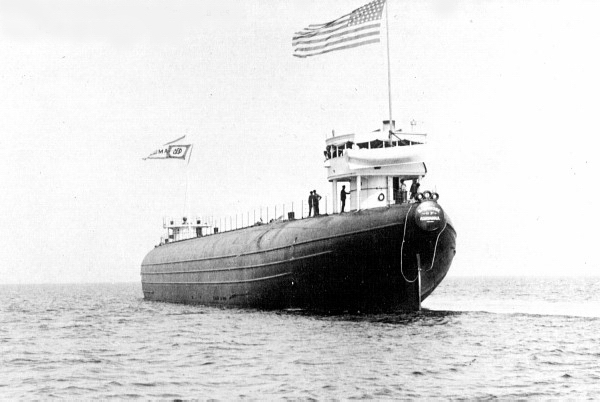
- Sagamore underway in 1892 shortly after its launch.

History

United States
- Name: Sagamore
- Owner: Huron Barge Company (Pickands, Mathers, & Co, Mgrs.)
- Port of registry: Marquette, Michigan
- Builder: American Steel Barge Company
- Completed: 1892
- Fate: Sank near Iroquois Point, Whitefish Bay 29 July 1901 in a collision with the Northern Queen
- Notes: Official No. 57932

General characteristics
- Type: Steamer, whaleback, barge
- Tonnage: 1,601 GRT; 1,557 NRT
- Length: 308 ft (94 m)
- Beam: 38 ft (12 m)
- Depth: 24 ft (7.3 m)

Sagamore is reported to be the best example of a whaleback barge among Great Lakes shipwrecks. Only 44 whalebacks were ever built, and out of the 26 that sank, only eight sank in the Great Lakes, most of them being blown up for blocking shipping channels. She sank in 1901 in the shipping lane near the Soo Locks when she was rammed by the steel steamer Northern Queen in one of Whitefish Bay's notorious fogs. Her captain and two crew members went down with her. Artifacts from her wreck were illegally removed in the 1980s. Her artifacts are now the property of the State of Michigan and are on display as a loan to the Great Lakes Shipwreck Museum. The wreck of the Sagamore is protected as part of an underwater museum in the Whitefish Point Underwater Preserve.

== Career ==
The SS Sagamore's keel was laid 15 December 1891 by the American Steel Barge Company and she was launched 23 July 1892 in Superior, Wisconsin. She was built as 1,601 gross ton whaleback steamer barge, 308 feet (94 m) in length, 38 feet (12 m) in beam, and 24 feet (7.3 m) in draft. She was enrolled in Marquette, Michigan. She was sold to the Huron Barge Company and managed by Pickands, Mather and Company of Ashtabula, Ohio. She was usually towed by her consort whaleback steamer, the Pathfinder. The Sagamore once unloaded a record 3,200 tons of iron ore in 8 hours at Ashtabula in 1893.

== Final voyage ==
On 29 July 1901, the Sagamore was anchored just off Iroquois Point with her consort, the Pathfinder, waiting for one of Whitefish Bay's legendary, thick fogs to clear. Both vessels were loaded with iron downbound from Duluth, Minnesota for Lake Erie. The steel steamer Northern Queen came suddenly through the fog on a collision course for the Pathfinder. The helmsman of the Northern Queen changed course to avoid the Pathfinder and headed directly for the Sagamore. The helmsman did not see the Sagamore due to the heavy fog. When the Northern Queen hit the Sagamore on the starboard side near the after turret, the Sagamore filled with water rapidly and sank. Five of the Sagamore's crew jumped to safety onto the deck of the Northern Queen, but three were lost. The Sagamore's Captain E. Joiner, the cook, and a sailor died in the collision.

The loss of the Sagamore was valued at $90,000. Shipwreck historian Cris Kohl reported, "The Northern Queen returned to Sault Ste. Marie, Michigan with the survivors and to make temporary repairs to her badly damaged hull. She eventually went into drydock for permanent repairs."

== Wreck ==
3D model of Sagamore's wreck

The wreck of the Sagamore was discovered in 1962 by Jack Brosco and Robert McCormick of Sault Ste. Marie in 45 to 65 feet (14 to 20 m) of water, mostly intact and sitting upright on a gravel bottom at 46°31.085′N 84°37.935′W. Scuba diver and shipwreck historian Cris Kohl reports that the Sagamore is "probably the best example of a whaleback steamer that can be found anywhere under the surface of the Great Lakes." Kohl describes the Sagamore as a long shipwreck with impressive triple tow rings mounted on her blunt-nosed bow, wide open hatches for easy access, and comfortable ambient lighting for swimming inside her hull. Kohl and other divers warn that the Sagamore is not usually buoyed as she lies in the middle of the busy freighter shipping lane near the Soo Locks.

The Sagamore's wreck was stripped of her artifacts over the years. Michigan’s Antiquities Act of 1980 prohibited the removal of artifacts from shipwrecks on the Great Lakes bottomlands. The Evening News reported a Michigan Department of Natural Resources and Environment 1992 raid on the Great Lakes Shipwreck Museum and its offices that found evidence of 150 artifacts illegally removed from the state-claimed bottomlands, including artifacts from the Sagamore. Following a settlement agreement, a single sheave block, shaving mug, pocket watch, mallet, pickax, saucer, and pitcher from the Sagamore are now the property of the State of Michigan and are on loan for display in the Great Lakes Shipwreck Museum.

The Sagamore's wreck is protected for future generations of scuba divers by the Whitefish Point Underwater Preserve as part of an underwater museum. Divers who visit the wreck sites are expected to observe preservation laws and "take nothing but pictures and leave nothing but bubbles". Great Lakes diver Steve Harrington cautions that "divers must be certain of their abilities and equipment" when diving the Whitefish Point Underwater Preserve.

== See also ==
- SS Meteor, an 1896 whaleback steamer converted into a museum ship in Superior, Wisconsin.
