= SS John B. Cowle (1902) =

Early Great Lakes bulk freighter sunk in Lake Superior

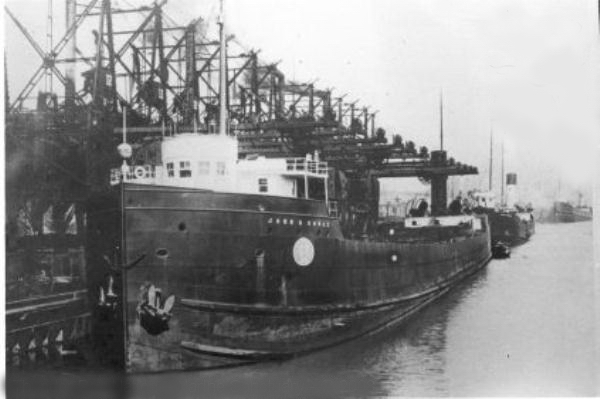
- John B. Cowle

History
- Name: John B. Cowle
- Namesake: John Beswick Cowle
- Owner: Cowle Transportation Co.
- Port of registry: (United States) Cleveland, Ohio
- Builder: Jenks Shipbuilding Co., Port Huron
- Cost: $270,000.00
- Yard number: 19
- Launched: 2 October 1902
- Sponsored by: Mrs. Cramer
- Completed: 1902
- Identification: US Official Number 77559
- Fate: Sank in Whitefish Bay 12 July 1909 after colliding with Isaac M. Scott

General characteristics
- Type: Bulk freighter
- Tonnage: 4,731 GRT; 3,911 NRT; 6,500 DWT
- Length: 420 ft (130 m)
- Beam: 50.16 ft (15.29 m)
- Depth: 24 ft (7.3 m)
- Installed power: 2,100 ihp (1,600 kW)
- Propulsion: 3-cylinder triple expansion engine
- Crew: 24
- Notes: Sank with the loss of 14 crewmembers

SS John B. Cowle was one of the early Great Lakes bulk freighters known as "tin pans". She was the first of two ships named for prominent Cleveland, Ohio citizen and shipbuilder John Beswick Cowle. In 1909 on her maiden voyage SS Isaac M. Scott rammed John B. Cowle in heavy fog off Whitefish Point. John B. Cowle sank in three minutes, taking 14 of her 24-man crew with her. Artifacts from her wreck were illegally removed in the 1980s. Her artifacts are now the property of the State of Michigan and are on display as a loan to the Great Lakes Shipwreck Museum. The wreck of John B. Cowle is protected as part of an underwater museum in the Whitefish Point Underwater Preserve.

== Career ==
The steamer John B. Cowle was built in 1902 by the Jenks Shipbuilding Company for the newly formed Cowle Transit Company. She was the first of two ships named for prominent Cleveland, Ohio citizen, John Beswick Cowle, who was part owner of the Globe Iron Works that built the first iron and steel Great Lakes bulk freighters, which were known as "tin pans". On 31 May 1906 she sank Erin in a collision off St. Clair, Michigan. Five of Erin's crew were killed.

By 1909 John B. Cowle was still owned by the Cowle Transit Company but for the sake of profit she was operated by the United States Transportation Company. Just several days prior to John B. Cowle's sinking, one deckhand left her at Detroit, Michigan after his father talked him into quitting and three more deckhands quit John B. Cowle at the iron ore dock in Two Harbors, Minnesota. The four replacement deckhands all drowned on John B. Cowle just two days later.

== Final voyage ==
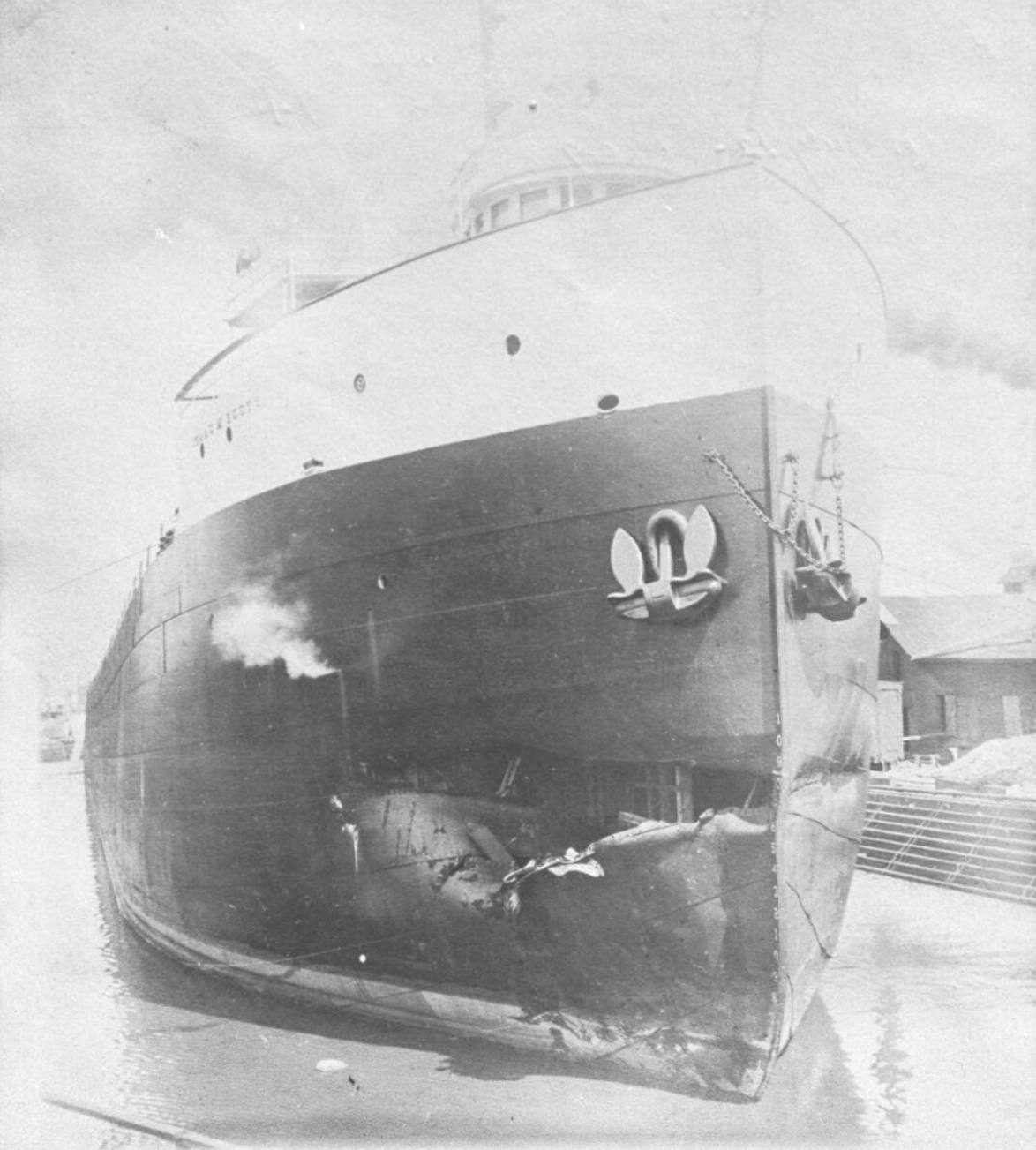
Isaac M. Scott after the collision with John B. Cowle

On 12 July 1909, the 420-foot (128 m), 4,731-ton John B. Cowle was laden with 7,023 tons of iron ore loaded at Two Harbors and downbound for Cleveland. The 524-foot (160 m), 6,372-ton Isaac M. Scott was a new steel steamer running light without cargo on her maiden voyage upbound for Duluth, Minnesota. The ship Frank H. Goodyear locked through the Soo Locks behind Isaac M. Scott, also upbound for Duluth through a fog-shrouded Whitefish Bay. In an era before radar, Captain Russel Hemenger of Frank H. Goodyear followed Isaac M. Scott with all of the pilothouse windows open and standing propped on a side sill for intense listening, navigating by compass, clock, and the lights and whistles of other ships.

By 4:00 am the dense fog off Whitefish Point caused Captain W.G. Rogers of John B. Cowle to check to half speed and blow fog signals at intervals of less than a minute. Isaac M. Scott suddenly loomed up full speed ahead broadside to John B. Cowle. Captain McArthur of Isaac M. Scott rang the chadburn for reverse and ordered, "Hard left, hard left!" It was too late and Isaac M. Scott rammed John B. Cowle, cutting her almost in two. The mate of Isaac M. Scott blew her whistle, and when Isaac M. Scott's engine found the reverse that was ordered before impact, the vessel's bow pulled from the massive hole in John B. Cowle. John B. Cowle listed and began to founder. A line was thrown from Isaac M. Scott's bow to the deck of the sinking John B. Cowle. Three sailors scrambled hand over hand onto Isaac M. Scott while other sailors ran for the rail and leaped into the lake in effort to get away from the suction of the sinking ship.

Captain Rogers of John B. Cowle managed to put a life preserver on his son who was sailing with him. Rogers was washed off as the ship sank, grabbed a piece of wreckage when he came back up, and was rescued in about 45 minutes. John B. Cowle's steward, B. Rogers, gave the following account:

When the ship sank, I was stuck in a whirlpool, wrenched and whirled till I thought my legs would be pulled off. I saw a body alongside me. It was Will Thomas, my assistant. I tried to revive him when a broken hatch cover came up and struck the lad on the head, crushing it. My life preserver came off and while I was floundering in the water, another hatch cover came up. I grabbed the ring and pulled myself up on it. I saw a foot sticking up from beneath it, and pulling it, found it to be Thomas McKernan, the son of the chief engineer. I pulled him up and he revived after a while. The lake was covered with wreckage and all around in the fog could be heard cries of "Help" but it was three quarters of an hour before the yawls of the Scott had been loosened and put in the water.

John B. Cowle sank in three minutes, taking 14 of her 24-man crew with her. Shipwreck historian Janice Gerred reported, "Five of the drowned crew were from Adams, New York. Captain Roger's son and brother, who was steward on the Cowle, were rescued. Two engineers, four firemen, four deckhands, the second cook, porter, and an oiler went down with the ship."

Shipwreck historian Wes Oleszewski reported that the crew of Frank H. Goodyear witnessed the collision through a series of sounds, "[F]irst a rumble like distant thunder ... then a distant groan, like tortured steel, accompanied by a series of deep-throated whistle blows ... and shouts through the distance ... [followed by] an earthquake-like rumbling. A hollow silence followed, then more shouts and screams." Captain Russel sounded the general alarm and creeped Frank H. Goodyear toward the sounds of disaster until they came to a full stop when men were in the water just off her bow. They lowered the boats and Frank H. Goodyear's crew began rescuing sailors. Captain Hemenger inched Frank H. Goodyear forward and used her spotlight to probe "through a jumble of wooden wreckage, oil drums, life rings and splashing sailors" until he came upon Isaac M. Scott with a massive hole in her bow. Captain Rogers and his mate were taken to Duluth on Frank H. Goodyear. The rest of John B. Cowle's crew were picked up by Isaac M. Scott and transported to Sault Ste. Marie, Michigan.

The loss of John B. Cowle was valued at $285,000. Her cargo of iron ore was valued at $25,000 but was not insured. Isaac M. Scott was heavily damaged with two forward compartments holed. She returned to the shipyard for reconstruction work costing $30,000. After a lengthy investigation and hearings, the United States Steamboat Inspectors of Marquette, Michigan ruled that John B. Cowle was going too fast for prevailing conditions and suspended Captain Rogers and Pilot Edward E. Carlton for 30 days even though Rogers claimed that he had checked down to bare steerage way. Pilot F.W. Wertheimer of Isaac M. Scott was beached for one year for excessive speed and failure to signal.

Tragedy would end the careers of both other vessels involved in the incident.

The Frank H. Goodyear would ironically be sunk in a collision in fog with the Steamer James B. Wood in 1910 on Lake Huron, taking 18 of 23 people with her.

The Isaac M. Scott sailed for four more years until she was lost with all hands on Lake Huron in the Great Storm of 1913.

== Wreck history ==
Painting of John B. Cowle's wreck

Archaeological site plan

The wreck of John B. Cowle was discovered in 1972 in 220 feet (67 m) of water, 1.5 miles (2.4 km) south of Whitefish Point at 46°44.435′N 84°57.877′W. When her wreck was discovered, the steering wheel still turned, and the inscription "John B. Cowle" was clearly visible on her bell. The log was still intact, was retrieved, and is now maintained in the Great Lakes Historical Society's Ship's Logs Collection. The wreck has one of the few intact pilothouses on Lake Superior shipwrecks. The captain's quarters and office were located in Texas-style bow cabins behind the pilothouse.

In the ensuing years following her discovery, John B. Cowle's wreck was stripped of her artifacts. Michigan's Antiquities Act of 1980 prohibited the removal of artifacts from shipwrecks on the Great Lakes bottomlands. The Evening News reported a Michigan Department of Natural Resources and Environment 1992 raid on the Great Lakes Shipwreck Museum and its offices that found evidence of 150 artifacts illegally removed from the state-claimed bottomlands, including artifacts from John B. Cowle. The State of Michigan filed a lawsuit against the Great Lakes Shipwreck Historical Society. Following a settlement agreement, John B. Cowle's steering wheel, two gauges, three electric lamps, binoculars, a cup, a saucer, a jug, a capstan cover, and a paneling section are now the property of the State of Michigan and are on loan for display in the Great Lakes Shipwreck Museum.

John B. Cowle's wreck is protected for future generations of scuba divers by the Whitefish Point Underwater Preserve as part of an underwater museum. The 1892 wreck of the steamer Vienna lies to her south and the 1884 wreck of the steamer John M. Osborn lies to her north. Divers who visit the wreck sites are expected to observe preservation laws and "take nothing but pictures and leave nothing but bubbles".

Great Lakes diver Harrington cautions that John B. Cowle is a deep wreck that carries considerable risks in diving and "divers must be certain of their abilities and equipment" when diving the Whitefish Point Underwater Preserve.

== See also ==
- Graveyard of the Great Lakes
