= SS M.M. Drake =

American steam barge that sank in Lake Superior

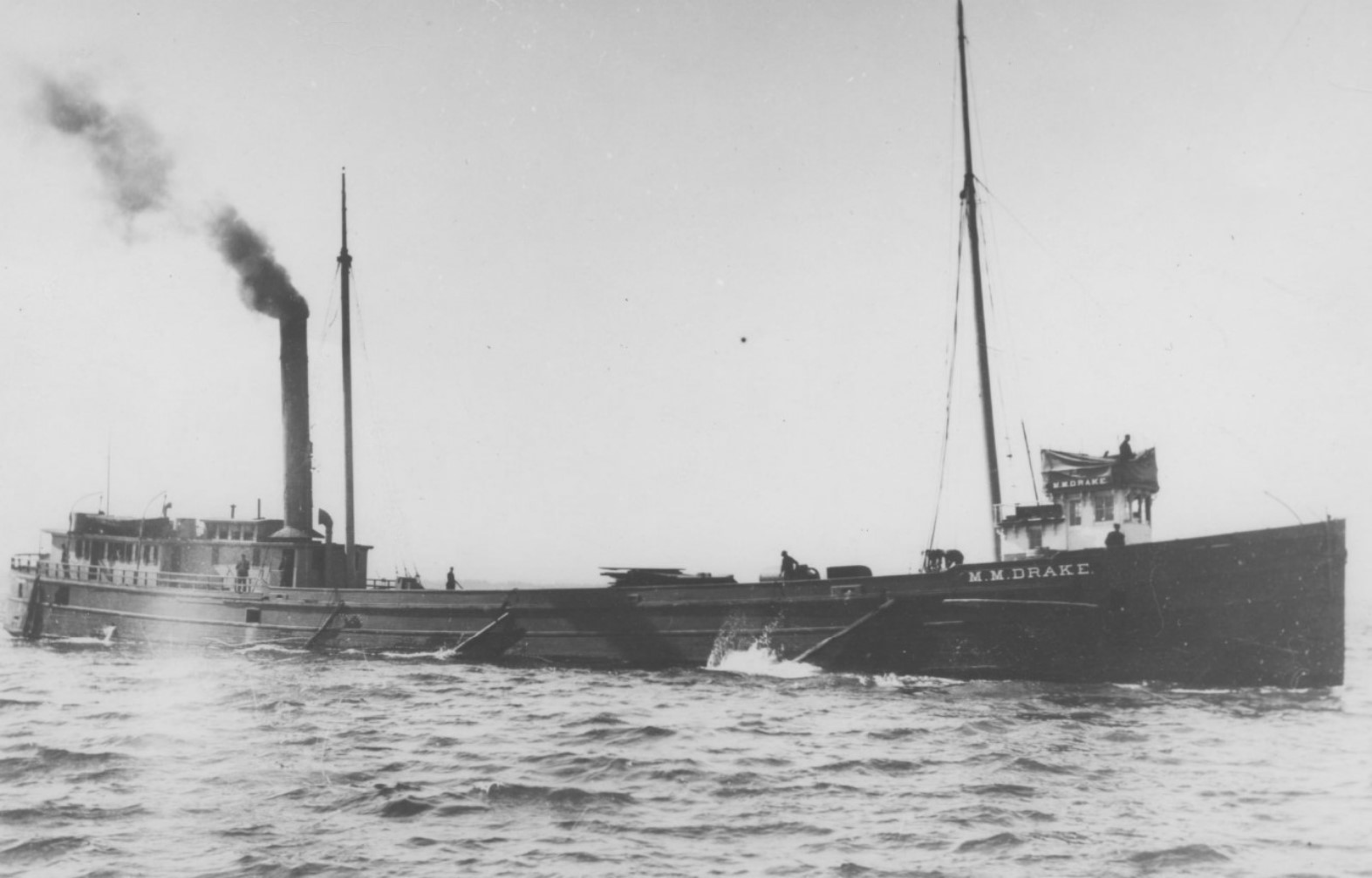
- SS M.M. Drake underway

History

United States
- Name: M.M. Drake
- Owner: John Green, Buffalo, New York
- Port of registry: Buffalo, New York
- Builder: Union Dry Dock Company
- Completed: 1882
- Identification: Official No. 91485
- Fate: Foundered off Vermilion Point in Lake Superior with her tow, schooner Michigan on 2 October 1901

General characteristics
- Type: Steamer, propeller, barge
- Tonnage: 915 GRT 762 NRT
- Length: 201 ft (61 m)
- Beam: 34.42 ft (10.49 m)
- Depth: 14.5 ft (4.4 m)

SS M.M. Drake was a wooden steam barge that towed consorts loaded with coal and iron ore on the Great Lakes. She came to the rescue of the crews of at least four foundering vessels in her 19-year career only to meet the same fate in her final rescue attempt. Drake sank in 1901 off Vermilion Point after a rescue attempt of her consort Michigan. Her rudder, anchor, and windlass were illegally removed from her wreck site in the 1980s. They are now the property of the State of Michigan. The rudder is on display as a loan to the Great Lakes Shipwreck Museum and the anchor and windlass are on loan for display to Whitefish Township Community Center. The wreck of Drake is protected as part of an underwater museum in the Whitefish Point Underwater Preserve.

== Career ==
Drake was constructed in 1882 in Buffalo, New York as a wooden steam barge and named for the line superintendent of her building company, Marcus Motier Drake. The Drake started her career in September 1882 by towing the barge F.W. Gifford. In 1883 she was chartered for Lake Erie to Duluth, Minnesota for coal and from Marquette, Michigan to Lake Erie for iron ore. She ran aground at the Fox Islands in September 1883. In 1885 she was re-admeasured and had upper decks added at the Union Dry Dock Company in Buffalo, New York. James Corrigan of Wickliffe, Ohio became her third and final owner in 1889.

During her nineteen-year career, she came to the rescue of distressed vessels and she had several mishaps of her own, including stranding on a reef in 1882, running ashore in 1888 near Cheboygan, Michigan, and striking a bar and sinking at the dock in Duluth, Minnesota in 1889. In 1883, Drake rescued the crew of her consort, the 347-ton schooner Dot (the former Mary Merrit), when Dot began leaking and sank off Grand Marais, Michigan. In 1889, Drake picked up 3 passengers and the 15-man crew from the wooden steam barge Smith Moore that had been sideswiped by James Pickands in heavy fog. Drake towed Smith Moore for six hours when Smith Moore finally sank only 300 feet (91 m) from the bar at the mouth of the Munising, Michigan harbor. In 1900, Drake rescued the eight-man crew from the leaking schooner-barge R. Hallaran that foundered off Keweenaw Point near Stannard Rock Light. Drake saved at least four crews from foundering vessels during her career but her final rescue of her own consort's crew caused a fatal blow to her structure that resulted in her suffering the same fate.

== Final voyage ==
On 1 October 1901, Drake headed into a storm on Lake Superior with her consort, the 27-year-old, three-masted schooner barge Michigan, both heavy with iron ore loaded at Superior, Wisconsin. As Drake labored through frigid rain and 55 miles per hour (89 km/h) wind, by 2 October 1901, the seams of Michigan's planking began to leak at a rate that overwhelmed her pumps. The flooded and dense iron ore cargo made it likely that Michigan would sink without warning before the dawn of the day.

Captain John McArthur Jr., of Michigan, ordered the thick towing hawser pulled in within hailing distance of Drake to communicate their status by shouts amplified with a megaphone. It was decided that Michigan's crew would be removed in the pitch black night as there was no chance of launching Michigan's yawl in the prevailing winds. Michigan was drawn up to Drake so that her bow was up against Drake's stern quarter on the leeward side. With the two wooden hulls grinding against each other, the crew of Michigan leaped to Drake when the waves brought the two decks level to one another. Just as the last of the Michigan's crew were safely transferred to Drake, the wind carried Michigan into a sea trough causing her jib boom that jutted forward from her forepeak to rake across length of Drake. Drake's after cabin was fractured and her tall smoke stack was lopped off and shoved overboard.

Drake was mortally wounded. The loss of her smoke stack prevented a proper draft to her boilers to form a full head of steam to her engines and part of that steam was diverted to the pumps needed to stay ahead of the flooding below decks caused by the fractured after cabin. Without full steam, Drake's Captain J. W. Nicholson, could not keep her from hanging up in the sea trough in gale-force winds even though he ordered the crew to break up her cabins to feed a wood fire that burned hotter than a coal fire.

When Northern Wave, a two-year-old steel package freighter, headed upbound out of Whitefish Bay shortly after 6:00 that morning, she spotted the struggling Drake flying a distress signal from one her masts and the crew frantically swarming the cabins with fire axes and bare hands. When Captain M.S. Peterson eased Northern Wave to the windward side of the foundering Drake, three crew members leaped to the deck of Northern Wave. Heavy seas prevented the steel Northern Wave from staying alongside for a rescue of Drake's crew without risking her wooden hull. Northern Wave attempted to tow the water-logged Drake but the hawser immediately snapped. Captain Peterson informed Captain Nicholson by megaphone that he would standby in case Drake's crew could be taken off but both knew the near impossibility of launching the lifeboats in the gale.

By late afternoon Drake had slowed to a crawl due to her inability to keep up steam. Northern Wave still hovering nearby. The situation appeared hopeless until the steel freighter, Crescent City, came upon the struggling Drake. Crescent City was nearly twice the size of Drake and she used her massive hull to provide an artificial lee from the gale-force wind. Michigan's cook, Harry Brown, leaped toward Crescent City before the two vessels were close enough and was swallowed by Lake Superior. The rest of the crew waited until the hulls of the two ships were grinding together and all of them safely jumped to Crescent City by 17:00. Crescent City reached the Soo Locks with Michigan and Drake crews at 2:00 on 3 October 1901.

Drake was a $35,000 loss and Michigan was a $19,000 loss.

== Wreck history ==
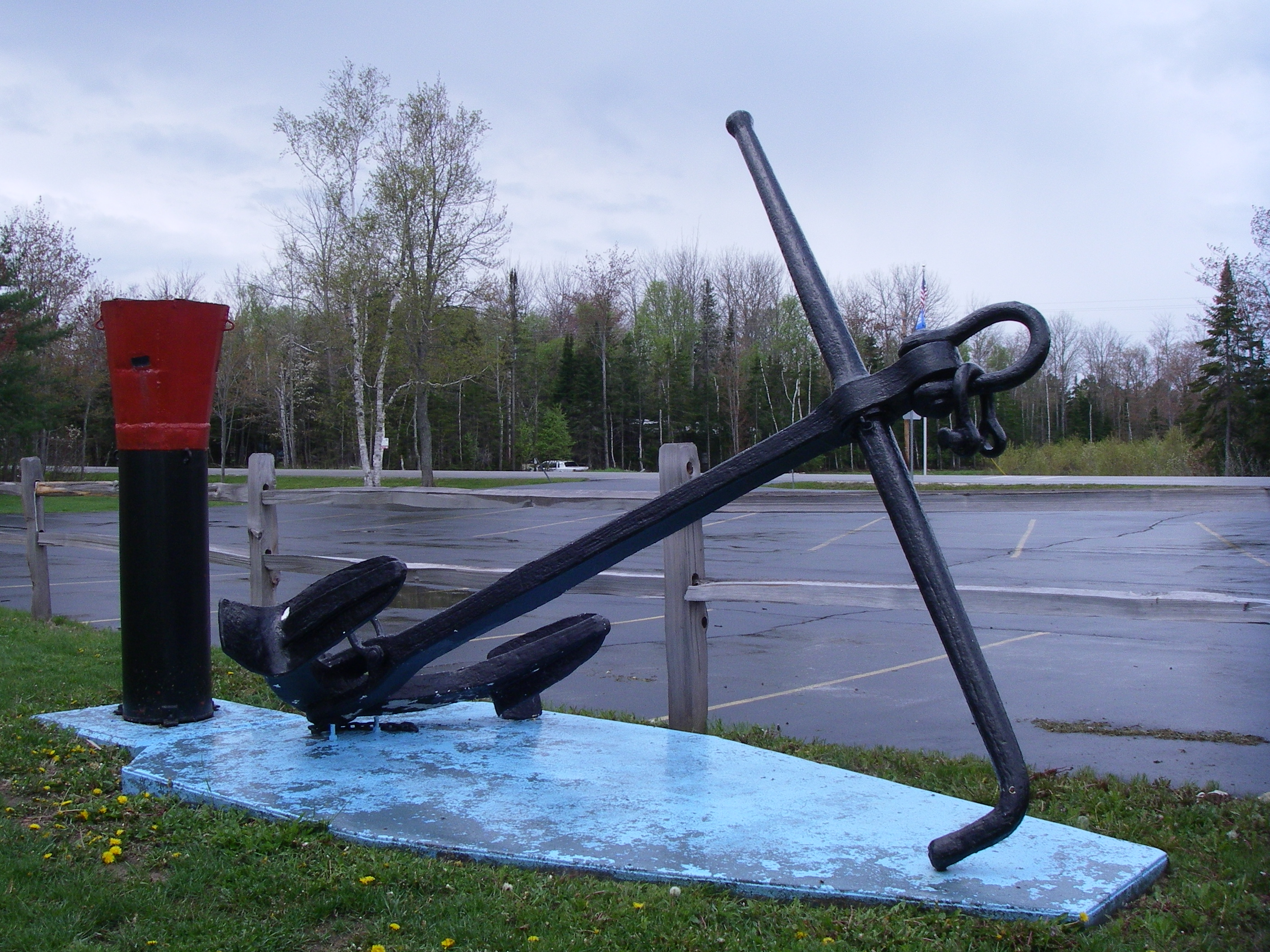
Anchor and windlass from M.M. Drake (1882) displayed next to Whitefish Township Community Building

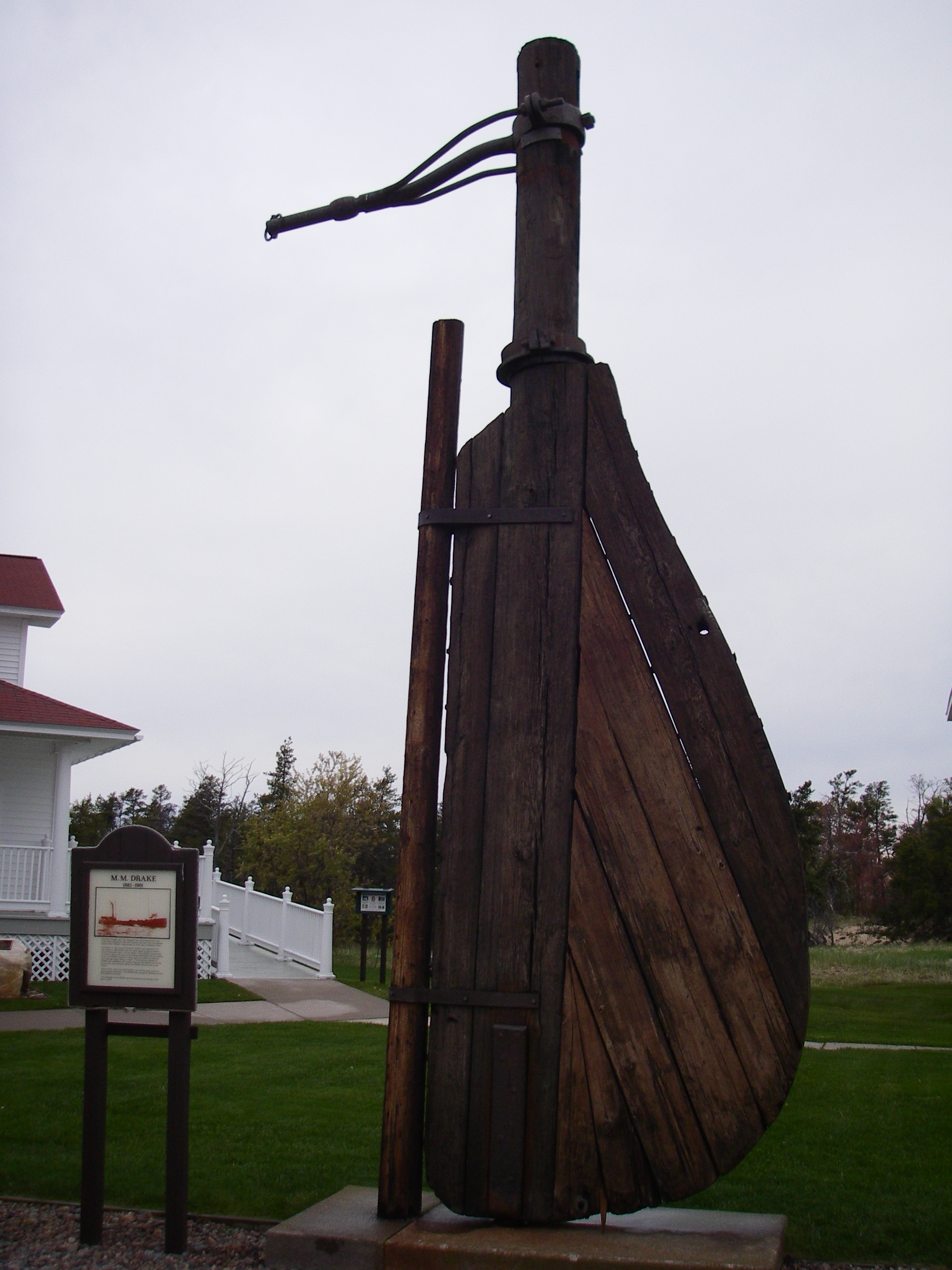
Rudder from M.M. Drake (1882) displayed at Whitefish Point

The schooner-barge Michigan was never seen again after the night of 2 October 1901. The wreck of Drake was first discovered by Captain Campbell of Liberty just four days after she sank on 6 October 1901, when he was downbound for the Soo Locks. Captain Campbell reported that Drake was located between Vermilion Point and Whitefish Point lying on her side in 40 feet (12 m) of water with about 5 feet (1.5 m) feet of water over her with a floating spar still strung to the hull. The wreck of Drake lay forgotten on the bottom of Lake Superior for 77 years until she was rediscovered at 46°46.588′N 85°05.933′W in 1978, by the Great Lakes Shipwreck Historical Society (GLSHS) who subsequently illegally removed her rudder, windlass, anchor, and a sign board in the 1980s. Michigan's Antiquities Act of 1980 prohibited the removal of artifacts from shipwrecks on the Great Lakes bottomlands. The Evening News reported a Michigan Department of Natural Resources and Environment 1992 raid on the Great Lakes Shipwreck Museum and its offices that found evidence of 150 artifacts illegally removed from the state-claimed bottomlands, including artifacts from Drake. Following a settlement agreement with the GLSHS, Drake's rudder, anchor, and windlass are now the property of the State of Michigan. The rudder is on loan to the GLSHS for display nearby the Great Lakes Shipwreck Museum and the anchor and windlass is on loan to Whitefish Township for display next to its community building.

Great Lakes diver Harrington reported that Drake's wreck lies scattered on the lake bottom about 0.5 miles (0.80 km) from Vermilion Point. Oleszewski reported that decades of winter ice and spring and fall storms smashed the remains of her upright keel leaving only the boiler standing. The Drake's wreck site is protected for future generations of recreational divers by the Whitefish Point Underwater Preserve as part of an underwater museum. Divers who visit the wreck sites are expected to observe preservation laws and "take nothing but pictures and leave nothing but bubbles". Harrington cautions that "divers must be certain of their abilities and equipment" when diving the Whitefish Point Underwater Preserve.

== See also ==
- Graveyard of the Great Lakes
