= SS Vienna =

Six merchant ships have been named Vienna.

- Vienna, a pre-1819 American sloop.
- Vienna, a schooner built in 1866, Canadian.
- Vienna, a schooner built in 1871, Official No. C950558.
- SS Vienna (1873), a bulk freighter built in 1873, Official No. US25875.
- SS Vienna (1894) a Great Eastern Railway ferry
- SS Vienna (1929), a London and North Eastern Railway passenger ship built in 1929 by John Brown & Company, Clydebank
