= SS Indiana (1848) =

Freighter wrecked in Lake Superior

Coordinates: 46.757°N 85.261°W

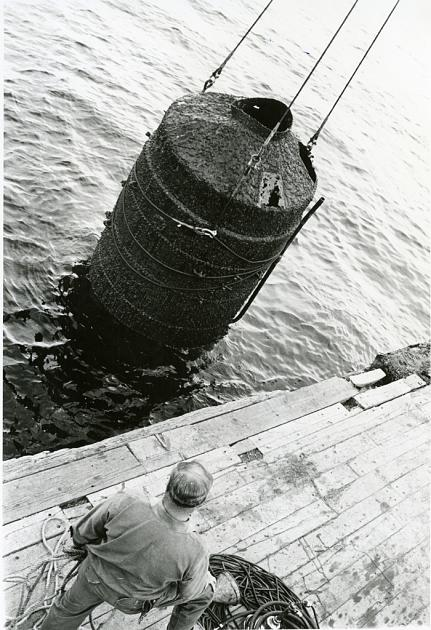
The boiler from the SS Indiana being pulled from Lake Superior in 1979.

SS Indiana was a freighter built in 1848. It was built with an 18-foot steam engine with an Erickson Screw Propeller. It served Lake Superior as a passenger ship and later became a transporter for iron ore after the opening of the Soo Locks. During a storm, the boat started leaking near the propeller shaft, causing the ship to founder at Crisp Point Light on June 6, 1856. It was carrying iron ore from Marquette, Michigan during the time of its accident.

In 1979, the Smithsonian Institution, the United States Army Corps of Engineers and the United States Navy salvaged the steam engine from Lake Superior. The engine and related artifacts are held in the collection of the National Museum of American History.

== See also ==
- Graveyard of the Great Lakes
