= Whitefish Point Underwater Preserve =

Reserve to protect and conserve shipwrecks and historical resources in Lake Superior

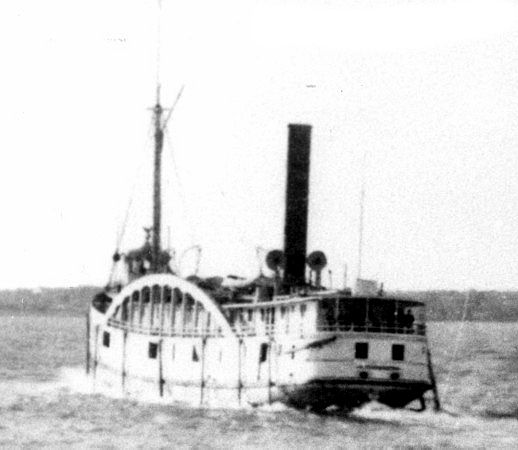
- The Comet under sail. The only known treasure ship of Lake Superior, she sank in 1875 with 70 tons of silver ore.

- Location within Michigan
- Location: Lake Superior, Chippewa County, Luce County, Michigan USA
- Nearest city: Emerson, Michigan
- Coordinates: 46.7772°N 84.951°W
- Area: 376 square miles (970 km^{2})
- Established: 1987
- Governing body: Michigan Department of Natural Resources

The Whitefish Point Underwater Preserve was established in 1987 to protect and conserve shipwrecks and historical resources on 376 square miles (970 km^{2}) of Lake Superior bottomlands in Whitefish Bay and around Whitefish Point, Michigan. The formation of the Michigan Underwater Preserves helped stop controversy over artifact removal from shipwrecks of this area. The preserve is now known for deep, well preserved shipwrecks in clear water accessible to scuba divers with technical skill and experience. The preserve is one of the last places in the Great Lakes to observe shipwrecks without zebra mussel encrustation.

== History ==
Shipwrecks along the southern Lake Superior coast known as the "Graveyard of the Great Lakes" dramatically increased after the first lock on the St. Marys River opened this coastline to shipping in 1855. Every vessel entering or leaving Lake Superior must pass Whitefish Point. The Whitefish Point Light first established in 1849 is arguably the most important light on Lake Superior. More vessels have been lost in the Whitefish Point area than any other part of Lake Superior. Between the loss of the Invincible in 1816 and the sinking of the SS Edmund Fitzgerald in 1975, the Whitefish Point area has claimed at least 240 ships. Vessels are funneled through Whitefish Bay downbound and upbound from the Soo Locks. Poor visibility from forest fire smoke, snow squalls, and Lake Superior's notorious fogs had deadly consequences with the traffic congestion. Lake Superior's 160 miles (260 km) of open water and storms from the northwest can build immense seas with offshore waves of 30 feet (9.1 m) or more. Such a storm sank the SS Edmund Fitzgerald 17 miles (27 km) from Whitefish Point in 1975.

Sport diver Harrington reported that many of the shipwrecks of the Whitefish Point Underwater Preserve were "stripped of important artifacts in the 1970s and early 1980s. The State of Michigan filed a lawsuit against the Great Lakes Shipwreck Historical Society (GLSHS) for illegal removal of artifacts from Great Lakes bottomlands. The Michigan Department of Natural Resources (DNR) obtained a search warrant in 1992 and raided on the GLSHS's offices and Great Lakes Shipwreck Museum. The DNR found evidence the Shipwreck Society had:

...removed about 150 artifacts from wrecks located on state-claimed bottomlands. … Shipwreck Society official [Tom Farnquist] described the Society's actions as a kind of "damned if you do, damned if you don't" puzzle. By preserving the artifacts for display at the Whitefish Point Museum, Farnquist reasoned the Society was really doing the state's job for the DNR. DNR officer Carl TerHaar challenged Farnquist's line of reasoning however. "The story we get is, 'We're taking stuff before somebody else does.' That's a never-ending excuse … saying we'll take it before the next guy does. That's like looting in the L.A. riots," TerHaar commented.

Many of the artifacts removed from shipwrecks by the GLSHS without permits are displayed at the Great Lakes Shipwreck Museum at Whitefish Point by a settlement agreement with the state of Michigan. The sport diving community raised a furious outcry over the disparity of special treatment for the museum divers who received no criminal prosecution while individual sport divers were prosecuted freely during the late 1980s and 1990s for removal of artifacts from shipwrecks. To this day many sport divers boycott the Great Lakes Shipwreck Museum.

== Preserve formation ==
The Whitefish Point Underwater Preserve was established in 1987 to protect some of the region's most sensitive underwater natural and cultural resources with the central objective to provide enhanced management of shipwrecks. The Whitefish Point Underwater Preserve is administered through the Michigan Department of Environmental Quality Submerged Lands Program and the Michigan Department of History, Arts and Libraries of the Michigan Historical Center.

Scuba divers and history enthusiasts now help ensure the integrity of the preserve which is considered an underwater museum.

== Features ==
Many of the twenty-three known shipwrecks lying in depths from 30 feet (9.1 m) to 270 feet (82 m) are moored to protect the wrecks and enhance the safety of divers. The preserve has good visibility and offers deep water diving on a variety of shipwrecks. The preserve is one of the last places in the Great Lakes to observe shipwrecks without zebra mussel encrustation. Dry suits are recommended due to cold temperatures and unprotected coves or bays. Most of the dive sites are deep and divers must be certain of their ability and their equipment before they attempt to dive in this preserve.

Whitefish Point Underwater Preserve Shipwrecks
Site name	Type	Depth	Coordinates	Disaster History
Allegheny	Wood schooner	30 feet (9 m)	46°46.016′N 85°10.601′W	Stranded at Crisp Point in a gale on 6 June 1913. Crew rescued by Vermilion Point Life-saving Station crew with no loss of life.
Comet	Wood propeller steamer tug	200 feet (61 m) to 230 feet (70 m)	46°43.02′N 84°52.00′W	Sank 26 August 1875 after colliding with the Manitoba above Whitefish Point with the loss of ten lives.
John B. Cowle	Steel propeller bulk freighter	170 feet (52 m) to 200 feet (61 m)	46°44.435′N 84°57.877′W	Sank 12 July 1909 in Whitefish Bay after colliding with the Isaac M. Scott with the loss of fourteen lives out of a twenty-four-man crew.
Drake	Wood propeller bulk freighter	40 feet (12 m) to 50 feet (15 m)	46°46.588′N 85°05.933′W	Foundered 2 October 1901 off Vermilion Point, along with her tow, the schooner, Michigan. Crew of both vessels were rescued by the propellers Northern Wave and Superior City with no loss of life.
Eureka	Wood schooner barge	50 feet (15 m) to 55 feet (17 m)	46°50.15′N 85°10.76′W	Disappeared 20 October 1886 after separating from the steamer Prentice 5.0 miles (8.0 km) off Vermillion Point with the loss of all 6 crew members.
Indiana	Wooden schooner barge	100 feet (30 m) to 115 feet (35 m)	46°48.66′N 085°17.16′W	Sank 6 June 1858 40 miles (64 km)above Whitefish Point and 10.0 miles (16.1 km) from shore with the crew of twenty-one taking to the life boats before she sank.
Jupiter	Wooden schooner barge			Driven ashore near Vermilion Point 27 November 1872 in an arctic gale when the towline parted from steamer John A. Dix and the schooner Saturn.
Samuel Mather	Wooden propeller	140 feet (43 m) to 170 feet (52 m)	46°34.308′N 084°42.325′W	Sank 21 November 1891 in a collision with the Brazil in off Point Iroquois in Whitefish Bay with no loss of life.
John Mitchell	Steel freighter	120 feet (37 m) to 150 feet (46 m)	46°50.05′N 85°04.81′W	Sank 10 July 1911 off Whitefish Point in a collision with William Henry Mack with the loss of three lives.
Miztec	Wooden schooner barge	45 feet (14 m) to 55 feet (17 m)	46°48.073′N 85°04.500′W	Foundered 13 May 1921 off Vermilion Point with the loss of all seven crew.
Myron	Wooden propeller, lumber hooker	45' to 55'	46°48.463′N 85°01.646′W	Foundered 1.5 miles (2.4 km) west of Whitefish Point on 23 November 1919 with barge Miztec in tow. Seventeen lives were lost from the Myron. Only the Captain survived. He was picked up by the W.C. Franz when he was found drifting on wreckage near Ile Parisienne.
Neshoto	Wood propeller	45 feet (14 m) to 55 feet (17 m)		Blinded from forest fire smoke, driven ashore and stranded 2.5 miles (4.0 km) east of Crisp Point Light, crew rescued by Crisp Point Life Saving Crew.
Niagara	Wood schooner barge	90 feet (27 m) to 100 feet (30 m)	46°49.173′N 85°07.488′W	Foundered 7 Sep 1887 after breaking tow from the steamer Australasia 7 miles (11 km) northwest of Whitefish Point Light. All hands, 9 lives, lost.
Alexander Nimick	Wood propeller	100 feet (30 m)	46°45.743′N 85°12.982′W	Pounded to pieces in 27 feet (8 m) of water on 21 September 1907 after she was stranded on a sandbar near the mouth of the Two Hearted River with the loss of 6 lives. The 11 survivors made it to shore by lifeboat.
Ora Endress S. S.	Fish tug	13 feet (4 m) to 15 feet (5 m)		Capsized and sank about 1 mile (1.6 km) west of Whitefish Point. The Whitefish Point lighthouse keeper and 2 other men rescued all 11 crewmembers.
John M. Osborn	Wooden propeller	165 feet (50 m)	46°51.974′N 85°05.210′W	Sank 27 July 1884 in a collision with the Alberta 6 miles (9.7 km) west-northwest of Whitefish Point with the loss of 3 lives.
Panther	Wood propeller	90 feet (27 m) to 110 feet (34 m)	46°38.301′N 84°48.370′W	Sank 26 June 1916 in a collision in a fog with the James H. Hill off Parisienne Island in Whitefish Bay with no loss of life.
Sadie Thompson	Wooden barge	80 feet (24 m) to 114 feet (35 m)	46°42.512′N 84°59.856′W	Broke free and sank 1 mile (1.6 km) south of Whitefish Point during the construction of the Harbor of Refuge in 1967.
Sagamore	Whaleback barge	45 feet (14 m) to 65 feet (20 m)	46°31.085′N 84°37.935′W	Sank 29 July 1901 in a collision with propeller Northern Queen near Point Iroquois in Whitefish Bay with the loss of 2 lives.
Saturn	Wood schooner barge	20 feet (6 m)	46°45.952′N 85°01.547′W	Pounded to pieces 27 November 1872 after grounding just west of Whitefish Point after breaking her towline with steam John A. Dix and sister Jupiter with the loss of 7 lives.
Superior City	Steel freighter	190 feet (58 m) to 270 feet (82 m)	46°43.51′N 84°52.37′W	Sank 20 August 1920 after her boilers exploded in a collision with steamer Willis L. King with the loss of 29 lives.
Vienna	Wood propeller	120 feet (37 m) to 148 feet (45 m)	46°44.46′N 84°57.91′W	Sank 17 September 1873 after a collision with propeller Nipigon about 4 miles (6.4 km) below Whitefish Point with no loss of life.
Zillah	Wood propeller	230 feet (70 m) to 250 feet (76 m)	46°43.75′N 84°54.97′W	Foundered 4 miles (6.4 km) off Whitefish Point 29 August 1926. Her crew of 14 were rescued by the U.S. Coast Guard and the William B. Schiller.

== See also ==
- Michigan Underwater Preserves
