= SS Samuel Mather (1887) =

U.S. merchant ship that sank in Lake Superior

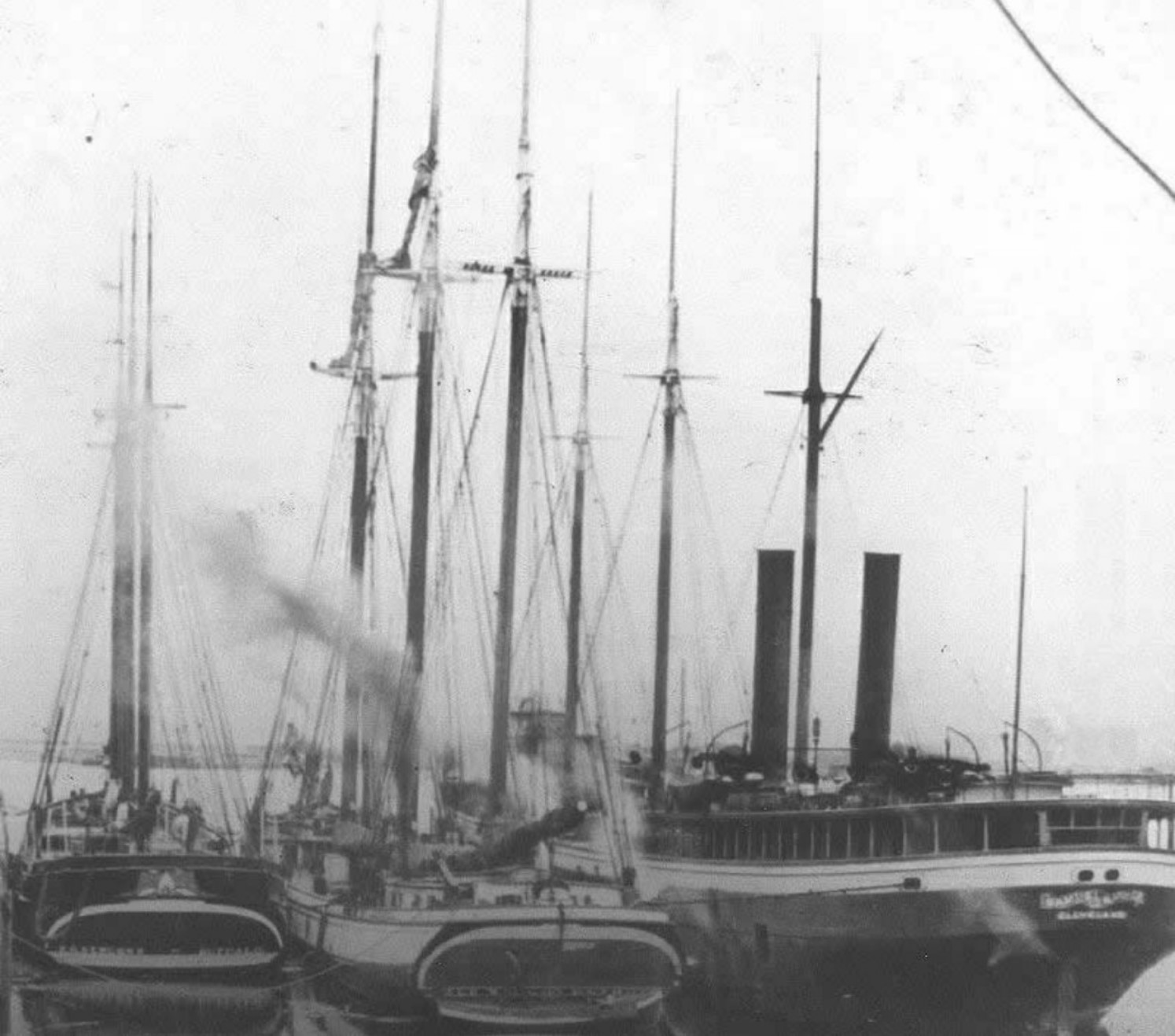
- SS Samuel Mather (far right) at dock

History

United States
- Name: Samuel Mather
- Namesake: Samuel Livingston Mather II
- Owner: Pickands, Mather Company
- Port of registry: (United States) Cleveland, Ohio
- Builder: Quayle's, Thomas Sons
- Completed: 1887
- Fate: Sank in Whitefish Bay 21 November 1891 after colliding with the Brazil
- Notes: Official No. 116142

General characteristics
- Class & type: Bulk freighter
- Tonnage: 1,576.23 GRT; 1,286.72 NRT
- Length: 246 ft (75 m)
- Beam: 40 ft (12 m)
- Depth: 19.3 ft (5.9 m)
- Propulsion: Steam, propeller

SS Samuel Mather was the first of seven U.S. merchant ships to bear that name. The wooden Samuel Mather sank in 1891 after she was rammed by the steel freighter Brazil in heavy fog in Whitefish Bay 8 miles (13 km) from Point Iroquois, ending the Samuel Mather's 4-year career. Her intact wreck is a rare of example of wooden freighters that plied the Great Lakes and she is a popular scuba diving site. Although there was no loss of life when the Samuel Mather sank, her wreck claimed the lives of three scuba divers more than 100 years after she sank. Artifacts from her wreck were illegally removed in the 1980s by the Great Lakes Shipwreck Historical Society. The artifacts are now the property of the State of Michigan and are on display as a loan to the Great Lakes Shipwreck Museum. The wreck of the Samuel Mather is protected as part of an underwater museum in the Whitefish Point Underwater Preserve.

== Career ==
Shipwreck historian Frederick Stonehouse wrote, "The Mather is a rare example of a type of freighter that has long since disappeared from the Great Lakes." The 246 feet (75 m) steamer was constructed with wood and had two boilers and two masts.

The Samuel Mather had a series of mishaps and changes in ownerships after she was launched in Cleveland on 7 April 1887 for her first owners, R. John W. Moore, et al. On 20 October 1887 when she was bound from Sandusky, Ohio to Duluth, Minnesota, the tug Mystic towed her to Sault Ste. Marie, Michigan with disabled machinery. On 9 May 1888, she was sold to Samuel Livingston Mather II, et al. of Cleveland, Ohio. On 11 August 1888, she was damaged in a heavy gale near Detour, Michigan and later repaired in Cleveland. On 13 April 1889, she was sold to James Pickard, et al. of Interlake Transportation Company. In June 1889, she towed the Senator and the Winana. On 30 September 1890, she was libeled for sinking the steamer Ohio. The Samuel Mather was a coal-carrying steamer but she "perished with an abnormal cargo of wheat".

== Final voyage ==
On 22 November 1891 at 2:00 am, the wooden Samuel Mather was downbound from Duluth, Minnesota for Buffalo, New York with a load of 58,000 bushels of wheat when she was rammed on the starboard side near the aft hatch by the steel package freighter Brazil in a thick, heavy fog in Whitefish Bay 8 miles (13 km) north of Point Iroquois. The collision made an 11-foot (3.4 m) hole on her starboard side. There was no loss of life from the crew of twenty. During the 25 minutes that it took her to sink, her crew were able to pull away with her life boats but they lost all of their personal possessions. The crew was picked up by the Brazil and were later transferred to the steamer Parks Foster for transport to Sault Ste. Marie, Michigan. The Brazil proceeded to Duluth with her load of coal and was found to have 3 frames and a stringer broken from the collision. The Samuel Mather was valued at $50,000 and with her wheat cargo, the total loss was estimated in excess of $226,000.

== Wreck history ==
Painting of the wreck as it appeared in 2006

The Samuel Mather's wreck was discovered in May 1978 by Bob Smith of Sault Ste. Marie, Michigan and has been extensively filmed by the Great Lakes Shipwreck Historical Society (GLSHS). Shipwreck historian Janice Gerred reported that the Great Lakes Shipwreck Historical Society took the Samuel Mather's artifacts for preservation to display in the Great Lakes Shipwreck Museum. However, Michigan’s Antiquities Act of 1980 prohibited the removal of artifacts from shipwrecks on the Great Lakes bottomlands. The Michigan Department of Natural Resources and Environment 1992 raid on the GLSHS offices and Great Lakes Shipwreck Museum included seizure of artifacts that were illegally removed from the Samuel Mather in the 1980s. Artifacts from the Mather's wreck are on display in the Great Lakes Shipwreck Museum as a loan from the State of Michigan by a 1993 settlement agreement with the GLSHS following the DNR raid on the museum in 1992. The Samuel Mather's wreck is now protected by the Whitefish Point Underwater Preserve as part of an underwater museum.

Stonehouse wrote that wreck of " the Mather is one of the best known examples a wooden freighter still available for examination." The Mather is a popular wreck site for scuba diving as she sits upright with an intact deck and mostly intact stern superstructure. Overall, she is in very good condition, likely because she sank slowly enough for pressures to equalize. The wreck of the Mather lies at 46°34.308′N 084°42.325′W. Her mast can be reached at 75 feet, her deck at 155 feet, and the bottom at 180 feet. Although the Mather is not the deepest dive in the Whitefish Point Underwater Preserve, she claimed the life of three scuba divers, one in 1998 and one in 1999, and the third in 2012. Great Lakes diver Harrington cautions that "divers must be certain of their abilities and equipment" when diving the Whitefish Point Underwater Preserve.
