= Great Lakes Shipwreck Museum =

- U.S. National Register of Historic Places
- Michigan State Historic Site
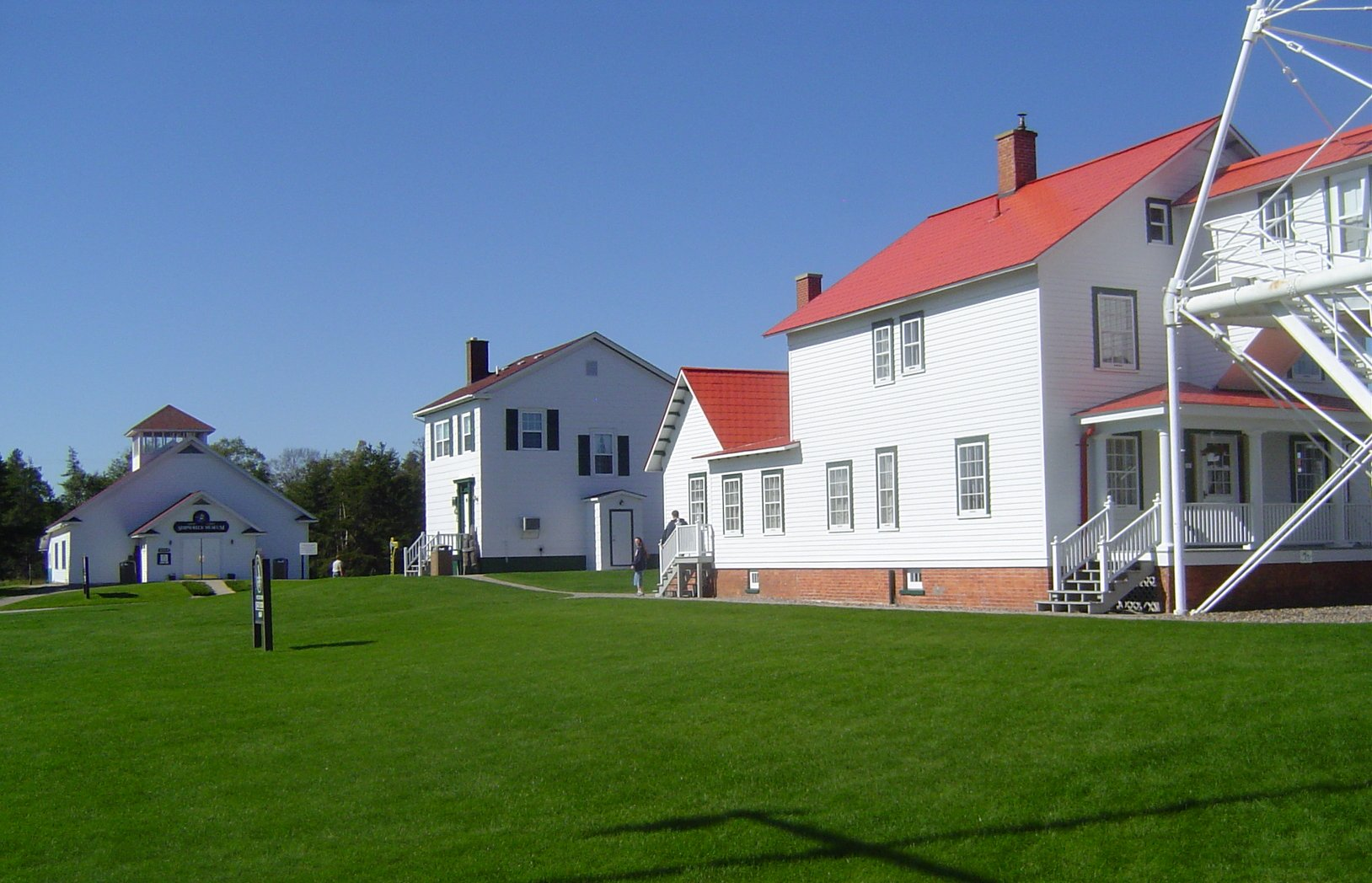
- Great Lakes Shipwreck Museum complex

- Location within Michigan Location within the United States
- Location: Whitefish Point Light
- Nearest city: Shelldrake, Michigan
- Coordinates: 46°46′14″N 84°57′24″W
- Area: 8.27 acres (3.35 ha)
- Built: 1985
- Architectural style: Iron pile lighthouse
- NRHP reference No.: 73000947

Significant dates
- Added to NRHP: February 28, 1973
- Designated MSHS: February 22, 1974

The Great Lakes Shipwreck Museum is located at the Whitefish Point Light Station 11 miles (18 km) north of Paradise in Chippewa County in the U.S. state of Michigan. The light station property was transferred to the Great Lakes Shipwreck Historical Society (GLSHS), the Michigan Audubon Society (MAS), and the United States Fish and Wildlife Service (USFWS) in 1996. The three entities share governance of the site. The museum is operated by the GLSHS. The museum exhibits artifacts from shipwrecks from the Whitefish Point Underwater Preserve and the bell from the wreck of the SS Edmund Fitzgerald. Admission to the museum includes a tour of historic buildings with displays that interpret the Great Lakes maritime, United States Coast Guard, and US Life-Saving Service history.

== History ==
=== Whitefish Point stakeholders ===
An active navigational light has operated at Whitefish Point since 1848. The United States Coast Guard (USCG) stationed personnel at Whitefish Point until 1971 when the navigational equipment was automated. Whitefish Township was successful in its bid to place the Whitefish Point light, the oldest active light on Lake Superior, on National Register of Historic Places in 1973.

The MAS secured a license from the Coast Guard in 1976 for access to the Whitefish Point Light Station property for the study of migrating birds. In 1978, the Whitefish Point Bird Observatory (WPBO) was formed as an affiliate of the MAS and began monitoring migrating birds at Whitefish Point.

The GLSHS was formed by a group of divers in 1978 as a private, nonprofit organization. Its mission is "to promote and augment an understanding and appreciation of maritime history with particular emphasis on the Great Lakes museum facilities." In 1983, the GLSHS obtained a 25-year lease from the United States Coast Guard (USCG) to operate a museum at the Whitefish Point Light Station. The GLSHS began obtaining public funds in 1984 from federal and state agencies.

=== Pre-transfer from Coast Guard ===
In 1990, the GLSHS signed an agreement with Whitefish Township that gave residents and visitors public access to Lake Superior, parking, and the restrooms at Whitefish Point.

In 1992, the state of Michigan filed a lawsuit against the GLSHS for removal of artifacts from shipwrecks on the Great Lakes bottomlands in violation of Michigan's Antiquities Act of 1980. The Michigan Department of Natural Resources (DNR) obtained a search warrant in 1992 and raided the GLSHS offices and museum and found evidence that GLSHS had "removed about 150 artifacts from wrecks located on state-claimed bottomlands." In 1993, the state reached a settlement agreement with the GLSHS that loaned the artifacts back to them for display in the Great Lakes Shipwreck Museum.

In 1992, the stakeholders at the former Whitefish Point Light Station developed the Whitefish Point Comprehensive Plan. The stakeholders included Whitefish Township, the MAS, DNR, GLSHS, and USCG. The plan was developed with the purpose of discussion of land transfer of the Whitefish Point Light Station from the USCG and "proper land usage in terms of existing and future developments... to ensure that, through proper planning, the unique but somewhat fragile environment of the Coast Guard Site is fully protected."

In 1993, the GLSHS announced their intentions to seek a legislative transfer from the USCG so that they could hold 3 acres (1.2 ha) of the 44 acres (18 ha) of the Whitefish Point Light Station. In 1994, the GLSHS was involved in the removal of trees and the construction of an overflow parking lot. This led to a public meeting that discussed concerns about overdevelopment of the former light station.

On March 31, 1995, the GLSHS announced their intention to build "a new museum wing dedicated to Fitzgerald memorabilia."

On July 4, 1995, the GLSHS participated in the salvage of the bell from the wreck of the SS Edmund Fitzgerald. Experts at Michigan State University spent hundreds of hours conserving the bell and applying a protective coating. GLSHS's decision to have the protective coating stripped off and the bell shined was controversial. The bell became the centerpiece in the Great Lakes Shipwreck Museum as a memorial to the Fitzgerald crewmembers and all lost mariners. The GLSHS was involved in controversy again when it announced plans to take the Fitzgerald bell on a touring exhibition. GLSHS dropped its effort after family members of the Fitzgerald crew objected to using the bell as a "traveling trophy."

In 1996, GLSHS published their plans "to secure approval for controlled new construction at Whitefish Point... [to] include expansion of the Shipwreck Museum and a new building for the Shipwreck Coast Gift Shop."

=== Transfer from Coast Guard ===
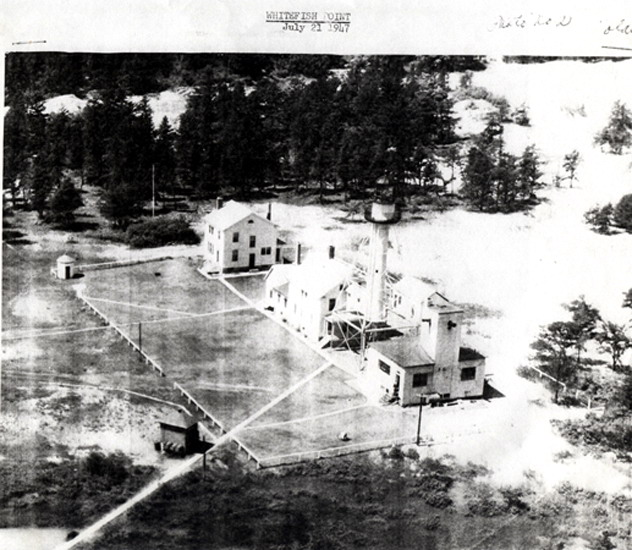
Aerial view of the Whitefish Point Light Station on July 21, 1947.

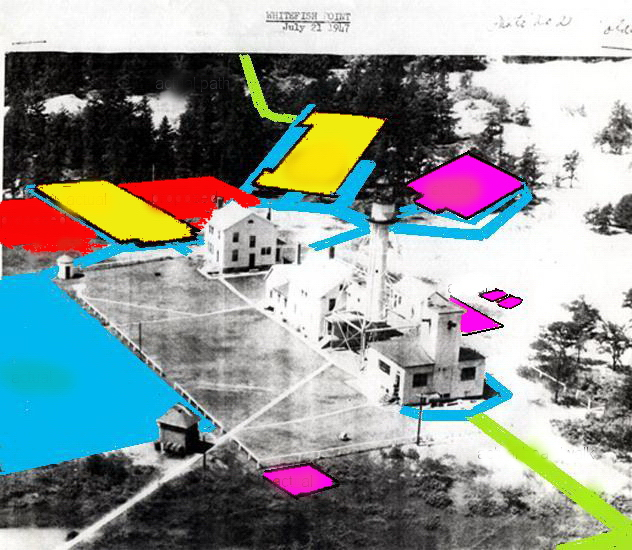
Colored areas are added to 1947 photograph to indicate changes to the site since 1983 - red denotes proposed museum wings.

In 1995, the MAS and WPBO took a public stand calling for the transfer of the entire Whitefish Point Light Station to the USFWS. U.S. Rep. Bart Stupak authored transfer legislation for the Whitefish Point Light Station that included "a reversionary clause which would stipulate that the property would revert to the Coast Guard if not used appropriately." The USFWS's request to Stupak for the transfer of the light station was made public with assurances that no changes would be made to the GLSHS museum operation. A group called the Friends of Whitefish Point organized over their opposition of overdevelopment and private ownership of the light station property. They presented a petition with 1,600 signatures to Stupak that supported the transfer of the entire light station property to USFWS. In 1995, Stupak announced that he hadn't made a final decision, saying, "To tell those people [GLSHS] they can no longer run their museum because Fish and Wildlife wants it would be wrong." Stupak maintained that the transfer legislation would not go "before a committee or the house floor with disagreement among the affected parties."

After Stupak's earlier support to transfer of all of Whitefish Point Light Station property to GLSHS, he introduced a bill in 1996 that would transfer to the land to the GLSHS, WPBO, and USFWS. The Michigan Department of Natural Resources requested that "the legislation be rewritten to remove authorization to expand the gift shop and other facilities." The Michigan State Historic Preservation Office (SHPO) objected to Stupak's bill that allowed "'unchecked development' in violation of the National Historic Preservation Act."

The Coast Guard Authorization Act of 1996 was enacted that gave the Coast Guard the authority to convey the Whitefish Point Lighthouse property to the stakeholders. The Coast Guard transferred a 8.27 acres (3.35 ha) parcel to the GLSHS for the interpretation of maritime history. The GLSHS parcel included all but one of the historic structures at Whitefish Point. The WPBO received 2.69 acres (1.09 ha) for research. The USFWS received 33 acres (13 ha) to be managed as part of the Seney National Wildlife Refuge. The stakeholders were issued land patents in 1998 and again in 2000 to correct an error in the original patents.

The transfer legislation requires that each recipient maintain their parcel in accordance with the National Historic Preservation Act of 1966 and other applicable laws. The statute stipulates that development or expansion at the Whitefish Point Light requires written consent by the stakeholders, that full consideration is given to public comment, and it is "consistent with preservation of the Property in its predominantly natural, scenic, historic, and forested condition"

=== Events leading to Human Use/Natural Resource Management Plan for Whitefish Point ===
On November 1, 1998, the GLSHS announced their plans for the Great Lakes mariners project as "a carefully planned expansion for the museum's facilities". They planned two new wings for the museum with one wing featuring a theater and 125-seat lecture hall and "multi-purpose building... to house restrooms, inventory, larger sales area, and administrative offices."

The GLSHS constructed a 5,201 sq ft (483.2 m^{2}) gift-shop/office building in 1999 that would become known as the multi-purpose building. The size of the building exceeded the largest historic structure on the site by more than 2,000 sq ft (190 m^{2}). In November 2000, MAS filed a lawsuit against the GLSHS and USFWS. The lawsuit accused the GLSHS of overdeveloping the Whitefish Point Light Station in violation of its federal land patent and the USFWS of not protecting the site. The lawsuit was dismissed in 2001 when the parties arrived at a settlement agreement that appointed a mediator to negotiate the Human Use/Natural Resource Management Plan for Whitefish Point to regulate land use and any development at Whitefish Point. MAS acknowledged the museum's growth was not the sole cause of Whitefish Point's popularity that drew many visitors for sunbathing and ship watching. GLSHS agreed there must be a limit to development at Whitefish Point although it still intended to build museum wings.

In August 2002, a petition to recall the Whitefish Township supervisor placed "GLSHS at the center of local controversy". The Township Board of Trustees resolved the controversy on September 5, 2002 by accepting the supervisor's resignation and "disassociating the township from a scheme to convert 1,300 feet (400 m) of wilderness Lake Superior lakeshore into a Shipwreck Museum cruise ship landing."

GLSHS filed a lawsuit against the mediator and MAS on September 24, 2002 claiming breach of contract because SHPO was brought into the planning process at Whitefish Point. GLSHS claimed private property rights and therefore, SHPO had no authority to regulate development on the historic parcel they held by federal patent.

The legislation that transferred the light station property to the stakeholder required "a reasonable opportunity for public comment on... development or expansion, and full consideration has been given to such public comment". The stakeholders and the court appointed mediator, Jim Lively of the Michigan Land Use Institute, held public hearings on the new management plan for Whitefish Point on December 3, 2002. Prior to receiving public comment, Lively summarized the plan by explaining that it allowed two new wings for the Great Lakes Shipwreck Museum, would greatly alter the current parking areas by returning part of it to natural habitat, and would restrict people to trails. The public comments at the hearing were "fairly evenly matched... with the employees and board members of GLSHS supporting the plan and the residents and property owners of Whitefish Township primarily entering the official record in opposition." Reasons for opposition to plan included "increased foot and vehicular traffic, possible habitat loss, septic system monitoring, parking issues, building expansion, new construction, and possible contamination from lead, mercury, and other pollutants."

GLSHS lawsuit was dismissed on December 19, 2002 after all three stakeholders signed the mediated Human Use/Natural Resource Plan that secured SHPO's involvement at Whitefish Point. The new plan replaced the 1992 Comprehensive Plan for Whitefish Point. The GLSHS, MAS, and USFWS comprise the Whitefish Point Joint Committee that governs Whitefish Point through the Management Plan with USFWS having final oversight as stipulated in the transfer legislation.

== Museum complex ==
Since 1984, the GLSHS was awarded numerous grants used to restore or renovate historic buildings at Whitefish Point Light Station for the interpretation of Great Lakes maritime, USCG, and US Life-Saving Service history. The museum complex includes both the modern and historic structures, many of which may be toured with the purchase of museum admission.

=== Modern structures ===
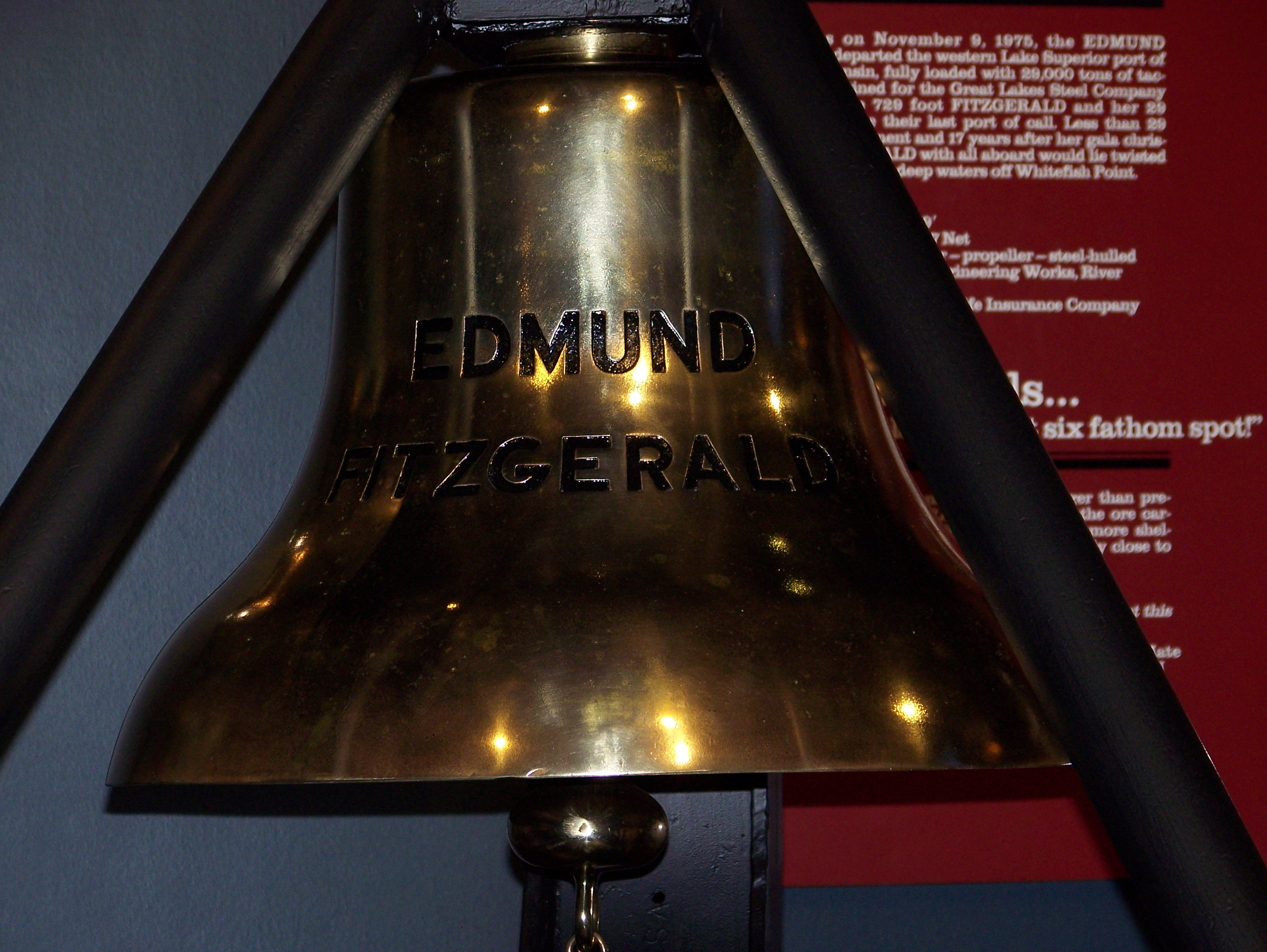
The bell from the SS Edmund Fitzgerald on display at the Great Lakes Shipwreck Museum

Museum: the GLSHS opened its first museum exhibits to the public in 1985. In 1986, the society secured funds and constructed the Great Lakes Shipwreck Museum. The museum is the second largest building at Whitefish Point. The museum features artifacts retrieved from local shipwrecks, including the bell from the SS Edmund Fitzgerald. The museum displays artifacts loaned from the state of Michigan from the following wrecks in the Whitefish Point Underwater Preserve: the Comet, John B. Cowle, Drake, Samuel Mather, Miztec, Myron, Niagara, John M. Osborn, Sagamore, Superior City, and Vienna.

Gift Shop Building/Administrative Building: this is the largest building at Whitefish Point, constructed in 1999 by the GLSHS. The main level is used as a GLSHS gift shop, the lower level has public restrooms, and the upper level is used for GLSHS offices.

=== Historic structures ===
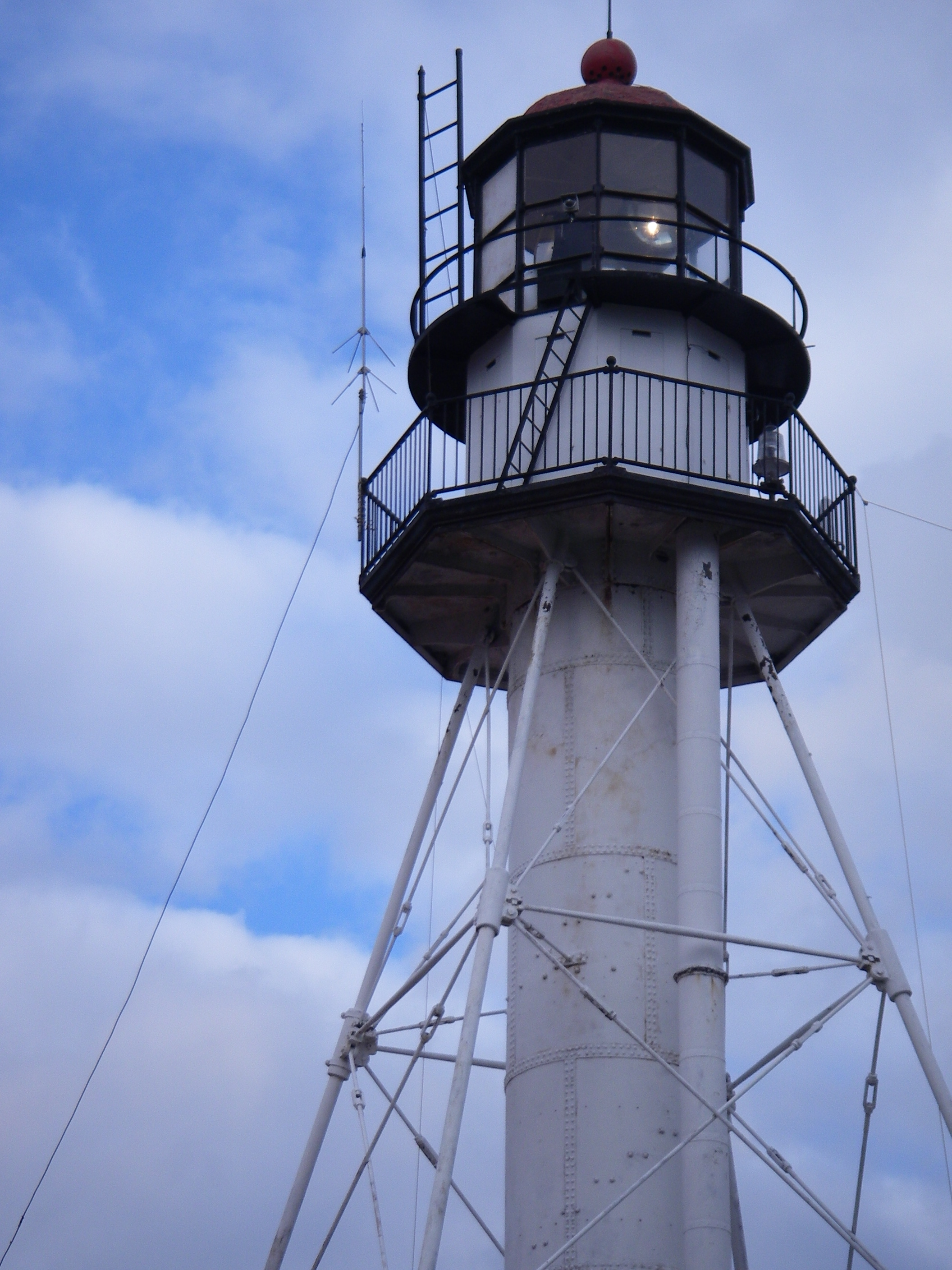
Whitefish Point light tower in 2007 before start of restoration

Light tower: the first light tower was built with stone in 1848 and its lens used whale oil to produce a light. The stone tower proved inadequate against Lake Superior's storms. In 1861, the stone tower was replaced with the present steel tower by the order of President Lincoln. Over the years the light had several different lens. The Crouse & Hinds aerobeacon lens installed in 1968 was replaced in 2011 with a light-emitting diode (LED) lantern with a reduced range of 15 nautical miles (28 km).

The GLSHS renewed a historic preservation easement with Michigan's SHPO and was awarded $40,000 Michigan Lighthouse Assistance grants in 2008 and 2010 to strip the paint from the 150-year-old tower, conduct lead paint abatement, and prime and repaint the tower. The GLSHS projects completion of light tower painting project in 2011. The Whitefish Point light was automated in 1971 but remains an active aid to navigation. Because of this, museum visitors are not able to enter the lighthouse itself, although touring the adjoining lightkeeper’s quarters is included in the museum fee.

Fog signal building: the original fog signal building was destroyed in a storm in 1935. The building was replaced with a brick structure in 1937. It was used to house steam boilers, clock timing apparatus, radio equipment, diesel generators, and equipment to operate 3 large diaphone horns until 1982. The Coast Guard replaced the diaphone horns with an electronic fog horn in 1983 that sounded from the light tower. The Coast Guard stopped fog signals from Whitefish Point in 1995. The GLSHS abandoned their 1996 plans to demolish the fog signal building and started restoration of the exterior of the building in 2002. The GLSHS uses the fog signal building as a ground maintenance facility not open to the public.

Lookout tower: it was built at the Whitefish Point Life-saving Station in 1923 for a 24-hour watch during the shipping season. It was abandoned by the Coast Guard in 1955. The GLSHS moved the lookout tower to its present location and restored it in 1998. It is not open to the public.

Lightkeeper's quarters: this two-story frame building was originally constructed in 1861 as a dwelling for the lightkeeper and his family. Its interior was later reconstructed as two-family duplex to also house the assistant lightkeeper and his family. It housed Coast Guard personnel until 1970. In 1996, the GLSHS restored the building to its 1920 era condition. It is open to the public with a museum admission fee.

Assistant U.S. Coast Guard Chief's Quarters: this two-story dwelling was constructed in 1925 for the light station Chief and family. The GLSHS exhibited shipwreck artifacts in the first story of this building from 1985 until it constructed the museum in 1987.

Crews quarters: the original location of this two-story frame building was threatened by shore erosion. It was sold to private owners and moved from the Whitefish Point Light Station. The GLSHS bought the building in 1990 and moved it back to a new location. GLSHS moved it again in 1999 to comply with the historic zone created by SHPO. GLSHS started renovation of the building in 2002 using $630,280 in TEA-21 federal grant funds. The building is not open to the general public.

Surfboat house: the Coast Guard constructed three boat houses at Whitefish Point. It is believed that the surfboat house was moved to its present location in the 1950s. GLSHS completed restoration of the boat house in 2001. The building displays a full-size replica Beebe-McClellan 26 feet (7.9 m) surfboat and exhibits on the U.S. Life-Saving Service and U.S. Coast Guard Rescue Station as part of the museum tour for an admission fee.

Frame storage building: the Coast Guard constructed this building for firewood storage. GLSHS used it as a gift shop until 2006 when a new, larger building was constructed to house the shop.

Chief's garage: the Coast Guard constructed a 3-car garage in 1940 that has remained in the same location. The WPBO uses the building as a bird banding lab, and a base for educational tours.

Other historic structures: an 1861 steel lamp oil house and a 1910 alcohol house have remained on the site since they were constructed. They were used to store fuel sources for the light before it was electrified in 1931.

== Other features ==
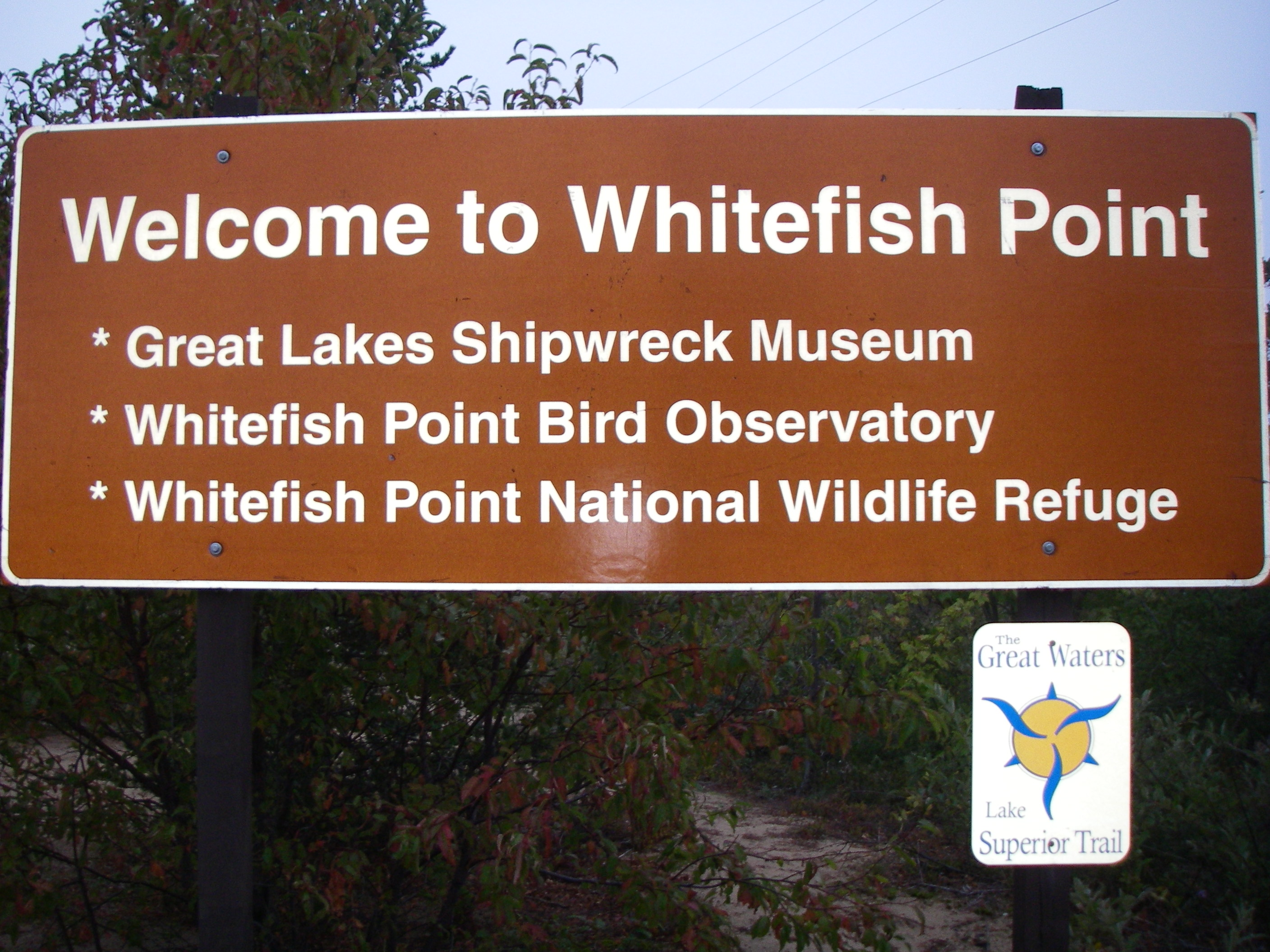
U.S. Fish and Wildlife Service sign at Whitefish Point

Whitefish Point is a popular spot for ship watchers, bird watchers and rock collectors. Important features include:

- Whitefish Point Unit of Seney National Wildlife Refuge: The USFWS manages the 33 acres (13 ha) transferred to them from the former Whitefish Point Light Station as part of the Seney National Wildlife Refuge. In conjunction with the WPBO and other conservation groups, the USFWS added 19.85 acres (8.03 ha) acres and more than 1,000 feet (300 m) of Lake Superior shoreline as critical piping plover habitat to Whitefish Point unit on August 30, 2012. The land of the Whitefish Point Unit is "Wooded Dune and Swell Complex" that is distinctive to the Great Lakes region. It supports a diversity of species, including lady slippers, starflower, bunchberry, Labrador-tea, and a variety of trees. Whitefish Point is on a world migratory flyway. The data collected by the WPBO led to establishing Whitefish Point as a Globally Important Bird Area. In 2001, USFWS designated all of its Whitefish Point property as critical habitat for the piping plover. In 2009, the piping plover began nesting at Whitefish Point again for the first time in at least two decades.
- Whitefish Point Bird Observatory operates as a non-profit, affiliate education and research facility of the Michigan Audubon Society at Whitefish Point.

== Location ==
The museum complex is situated literally at the end of the road about 11 miles (18 km) north of Paradise in Chippewa County in the northeastern Upper Peninsula of Michigan. It is located at the termination of Whitefish Point Road and the entry of Whitefish Bay on Lake Superior.

== See also ==
- Great Lakes Storm of 1913 and Shipwrecks of the 1913 Great Lakes storm
- List of Great Lakes museum and historic ships
- List of historical societies in Michigan
- List of shipwrecks in the Great Lakes
