= SS Vienna (1873) =

Steamship sunk after a collision in Lake Superior

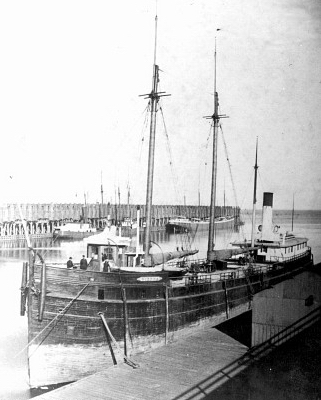
- Vienna at dock.

History

United States
- Name: Vienna
- Owner: Built for Cleveland Transportation Company. Owned by Orient Transportation Company at time of loss
- Port of registry: Cleveland, Ohio
- Builder: Quale & Martin of Cleveland, Ohio
- Completed: 1873
- Fate: Sank in Whitefish Bay 17 September 1892 after she was rammed by the Nipigon
- Notes: United States Registry # 25875

General characteristics
- Class & type: Propeller, wooden steamer
- Tonnage: 1,005.79 GRT; 829.42 NRT
- Length: 191.33 ft (58.32 m)
- Beam: 33.66 ft (10.26 m)
- Depth: 14 ft (4.3 m)
- Propulsion: Propeller
- Notes: Vienna was downbound with her schooner barge tow, Matte C. Bell, when she sank. There were no deaths.

SS Vienna was built in 1873 during the era when steamers were built with sail rigging. She had a 19-year career marked with maritime incidents including sinking when she was just three years old. She sank for her final time in fair weather in Whitefish Bay in Lake Superior after she received a mortal blow when she was inexplicably rammed by the steamer Nipigon. Although there were no deaths when Vienna sank for the last time, more than 100 years later her wreck claimed the lives of four scuba divers, the most of all the wrecks in the Whitefish Point Underwater Preserve that now protects her as part of an underwater museum. Her wreck was stripped of artifacts that resulted in the Michigan Department of Natural Resources seizing her artifacts in a raid on the Great Lakes Shipwreck Museum in 1992. Her artifacts are now on display in this museum as loan from the State of Michigan.

== Career ==
Quayle & Martin built the wooden steamer Vienna with an octagonal pilot house and sail rigging in 1873 for the Cleveland Transportation Company during the era when insurance companies still required ships to carry sails to maintain liability coverage.

Vienna had a series of maritime incidents during her 19-year career. In August 1876, she ran ashore at Presque Isle in Lake Huron and was able to get off. In October 1876 she sank in Lake Superior with a cargo of grain when she was just three years old. She was rebuilt in 1875 – 1876 as a double-decker with three masts and increased tonnage. In September 1883 she sustained considerable damage when the Willow Street bridge swung into her in Cleveland, Ohio. In 1887, she was assisted by the tug Leviathan when she was stranded on an uncharted 14-foot (4.3 m) deep shoal 1.5 to 2 miles (2.4 to 3.2 km) southwest of Waugoshance Light in the Straits of Mackinac with $1,800 in damages. In 1889, she was sold to Orient Transportation Company of Rockport, Ohio. In 1890, her rigging was changed to two masts. She sank for a second and final time in 1892.

== Final voyage ==
In fair weather at 12:25 am on 17 September 1892, the steamer Nipigon was light and upbound in Whitefish Bay in Lake Superior towing the schooners Melbourne and Delaware. Vienna under Captain J.W. Nicholson was downbound from Marquette, Michigan and towing the schooner Mattie C. Bell. Both were heavy with a cargo of iron ore. Vienna and Nipigon exchanged signals for the normal port to port passing but the 191 ft (58 m), 626 ton Nipigon suddenly veered and rammed the 191 ft (58 m), 1,006-ton Vienna on the port side. Both vessels immediately dropped their consorts. Nipigon tried to tow Vienna to shallow water but after an hour they were still about 1 mile (1.6 km) from shore when the ore-laden, mortally wounded Vienna dove into deep water. No one could explain why the Nipigon failed to obey her helm. Vienna was valued at $46,000 but she was only partly insured. Vienna's crew and papers were transferred to the lumber hooker Nipigon. Nipigon's stem and forefoot were badly crushed but she was not leaking much and she was able to proceed on her way. A tug towed Bell to Sault Ste. Marie, Michigan.

== Wreck artifacts ==
The wreck of Vienna was discovered in 1975 by the United States Fisheries R.V. Kohvo research vessel while setting fish sampling nets. She was then extensively explored by divers Kent Bellrichard of Milwaukee, Wisconsin and Tom Farnquist, Director of the Great Lakes Shipwreck Historical Society (GLSHS) and the Great Lakes Shipwreck Museum. Shipwreck historian Gerred wrote of Bellrichard and Farnquist's dives to Vienna:

They had made many trips to the wreck and brought up some interesting artifacts. Among them were a hand carved eagle atop the pilot house, the ship's wheel, wooden blocks, portholes, a telegraph bell, whistle pull, dishes, crocks, and a large grindstone. Farnquist, who is an expert on making lamps, book ends, and tables from wreck material, refinished the wheel. He mounted it against blue velvet with a polished frame of wreck wood. It is displayed at the Lake Superior College and will be donated to their future marine museum. The eagle also was refinished and donated to the museum ship, Valley Camp.

Michigan's Antiquities Act of 1980 prohibited the removal of artifacts from shipwrecks on the Great Lakes bottomlands. The Michigan Department of Natural Resources and Environment (DNRE) 1992 raid on the GLSHS offices and Great Lakes Shipwreck Museum included seizure of artifacts that were illegally removed from the Vienna. Artifacts from Vienna's wreck are on display in the Great Lakes Shipwreck Museum as a loan from the State of Michigan by a 1993 settlement agreement with the GLSHS following the DNRE raid on the museum in 1992. Vienna's wreck is now protected by the Whitefish Point Underwater Preserve as part of an underwater museum.

== Wreck diving ==
Painting of Vienna's wreck

Vienna lies in 120 to 148 feet (37 to 45 m) of water at 46°44.46′N 84°57.91′W. Vienna is one of the more accessible wreck dives in the Whitefish Point Underwater Preserve because she is about 1.5 miles (2.4 km) from shore. She is known as a "blow-off" wreck dive because she lies closer to shore and extended-range divers go to this wreck during high winds and rough seas or when they have limited time. Her wreck is moored to protect her remains and enhance the safety of divers. However, the greater accessibility of Vienna belies her ability to ensnare even technically skilled, experienced scuba divers. The four diving fatalities on her wreck are the most of all the wrecks in the Whitefish Point Underwater Preserve. Her remains are intact and upright and divers especially enjoy exploring her intact bow cabins. In 1994, 102 years after Vienna sank, an experienced male diver who was a member of the Chippewa County Sheriff's Department died while diving her wreck. In 1995, an experienced male diver died of massive emboli after deeply penetrating the wreck, likely running out of air, and attempting an uncontrolled ascent without staged decompression. In 1996, an inexperienced female diver's body was recovered from the wreck of the Vienna in 147 feet (45 m) feet of water when her companion diver who was her fiancé was unable to rescue her. A fourth diving fatality occurred at the wreck of Vienna in 1998 but details of the accident are not available.

== See also ==
- Graveyard of the Great Lakes
