= Whitefish Bay =

Major bay of Lake Superior

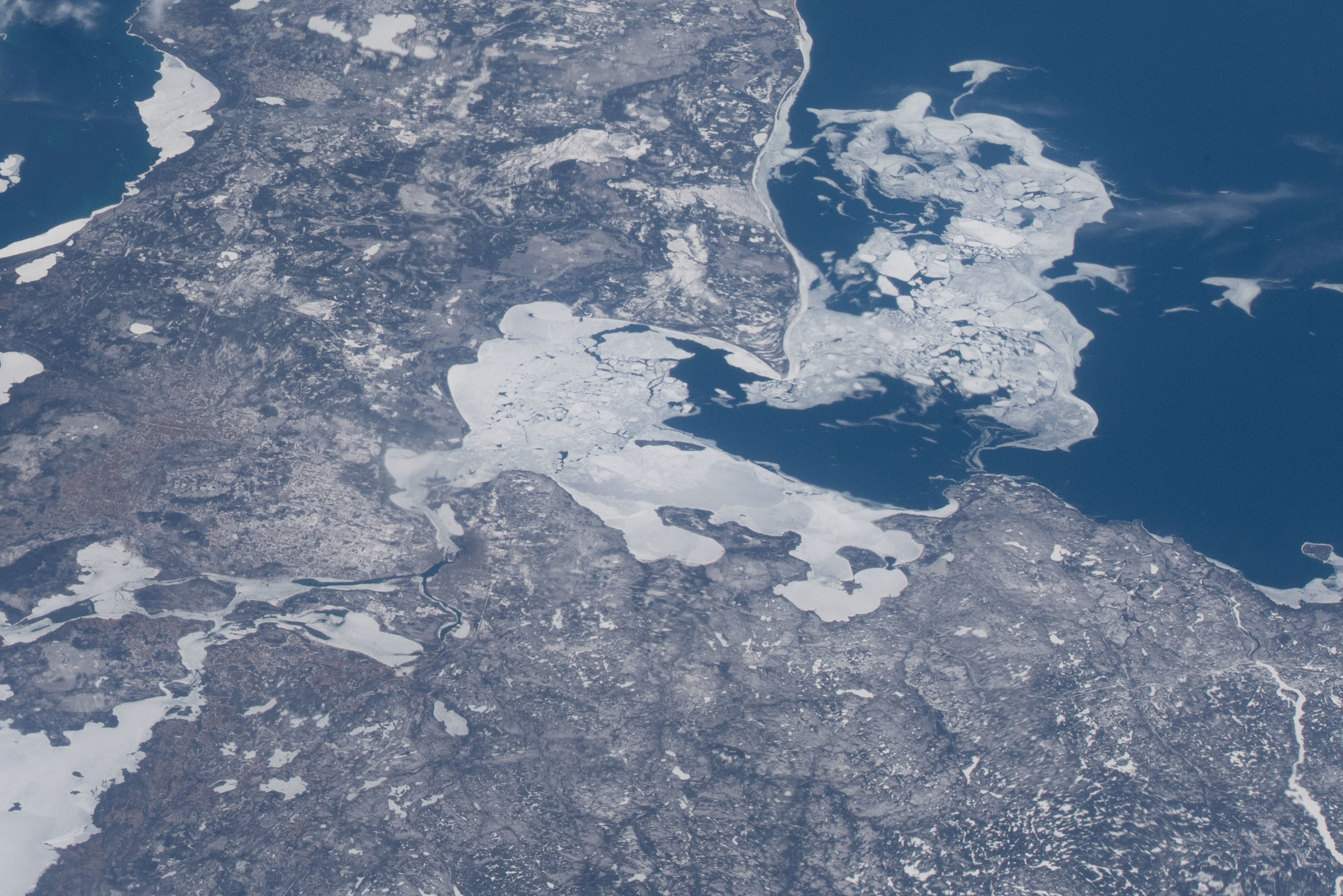
- Taken on April 10, 2022 during Expedition 67 of the International Space Station; north is oriented to the right

- Location within Michigan
- Location: Lake Superior, Michigan and Ontario
- Coordinates: 46°42′8″N 84°47′20″W
- Type: Bay
- Primary outflows: St. Marys River
- Surface elevation: 604 feet (184 m)

Whitefish Bay is a large bay on the eastern end of Lake Superior between Michigan, United States; and Ontario, Canada. It is located between Whitefish Point in Michigan and Whiskey Point along the more rugged, largely wilderness Canadian Shield of Ontario. The international border runs through the bay, which is heavily used by shipping traffic northbound from and southbound to the Soo Locks. It was previously known as Tequamenon Bay in vintage maps and surveyor documents from the 18th and 19th centuries, named for the prominent Tahquamenon River whose mouth feeds into the bay.

The Whitefish Point Light marks the entry of the bay, Ile Parisienne Light is in the middle of the bay, and Gros Cap Reefs Light lies near the outlet of the bay and the approach to the Soo Locks at Sault Ste. Marie, Michigan.

Whitefish Point Lighthouse is the oldest active light on Lake Superior. Part of the lighthouse station houses the Great Lakes Shipwreck Museum. It holds artifacts from the shipwrecks listed below and has information on the notable wreck of SS Edmund Fitzgerald in 1975, in which all 29 crew were lost. Indeed, the famous Gordon Lightfoot song, "The Wreck of the Edmund Fitzgerald," notes that the ship could have reached safety in Whitefish Bay if it could have crossed 15 more miles to enter it.

After the Soo Locks opened in 1855 and ship traffic increased on Lake Superior, Whitefish Bay was the site of numerous shipwrecks, often due to hazardous weather. The Whitefish Point Underwater Preserve was established to preserve many of the shipwrecks of Whitefish Bay for sports divers. Known wrecks include the ships Comet, John B. Cowle, Drake, Samuel Mather, Miztec, Myron, Niagara, John M. Osborn, Sagamore, Superior City, and Vienna.

== Gallery ==
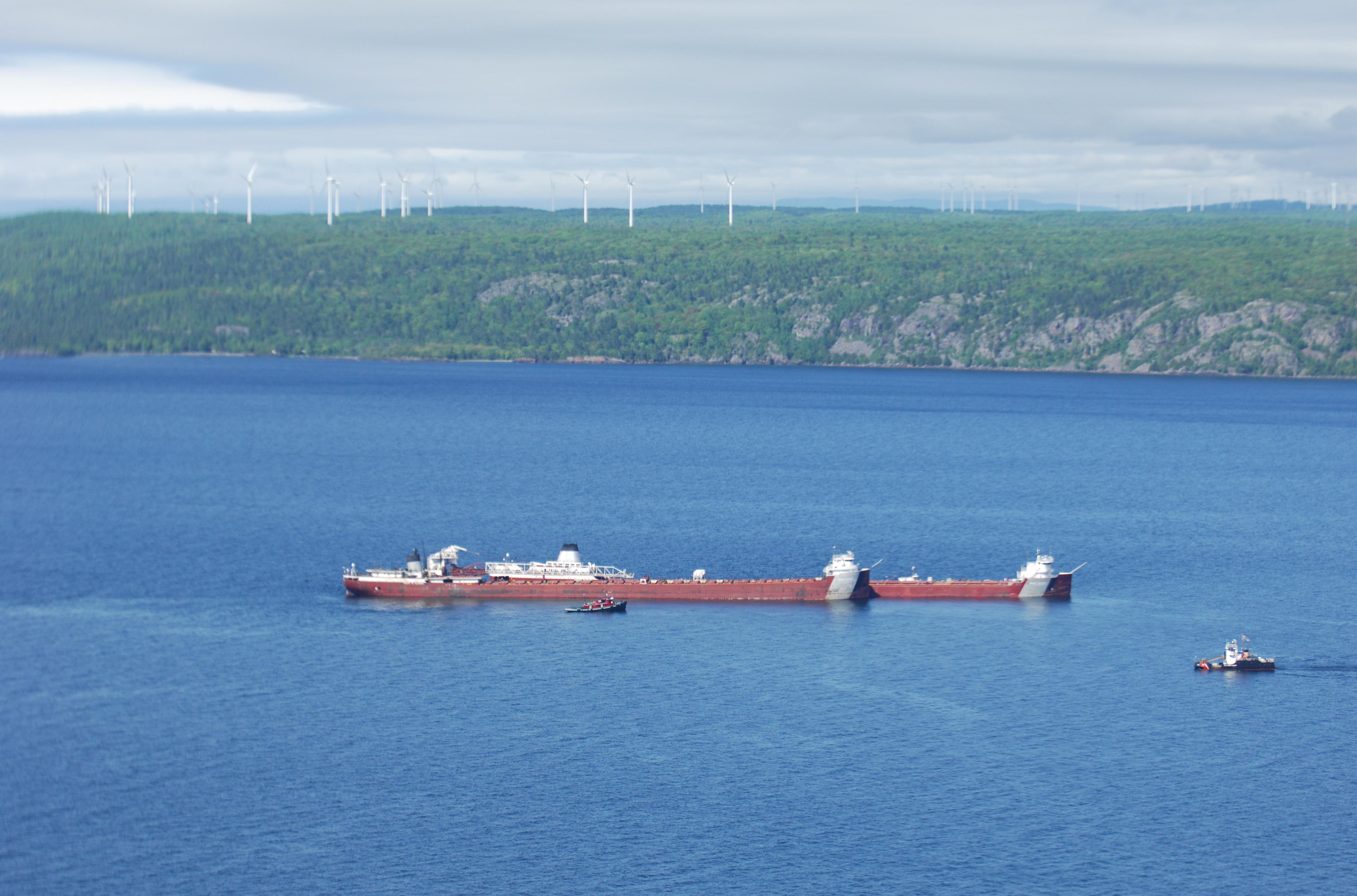
MV Roger Blough aground in Whitefish Bay with Prince Wind Farm in the background

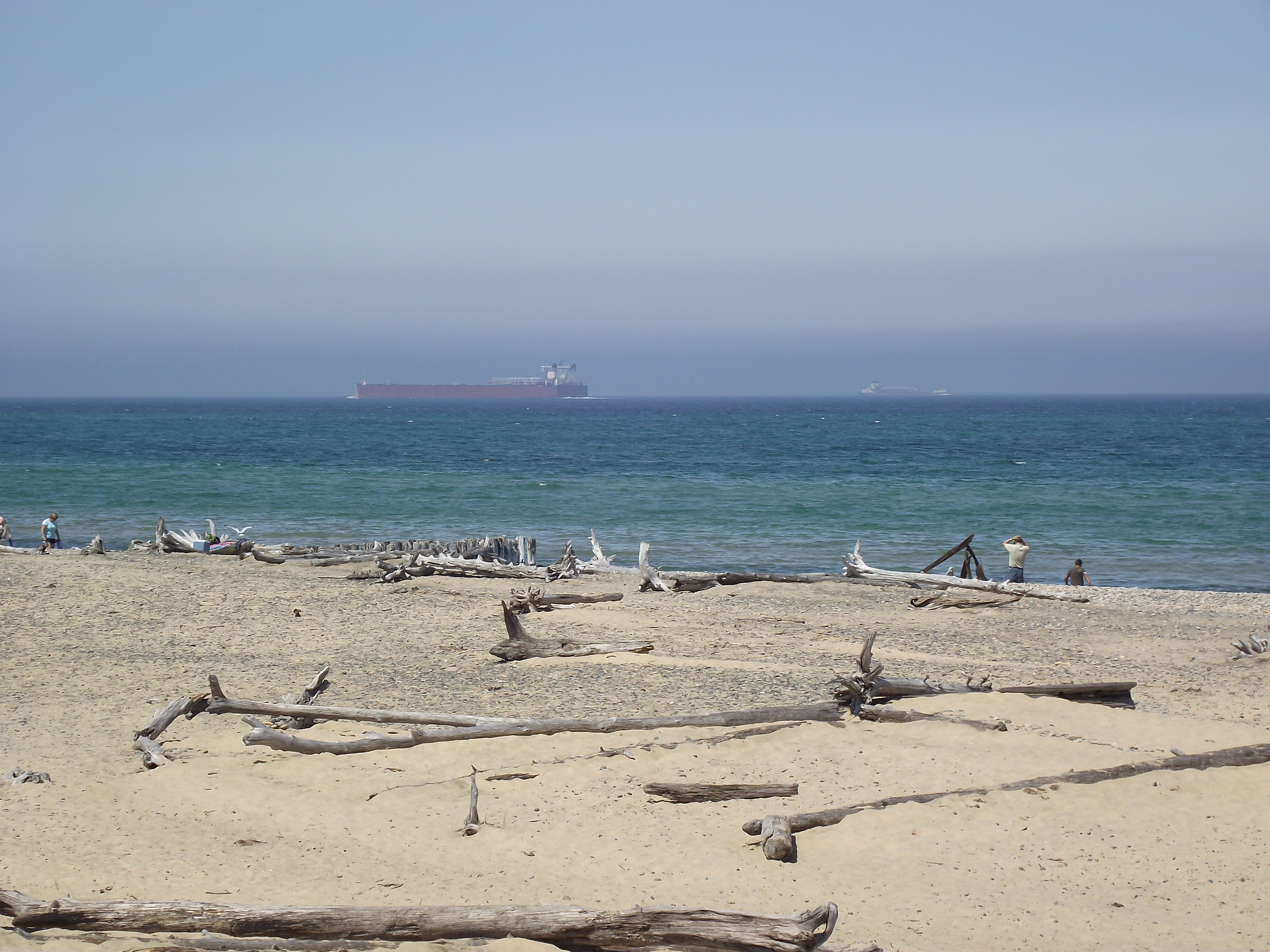
Near Whitefish Point Lighthouse in August 2010

== In popular culture ==
Whitefish Bay is included in the lyrics of singer/composer Gordon Lightfoot's memorial tribute "The Wreck of the Edmund Fitzgerald".

== See also ==
- Ile Parisienne
- Batchawana Bay, a smaller sub-bay of Whitefish Bay
- Goulais Bay, a smaller sub-bay of Whitefish Bay
- Point Iroquois Light
- Sandy Islands Provincial Park
- Shipwrecks of the 1913 Great Lakes storm
- Whitefish Bay National Forest Scenic Byway
