= John M. Osborn =

Wooden steam barge that sank in Lake Superior

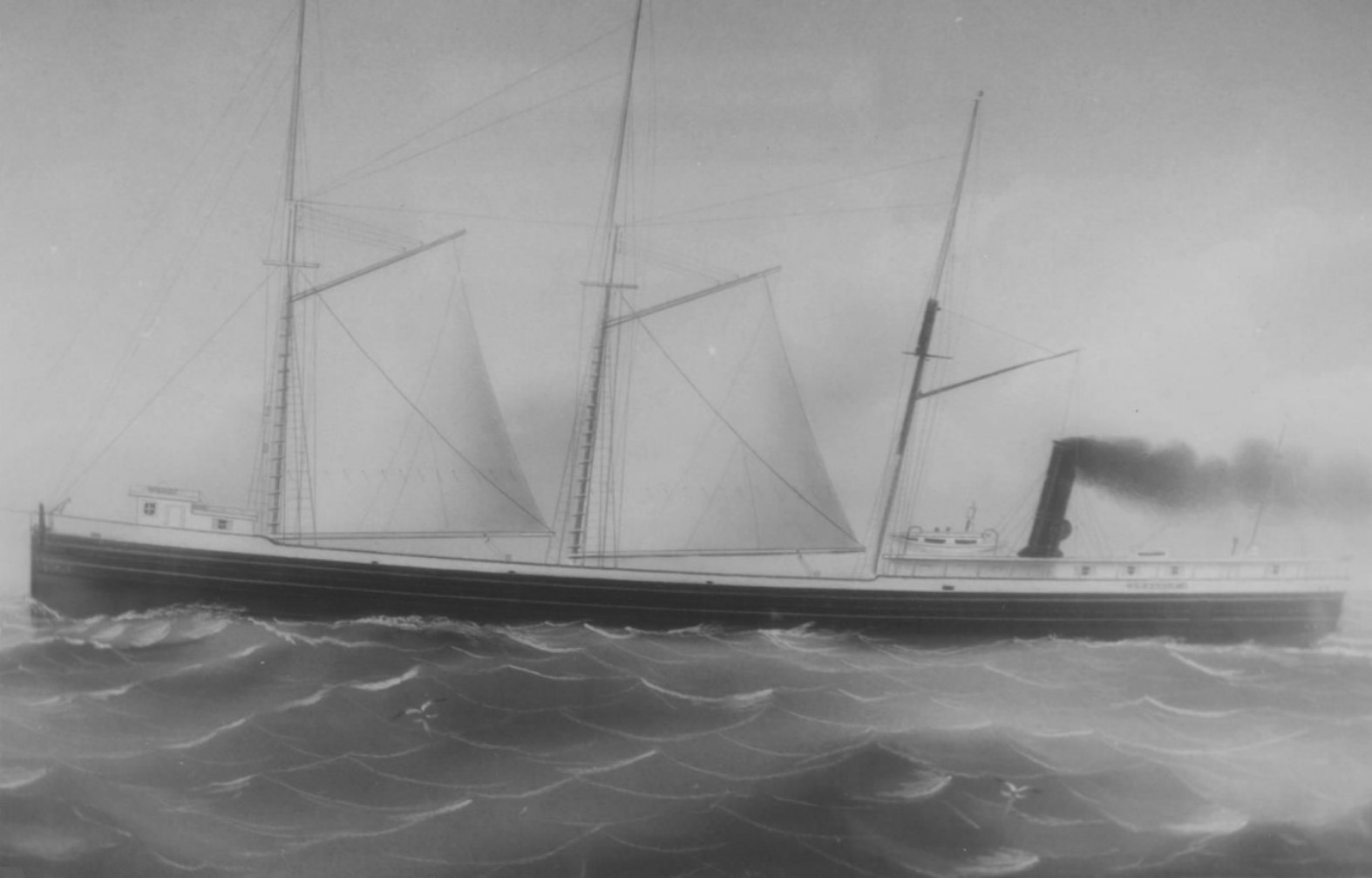
- John M. Osborn under sail.

History
- Name: John M. Osborn
- Owner: George F. Cleveland and the Cleveland Iron Mining Company
- Port of registry: Detroit, Michigan United States
- Builder: Morley & Hill of Marine City, Michigan
- Completed: 1882
- Fate: Sank in Whitefish Bay 27 July 1884 after she was rammed by the Alberta
- Notes: United States Registry # 76307

General characteristics
- Class & type: Propeller, wooden steam barge
- Tonnage: 891.02 Gross Register Tonnage 710.95 Net Register Tonnage
- Length: 178 ft (54 m)
- Beam: 32 ft (9.8 m)
- Depth: 14 ft (4.3 m)
- Propulsion: Propeller

The John M. Osborn was a wooden steam barge that sank in Lake Superior in 1884 with the loss of five lives. The Osborn was just 2 years old when the larger, steel-hulled Alberta, which was called a "steel monster" and "terror of the lakes", rammed her. The wreck of the Osborn was discovered 100 years after her sinking. The wreck was illegally salvaged in the 1980s. Many of Osborn's artifacts became the property of the State of Michigan after they were seized from Great Lakes Shipwreck Museum. The State allows the museum to display the artifacts as a loan. The wreck of the Osborn is now protected by the Whitefish Point Underwater Preserve as part of an underwater museum.

== Construction ==
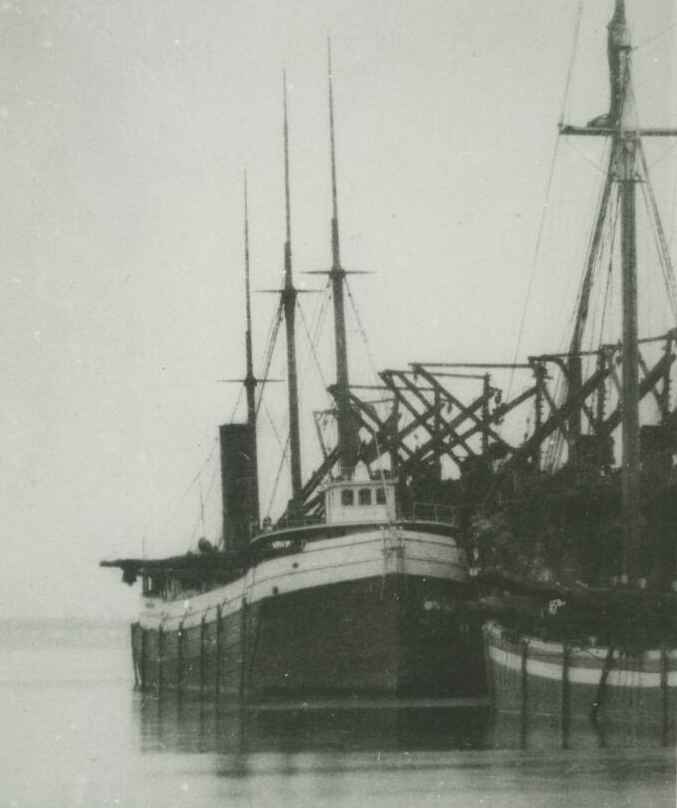
The Osborn before she sank

The John M. Osborn was a propeller wooden steam barge built in 1882 by Morley and Hill in Marine City, Michigan. She was then rebuilt in 1884 in Cleveland, Ohio for increased tonnage. She was owned by George F. Cleveland and the Cleveland Mining Ore Company.

== Final voyage ==
Captain Thomas Wilford's wife Fannie and his two daughters, Cora and Adelaide were on board the Osborn on her final day of 27 July 1884. They enjoyed a sunny day walking the deck, attending Sunday school services, and talking to the sailors, including the mate, George F. Cleveland, who also owned the Osborn. The children were to be put to bed as night fell and a thick fog developed. Mrs. Fannie Wilford was uneasy and stayed near her husband's side on deck near the bow. The wooden Osborn was downbound for the Soo Locks with a cargo of 1,120 tons of iron ore and towing two schooner barges, the George W. Davis and the Thomas Gawn. The Alberta was upbound with her usual number of passengers and freight on her regular run between Owen Sound, Ontario and Port Arthur, Ontario. The Osborn carefully whistled her approach through the fog but one ship whistled once for a starboard course and the other ship whistled twice for a port course. Shipwreck historian Frederick Stonehouse wrote:

As reported in the local papers, 'the barge blew three whistles, the Alberta answering, and checked down to seven miles per hour, but in a moment the Osborn appeared under the Alberta's bow and the latter struck her midway between the main and mizzen masts on the starboard side, cutting her almost in twain.'

When the larger 263 feet (80 m), 2,282 ton, steel steamer Alberta rammed the smaller 178 ft (54 m), 891 ton, wooden Osborn, she penetrated 16 ft (5 m) to the center of the ship cutting her almost in two. The large gash in the Osborn's hull caused the water to hit her hot boilers which exploded and immediately killed two crewmen. Alberta stayed locked with Osborn long enough for Captain Wilford and his wife to transfer to her. One of the Alberta's passengers jumped to the Osborn to save three lives, including Captain Wilford's children. While this rescuer from Alberta was still below decks, the Osborn broke free and sank, taking his life along with those of two crewmen.

Following the collision, the press vilified Alberta. In her first year of service, she was involved in four minor collisions and a fifth major collision that sank the Osborn. The Cleveland News Leader said of the Alberta, "This huge steel monster, during the few months she has been afloat has become the terror of the lakes. Proud of her reputation as one of the fastest side-wheel steamers on fresh water, she has been run in an extraordinarily reckless manner." The Buffalo Daily Courier reported, "Since the collision much has been said about [the Alberta] being cumbersome and unwieldy, to which the accident was partially attributed.

A lawsuit brought by the owners of the Osborn and her cargo lasted nearly three years. The United States District Court ruled both vessels were at fault for excessive speed for conditions. The Osborn loss was about $88,000 and the Alberta's damages was about $20,000. Following admiralty rule for both vessels at fault, the damages were divided by deducting the Alberta's loss from the Osborn's loss, and equally dividing the remainder with the pecuniary result being that Alberta's owners paid the owners of Osborn, and her cargo $33,000. Years later Stonehouse concurred that thick fog and both ships traveling too fast for conditions was the likely cause of the disaster.

== Wreck history ==
The wreck of the John M. Osborn was discovered in 1984, 100 years after she sank; the discoverers were the Great Lakes Shipwreck Historical Society [GLSHS] and the Odyssey Foundation of Lansing, Michigan. In 1985, shipwreck historian Frederick Stonehouse wrote, "Reportedly the Osborn is nearly intact and a time capsule of an earlier era of Great Lakes maritime history." However, Great Lakes diver Steve Harrington reported by 1990, "The remains of the J.M. Osborn were discovered in the mid-1980s and were quickly stripped for the benefit of a local museum. State officials turned a blind eye to the salvage operation."

Michigan's Antiquities Act of 1980 prohibited the removal of artifacts from shipwrecks on the Great Lakes bottomlands. The Michigan Department of Natural Resources and Environment 1992 raid on the GLSHS offices and Great Lakes Shipwreck Museum included seizure of artifacts that were illegally removed from the John M. Osborn.

== Wreck today ==
Artifacts from the Osborn's wreck are on display in the Great Lakes Shipwreck Museum as a loan from the State of Michigan by a 1993 settlement agreement with the GLSHS following the DNR raid on the museum in 1992. The Osborn lies in 165 feet (50 m) of water at 46°51.974′N 85°05.210′W in Whitefish Bay of Lake Superior.

Scuba diving to the Osborn wreck requires advanced technical diving skills. Great Lakes diver Steve Harrington reported, "Today, the J.M. Osborn is upright and mostly intact. Divers enjoy exploring the hull, cargo holds, and cabins of the vessel. The name board and other key artifacts were recovered by the museum." The Osborn wreck is protected for future generations by the Whitefish Point Underwater Preserve as part of an underwater museum.
