= List of Michigan State Historic Sites in Chippewa County =

Location of Chippewa County in Michigan

The following is a list of Michigan State Historic Sites in Chippewa County, Michigan. Sites marked with a dagger (†) are also listed on the National Register of Historic Places in Chippewa County, Michigan.

== Current listings ==
Name	Image	Location	City	Listing date
Allen House		126 E. Water Street	Sault Ste. Marie	October 1, 1971
Bishop Frederick Baraga House		501 E. Water Street	Sault Ste. Marie	February 19, 1958
Bay City House Hotel	Bay City House Hotel	501 East Portage	Sault Ste. Marie	March 22, 1983
Birch Lodge†	Birch Lodge at Trout Lake	21830 S. Birch Lodge Dr.	Trout Lake	November 20, 1987
Carnegie Library		315 Armory Place	Sault Ste. Marie	January 8, 1981
Central Methodist Church†		111 East Spruce Street	Sault Ste. Marie	June 17, 1993
Church of Our Saviour, Friend of Children†	Church of Our Savior	North Shore Road, Sugar Island, Payment Settlement	Sugar Island Township	January 19, 1978
Elmwood†		435 E. Water Street	Sault Ste. Marie	September 25, 1956
Emerson Informational Site		M-123	Paradise vicinity	August 3, 1979
Federal Building†		209 East Portage Avenue	Sault Ste. Marie	December 14, 1976
Fort Brady (20CH51)†		Bounded by the C.O.E. Service Plaza on the north, Portage St. on the south, Brady St. on the east, and Bingham St. on the west	Sault Ste. Marie	August 23, 1956
Fort Colyer†		West end of Drummond Island (northwest shore of Whitney Bay), Sec. 1, T41N, R4E	De Tour Village vicinity	November 27, 1956
Fort Repentigny Informational Designation		Park Place and River Street	Sault Ste. Marie	February 18, 1956
Governor Cass and the Indians Informational Designation		Foot of Bingham Avenue, Brady Field	Sault Ste. Marie	February 18, 1956
Johnston Homestead Informational Site		Neebish Island	Barbeau vicinity	April 4, 1975
John Johnston House†		415 East Waters Street	Sault Ste. Marie	February 19, 1958
Lake Superior State College		West Easterday Road near the intersection with Meridian Road	Sault Ste. Marie	February 21, 1975
Larke Road Informational Designation		Three Mile Road	Sault Ste. Marie	January 13, 1982
Legends of Hiawatha		Tahquamenon Falls State Park	Whitefish Township	February 12, 1959
Louis W. Hill†		Old Union Carbide Dock, foot of Johnstone Street	Sault Ste. Marie	October 1, 1971
Methodist Indian Mission Informational Site	Methodist Indian Mission	1420 Riverside Drive	Sault Ste. Marie	October 9, 1978
New Fort Brady†		Lake Superior State College campus	Sault Ste. Marie	July 17, 1970
New Pine Grove Cemetery		5750 S. Mackinac Trail	Sault Ste. Marie	July 18, 1996
Governor Chase Salmon Osborn Informational Designation		Historic Walkway of Sault Ste. Marie	Sault Ste. Marie	April 10, 1986
Saint Mary's Falls Canal†		Canal Park, Portage Avenue	Sault Ste. Marie	February 12, 1959
Saint Mary's Pro-Cathedral†		320 E Portage Avenue	Sault Ste. Marie	July 20, 1989
Sault Ste. Marie Informational Designation		Rest Area on I-75, 5 miles south of Sault Ste. Marie	Sault Ste. Marie	February 18, 1956
Shelldrake Informational Site		Whitefish Point Rd	Paradise vicinity	August 3, 1979
Whitefish Point Lighthouse†		Whitefish Point, 6 miles NE of Shelldrake on Whitefish Road	Shelldrake vicinity	February 22, 1974
Whitefish Point Post Office	Whitefish Point Post Office	16878 N. Whitefish Point Rd.	Paradise vicinity	August 3, 1979
Whitefish Township Informational Designation		S.R. 48 M-123	Paradise	March 15, 1990

== See also ==
- National Register of Historic Places listings in Chippewa County, Michigan

== Sources ==
- Historic Sites Online – Chippewa County. Michigan State Housing Developmental Authority. Accessed January 23, 2011.
