= Emerson, Michigan =

- Unincorporated community
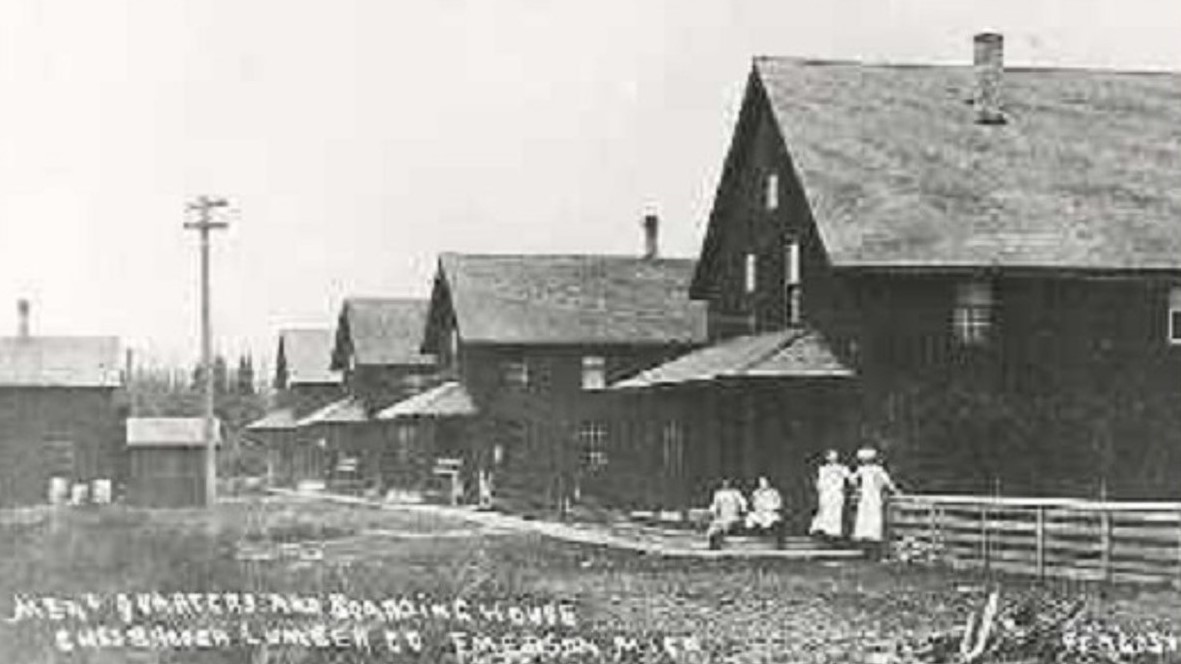
- Historic image of Emerson during the 1880s

- Location within the state of Michigan Location within the United States
- Coordinates: 46°33′23″N 85°01′45″W
- Country: United States
- State: Michigan
- County: Chippewa
- Township: Whitefish
- Settled: 1880
- Elevation: 604 ft (184 m)
- Time zone: UTC-5 (Eastern (EST))
  - Summer (DST): UTC-4 (EDT)
- ZIP code(s): 49768 (Paradise)
- Area code: 906
- GNIS feature ID: 1617545

Emerson is an uninhabited unincorporated community in Chippewa County in the U.S. state of Michigan. As an unincorporated community, Emerson has no legally defined boundaries or population statistics of its own. The community is located within Whitefish Township.

Emerson was settled as a lumber community as early as 1880 near the mouth of the Tahquamenon River. After the lumber industry declined by 1920, the community slowly dwindled and became a ghost town during the 1940s. There are very few remnants of the former community, and it was later recognized as a Michigan State Historic Site in 1979.

== Geography ==
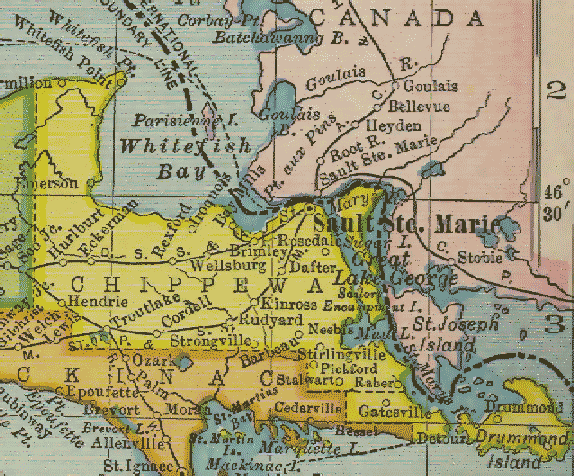
Emerson appearing on a 1904 map of Chippewa County

Emerson is located in Chippewa County in the state's Upper Peninsula. Located in Whitefish Township along the shores of Lake Superior, the community sits at an elevation of 604 feet (184 m) above sea level.

The community is located along the river mouth of the Tahquamenon River about 5.0 miles (8.0 km) south of the community of Paradise. M-123, known locally as Whitefish Point Road, is the main roadway through the community and surrounding area. Other nearby unincorporated communities include Shelldrake and Whitefish Point to the north. Located further upstream along the Tahquamenon River to the west are the communities of Snug Harbor, Whitehouse Landing, and Timberlost. The community of Eckerman is located much further to the south along M-123 in Chippewa Township. The nearest incorporated municipality is the village of Newberry about 45.0 miles (72.4 km) to the southwest via roadway.

The community is located within Tahquamenon Falls State Park near the Rivermouth Campground. The Michigan Department of Natural Resources maintains a public boat launch at the mouth of the Tahquamenon River. Section 69 of the Newberry Unit of the Lake Superior State Forest is also located within the vicinity. The surrounding waters of Lake Superior are also part of the Whitefish Point Underwater Preserve. The North Country Trail passes through the area and portions of the state park. The Emerson Trail is a 1.0 mile (1.6 km) extension that connects M-123 to the shores of Lake Superior. Passing through forest and swampland, it leads to the lakeshore where a former sawmill once stood.

Emerson no longer has its own post office and is served by the Paradise 49768 ZIP Code. The community and surrounding area are served by Whitefish Township Schools in Paradise.

== History ==
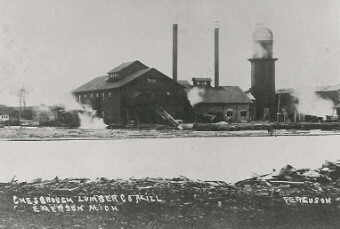
Chesbrough Lumber Company (c. 1880s)

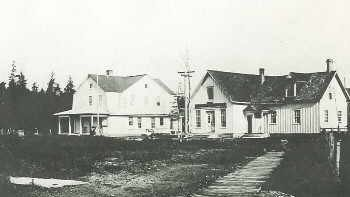
Emerson Inn and post office (c. 1890s)

The area was settled as early as 1880 when Kurt Emerson of Saginaw built a sawmill here. The community grew after his relatives, the Chesbrough brothers from Detroit, built a very large sawmill in 1882. The community was named Emerson after another relative, eccentric millionaire lumberman Chris Emerson. A post office began operating here on April 15, 1884, with Fremont B. Chesbrough serving as the first postmaster. The community became part of Whitefish Township when the township was formally organized in 1888. In 1890, Emerson had a population of 109 residents, while the sparsely populated township recorded a population of 251 at the 1890 census. At that time, the community was isolated and had no roadways. Travel and supplies came weekly by ship from Sault Ste. Marie during the navigation season. The first roadway to Emerson was built in 1891, and the community grew to include a general store and school.

By the turn of the century, the community was thriving, and numerous other lumbering companies settled in the area to exploit the region's plentiful lumber resources. Emerson benefited greatly due to its location near the mouth of the Tahquamenon River, where lumber was routinely floated down the river to the lakefront sawmills that could easily ship the lumber. The Chesbrough Lumber Company could process 125,000 board feet (290 m^{3}) of lumber a day. After the lumber resources were depleted, the sawmill closed in 1912. Many residents soon left the community, and the post office was closed on February 15, 1914. The lumber industry continued in the area but was mostly centered in the community of Shelldrake to the north. Shelldrake suffered a similar fate after the lumber industry ceased operation there by 1925.

After the sawmill closed, Emerson continued to sustain as a commercial fishing community, but the population dwindled. In 1927, a new school was built nearby in the community of Paradise, and the school in Emerson closed. By 1939, Emerson had around 25 residents that consisted of fishermen and their families. The following year, an unnamed resident deeded 2,000 acres (8.09 km^{2}) of land to the state. In 1947, the area became part of the newly established Tahquamenon Falls State Park. By 1954, M-123 was extended north to the Tahquamenon River at Emerson. However, by this time, the community was completely abandoned, and all remaining structures were removed or demolished. The only remaining trace of the former community is the eroding concrete foundation of the Chesbrough Lumber Company sawmill on an unnamed island just south of the mouth of the Tahquamenon River.

=== Historic designation ===
Emerson Informational Designation
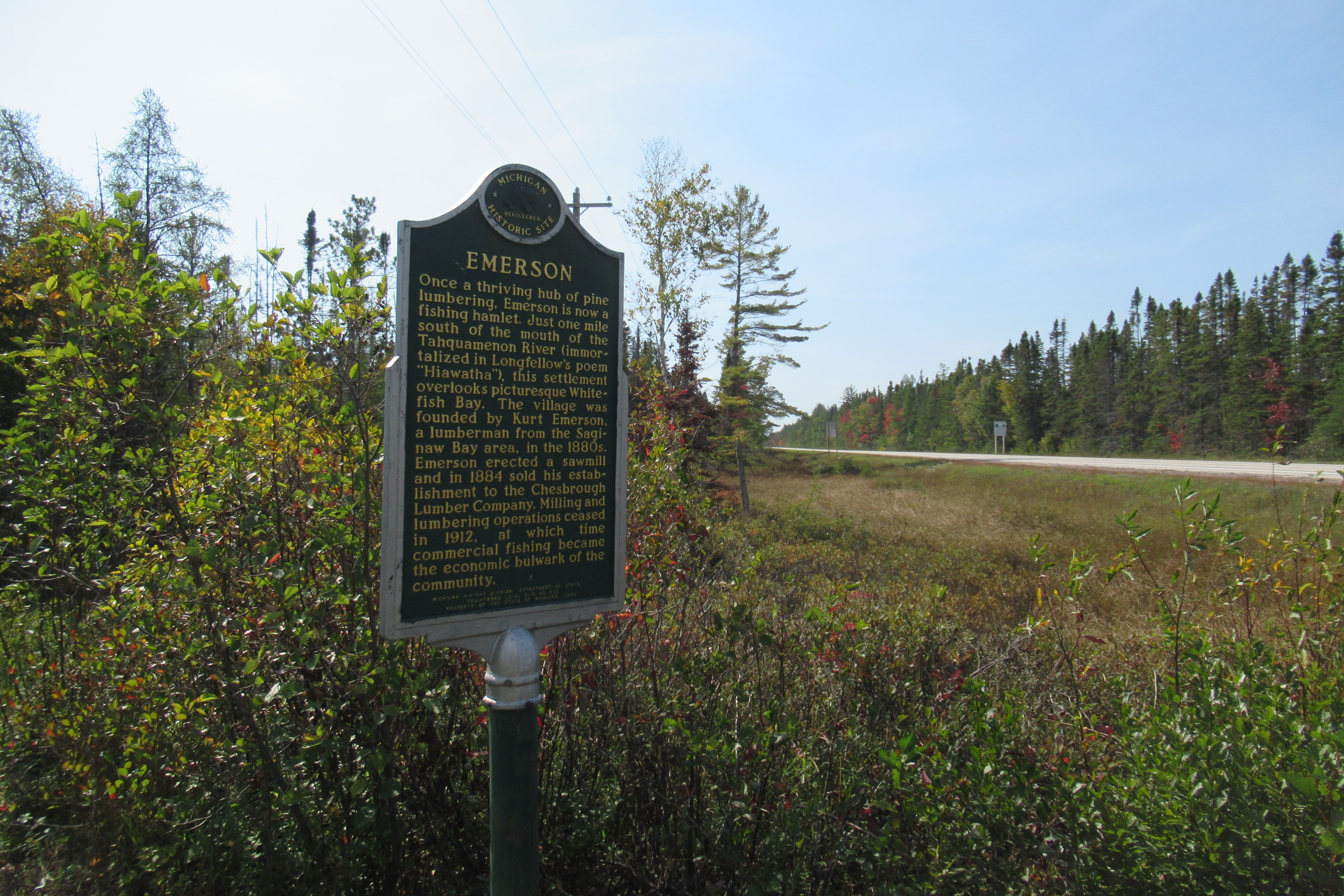
- Interactive map of Emerson Informational Designation
- 46°33′12″N 85°02′05″W
- Location: Just south of the Tahquamenon River on M-123; Whitefish Township, Michigan

Michigan State Historic Site
- Designated: August 3, 1979

Although the area is a very popular tourist destination, the former community of Emerson has fallen into obscurity. Emerson was dedicated as a Michigan State Historic Site on August 3, 1979. In 1980, the state of Michigan erected a historic marker along the east roadside of M-123 just south of the mouth of the Tahquamenon River. This historic marker is located at the beginning of the Emerson Trail, which is the former roadway leading to the shores of Lake Superior where the center of the community once stood. The historic marker has identical text on both sides:

Emerson: Once a thriving hub of pine lumbering, Emerson is now a fishing hamlet. Just one mile south of the mouth of the Tahquamenon River (immortalized in Longfellow's poem "Hiawatha"), this settlement overlooks picturesque Whitefish Bay. The village was founded by Kurt Emerson, a lumberman from the Saginaw Bay area, in the 1880s. Emerson erected a sawmill and in 1884 sold his establishment to the Chesbrough Lumber Company. Milling and lumbering operations ceased in 1912, at which time commercial fishing became the economic bulwark of the community.

The next nearest Michigan State Historic Site is the Whitefish Township historic marker about 3.8 miles (6.1 km) to the north next to the Whitefish Township Community Center. Although the community is listed as a populated place by the Geographic Names Information System, it can be considered a ghost town with no remaining structures or residents. Although uninhabited, the Emerson name still appears on many current maps.
