= Chippewa Township, Michigan =

Chippewa Township is the name of some places in the U.S. state of Michigan:

- Chippewa Township, Chippewa County, Michigan
- Chippewa Township, Isabella County, Michigan
- Chippewa Township, Mecosta County, Michigan

== See also ==
- Chippewa Township (disambiguation)
