= Whitefish Bay National Forest Scenic Byway =

County road in Chippewa County, Michigan, US

Whitefish Bay National Forest Scenic Byway
- Whitefish Bay NFSB highlighted in red

Route information
- Maintained by CCRC and USFS
- Length: 27.138 mi (43.674 km)
- Existed: February 8, 1989–present

Major junctions
- West end: M-123 in Whitefish Township
- East end: Lakeshore Drive in Bay Mills Township

Location
- Country: United States
- State: Michigan
- Counties: Chippewa

Highway system
- Scenic Byways; National; National Forest; BLM; NPS; County roads in Michigan
- Federal Forest Highways

The Whitefish Bay National Forest Scenic Byway is a National Forest Scenic Byway that runs along Whitefish Bay in the Hiawatha National Forest in the U.S. state of Michigan. The byway mostly follows Federal Forest Highway 42 (FFH 42) through Chippewa County in the Upper Peninsula. As a forest highway, it is maintained jointly by the Chippewa County Road Commission (CCRC) and the U.S. Forest Service (USFS). The route of the byway first existed as an earth road by the 1930s; it was improved into a gravel road in the 1940s and paved between the 1950s and the 1980s. The byway designation was created in 1989.

== Route description ==
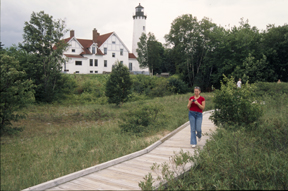
Point Iroquois Lighthouse as seen from the adjoining boardwalk

The byway starts at an intersection with M-123 south of Paradise in the Hiawatha National Forest where it runs eastward along Lake Superior Shoreline Road through birch forests. The roadway runs parallel to the North Country Trail, a hiking trail that spans several northern U.S. states; the trail crosses the road near Naomikong Creek. After about three miles (4.8 km), the road comes to the shores of Tahquamenon Bay, part of the larger Whitefish Bay. The byway follows the shoreline running near sandy beaches at the edge of the forest. Near Naomikong Point, the roadway turns inland for about three miles (4.8 km). Along this section, Lake Superior Shoreline Road, which bears the FFH 3150 designation, ends at the intersection with Lakeshore Road. East of here, the byway transitions from FFH 3150 to follow FFH 42 easterly. FFH 42 runs along the shoreline providing access to two campgrounds at Monocle Lake and Bay View as well as picnic areas. The road also provides access to the Point Iroquois Lighthouse which is open for tours. The lighthouse was built in 1870 and offers visitors a view of the Canadian shore at the top of its spiral staircase. After passing through the Point Iroquois area, FFH 42 turns southward to follow the shore line on Iroquois Road, terminating at the national forest boundary west of Brimley. The FFH 42 number is not signed along the roadway.

== History ==
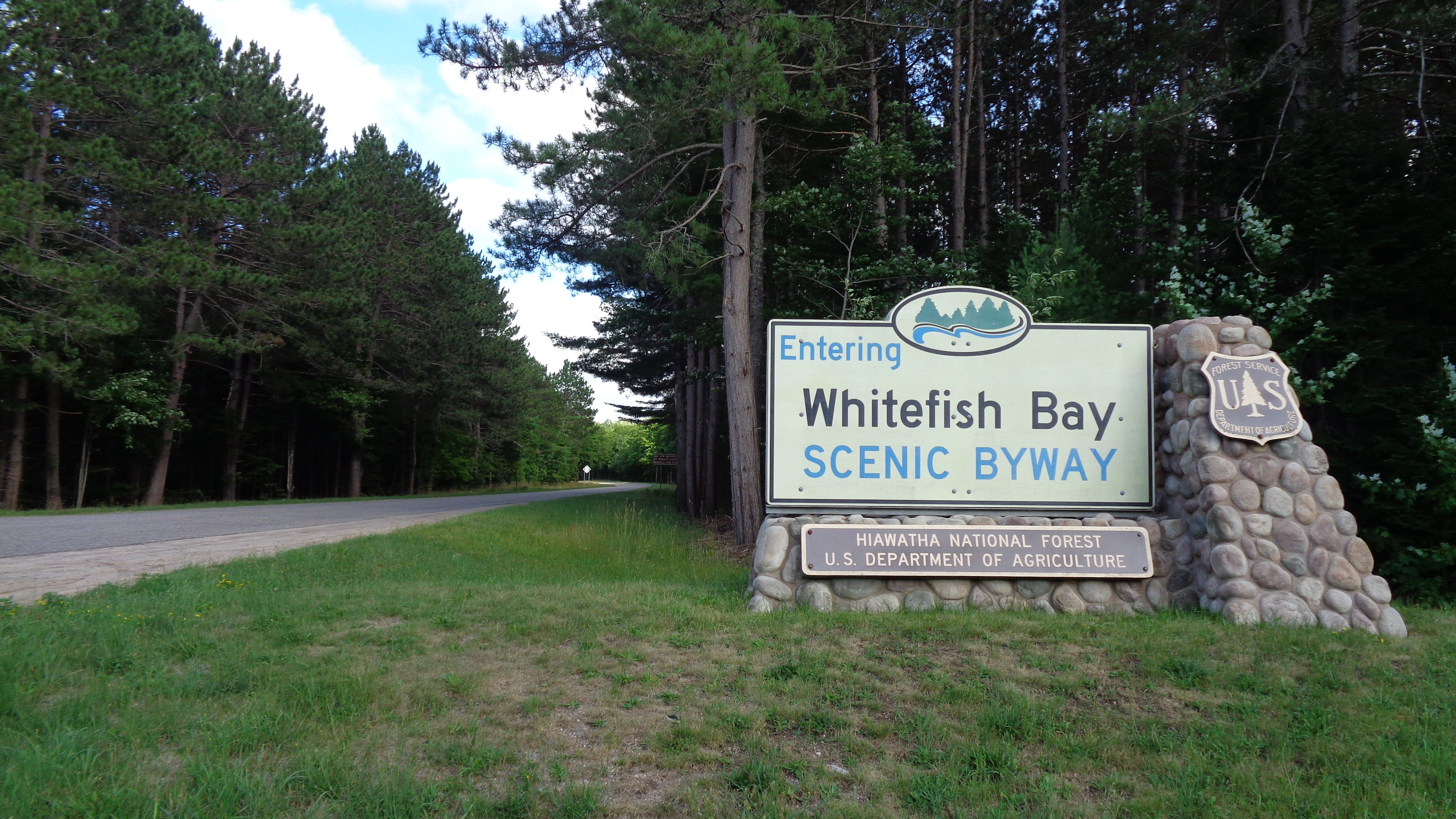
Entrance at Lake Superior Shoreline Road and M-123

The roadway is part of the Forest Highway System that is funded and administered by the USFS and the Federal Highway Administration; the system was created by the Federal Aid Highway Act of 1921. An earthen roadway was present through the area by 1936. In the beginning of 1937, the easternmost section around Point Iroquois was improved to a gravel road. Two years later, the westernmost section from Naomikong Point to the junction with M-123 was improved to gravel. The entire road surface was improved to gravel by 1945. Paving started on the road in the mid-1950s on the eastern end.

The section through the Naomikong Point area was built starting in 1967 by the Michigan State Highway Department under contract to the USFS. The road, at the time, was intended to be part of a longer scenic highway that would connect a proposed lakeshore road through the Pictured Rocks National Lakeshore with roads running along Whitefish Bay and the St. Marys River south of Sault Ste. Marie. The western end was realigned and paved in the late 1970s, moving the roadway closer to Tahquamenon Bay west of Naomikong Point. The former roadway was removed in the process. The last section was paved in 1987 between the two paved sections at Naomikong and Iroquois points. The National Forest Scenic Byway designation was granted on February 8, 1989. The roadway is maintained by the CCRC along with the USFS.

== Major intersections ==
The entire byway is in Chippewa County.

Location	mi	km	Destinations	Notes
Whitefish Township	0.000	0.000	M-123 / LSCT	Western terminus
Bay Mills Township	9.500	15.289	FFH 42	Byway transitions from FFH 3150 to FFH 42
Bay Mills Township	27.138	43.674	Lakeshore Drive	Eastern terminus at national forest boundary
1.000 mi = 1.609 km; 1.000 km = 0.621 mi

== See also ==
- Black River National Forest Scenic Byway, the other National Forest Scenic Byway in the Upper Peninsula
- River Road National Scenic Byway, another National Forest Scenic Byway in Michigan
