= Shelldrake, Michigan =

- Ghost town
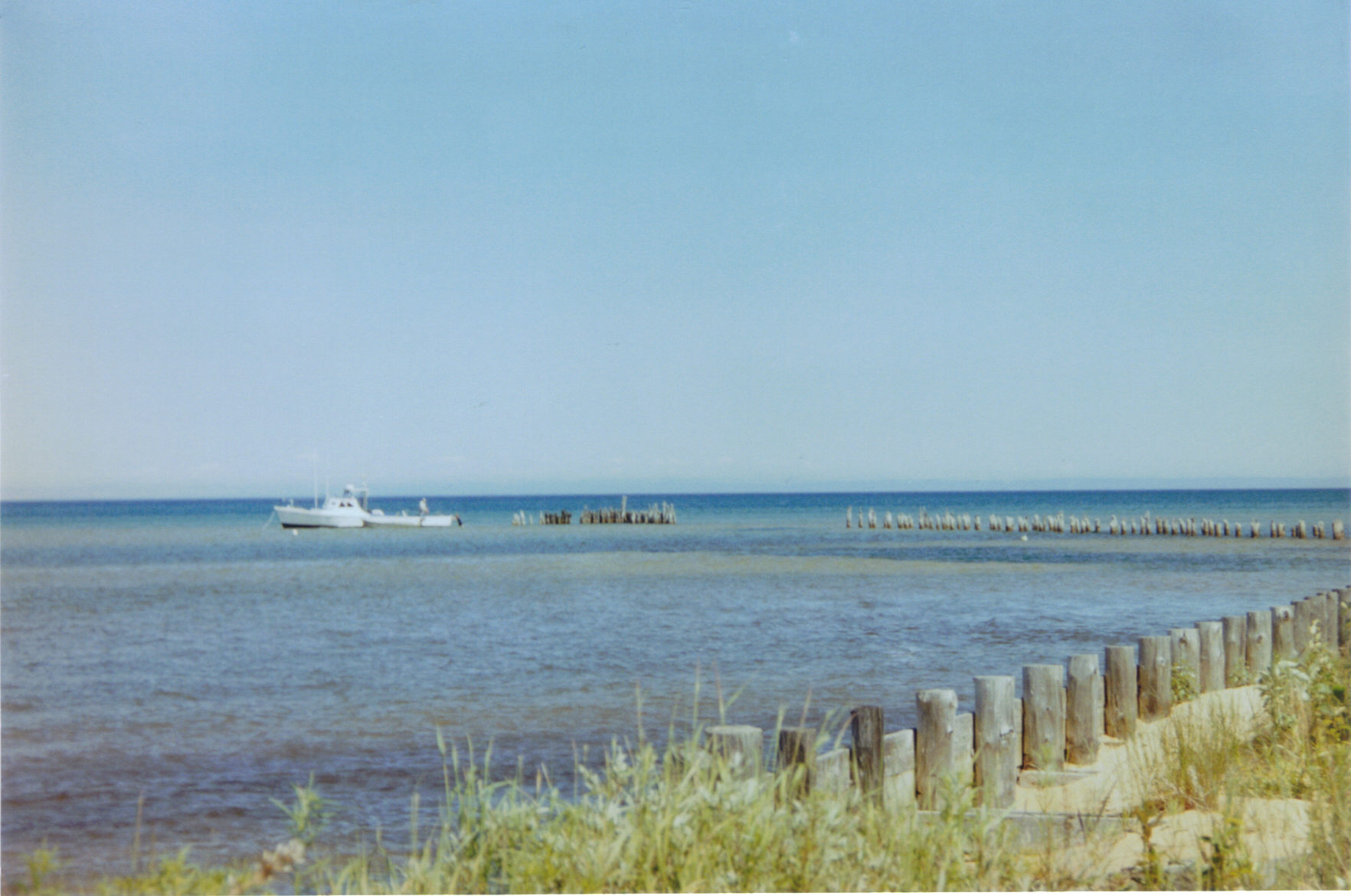
- Remnants of the tramway used for loading lumber on to ships in Whitefish Bay

- Location within the state of Michigan
- Coordinates: 46°40′40″N 85°02′01″W
- Country: United States
- State: Michigan
- County: Chippewa
- Township: Whitefish
- Elevation: 607 ft (185 m)
- Time zone: UTC-5 (Eastern (EST))
  - Summer (DST): UTC-4 (EDT)
- ZIP code(s): 49768 (Paradise)
- Area code: 906
- GNIS feature ID: 637729

Shelldrake, Michigan
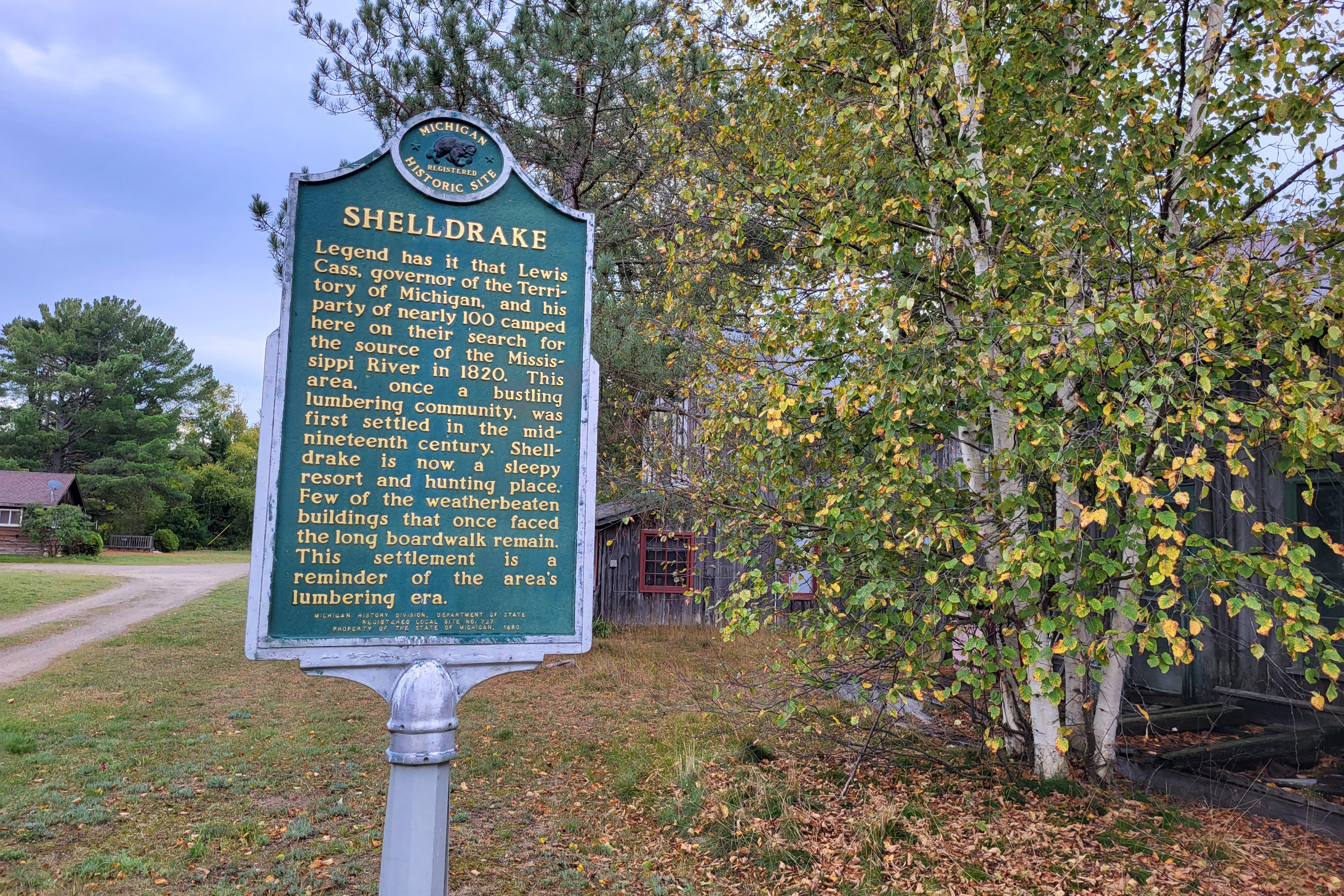
- Historic marker along N. Whitefish Point Rd.
- Interactive map of Shelldrake, Michigan

Michigan State Historic Site
- Designated: August 3, 1979

Shelldrake is a ghost town in Whitefish Township, Chippewa County, Michigan, United States, about 8 miles (13 km) south of Whitefish Point, Michigan at the mouth of the Shelldrake River (also known as the Betsy River) on Whitefish Bay. It is listed on the Michigan Historic Register. Prior to European settlement it supported a seasonal Native American fishing village. In the 1890s and early 1900s, it was a thriving sawmill town during peak logging years on the Tahquamenon River watershed. By the 1920s repeated fires and the decline of lumbering led to its demise. Today it is a privately owned ghost town with only a few weathered, original buildings.

== Early days ==
According to Jesuit scholar Father Gagnieur, Shelldrake derived its name from the Ojibwa word Anzigo-ziibi. Though some cite Shelldrake to mean a species of duck called the "cross-bill," the Ojibwa word anzig means either a sheldrake or a sawbill duck (also known as a merganser). Shelldrake was first a Native American fishing village. Today a road closely follows the trail that ran from Shelldrake to Vermilion Point. Native Americans are believed to have used this trail to reach mines of red ochre (also known as vermilion), which they used for paint pigment.

== Lumbering days ==
Cornelius ("Con") Culhane, who attained "Paul Bunyan-like" status in local lumbering legend, contracted to haul timber by railroad from logging camps to Shelldrake throughout its sawmill years. Rather than struggle through the swamps of the lowland between the Two Hearted and the Tahquamenon rivers, he transported "his entire outfit by train, pulling the tracks up behind him, laying new rails in front."

A 1914 University of Michigan scientific expedition to the Whitefish Point peninsula traveled to Shelldrake by the lumbering company’s tug. Scientist W.S. McAlpine described Shelldrake as "... a typical small lumbering town, owned principally by the Shelldrake Lumber Company. A narrow gauge lumber railroad runs westerly from town for several miles."

The Penoyer brothers from Bay City, Michigan began the first lumbering operations on the mouth of the Shelldrake River in 1895 with the construction of a sawmill, long docks, and a tramway into Whitefish Bay for loading lumber onto ships. They owned a large block of pine lands in the Tahquamenon River watershed. The Calumet and Hecla copper mining company bought the sawmill and uncut timber in 1899 for their mines. Calumet and Hecla sold out to a Canadian firm, the Bartlett Brothers, in 1910. Lumber milling continued at Shelldrake until 1925 when a fire burned down the sawmill plant for the second time.

== Settlement ==
By the late 1890s, Shelldrake had a sawmill, houses for workers that were equipped with bathrooms, a hospital, a school house, a post office, and an icehouse that could store enough meat to feed a population of 1,000 through the winter months. All of the buildings were plastered and had hot water piped from the sawdust burner. There was a stagecoach between Eckerman, Michigan and Shelldrake daily in the summer and three times a week during the winter. At one time there was also a passenger ship sailing between Shelldrake and Sault Ste. Marie, Michigan.

== Today ==
Shelldrake was listed on Michigan’s Historic Register in 1979 with the period of historical significance designated as 1600–1825. However, Shelldrake did not become settled as a lumber town until the late 1890s. The state marker text reads:

Shelldrake legend has it that Lewis Cass, governor of the Territory of Michigan, and his party of nearly 100 camped here in their search for the source of the Mississippi River in 1820. This area, once a bustling lumbering community, was first settled in the mid-nineteenth century. Shelldrake is now a sleepy resort and hunting place. Few of the weatherbeaten buildings that once faced the long boardwalk remain. This settlement is a reminder of the area’s lumbering era.

Although Shelldrake was sold to private owners during the 1930s, it never developed into a resort or hunting place despite what is recorded on the Michigan historic marker. It is now a privately owned ghost town with only a few weathered, original buildings at the site.

== Directions ==
Take M-123 to Paradise to the intersection with Whitefish Point Road, continue straight on Whitefish Point Road for 3.7 miles (6.0 km), turn right on Superior Drive, travel 0.1 miles (0.16 km) to first curve, park and walk right/south on the trail intersecting Superior Drive for approximately 300 feet (91 m). The historic buildings and state marker are on the right of the trail facing Whitefish Bay.
