= Whitefish Township, Michigan =

- Civil township
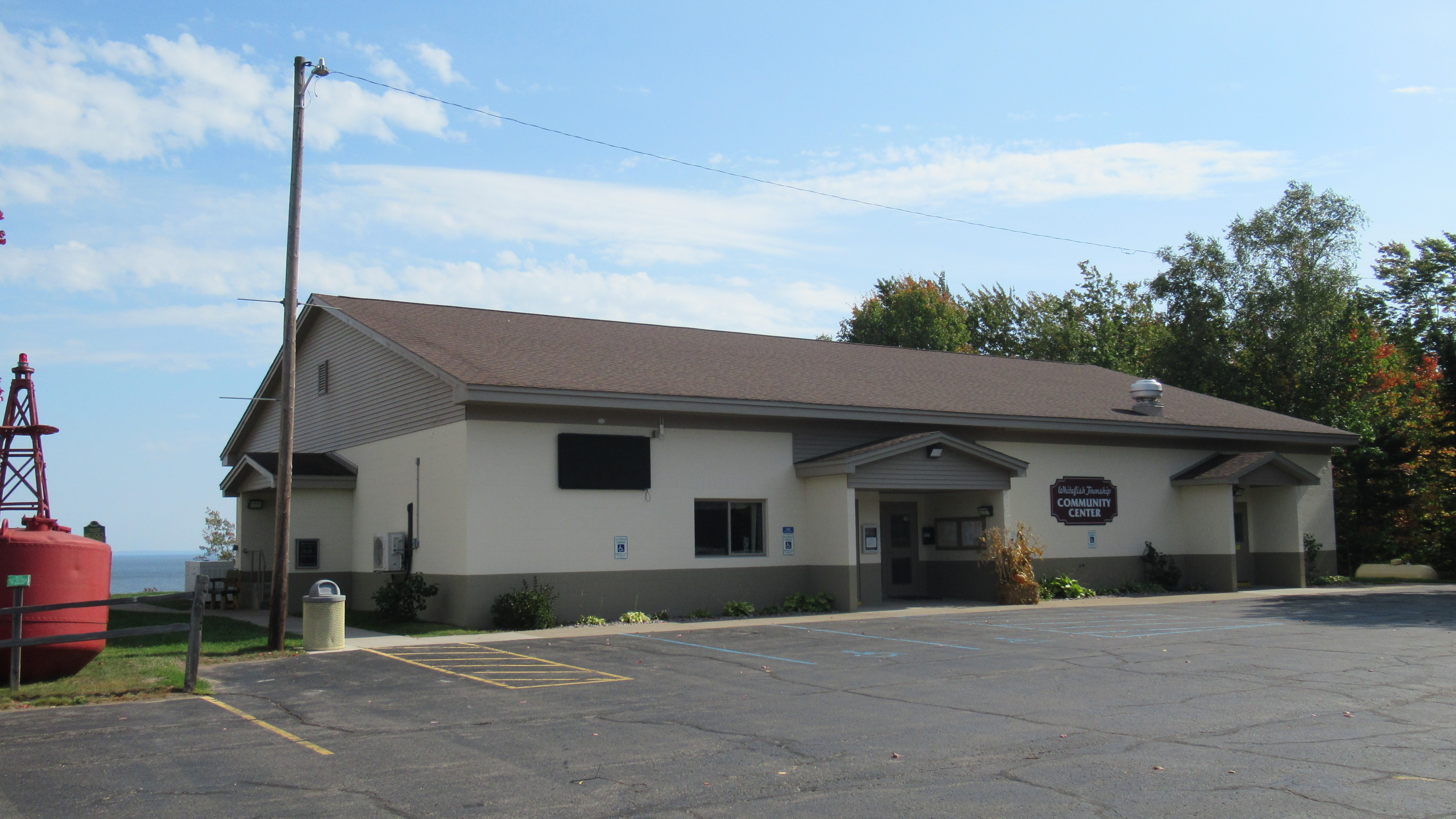
- Township Community Center in Paradise

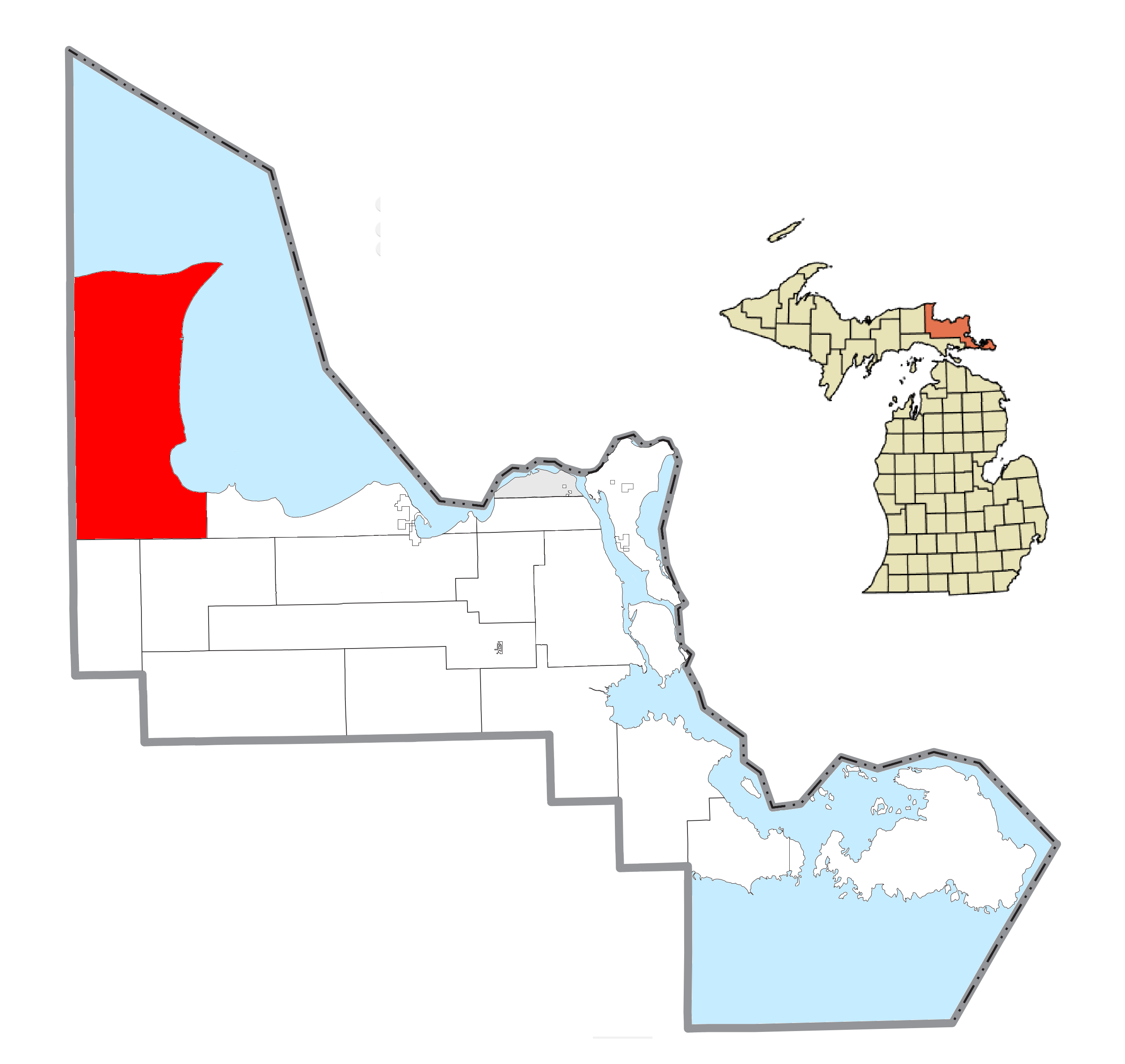
- Location within Chippewa County

- Location within the state of Michigan Location within the United States
- Coordinates: 46°37′17″N 85°05′23″W
- Country: United States
- State: Michigan
- County: Chippewa
- Organized: 1888

Government
  - Supervisor: Frank Lada
  - Clerk: Glenn Gomery

Area
  - Total: 293.64 sq mi (760.5 km^{2})
  - Land: 241.50 sq mi (625.5 km^{2})
  - Water: 52.14 sq mi (135.0 km^{2})
- Elevation: 686 ft (209 m)

Population (2020)
  - Total: 474
  - Density: 1.96/sq mi (0.76/km^{2})
- Time zone: UTC-5 (Eastern (EST))
  - Summer (DST): UTC-4 (EDT)
- ZIP code(s): 49728 (Eckerman); 49748 (Hulbert); 49768 (Paradise)
- Area code: 906
- FIPS code: 26-86700
- GNIS feature ID: 1627260
- Website: https://whitefishtownshipmi.gov/

Whitefish Township Informational Designation
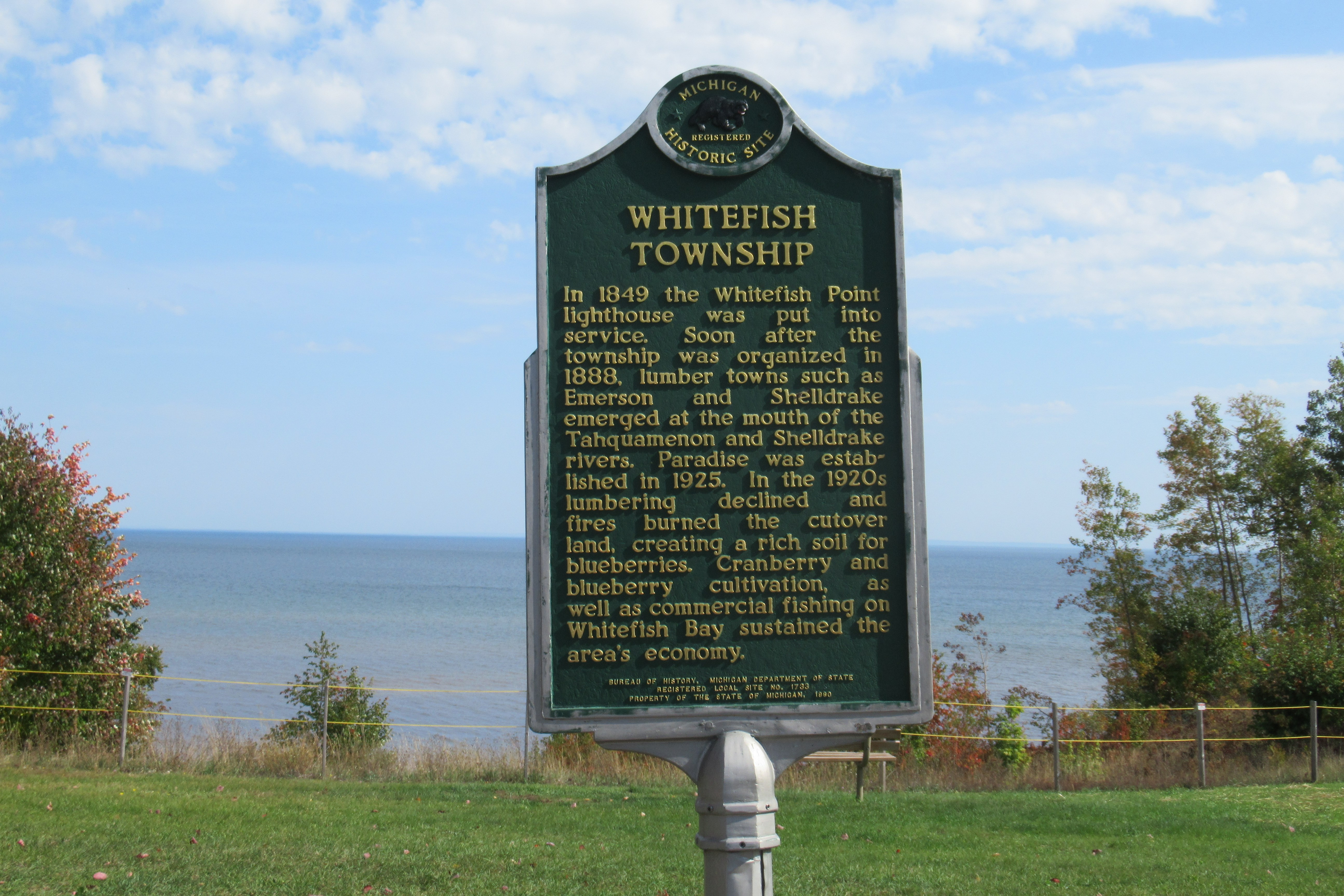
- Interactive map of Whitefish Township; Informational Designation
- 46°36′29″N 85°02′17″W
- Location: 7052 M-123; Paradise, Michigan 49768

Michigan State Historic Site
- Designated: March 15, 1990

Whitefish Township is a civil township of Chippewa County in the U.S. state of Michigan. The population was 474 at the 2020 census.

With a land area of 241.50 square miles (625.48 km^{2}), Whitefish Township is the sixth-largest municipality in the state by land area and among the least-densely populated. Located along Whitefish Bay on the shores of Lake Superior, the township contains Whitefish Point Light and the Great Lakes Shipwreck Museum, as well as portions of Tahquamenon Falls State Park.

== Geography ==
According to the U.S. Census Bureau, the township has a total area of 293.64 square miles (760.52 km^{2}), of which 241.50 square miles (625.48 km^{2}) is land and 52.14 square miles (135.04 km^{2}) (17.76%) is water. Whitefish Township is the sixth-largest municipality by land area in the state after the townships of McMillan, Marenisco, Hiawatha, Watersmeet, and L'Anse.

Whitefish Township occupies the northwest corner of Chippewa County in the Upper Peninsula. It is on the shores of Lake Superior to the north with Whitefish Bay to the east. Whitefish Point forms the northern tip of the township and also includes Vermilion Point to the west. The township of Bay Mills, Chippewa, and Hulbert are to the south and southeast, while McMillan Township in Luce County borders to the west.

The mouth of the Tahquamenon River is within the township. The eastern portion of Tahquamenon Falls State Park, including the Lower Tahquamenon Falls, is within Whitefish Township, while a smaller portion of the state park extends west into McMillan Township. The township also contains Whitefish Point Light, the Great Lakes Shipwreck Museum, the Whitefish Point Bird Observatory, and the Whitefish Point Unit of the Seney National Wildlife Refuge.

=== Major highways ===
- M-123 runs south–north through the township before turning east within the community of Paradise.
- Whitefish Bay National Forest Scenic Byway (Lake Superior Shoreline Road) enters briefly in the southern portion of the township before having its western terminus at M-123.

== Communities ==
- Emerson is an uninhabited unincorporated community located within the township at 46°33′23″N 85°01′45″W.
- Paradise is an unincorporated community located along M-123 at 46°37′39″N 85°02′15″W along the shores of Whitefish Bay. The Paradise 49768 ZIP Code serves the majority of Whitefish Township.
- Shelldrake is an unincorporated community located within the township at 46°40′40″N 85°02′01″W.
- Snug Harbor is an unincorporated community located along the Tahquamenon River at 46°33′19″N 85°04′11″W.
- Timberlost is an unincorporated community located along the Tahquamenon River at 46°33′41″N 85°10′14″W.
- Vermilion is an uninhabited unincorporated community and located at 46°45′47″N 85°08′56″W in the northern portion of the township at Vermilion Point along the shores of Lake Superior. The remote area was only previously surveyed until the Vermilion Lifesaving Station began operation in 1877. The small community grew to include mainly the servicemen at the station and their families. A post office in Vermilion was in operation from May 23, 1896 to October 31, 1922. When the station was closed in 1944, the community was abandoned. Only one original station structure exists along with several recently restored structures.
- Whitefish Landing is an unincorporated community located along the Tahquamenon River just upstream from Timberlost at 46°33′07″N 85°10′18″W.
- Whitefish Point is an unincorporated community located at 46°46′14″N 84°57′24″W at the northern end of the township near Whitefish Point. The Great Lakes Shipwreck Museum, Whitefish Point Bird Observatory and Whitefish Point Light are located in Whitefish Point. The community was settled in 1871 and had its own post office from September 24, 1877 to February 15, 1974. While the post office is no longer in operation, it was listed as a Michigan State Historic Site in 1979.

== Demographics ==
As of the census of 2000, there were 588 people, 285 households, and 196 families residing in the township. By 2020, its population was 474.

== Images ==
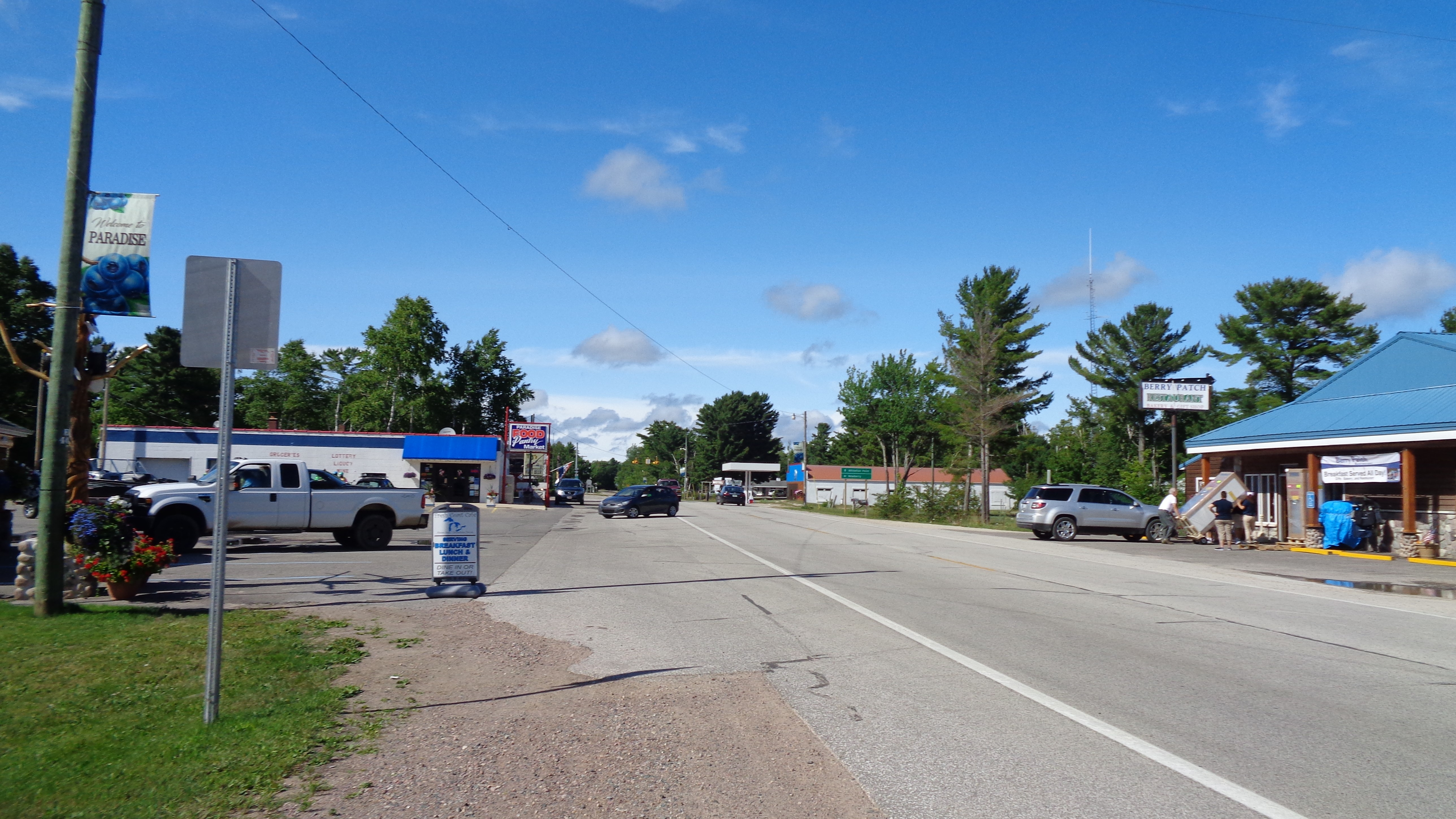
Unincorporated community of Paradise

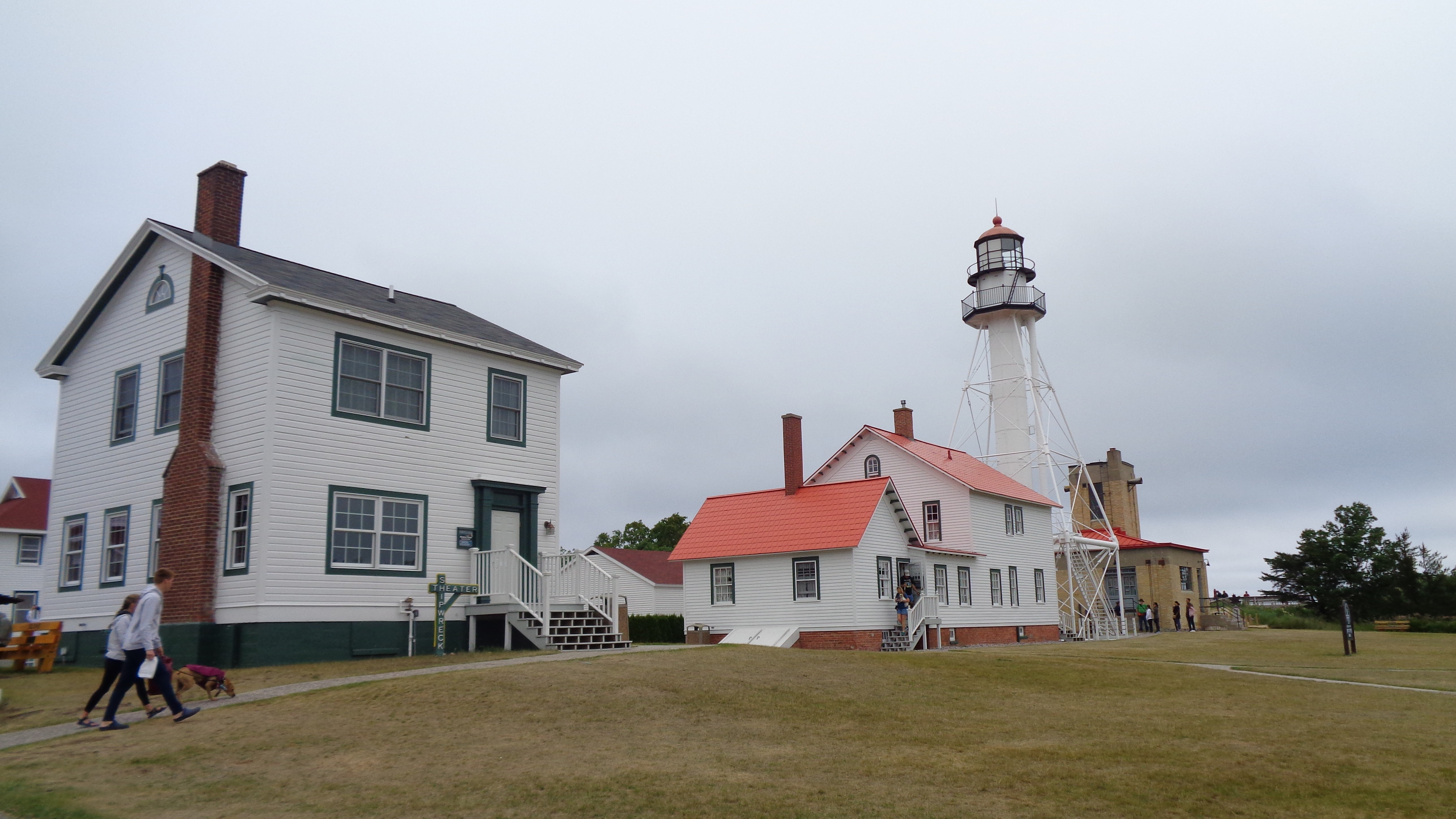
Whitefish Point Light

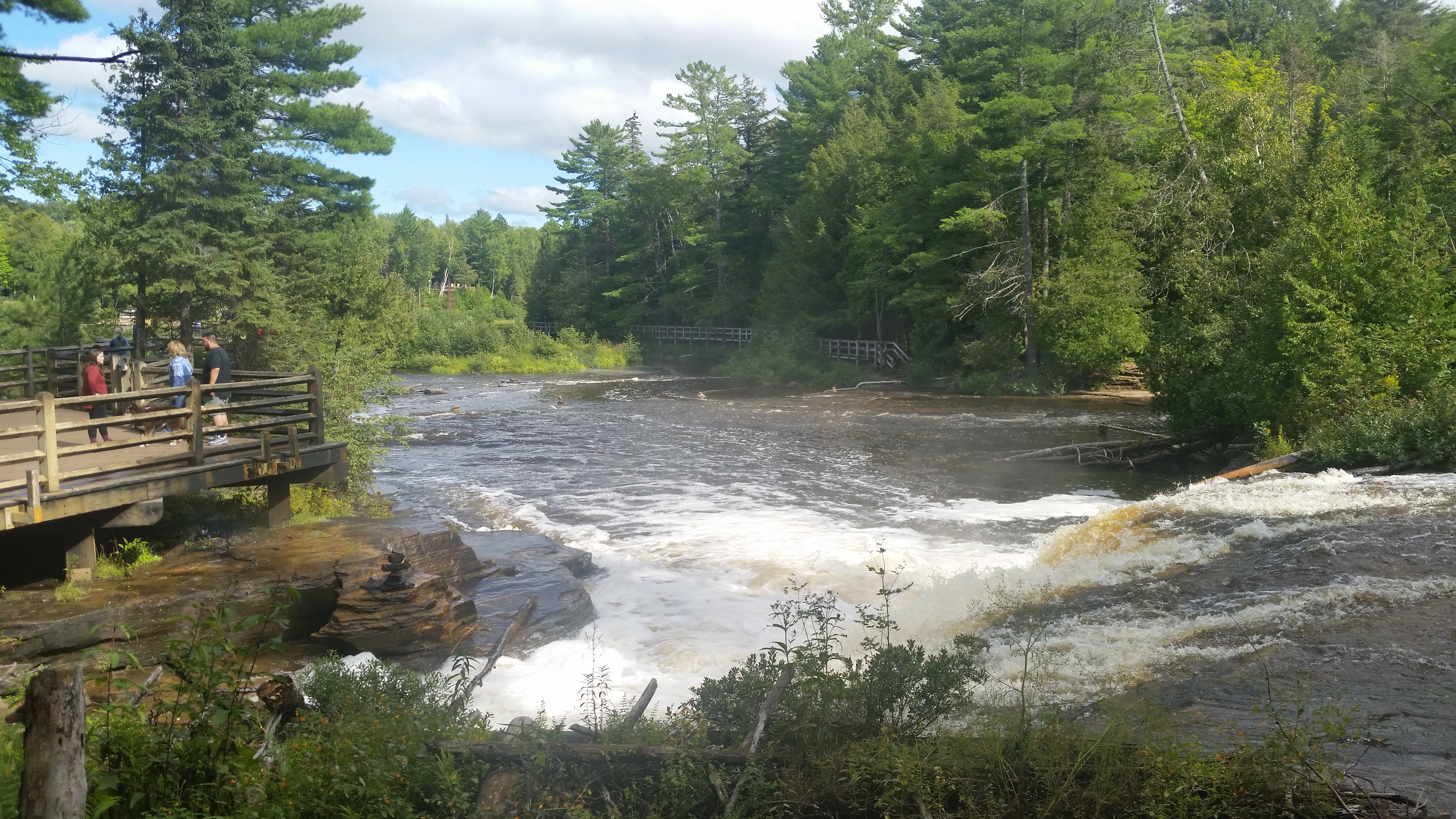
Lower Tahquamenon Falls
