= Chippewa Township =

Chippewa Township may refer to the following places in the United States:

- Chippewa Township, Mecosta County, Michigan
- Chippewa Township, Isabella County, Michigan
- Chippewa Township, Chippewa County, Michigan
- Chippewa Township, Ohio
- Chippewa Township, Pennsylvania
