= M-123 (Michigan highway) =

State highway in Michigan, United States

M-123

Route information
- Maintained by MDOT
- Length: 96.071 mi (154.611 km)
- Existed: 1936–present
- Tourist routes: Lake Superior Circle Tour; Tahquamenon Scenic Heritage Route

Major junctions
- South end: I-75 near St. Ignace
- H-40 in Trout Lake; M-28 near Eckerman; H-37 near Newberry
- North end: M-28 near Newberry

Location
- Country: United States
- State: Michigan
- Counties: Mackinac, Chippewa, Luce

Highway system
- Michigan State Trunkline Highway System; Interstate; US; State; Byways
← M-122	→ M-124

M-123 is a state trunkline highway in the eastern Upper Peninsula of the US state of Michigan. It is one of only a few highways in Michigan that curve around and form a U-shape. In fact, M-123 has three intersections with only two state trunklines; it meets M-28 twice as a result of its U-shaped routing. M-123 also has a rare signed concurrency with a County-Designated Highway in Michigan; in Trout Lake, there is a concurrency with H-40. All of M-123 north of M-28 is a Scenic Heritage Route within the Michigan Heritage Route system.

The highway was first designated before 1936 along a section of its current routing. Sections added since then encompass segments formerly belonging to US Highway 2 (US 2) and M-48. The last changes came to the highway in 1962 and 1963, when the northern end was extended and the southern end was truncated slightly.

== Route description ==
M-123 serves a thinly-populated section of the state. Much of the highway passes through the eastern unit of the Hiawatha National Forest. No part of the highway is listed on the National Highway System, a system of strategically important highways. The section of highway north of the two M-28 junctions is both a Michigan Scenic Heritage Route and part of the Lake Superior Circle Tour.

=== Rogers Park to Paradise ===
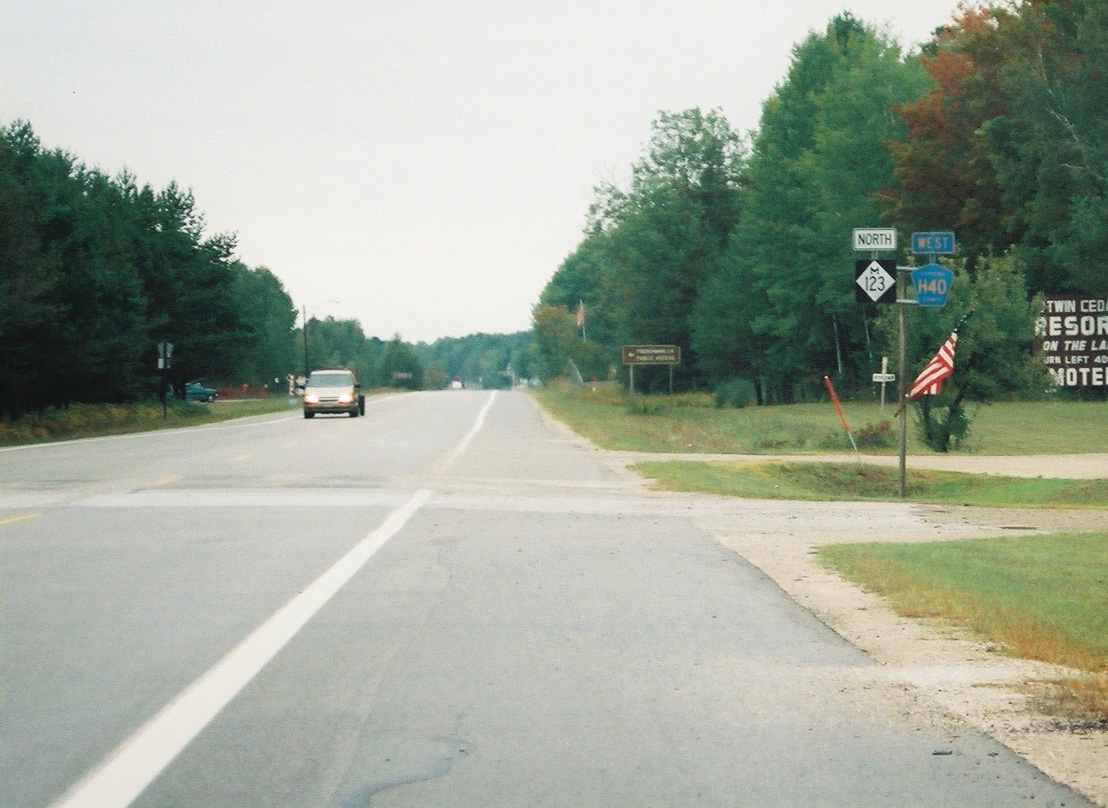
The concurrency of M-123 and H-40 in Trout Lake

The southern terminus of the highway's eastern leg is at exit 352 along Interstate 75 (I-75) north of St. Ignace in Rogers Park. The roadway also connects to County-Designated Highway H-63 (Old US 2) at the interchange. From the interchange north, the highway runs northwest as Tahquamenon Trail to the community of Allenville near Brevort Lake in Brevort Township. Here it meets H-57. Just north of Allenville, the trunkline crosses through the adjacent community of Moran. Allenville was a stop on the Detroit, Mackinac and Marquette Railroad (DM&M), and Moran was named after William B. Moran, one of the early settlement's founders. North of Moran the roadway runs parallel to the DM&M's abandoned rail right-of-way and passes by the Fred Dye Nature Sanctuary. Before crossing into Chippewa County, the highway passes through the community of Ozark, home of a rock quarry. North of the county line is the community of Trout Lake, where M-123 meets and merges with H-40 across railroad tracks and through town near Wegwaas, Frenchman and Carp lakes. Continuing to the north, the highway is renamed Deerfoot Road and serves the Three Lakes Campground, a unit of the Hiawatha National Forest, before meeting M-28 at Eckerman.

M-123 is designated as a Scenic Heritage Route north of M-28. Here it continues northwest to East–West Road and turns to run along the shores of Whitefish Bay and cross the Tahquamenon River near its mouth.

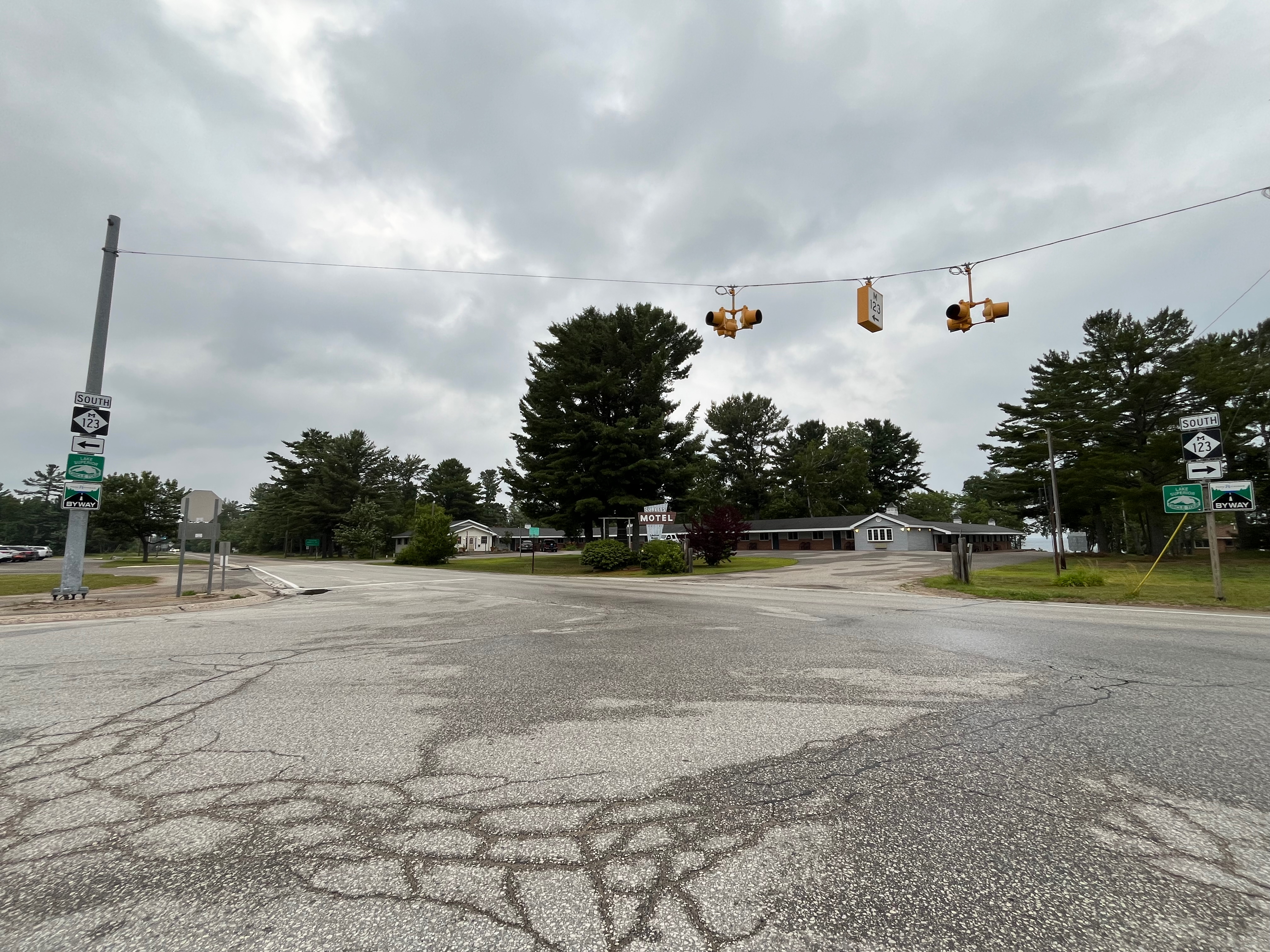
M-123 reversing directionality at an intersection in Paradise's both legs of the highway leave the intersection signed as southbound

Continuing along the bay as Whitefish Road, M-123 meets the community of Paradise, the northernmost point along the highway. It is here that M-123 intersects Whitefish Point Road, which continues north to Whitefish Point, home of the Great Lakes Shipwreck Museum. In either direction, M-123 runs southbound from Paradise, changing direction. Continuing east of Paradise, M-123 is the only paved road that serves the Tahquamenon Falls State Park and the Whitefish Point region.

=== Paradise to Newberry ===
East of Paradise, M-123 runs along the Tahquamenon River within Tahquamenon Falls State Park a 46,179-acre (18,688 ha) Michigan state park. It is the second largest of Michigan's state parks. Bordering on Lake Superior, most of the park is located within Chippewa County, with the western section of the park extending into Luce County. The park follows the Tahquamenon River as it passes over Tahquamenon Falls and drains into Whitefish Bay, Lake Superior.

Past the park, the highway is known as Falls Road in Luce County. The trunkline turns southwest at the county line. It runs south and west across Murphy Creek and the Auger River before intersecting with H-37 at Four Mile Corner. The highway crosses a branch of the Tahquamenon River one last time before becoming Newberry Avenue in the village of Newberry. The highest annual average daily traffic, a measure of traffic volume, was recorded by the Michigan Department of Transportation (MDOT) for M-123 in 2007 along Newberry Avenue at 7,500 vehicles. South of downtown, M-123 meets M-28 a second time west of Twin Lake, the terminus of the 96.1-mile (154.7 km) highway.

== History ==
The construction of M-123 started in the 1930s near Eckerman, the location of the current eastern M-28/M-123 junction. By 1936, M-123 was designated running north of M-28 on 10 miles (16 km) of hard-surface pavement. At this time, US 2 is routed along Worth Road and uses roadway later used by M-123 from Moran to Rogers Park, and M-48 was routed north of Newberry to Four Mile Corner. The first extension of M-123 southward from Eckerman, through Trout Lake to Rogers Park north of St. Ignace, came in 1954. Part of this routing in Trout Lake uses M-48 (now a portion of H-40). An additional extension is shown north to the Tahquamenon River Bridge, lengthening the highway to the north on the April 15, 1954 official state map. The section north to the Tahquamenon River Bridge is remarked on the October 1, 1954 state map as a county road, however. In 1957, M-123 was permanently extended north to the bridge, and in 1962 the final extension north to Paradise and south to Newberry was completed. From Four Mile Corner south, M-123 replaced M-117 to a new terminus at M-28 south of Newberry. The southernmost section of roadway between the I-75/US 2 freeway and H-63 (Old US 2) was transferred to Mackinac County for maintenance with the opening of the freeway in 1963.

On November 9, 2007, MDOT expanded the Tahquamenon Scenic Heritage Route designation previously applied to M-123. This expanded the designation to all of the highway north of M-28, recognizing it for its "outstanding natural beauty" and the scenic views of "rivers, forests, trails and Tahquamenon Falls State Park." Previously, the designation was limited to between Luce County Road 500 to Galloway Creek. The expansion was planned by the Eastern Upper Peninsula Regional Planning & Development Commission along with local governments and businesses.

== Major intersections ==
County	Location	mi	km	Destinations	Notes
Mackinac	Rogers Park	0.000	0.000	I-75 (Prentiss M. Brown Freeway) / LHCT – Sault Ste. Marie, St. Ignace	Exit 352 on I-75
Mackinac	Allenville	4.459	7.176	H-57 west (Brevort Lake Road)	
Chippewa	Trout Lake Township	21.824	35.122	H-40 east (Trout Lake Road) – Rudyard	Eastern terminus of H-40 (former M-48) concurrency
Chippewa	Trout Lake	22.491	36.196	H-40 west – Rexton	Western terminus of H-40 concurrency
Chippewa	Eckerman	33.566	54.019	M-28 / LSCT east – Newberry, Sault Ste. Marie	Eastern junction; the LSCT joins M-123
Chippewa	Whitefish Township	44.448	71.532	Whitefish Bay National Forest Scenic Byway (Lake Superior Shoreline Road)	Eastern terminus of WBNFSB
Chippewa	Paradise	55.435	89.214	Whitefish Point Road – Whitefish Point	M-123 changes from northbound to southbound
Luce	McMillan Township	88.094	141.774	H-37 north (CR 407) – Deer Park	
Luce	Newberry	96.071	154.611	M-28 / LSCT west – Munising, Sault Ste. Marie	LSCT continues westward along M-28
1.000 mi = 1.609 km; 1.000 km = 0.621 mi: Concurrency terminus
