= Trout Lake Township, Michigan =

- Civil township
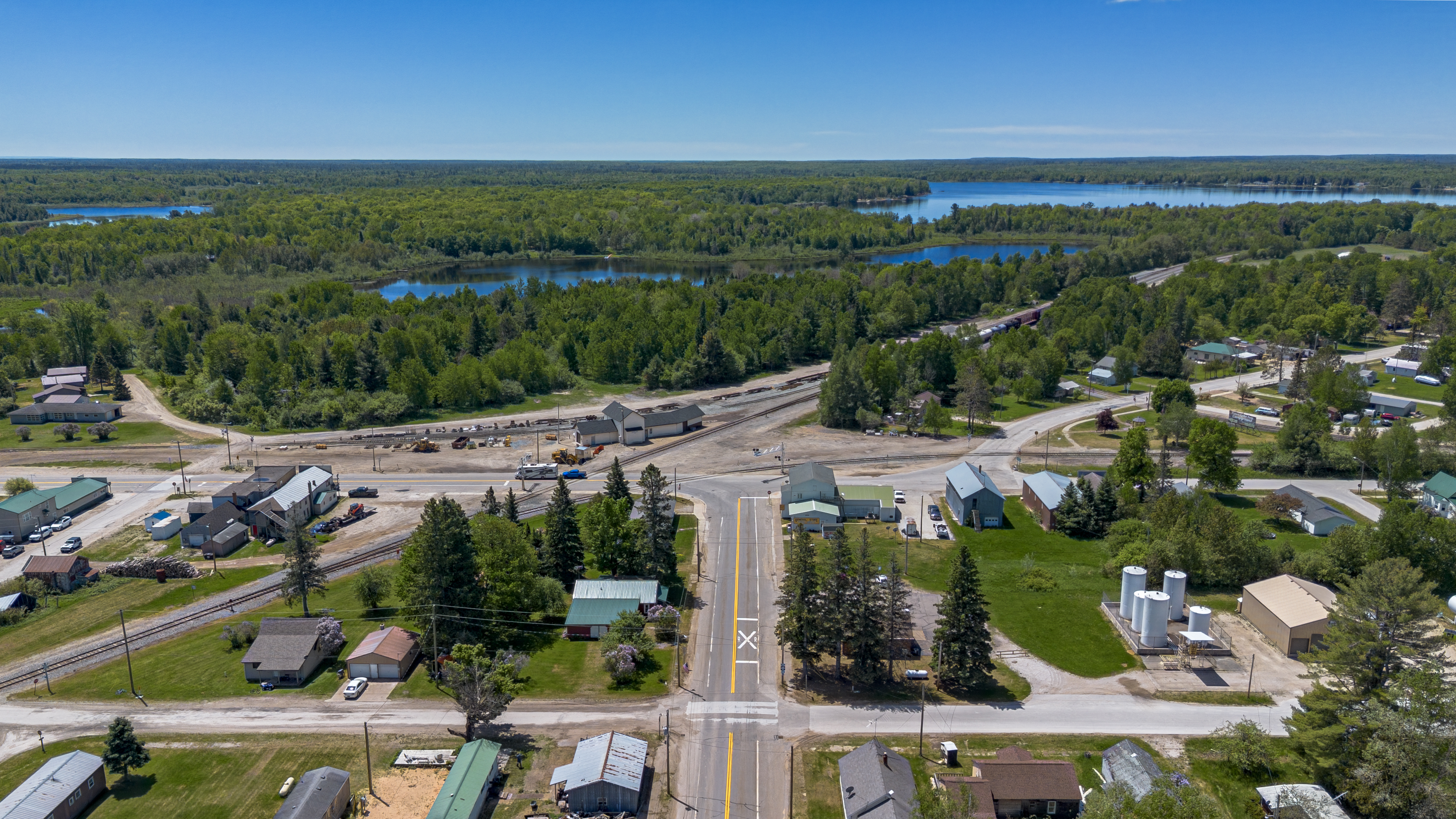
- Trout Lake Township in 2026

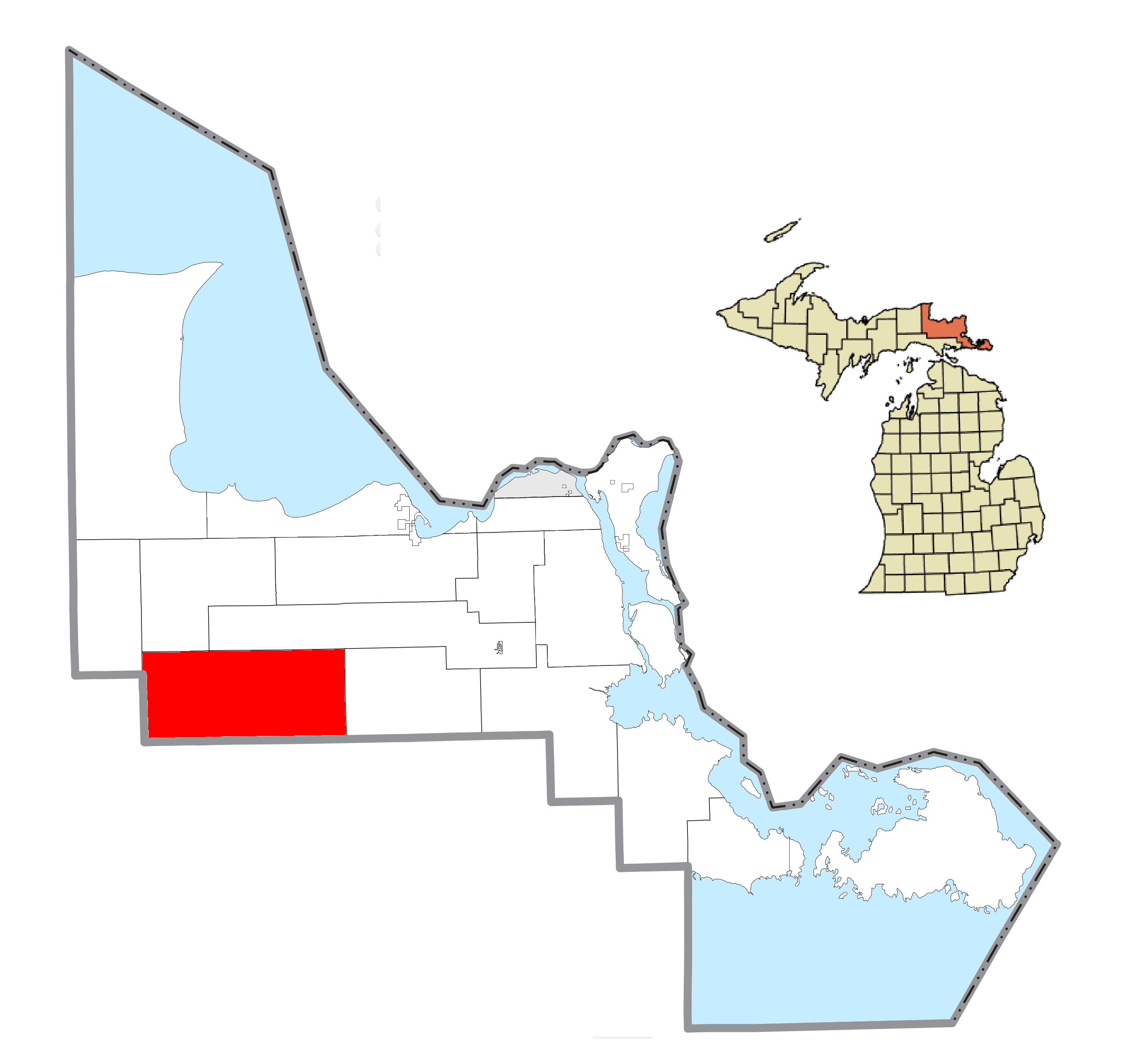
- Location within Chippewa County

- Location within the state of Michigan Location within the United States
- Coordinates: 46°11′55″N 84°57′47″W
- Country: United States
- State: Michigan
- County: Chippewa
- Established: 1888

Government
  - Supervisor: David Blake-Thomas
  - Clerk: David Hillman

Area
  - Total: 143.63 sq mi (372.00 km^{2})
  - Land: 141.39 sq mi (366.20 km^{2})
  - Water: 2.24 sq mi (5.80 km^{2})
- Elevation: 827 ft (252 m)

Population (2020)
  - Total: 332
  - Density: 2.35/sq mi (0.91/km^{2})
- Time zone: UTC-5 (Eastern (EST))
  - Summer (DST): UTC-4 (EDT)
- ZIP code(s): 49715 (Brimley); 49728 (Eckerman); 49760 (Moran); 49780 (Rudyard); 49793 (Trout Lake)
- Area code: 906
- FIPS code: 26-80600
- GNIS feature ID: 1627173
- Website: Official website

Trout Lake Township is a civil township of Chippewa County in the U.S. state of Michigan. The population was 332 at the 2020 census.

== Geography ==
According to the U.S. Census Bureau, the township has a total area of 143.63 square miles (372.00 km^{2}), of which 141.39 square miles (366.20 km^{2}) is land and 2.24 square miles (5.80 km^{2}) (1.56%) is water.

The township is in southwestern Chippewa County on the Upper Peninsula of Michigan and is bordered to the south and west by Mackinac County. The unincorporated community of Trout Lake is in the southwestern part of the township, near the lake of the same name.

=== Climate ===
Climate data for Trout Lake 1SW, Michigan (1991–2020 normals, extremes 1978–2017)
| Month | Jan | Feb | Mar | Apr | May | Jun | Jul | Aug | Sep | Oct | Nov | Dec | Year |
|---|---|---|---|---|---|---|---|---|---|---|---|---|---|
| Record high °F (°C) | 50 (10) | 56 (13) | 78 (26) | 80 (27) | 88 (31) | 91 (33) | 94 (34) | 96 (36) | 88 (31) | 80 (27) | 70 (21) | 60 (16) | 96 (36) |
| Mean daily maximum °F (°C) | 24.8 (−4.0) | 27.8 (−2.3) | 38.0 (3.3) | 50.4 (10.2) | 64.6 (18.1) | 73.3 (22.9) | 76.5 (24.7) | 75.2 (24.0) | 67.4 (19.7) | 53.8 (12.1) | 40.5 (4.7) | 30.3 (−0.9) | 51.9 (11.1) |
| Daily mean °F (°C) | 16.9 (−8.4) | 18.4 (−7.6) | 27.2 (−2.7) | 39.5 (4.2) | 52.3 (11.3) | 61.5 (16.4) | 65.4 (18.6) | 64.8 (18.2) | 57.6 (14.2) | 45.5 (7.5) | 34.0 (1.1) | 23.7 (−4.6) | 42.2 (5.7) |
| Mean daily minimum °F (°C) | 8.9 (−12.8) | 9.0 (−12.8) | 16.4 (−8.7) | 28.6 (−1.9) | 40.0 (4.4) | 49.8 (9.9) | 54.4 (12.4) | 54.3 (12.4) | 47.7 (8.7) | 37.2 (2.9) | 27.4 (−2.6) | 17.1 (−8.3) | 32.6 (0.3) |
| Record low °F (°C) | −38 (−39) | −43 (−42) | −31 (−35) | −6 (−21) | 12 (−11) | 22 (−6) | 23 (−5) | 28 (−2) | 20 (−7) | 15 (−9) | −3 (−19) | −30 (−34) | −43 (−42) |
| Average precipitation inches (mm) | 1.91 (49) | 1.26 (32) | 1.99 (51) | 2.68 (68) | 2.72 (69) | 2.84 (72) | 3.45 (88) | 3.07 (78) | 4.02 (102) | 4.28 (109) | 3.01 (76) | 2.29 (58) | 33.52 (851) |
| Average snowfall inches (cm) | 29.9 (76) | 17.7 (45) | 12.3 (31) | 3.9 (9.9) | 0.1 (0.25) | 0.0 (0.0) | 0.0 (0.0) | 0.0 (0.0) | 0.0 (0.0) | 0.5 (1.3) | 8.8 (22) | 25.3 (64) | 98.5 (250) |
| Average precipitation days (≥ 0.01 in) | 14.7 | 9.7 | 8.1 | 9.5 | 10.8 | 10.9 | 11.9 | 10.5 | 12.7 | 15.0 | 12.7 | 14.4 | 140.9 |
| Average snowy days (≥ 0.1 in) | 13.9 | 8.8 | 4.5 | 2.0 | 0.1 | 0.0 | 0.0 | 0.0 | 0.0 | 0.5 | 4.2 | 9.7 | 43.7 |
Source: NOAA

== Demographics ==
Historical population
| Census | Pop. | Note | %± |
|---|---|---|---|
| 1890 | 112 | | — |
| 1900 | 307 | | 174.1% |
| 1910 | 912 | | 197.1% |
| 1920 | 537 | | −41.1% |
| 1930 | 450 | | −16.2% |
| 1940 | 533 | | 18.4% |
| 1950 | 378 | | −29.1% |
| 1960 | 400 | | 5.8% |
| 1970 | 306 | | −23.5% |
| 1980 | 386 | | 26.1% |
| 1990 | 429 | | 11.1% |
| 2000 | 465 | | 8.4% |
| 2010 | 384 | | −17.4% |
| 2020 | 332 | | −13.5% |
U.S. Decennial Census

As of the census of 2000, there were 465 people, 212 households, and 143 families residing in the township. By 2020, its population was 332.

== Gallery ==
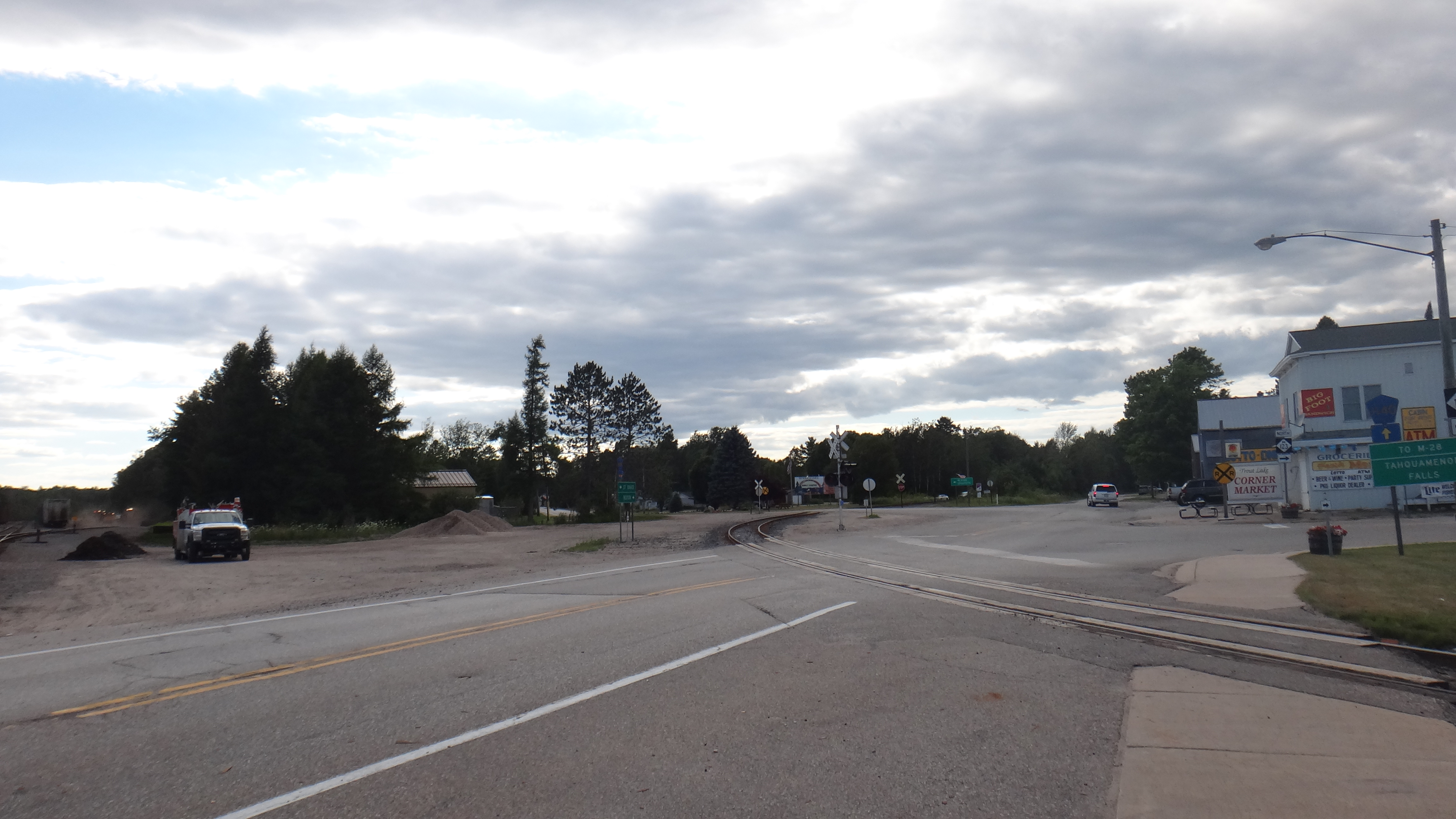
Unincorporated community of Trout Lake

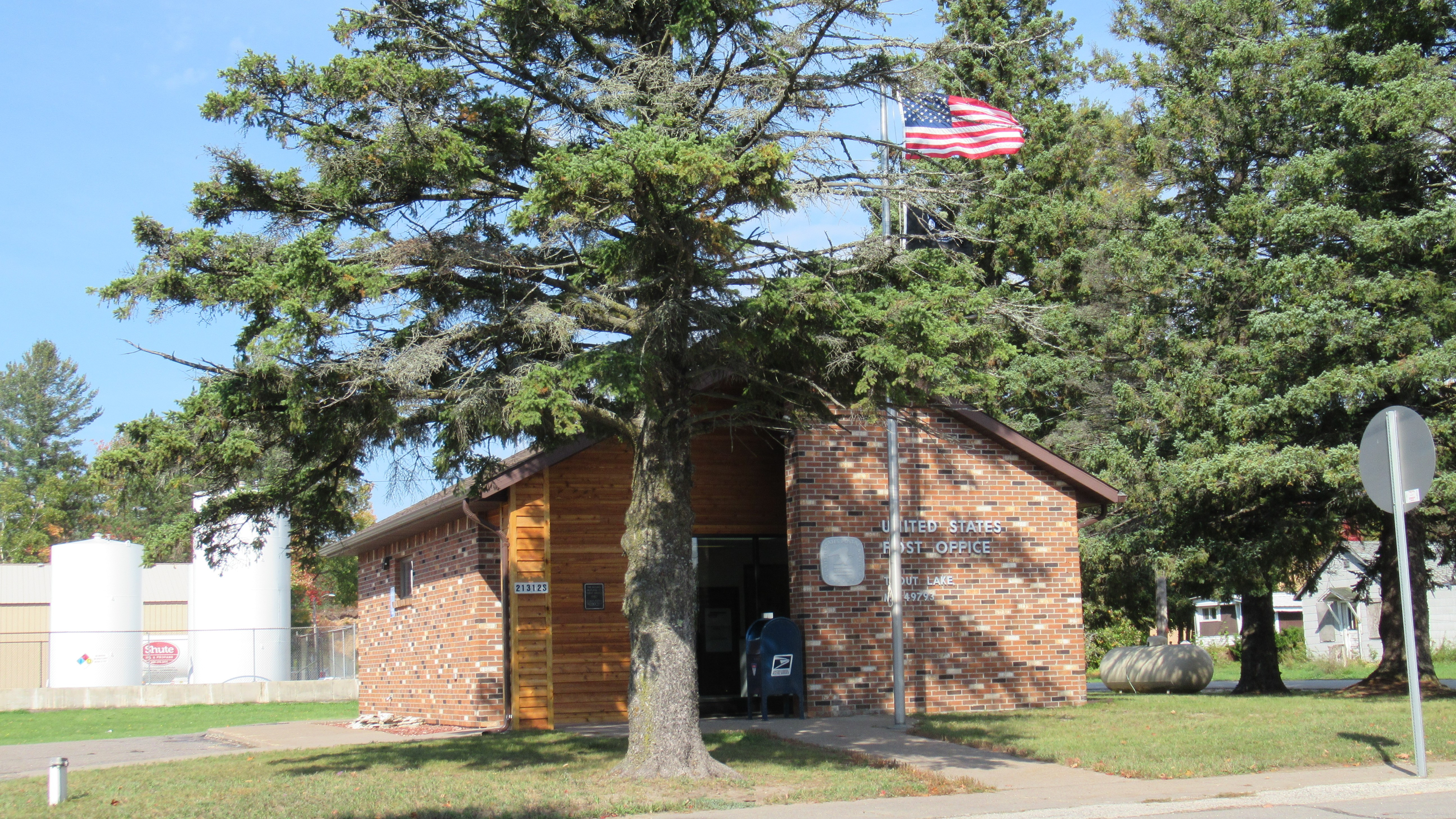
U.S. Post Office in Trout Lake

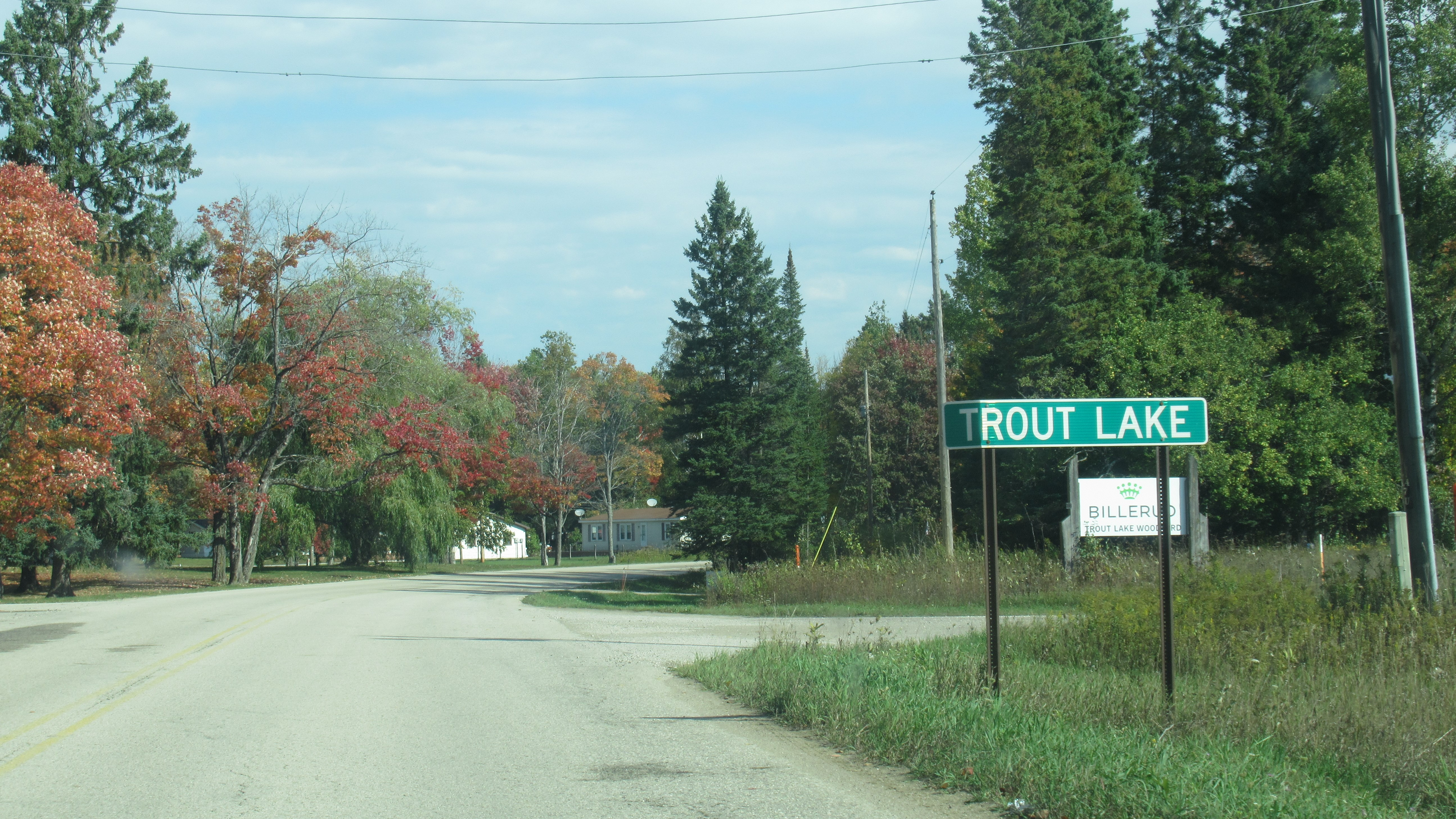
Community of Trout Lake signage

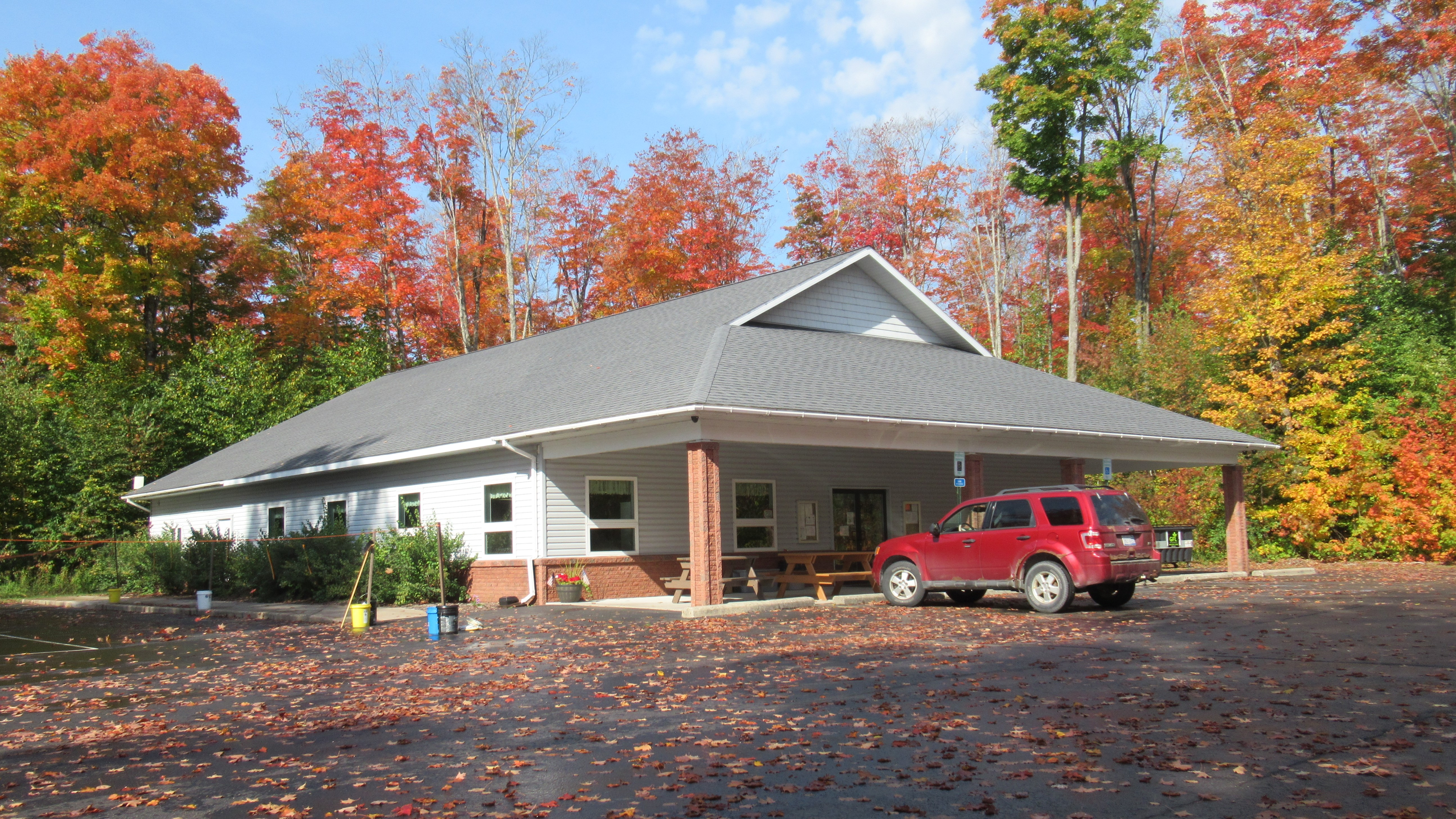
Trout Lake Township Hall
