= Whitefish Point =

Point on the Upper Peninsula of Michigan

- Cape
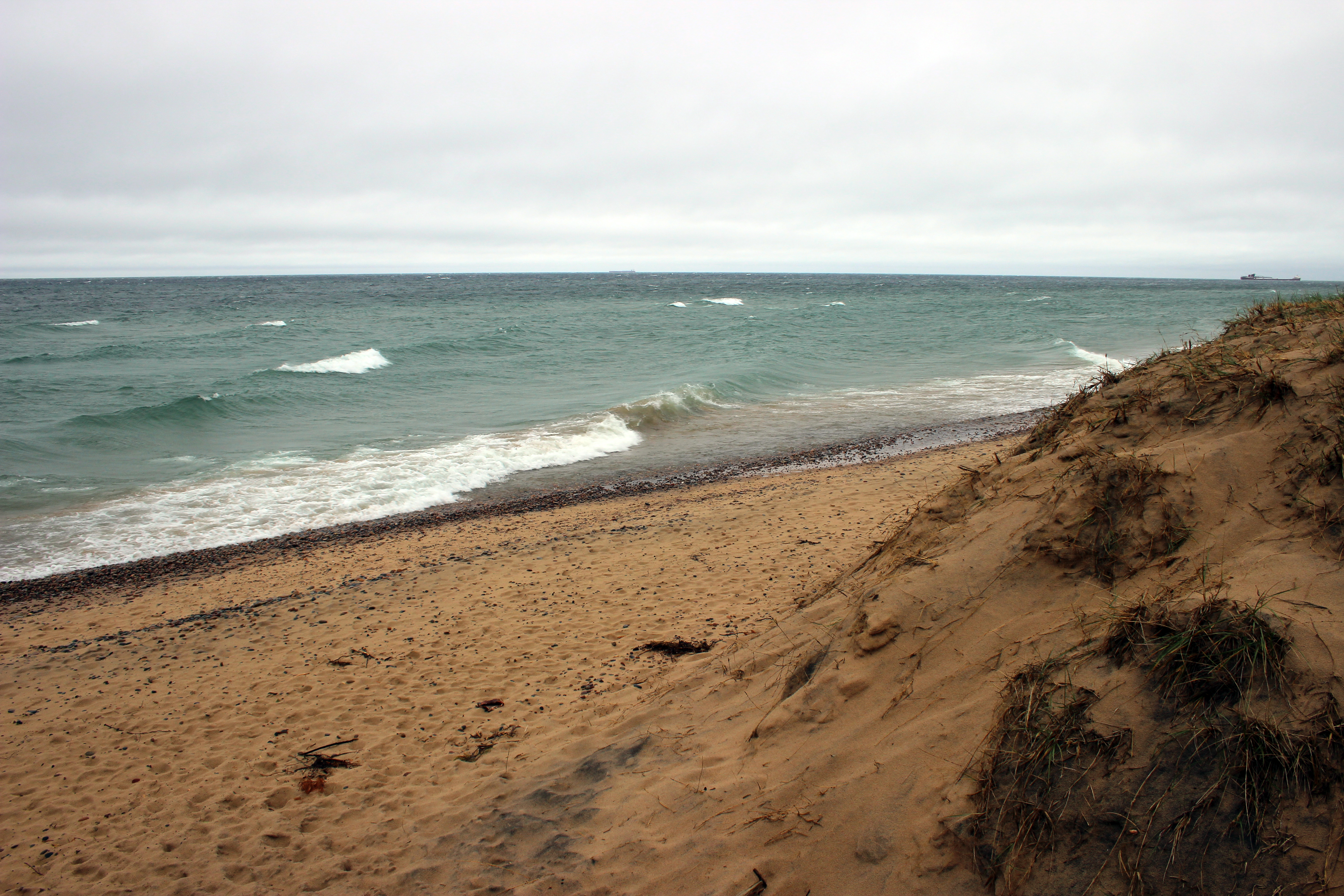

- Location within the state of Michigan
- Coordinates: 46°45′54″N 84°57′50″W
- Location: Whitefish Township, Michigan
- Offshore water bodies: Lake Superior; Whitefish Bay
- Elevation: 183 m (602 ft)

Whitefish Point is a cape of Michigan's Upper Peninsula, United States, marking the entry point of Whitefish Bay. It is 11 miles (18 km) north of the unincorporated community of Paradise, Michigan.

Whitefish Point is known for the Great Lakes Shipwreck Museum, its Lake Superior shoreline, the Whitefish Point Lighthouse and as a prime birding area. Whitefish Point is a designated Important Bird Area. The Whitefish Point Bird Observatory, an affiliate of the Michigan Audubon Society, operates a research and education facility at Whitefish Point.

At 17 miles away, Whitefish Point is the nearest navigation mark to the wreckage of the ore freighter SS Edmund Fitzgerald, which sank in 1975. Whitefish Point remains one of the most dangerous shipping areas in the Great Lakes, Known as the graveyard of the Great Lakes, more vessels have been lost in the Whitefish Point area than any other part of Lake Superior.

The Whitefish Point Underwater Preserve protects the shipwrecks in a portion of the bay for future generations of sports divers.

The Point is a popular place for rock collectors, ship watchers, and bird watching. Whitefish Point's land and water provides a natural corridor for birds that makes it a migratory route of world significance. It is a designated Important Bird Area where the Whitefish Point Bird Observatory conducts important research.

Whitefish Point is the home of a former United States Coast Guard station.

== Climate ==
Climate data for Whitefish Point, Michigan, 1991–2020 normals, 1900-2020 extremes: 622ft (190m)
Month	Jan	Feb	Mar	Apr	May	Jun	Jul	Aug	Sep	Oct	Nov	Dec	Year
Record high °F (°C)	49 (9)	51 (11)	76 (24)	76 (24)	85 (29)	95 (35)	98 (37)	95 (35)	90 (32)	86 (30)	70 (21)	57 (14)	98 (37)
Mean maximum °F (°C)	37.8 (3.2)	41.0 (5.0)	49.8 (9.9)	61.8 (16.6)	74.9 (23.8)	81.7 (27.6)	82.6 (28.1)	83.8 (28.8)	80.3 (26.8)	68.6 (20.3)	53.5 (11.9)	42.2 (5.7)	86.4 (30.2)
Mean daily maximum °F (°C)	24.6 (−4.1)	26.3 (−3.2)	34.5 (1.4)	44.6 (7.0)	57.9 (14.4)	67.8 (19.9)	72.7 (22.6)	74.0 (23.3)	67.0 (19.4)	53.6 (12.0)	40.6 (4.8)	30.5 (−0.8)	49.5 (9.7)
Daily mean °F (°C)	18.6 (−7.4)	18.8 (−7.3)	26.1 (−3.3)	36.6 (2.6)	48.0 (8.9)	57.3 (14.1)	63.3 (17.4)	65.1 (18.4)	58.8 (14.9)	47.0 (8.3)	35.2 (1.8)	25.6 (−3.6)	41.7 (5.4)
Mean daily minimum °F (°C)	12.5 (−10.8)	11.4 (−11.4)	17.6 (−8.0)	28.6 (−1.9)	38.2 (3.4)	46.8 (8.2)	54.0 (12.2)	56.2 (13.4)	50.7 (10.4)	40.5 (4.7)	29.9 (−1.2)	20.7 (−6.3)	33.9 (1.1)
Mean minimum °F (°C)	−7.3 (−21.8)	−7.9 (−22.2)	−5.8 (−21.0)	15.1 (−9.4)	27.4 (−2.6)	34.1 (1.2)	40.7 (4.8)	42.7 (5.9)	34.6 (1.4)	26.2 (−3.2)	16.1 (−8.8)	2.1 (−16.6)	−9.6 (−23.1)
Record low °F (°C)	−25 (−32)	−30 (−34)	−26 (−32)	−8 (−22)	20 (−7)	27 (−3)	33 (1)	30 (−1)	26 (−3)	12 (−11)	−5 (−21)	−15 (−26)	−30 (−34)
Average precipitation inches (mm)	2.07 (53)	1.57 (40)	1.59 (40)	2.15 (55)	2.56 (65)	2.95 (75)	3.51 (89)	3.13 (80)	3.76 (96)	4.44 (113)	2.73 (69)	2.37 (60)	32.83 (835)
Average snowfall inches (cm)	38.80 (98.6)	21.50 (54.6)	12.20 (31.0)	4.50 (11.4)	0.10 (0.25)	0.00 (0.00)	0.00 (0.00)	0.00 (0.00)	0.00 (0.00)	1.20 (3.0)	11.70 (29.7)	31.00 (78.7)	121 (307.25)
Source 1: NOAA
Source 2: XMACIS (records & monthly max/mins)
