= Tahquamenon Falls State Park =

State park in Michigan, United States

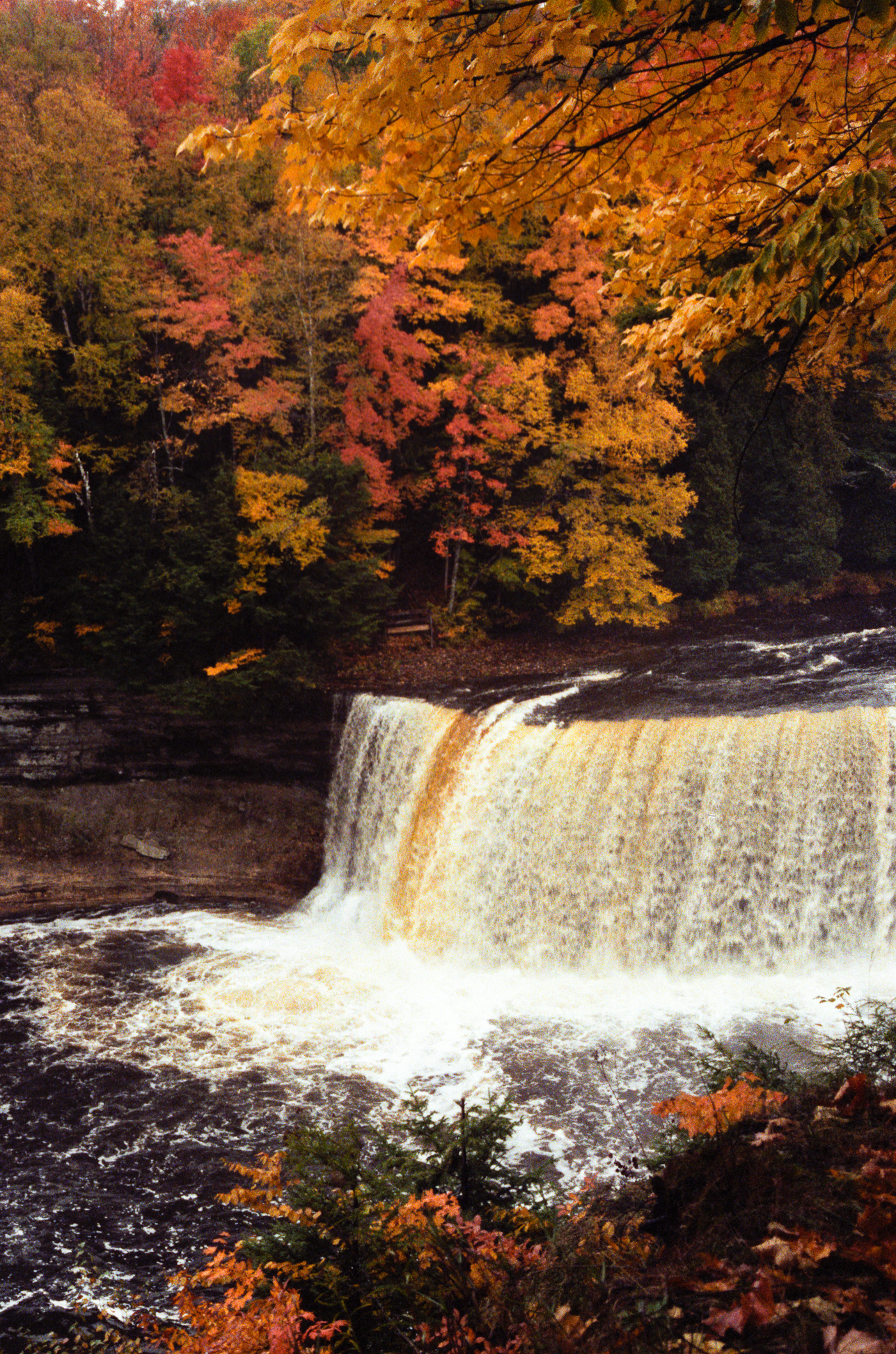
- Tahquamenon Upper Falls

- Location within Michigan
- Location: Chippewa and Luce counties, Michigan, United States
- Nearest town: Paradise, Michigan
- Coordinates: 46°36′13″N 85°12′26″W
- Area: 46,179 acres (18,688 ha)
- Elevation: 623 feet (190 m)
- Established: 1947
- Administrator: Michigan Department of Natural Resources
- Website: Official website

The Tahquamenon Falls State Park is a 46,179-acre (18,688 ha) public recreation area in the U.S. state of Michigan. It is the second largest of Michigan's state parks. Bordering on Lake Superior, most of the park is located within Whitefish Township in Chippewa County, with the western section of the park extending into McMillan Township in Luce County. The nearest town of any size is Paradise.

The park follows the Tahquamenon River as it passes over Tahquamenon Falls and drains into Whitefish Bay, Lake Superior. The Tahquamenon Falls include a single 50-foot (15 m) drop, the Upper Falls, plus the cascades and rapids collectively called the Lower Falls. During the late-spring runoff, the river drains as much as 50,000 U.S. gallons (190,000 L) of water per second, making the upper falls the second most voluminous vertical waterfall east of the Mississippi River, after only Niagara Falls.

Tahquamenon Falls is also called Rootbeer Falls because of its golden-brown color, caused by tannins from cedar swamps that drain into the river. In winter, the ice that accumulates around and in the falls is often colored in shades of green and blue.

The park receives as many as 500,000 visitors per year, many of whom drive in on the state park's only paved road, M-123. M-123 intersects with Interstate 75 at exit 352. The North Country Trail passes through the park.

== Bridge ==
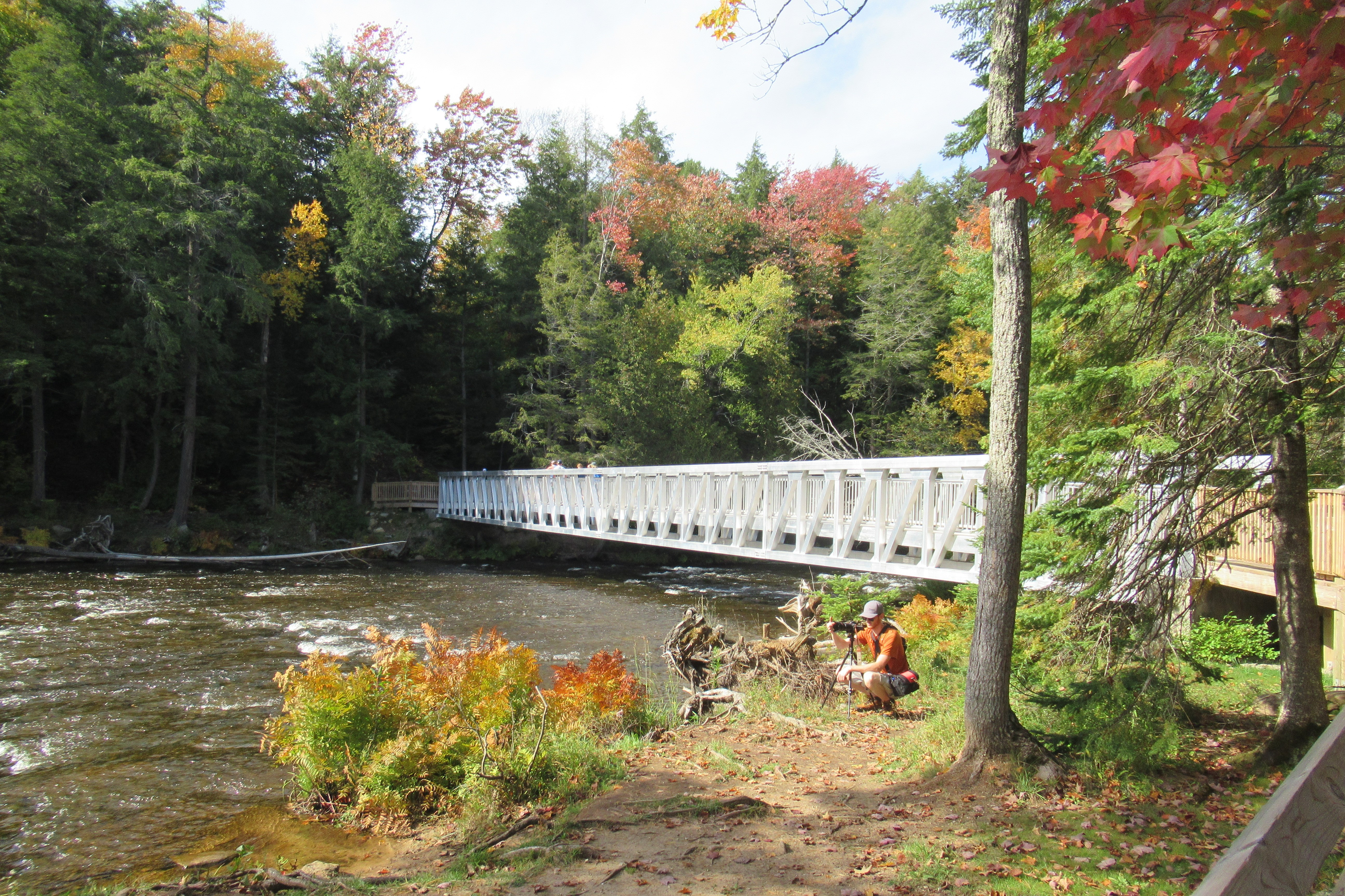
Ronald A. Olson Island Bridge

In September 2021, the Tahquamenon Falls State Park installed a bridge to the island at the lower falls to allow easy access for people with disabilities. Before adding this new feature, the island was only accessible by rowboat. The $250,000 pedestrian bridge can handle 4,000 pounds, includes railings, and provides views of angles of the running water that have not been seen before. Four aluminum sections that comprise the bridge came from Florida. To reach the remote location, a helicopter brought all four sections to the falls. Skilled contractors were then able to bolt all four parts together. Keeping the beauty of nature in mind, the bridge was constructed so that it would not obstruct the scenery of the falls.

There have been several controversies brought up regarding the construction of the bridge. Those against the bridge worry that it will diminish the rowboat experience and take away from the beauty of the park. In contrast, there are many in support of the bridge and its improved access for people with disabilities, improved viewing points, and improved emergency access.

The bridge is dedicated to and named after Ronald A. Olson, chief of Michigan's Department of National Resources Parks and Recreation Division. Olson is known for bringing people together and encouraging visitors to enjoy the natural resources that Michigan has to offer.

== Activities and amenities ==
Much of the park is undeveloped but it has approximately 20 miles (32 km) of hiking trails. Row boats and canoes may be rented to use to approach the lower falls. The upper falls are accessible from the visitor center parking lot via a paved walking trail and a seasonal shuttle service. The park's campgrounds include some 280 campsites. A new park store, boat rental building, and public restrooms were expected to open in spring 2023.

== Climate ==
Climate data for Tahquamenon Falls, Michigan, 1991–2020 normals, extremes 1968–present
Month	Jan	Feb	Mar	Apr	May	Jun	Jul	Aug	Sep	Oct	Nov	Dec	Year
Record high °F (°C)	47 (8)	56 (13)	82 (28)	85 (29)	92 (33)	94 (34)	98 (37)	95 (35)	92 (33)	81 (27)	73 (23)	56 (13)	98 (37)
Mean maximum °F (°C)	38.4 (3.6)	42.3 (5.7)	55.0 (12.8)	67.3 (19.6)	82.5 (28.1)	86.9 (30.5)	88.1 (31.2)	87.6 (30.9)	82.5 (28.1)	71.8 (22.1)	57.1 (13.9)	45.0 (7.2)	90.4 (32.4)
Mean daily maximum °F (°C)	23.0 (−5.0)	25.3 (−3.7)	34.9 (1.6)	47.0 (8.3)	62.3 (16.8)	72.3 (22.4)	76.1 (24.5)	75.2 (24.0)	67.5 (19.7)	53.1 (11.7)	39.9 (4.4)	29.1 (−1.6)	50.5 (10.3)
Daily mean °F (°C)	15.2 (−9.3)	15.6 (−9.1)	23.5 (−4.7)	35.8 (2.1)	49.3 (9.6)	58.8 (14.9)	63.0 (17.2)	62.2 (16.8)	55.1 (12.8)	43.2 (6.2)	32.2 (0.1)	22.1 (−5.5)	39.7 (4.3)
Mean daily minimum °F (°C)	7.5 (−13.6)	6.0 (−14.4)	12.1 (−11.1)	24.6 (−4.1)	36.3 (2.4)	45.4 (7.4)	50.0 (10.0)	49.1 (9.5)	42.7 (5.9)	33.3 (0.7)	24.6 (−4.1)	15.1 (−9.4)	28.9 (−1.7)
Mean minimum °F (°C)	−11.6 (−24.2)	−13.3 (−25.2)	−11.4 (−24.1)	10.4 (−12.0)	23.9 (−4.5)	30.0 (−1.1)	37.2 (2.9)	36.4 (2.4)	28.1 (−2.2)	21.5 (−5.8)	7.6 (−13.6)	−3.2 (−19.6)	−18.5 (−28.1)
Record low °F (°C)	−24 (−31)	−36 (−38)	−30 (−34)	−13 (−25)	14 (−10)	19 (−7)	28 (−2)	25 (−4)	21 (−6)	14 (−10)	−19 (−28)	−23 (−31)	−36 (−38)
Average precipitation inches (mm)	3.59 (91)	2.49 (63)	2.43 (62)	2.79 (71)	2.58 (66)	3.10 (79)	3.69 (94)	3.13 (80)	4.06 (103)	4.57 (116)	3.51 (89)	3.64 (92)	39.58 (1,006)
Average snowfall inches (cm)	46.1 (117)	36.5 (93)	16.3 (41)	9.7 (25)	0.2 (0.51)	0.0 (0.0)	0.0 (0.0)	0.0 (0.0)	0.0 (0.0)	1.2 (3.0)	17.2 (44)	42.7 (108)	169.9 (431.51)
Average precipitation days (≥ 0.01 in)	18.6	14.8	10.2	9.0	10.5	9.6	10.2	8.9	12.0	15.0	14.0	16.1	148.9
Average snowy days (≥ 0.1 in)	18.0	13.7	7.5	3.4	0.1	0.0	0.0	0.0	0.0	1.0	7.6	13.9	65.2
Source 1: NOAA
Source 2: XMACIS2
