= Paradise, Michigan =

- Unincorporated community
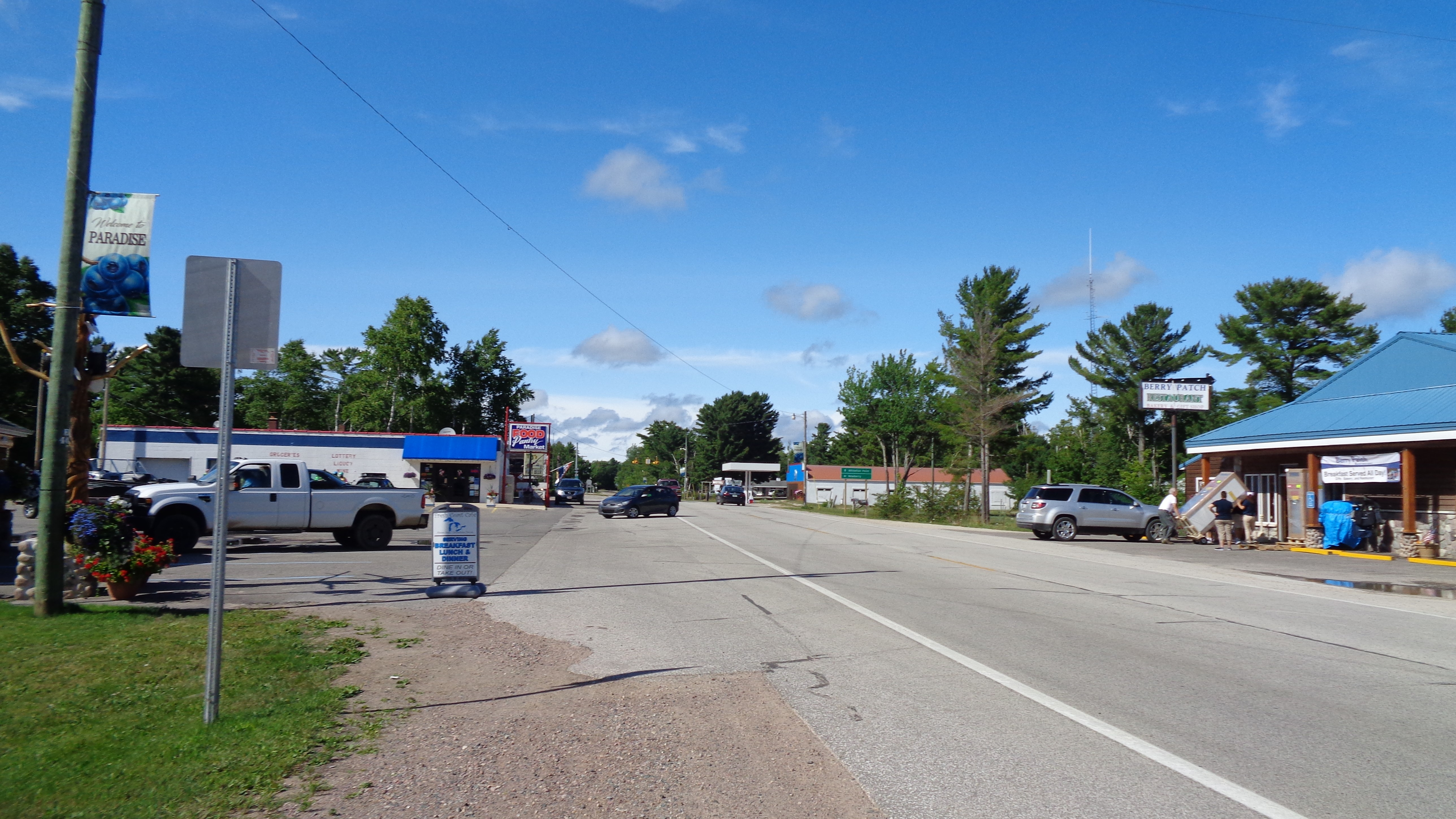
- Looking north along M-123

- Location within the state of Michigan
- Coordinates: 46°37′39″N 85°02′15″W
- Country: United States
- State: Michigan
- County: Chippewa
- Township: Whitefish
- Elevation: 623 ft (190 m)
- Time zone: UTC-5 (Eastern (EST))
  - Summer (DST): UTC-4 (EDT)
- ZIP code(s): 49768
- Area code: 906
- FIPS code: 26-62300
- GNIS feature ID: 1621151

Paradise is an unincorporated community in Whitefish Township, Chippewa County in the U.S. state of Michigan. Paradise is on the northeastern portion of Michigan's Upper Peninsula, on the western side of Whitefish Bay, Lake Superior, about 60 miles (97 km) by road from Sault Ste. Marie and about 55 miles (89 km) north of the Mackinac Bridge. Its zip code is 49768, and the area code is 906. Founded in 1925, Paradise is surrounded by state and national forests and its main business is tourism. It is considered one of two gateways to the Tahquamenon Falls area and Tahquamenon Falls State Park. (The other gateway is Newberry, about 40 miles (64 km) to the southwest.) The area draws hunters, fishers, campers, backpackers, snowmobilers and birdwatchers. The region harvests blueberries and cranberries in season. It is also the home of the blueberry festival held every summer. Lake Superior shipping lanes are several miles off shore. The Paradise post office opened May 1, 1947.

Paradise is the main point of entry to Whitefish Point, 11 miles (18 km) to the north, which is a world migratory route protected by the Seney National Wildlife Refuge, and studied by the Whitefish Point Bird Observatory. It is also known for the Great Lakes Shipwreck Museum, its Lake Superior shoreline, the Whitefish Point Lighthouse, and the Whitefish Point Underwater Preserve, a series of sunken shipwrecks.

The Sufjan Stevens album Greetings from Michigan contains a song entitled "For The Widows In Paradise, For the Fatherless in Ypsilanti."

The Alex McKnight series of fictional crime books by author Steve Hamilton is set in Paradise, and includes numerous descriptions of the terrain and natural landmarks.

== Climate ==
Climate data for Paradise, Michigan, 1991–2020 normals: 628ft (191m)
| Month | Jan | Feb | Mar | Apr | May | Jun | Jul | Aug | Sep | Oct | Nov | Dec | Year |
|---|---|---|---|---|---|---|---|---|---|---|---|---|---|
| Mean daily maximum °F (°C) | 23.5 (−4.7) | 26.0 (−3.3) | 34.7 (1.5) | 46.2 (7.9) | 59.2 (15.1) | 68.5 (20.3) | 74.7 (23.7) | 74.5 (23.6) | 66.8 (19.3) | 53.3 (11.8) | 39.8 (4.3) | 29.4 (−1.4) | 49.7 (9.8) |
| Daily mean °F (°C) | 16.1 (−8.8) | 16.7 (−8.5) | 24.2 (−4.3) | 36.6 (2.6) | 48.8 (9.3) | 57.9 (14.4) | 63.5 (17.5) | 63.7 (17.6) | 56.6 (13.7) | 44.4 (6.9) | 33.0 (0.6) | 23.0 (−5.0) | 40.4 (4.7) |
| Mean daily minimum °F (°C) | 8.6 (−13.0) | 7.3 (−13.7) | 13.6 (−10.2) | 26.9 (−2.8) | 38.3 (3.5) | 47.2 (8.4) | 52.3 (11.3) | 52.8 (11.6) | 46.3 (7.9) | 35.6 (2.0) | 26.2 (−3.2) | 16.5 (−8.6) | 31.0 (−0.6) |
| Average precipitation inches (mm) | 3.16 (80) | 2.01 (51) | 2.09 (53) | 2.87 (73) | 2.81 (71) | 3.00 (76) | 2.75 (70) | 3.35 (85) | 4.07 (103) | 4.37 (111) | 3.25 (83) | 3.43 (87) | 37.16 (943) |
Source: NOAA
