= List of lighthouses in Michigan =

This is a list of all lighthouses in the U.S. state of Michigan as identified by the United States Coast Guard. Michigan is home to lights on four of the Great Lakes, Lake St. Clair and connecting waterways.

The first lighthouse in the state, Fort Gratiot Light, was erected in 1825. It is still active.

If not otherwise noted, focal height and coordinates are taken from the United States Coast Guard Light List, while location and dates of activation, automation, and deactivation are taken from the United States Coast Guard Historical information site for lighthouses. (below, 129, Active, Inactive, Moved, Museum; 24, Destroyed)

Name	Waterway	Location	Coordinates	Image	Focal Height	Built (Note: If there is a second date, it represents the date the most recent tower was lit.)	Automated	Deactivated	Status
Alpena Light	Lake Huron	Alpena	45.06042°N 83.4229°W		44 ft (13 m)	1877/1914	1974		Active
Au Sable Light	Lake Superior	Burt Township, Alger County	46.67306°N 86.13933°W		100 ft (30 m)	1874	1958		Active
Au Sable North Pierhead Light	Lake Huron	Au Sable	44.40662°N 83.3165°W		25 ft (7.6 m)				Active
Beaver Island Harbor Light	Lake Michigan	Beaver Island, northern end	45.74278°N 85.50861°W		38 ft (12 m)	1856/1870	1927		Active (Note: Also known as St. James Light.)
Beaver Island Head Light	Lake Michigan	Beaver Island, southern tip	45.57639°N 85.5725°W		103 ft (31 m)	1851		1962	Inactive (Note: Owned by Charlevoix Public School System.)
Belle Isle Light	Detroit River	Belle Isle							Destroyed
Big Bay Point Light	Lake Superior	Big Bay	46.84028°N 87.68194°W		89 ft (27 m)	1896	1941	1961–1990	Active (Note: Private owner.)
Big Sable Point Light	Lake Michigan	Ludington	44.05772°N 86.51444°W		106 ft (32 m)	1867			Active
Bois Blanc Light	Lake Huron	Bois Blanc Island	45.811°N 84.422°W		32 ft (9.8 m)	1867		1955	Inactive
Caseville Harbor Light	Lake Huron	Caseville	43.94347°N 83.27278°W		65 ft (20 m)				Active
Cedar River Light	Lake Michigan	Cedar River	45.40735°N 87.35103°W		26 ft (7.9 m)	1889			Active
Charity Island Light	Lake Huron	Charity Island	44.03139°N 83.43556°W		45 ft (14 m)	1857		1939	Inactive
Charlevoix South Pier Light Station	Lake Michigan	Charlevoix	45.32278°N 85.26972°W		41 ft (12 m)	1914/1948			Active
Cheboygan Crib Light	Lake Huron	Cheboygan	45.6568°N 84.465°W		35 ft (11 m)	1857/1901	1920	1984	Inactive/Moved (Note: Moved to Gordon Turner Park)
Cheboygan River Front Range Light	Lake Huron	Cheboygan	45.64739°N 84.47276°W		48 ft (15 m)	1880			Active
Clinton River Light	Lake St. Clair	Mount Clemens				1847	1872		Destroyed
Copper Harbor Front Range Light	Lake Superior	Copper Harbor	47.48111°N 87.86667°W		28 ft (8.5 m)	1869			Active
Copper Harbor Light	Lake Superior	Copper Harbor	47.47447°N 87.86025°W		90 ft (27 m)	1849/1933	1919		Active
Crisp Point Light	Lake Superior	McMillan Township, Luce County	46.75288°N 85.25733°W		62 ft (19 m)	1904		1947	Inactive/Museum
DeTour Reef Light	Lake Huron	De Tour Village	45.94892°N 83.90305°W		74 ft (23 m)	1847/1931	1974		Active
Detroit River Light	Lake Erie	Rockwood	42.00075°N 83.14068°W		55 ft (17 m)	1875/1885	1979		Active
Eagle Harbor Light	Lake Superior	Eagle Harbor	47.45972°N 88.15917°W		60 ft (18 m)	1851/1871	1980		Active
Eagle Harbor Range Lights	Lake Superior	Eagle Harbor	47.45562°N 88.15339°W			1877		1911	Inactive (Note: Private owner. Moved across the street.)
Eagle River Light	Lake Superior	Eagle River	47.41369°N 88.29828°W			1854/1857		1908	Inactive
Ecorse Light	Detroit River	Ecorse			32 ft (9.8 m)	1895			Destroyed
Ecorse Range Rear Light	Detroit River	Ecorse			45 ft (14 m)	1894			Destroyed
Fort Gratiot Light	Lake Huron	Port Huron	43.0063°N 82.42247°W		82 ft (25 m)	1825/1829	1933		Active
Forty Mile Point Light	Lake Huron	Rogers Township, Presque Isle County	45.48667°N 83.91333°W		66 ft (20 m)	1897	1969		Active
Fourteen Foot Shoal Light	Lake Huron	Cheboygan County	45.67981°N 84.435°W		51 ft (16 m)	1930	Yes		Active
Fourteen Mile Point Light	Lake Superior	Ontonagon	46.99285°N 89.12573°W			1894		1934	Inactive
Frankfort Light	Lake Michigan	Frankfort	44.6306°N 86.2522°W		72 ft (22 m)	1873/1932	Yes		Active
Frankfort South Range Light	Lake Michigan	Frankfort							Destroyed
Frying Pan Island Light	St. Marys River	De Tour Village	45.98545°N 83.89471°W			1879/1882			Active (Note: Replaced with pole light. Tower moved to Sault Ste. Marie Coast Guard station.)
Gibraltar Light	Detroit River	Gibraltar				1838/1873		1879	Destroyed
Grand Haven North Pierhead Light	Lake Michigan	Grand Haven	43.05817°N 86.25589°W		36 ft (11 m)				Active
Grand Haven South Pierhead Entrance Light	Lake Michigan	Grand Haven	43.05694°N 86.25592°W		42 ft (13 m)	1839/1905	1969		Active
Grand Haven South Pierhead Inner Light	Lake Michigan	Grand Haven	43.05725°N 86.25381°W		52 ft (16 m)	1839/1905	1969		Active
Grand Island East Channel Light	Lake Superior	Munising	46.45017°N 86.62242°W			1870		1913	Inactive
Grand Island Harbor Rear Range Light	Lake Superior	Christmas	46.43667°N 86.69111°W		70 ft (21 m)	1868/1914		1969	Inactive
Grand Island North Light	Lake Superior	Grand Island	46.55889°N 86.69111°W			1854/1867	1927	1961	Inactive
Grand Marais Range Lights	Lake Superior	Grand Marais	46.68389°N 85.97222°W		54 ft (16 m) (inner); 40 ft (12 m) (outer)	1895			Active
Grand Traverse Light	Lake Michigan	Leelanau Peninsula	45.21°N 85.55°W		47 ft (14 m)	1852/1858	1972	1972	Inactive/Museum
Granite Island Light	Lake Superior	Granite Island	46.72083°N 87.41194°W		96 ft (29 m)	1868	1939		Active (Note: Replaced with light on metal tower. Lighthouse is privately owned.)
Grassy Island North Channel Range Lights	Detroit River	Grassy Island				1897			Destroyed
Grassy Island South Channel Range Lights (formerly Grassy Island Light)	Detroit River	Grassy Island				1849/1896			Destroyed
Gravelly Shoal Light	Lake Huron	Saginaw Bay	44.01833°N 83.53722°W		75 ft (23 m)	1939			Active
Grays Reef Light	Lake Michigan	Bliss Township, Emmet County	45.76667°N 85.15333°W		82 ft (25 m)	1891/1936	1976		Active
Grosse Ile North Channel Range Lights	Detroit River	Grosse Ile				1894/1906		1963	Destroyed (rear); Inactive (front)
Grosse Ile South Channel Range Lights	Detroit River	Grosse Ile							Active (Note: Replaced with skeleton towers.)
Gull Rock Light	Lake Superior	Manitou Island, offshore west	47.41722°N 87.66361°W		50 ft (15 m)	1867	1913		Active
Harbor Beach Light	Lake Huron	Harbor Beach, Michigan	43.845°N 82.63167°W		54 ft (16 m)	1858/1885	1968		Active (Note: Owned by the City of Harbor Beach)
Harwood Point East Range Front Light	St. Marys River	Sugar Island							Destroyed
Holland Harbor Light	Lake Michigan	Holland	42.77269°N 86.21242°W		52 ft (16 m)	1872/1936	1932		Active
Huron Island Light	Lake Superior	Powell Township, Marquette County	46.96333°N 87.99833°W		197 ft (60 m)	1868/1877	1972		Active
Ile Aux Galets Light	Lake Michigan	Emmet County	45.67639°N 85.17306°W		58 ft (18 m)	1850/1888	1969		Active
Isle Royale Light	Lake Superior	Isle Royale	47.9479°N 88.7612°W		72 ft (22 m)	1875	1913		Active
Kalamazoo River Light (Saugatuck Light)	Lake Michigan	Saugatuck				1858		1914	Destroyed
Keweenaw Waterway Lower Entrance Light	Lake Superior	Jacobsville	46.96879°N 88.4311°W		68 ft (21 m)	1868/1920	1973		Active
Keweenaw Waterway Upper Entrance Light	Lake Superior	Stanton Township, Houghton County	47.23454°N 88.63029°W		82 ft (25 m)	1874/1950	1973		Active
Lake St. Clair Light	Lake St. Clair	Harsens Island	42.50854°N 82.69846°W		43 ft (13 m)	1941	Yes		Active
Lansing Shoals Light	Lake Michigan	Newton Township, Mackinac County	45.90333°N 85.56167°W		69 ft (21 m)	1900/1928	1976		Active
Little Sable Point Light	Lake Michigan	Golden Township, Oceana County	43.65167°N 86.53889°W		108 ft (33 m)	1874	1955		Active
Little Traverse Light	Lake Michigan	Harbor Springs	45.41919°N 84.97741°W		72 ft (22 m)	1884/1963			Active (Note: Replaced with skeleton tower.)
Ludington Light	Lake Michigan	Ludington	43.95361°N 86.46937°W		55 ft (17 m)	1871/1924	1972		Active
Mama Juda Light	Detroit River	Mamajuda Island							Destroyed
Mama Juda Range Front Light	Detroit River	Mamajuda Island							Destroyed
Manistee Main Light	Lake Michigan	Manistee							Destroyed
Manistee Pierhead lights	Lake Michigan	Manistee	44.2517°N 86.3464°W		55 ft (17 m) (north); 29 ft (8.8 m) (south)	1875/1927	1927		Active
Manistique East Breakwater Light	Lake Michigan	Manistique	45.94478°N 86.24765°W		50 ft (15 m)	1915/1917	1969		Active
Manitou Island Light	Lake Superior	Manitou Island	47.41972°N 87.58722°W		81 ft (25 m)	1850/1861	1978		Active
Manning Memorial Light	Lake Michigan	Empire	44.80793°N 86.25521°W		38 ft (12 m)	1990	Yes		Active
Mariners Memorial (River Rouge) Light	Detroit River	River Rouge	42.27101°N 83.11128°W			2003			Active (Note: Owned by the City of River Rouge. Located in Belanger Park.)
Marquette Breakwater Outer Light	Lake Superior	Marquette	46.5338°N 87.37473°W		36 ft (11 m)	1875/1908			Active
Marquette Harbor Light	Lake Superior	Marquette	46.54669°N 87.37604°W		77 ft (23 m)	1853/1866			Active
Martin Reef Light	Lake Huron	Clark Township, Mackinac County	45.91333°N 84.14833°W		65 ft (20 m)	1927	Yes		Active
McGulpin Point Light	Straits of Mackinac	Wawatam Township, Emmet County	45.7869°N 84.7722°W		102 ft (31 m)	1869			Active
Mendota (Bete Grise) Light	Lake Superior	Delaware	47.37417°N 87.96667°W		44 ft (13 m)	1870/1895	1933	1960–1998	Active
Menominee Pier Light	Lake Michigan	Menominee	45.11392°N 87.58603°W		46 ft (14 m)	1887/1927	1972		Active
Middle Island Light	Lake Huron	Alpena Township, Alpena County	45.19306°N 83.32111°W		78 ft (24 m)	1905	Yes		Active
Middle Lake George Light	St. Marys River	Sugar Island							Destroyed
Miller Memorial Light	Lake St. Clair	St. Clair Shores	42.46375°N 82.87917°W		270 ft (82 m)				Active
Minneapolis Shoal Light	Lake Huron	Big Bay de Noc	45.53611°N 86.99833°W		82 ft (25 m)	1935	1979		Active
Mission Point Light	Lake Michigan	Old Mission Point	44.99131°N 85.47947°W		47 ft (14 m)	1870		1933	Inactive
Mission Point Light (1933)	Lake Michigan	Old Mission Point	45.01823°N 85.50603°W		41 ft (12 m)	1933			Inactive
Monroe Pier Light	Lake Erie	Monroe				1849/1884		1916	Destroyed
Munising Front Range Light	Lake Superior	Munising	46.41512°N 86.66115°W		79 ft (24 m)	1908	Yes		Active
Munising Rear Range Light	Lake Superior	Munising	46.41254°N 86.66396°W		107 ft (33 m)	1908	Yes		Active
Muskegon Breakwater Light	Lake Michigan	Muskegon	45.19075°N 83.34689°W		70 ft (21 m)	1851/1871			Active
Muskegon Pier Light	Lake Michigan	Muskegon	43.22665°N 86.34126°W		50 ft (15 m)	1903			Active
Naubinway Island Light	Lake Michigan	Naubinway	46.0756°N 85.44497°W		32 ft (9.8 m)				Active
New Buffalo Light	Lake Michigan	New Buffalo							Destroyed
North Manitou Island Light	Lake Michigan	North Manitou Island	45.063°N 85.964°W			1899		1935	Destroyed
North Manitou Shoal Light Station	Lake Michigan	North Manitou Island	45.021°N 85.95713°W		79 ft (24 m)	1935	1980		Active
Old Mackinac Point Light	Straits of Mackinac	Mackinaw City	45.7875°N 84.72944°W		62 ft (19 m)	1889/1892		1957	Inactive
Ontonagon Harbor West Breakwater Light	Lake Superior	Ontonagon	46.87947°N 89.33084°W		31 ft (9.4 m)				Active
Ontonagon Light	Lake Superior	Ontonagon	46.87361°N 89.31861°W			1852/1866		1964	Inactive
Passage Island Light	Lake Superior	Isle Royale	48.2237°N 88.36558°W		78 ft (24 m)	1882	1978		Active
Peche Island Rear Range Light	Lake St. Clair	Peche Island, offshore west	42.3536°N 82.9172°W		114 ft (35 m)	1908/1983			Active (Note: Replaced with skeleton tower. Original tower moved to Marine City Waterfront Park.)
Peninsula Point Light	Lake Michigan	Bay de Noc Township, Delta County	45.6682°N 86.9666°W		40 ft (12 m)	1856/1866	1922	1936	Inactive
Pentwater North Pierhead Light	Lake Michigan	Pentwater	43.78083°N 86.44028°W		43 ft (13 m)				Active
Pipe Island Light	St. Marys River	Drummond Township, Chippewa County	46.01633°N 83.8993°W		52 ft (16 m)	1888	1937		Active
Poe Reef Light	Lake Huron	Bois Blanc Island, offshore	45.695°N 84.36167°W		71 ft (22 m)	1893/1929	1974		Active
Point Betsie Light	Lake Michigan	Lake Township, Benzie County	44.6913°N 86.2552°W		52 ft (16 m)	1854	1984		Active
Point Iroquois Light	Lake Superior	Bay Mills Township, Chippewa County	46.48368°N 84.62568°W		72 ft (22 m)	1855/1871	1962	1971	Inactive
Pointe aux Barques Light	Lake Huron	Port Hope	44.02333°N 82.79333°W		93 ft (28 m)	1848/1857	1958		Active
Port Austin Light	Lake Huron	Port Austin, offshore	44.08333°N 82.98333°W		76 ft (23 m)	1878/1899	Yes		Active
Port Sanilac Light	Lake Huron	Port Sanilac	43.42901°N 82.5402°W		69 ft (21 m)	1886	1925		Active
Portage Lake Light	Lake Michigan	Portage Lake				1891			Destroyed
Portage River (Jacobsville) Light	Lake Superior	Torch Lake Township, Houghton County	46.97803°N 88.41399°W			1856/1870		1920	Inactive
Poverty Island Light	Lake Michigan	Poverty Island	45.52722°N 86.66361°W		78 ft (24 m)	1874	1957	1976	Inactive
Presque Isle Harbor Breakwater Light	Lake Superior	Marquette	46.574144°N 87.374577°W						
Presque Isle Light (new)	Lake Huron	Presque Isle Township, Presque Isle County	45.28722°N 83.47389°W		123 ft (37 m)	1871	1970		Active
Presque Isle Light (old)	Lake Huron	Presque Isle Township, Presque Isle County	45.34203°N 83.47828°W		36 ft (11 m)	1840		1871	Inactive/Museum
Rock Harbor Light	Lake Superior	Rock Harbor	48.08917°N 88.57917°W			1855		1879	Inactive
Rock of Ages Light	Lake Superior	Washington Island, offshore	47.86667°N 89.31333°W		130 ft (40 m)	1908	1978		Active
Rouleau Point Range Front and Rear Lights	Keweenaw Waterway	Washington Island, offshore	47.19549°N 88.61601°W (rear); 47.19256°N 88.61885°W (front)		55 ft (17 m) (rear); 26 ft (7.9 m) (front)	1897/1937	Yes		Active
Round Island Light	Straits of Mackinac	Round Island	45.83717°N 84.61658°W		53 ft (16 m)	1895	1924	1947–1996	Active
Round Island Light (St. Mary's River)	St. Marys River	Round Island	46.10897°N 84.01993°W			1892			Inactive
Round Island Passage Light	Straits of Mackinac	Round Island Channel	45.84333°N 84.615°W		71 ft (22 m)	1947	1973		Active
Saginaw Bay Light	Lake Huron	Bay City				1831		1876	Destroyed
Saginaw River Rear Range Light	Lake Huron	Bay City	43.6355°N 83.85056°W		77 ft (23 m)	1876	1954	1962	Inactive
Sand Beach North Entrance East Light	Lake Huron								Destroyed
Sand Hills Light	Lake Superior	Ahmeek	47.39194°N 88.37042°W		93 ft (28 m)	1919	1939	1954	Inactive
Sand Point Light	Lake Michigan	Escanaba	45.74444°N 87.04444°W		44 ft (13 m)	1867		1934	Inactive/Museum
Sand Point Light (Baraga)	Lake Superior	Baraga	46.78337°N 88.46685°W			1878		1922	Inactive
Seul Choix Light	Lake Michigan	Mueller Township, Schoolcraft County	45.92139°N 85.91194°W		80 ft (24 m)	1892	1972		Active
Six Mile Point Range Rear Light	St. Marys River								Inactive/Moved (Note: Moved to Les Cheneaux Maritime Museum.)
South Fox Island Light	Lake Michigan	South Fox Island	45.3785°N 85.8371°W		39 ft (12 m)	1867/1934		1969	Inactive
South Haven Light	Lake Michigan	South Haven	42.40222°N 86.28444°W		37 ft (11 m)	1872/1903	Yes		Active
South Manitou Island Light	Lake Michigan	South Manitou Island	45.00768°N 86.09378°W		54 ft (16 m)	1839/1872	1935	1967–2009	Active
Spectacle Reef Light	Lake Huron	Cheboygan County	45.77333°N 84.13667°W		86 ft (26 m)	1874	1972		Active
Squaw Point Light	Lake Michigan								Destroyed
Squaw Island Light	Lake Michigan	Squaw Island	45.8399°N 85.58713°W			1892			Inactive
St. Clair Flats Front and Rear Range Light	Lake St. Clair	Harsens Island, offshore	42.5375°N 82.69472°W			1859			Active (Note: Only front light active.)
St. Helena Island Light	Straits of Mackinac	St. Helena Island	45.855°N 84.86333°W		71 ft (22 m)	1873	1922		Active
St. Joseph North Pier Inner Light	Lake Michigan	St. Joseph	42.1161°N 86.49348°W		53 ft (16 m)	1832/1906			Active
St. Joseph North Pier Outer Light	Lake Michigan	St. Joseph	42.11633°N 86.49456°W		31 ft (9.4 m)	1832/1906			Active
St. Martin Island Light	Lake Michigan	St. Martin Island	45.50278°N 86.7575°W		81 ft (25 m)	1905			Inactive
St. Mary's River Lower Range Front Light	St. Marys River								Destroyed
Stannard Rock Light	Lake Superior	Keweenaw Peninsula, offshore	47.18351°N 87.22512°W		102 ft (31 m)	1882	1962		Active
Sturgeon Point Light	Lake Huron	Haynes Township, Michigan, Alcona County	44.71269°N 83.27272°W		69 ft (21 m)	1869	1939		Active
Tawas Point Light	Lake Huron	Baldwin Township, Iosco County	44.254°N 83.449°W		70 ft (21 m)	1853/1876		2016	Inactive/Museum
Thunder Bay Island Light	Lake Huron	Alpena County	45.04167°N 83.2°W		63 ft (19 m)	1832	1983		Active
Tri-Centennial Light of Detroit	Detroit River	Detroit	42.33229°N 83.02509°W						Active
Vidal Shoals Channel Range Front and Rear Lights	St. Marys River	Sault Ste. Marie	46.5045°N 84.36374°W (rear); 46.50392°N 84.36715°W (front)		66 ft (20 m) (rear); 32 ft (9.8 m) (front)				Active
Wawatam Lighthouse	Lake Michigan	Emmet County	45°51′57″N 84°42′55″W		52 ft (16 m)	2006			Active
Waugoshance Light	Lake Michigan	Emmet County	45.78611°N 85.09111°W		74 ft (23 m)	1851		1912	Inactive
White River Light	Lake Michigan	Whitehall	43.37473°N 86.42433°W			1875	1945	1960	Inactive/Museum
White Shoal Light	Lake Michigan	Emmet County	45.84222°N 85.13528°W		125 ft (38 m)	1891/1910	1976		Active
Whitefish Point Light	Lake Superior	Whitefish Township, Chippewa County	46.77056°N 84.95667°W		80 ft (24 m)	1848/1861	1970		Active
William Livingstone Memorial Light	Detroit River	Belle Isle	42.34702°N 82.95431°W		58 ft (18 m)	1930			Active
Windmill Point Light	Detroit River	Detroit	42.35756°N 82.92996°W		42 ft (13 m)	1933			Active
Windmill Point Range Front and Rear Lights	Detroit River	Detroit							Destroyed
Winter Point Range Front Light	St. Marys River		46.22608°N 84.14409°W		46 ft (14 m)				Active

== See also ==
- Ladies of the Lights
