= SS Comet (1857) =

1857 steamship, only treasure ship of Lake Superior

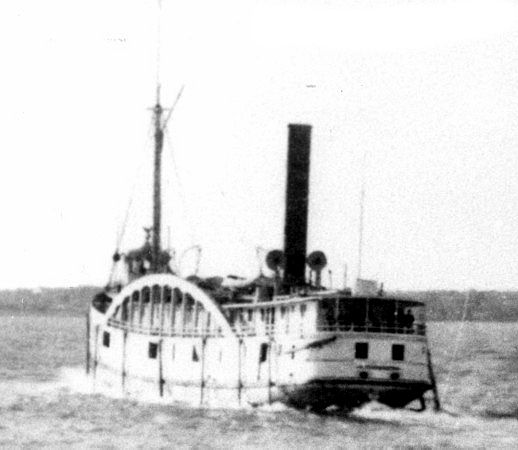
- Comet underway

History

United States
- Name: Comet
- Owner: Dean Richmond (New York Central Railroad Company)1875; W. M. Hanna and George W. Chapin, Cleveland, Ohio 1875
- Port of registry: Cleveland, Ohio United States
- Builder: Peck & Masters, Cleveland, Ohio
- Completed: 1857
- Fate: Sank in Whitefish Bay 26 August 1875 after colliding with the Manitoba
- Notes: United States Registry # 5683

General characteristics
- Class & type: Propeller
- Tonnage: 744 Gross Register Tonnage
- Length: 181 ft (55 m)
- Beam: 29 ft (8.8 m)
- Depth: 12.33 ft (3.76 m)
- Propulsion: Propeller, direct acting vertical engine
- Crew: 19

SS Comet was a steamship that operated on the Great Lakes. Comet was built in 1857 as a wooden-hulled propeller-driven cargo vessel that was soon adapted to carry passengers. It suffered a series of maritime accidents prior to its final sinking in 1875 causing the loss of ten lives. It became known as the only treasure ship of Lake Superior because she carried 70 tons of Montana silver ore when it sank. The first attempts to salvage its cargo in 1876 and 1938 were unsuccessful. Comet was finally salvaged in the 1980s when the Great Lakes Shipwreck Historical Society illegally removed artifacts from the wreck. The artifacts are now the property of the State of Michigan and are on display as a loan to the Great Lakes Shipwreck Museum. The fate of her silver ore cargo is unknown. Comet's wreck is now protected by the Whitefish Point Underwater Preserve as part of an underwater museum.

== History ==
The 181-foot (55 m), 744-ton wooden propeller ship Comet, along with her sister ship, the Rocket, was launched in 1857 by Peak and Masters of Cleveland, Ohio. Her direct-acting vertical engine was manufactured by Cuyahoga Steam Furnace of Cleveland. Comet was originally built as a pure workhorse. Upper deck cabins for passenger accommodations were not added until the winter layup of 1859–60.

Comet went through a variety of owners. She was first acquired by Dean Richmond (New York Central Railroad). Her last owners were W.M. Hanna and George W. Chapin of Cleveland. Comet was involved in a series of maritime accidents prior to her final sinking in 1875. In 1863, she sank another boat in a collision on Lake Erie. She was run aground on a reef off Port Washington, Wisconsin in Lake Michigan in 1865. In August 1869, she rammed and sank the sidewheeler Silver Spray. Comet sank for the first time in 1869 after a collision with Hunter below Detroit, Michigan. Both vessels sank, were raised, and returned to service.

== Final voyage ==
Comet cleared Duluth, Minnesota on 23 August 1875 bound for Buffalo, New York with intermediate stops on Lake Superior. After she had rounded Whitefish Point Light on a clear, starlit night about 8:05 PM of 26 August 1875 and was heading on the usual southeast course to Point Iroquois Light, her lookout spotted a white light in the dusk right on their course. Fifteen minutes later, after the lookout spotted a red light, Captain Dugat altered course a point to port, heading southeast half south. Just moments later the green lights of an approaching vessel appeared. When Captain Dugat realized he had swung across the bow of a steamer, he blew one blast on the whistle and ordered a hard turn, but it was too late. Shipwreck historian Janice Gerred reported that the "Canadian steamer Manitoba struck the Comet stem on about 20 feet (6.1 m), forward the stern on the port side right down to the water's edge." The Toronto Globe reported an eye witness account that Comet's hull parted and sank almost immediately; the upper works crumbled and sank within one minute. Two men were crushed when the steamers collided. One man was hanging from a window sash on Manitoba, lost his grip, and was heard exclaiming, "Oh Lord, I am gone" as the suction of the wreck pulled him down. Ten men, including those below deck, did not survive. Six men jumped from the wreck to the decks of Manitoba whose boats picked up four more survivors. Captain Dugat, the master, two shipmates, two wheelsmen, one fireman, one lookout, and one porter survived. Manitoba made every effort to save everyone possible. She took the rescued to Sault Ste. Marie, Michigan, where they were given passage to Cleveland.

The United States maritime investigation absolved Comet's Captain Dugat of any blame for the collision in 1876. The Canadians absolved Manitoba's Captain Symes of any blame.

== Treasure ship ==
Comet was first dubbed a "true treasure ship" by shipwreck historian Frederick Stonehouse in 1973. When she sank, her vessel was valued at $45,000 and the cargo at $50,000. The Sault Evening News of Sault Ste. Marie, Michigan announced in 1980 that Comet was the "only known treasure ship on the bottom of the lake" when interviewing Great Lakes Shipwreck Historical Society [GLSHS] spokesperson Tom Farnquist. Comet carried 500 tons of pig iron, some copper ore, 54 sacks of wool, and 70 tons of Montana silver ore picked up at Duluth and consigned to Philadelphia, Pennsylvania. Efforts to salvage Comet's cargo failed in 1876 and again in 1938 when the wreck could not be found. The GLSHS in the 1980s extensively filmed and salvaged the Comet wreck.

== Wreck discovery and artifacts ==
Comet was first located in the 1970s by Great Lakes diver Kent Bellrichard of Milwaukee, Wisconsin. Bob Nicholls and Tom Farnquist of the GLSHS again located Comet on 6 June 1980. In July 1980 Farnquist announced "divers will attempt to salvage as much of the silver as well as other salvageable material or artifacts. All of the process will be filmed. Proceeds will be used by the Shipwreck Society for further exploration and for the Society's museum work."

Michigan's Antiquities Act of 1980 prohibited the removal of artifacts from shipwrecks on the Great Lakes bottomlands. The Michigan Department of Natural Resources and Environment (DNRE) 1992 raid on the GLSHS offices and Great Lakes Shipwreck Museum included seizure of artifacts that GLSHS had illegally removed from Comet, but her cargo of Montana silver ore was not accounted for in the Affidavit of Search Warrant & Investigation Report.

== Wreck today ==
Artifacts from the Comet wreck are on display in the Great Lakes Shipwreck Museum as a loan from the State of Michigan by a 1993 settlement agreement with the GLSHS following the DNRE raid on the museum in 1992.

Comet lies in 230 feet (70 m) of water at 46°43.02′N 84°52.00′W in Whitefish Bay of Lake Superior. Scuba diving to the wrecksite requires advanced technical diving skills. Great Lakes diver Steve Harrington reported that "divers will find much of the hull intact with twin standing arches." The wreck is protected for future generations by the Whitefish Point Underwater Preserve as part of an underwater museum.

== Other vessels ==
Several other ships have borne the name "Comet" including the PS Comet (1814), and another that broke apart in 1812 after a few runs.

== See also ==
- Graveyard of the Great Lakes
