= Martin Reef Light Station =

Lighthouse in Michigan, United States

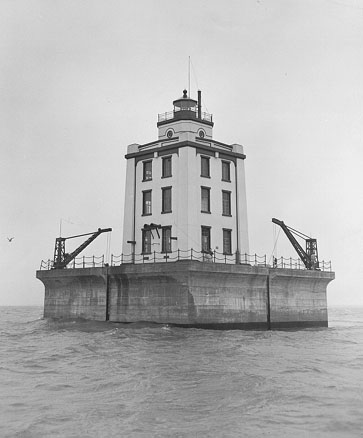
- Location: N Lake Huron, 4.3 miles (6.9 km) S of Cadogan Point
- Coordinates: 45°54′48″N 84°8′54″W

Tower
- Foundation: crib
- Construction: reinforced concrete & steel
- Height: 52 feet (16 m)
- Shape: square
- Markings: white with red roof
- Heritage: National Register of Historic Places listed place

Light
- First lit: 1927
- Focal height: 65 feet (20 m)
- Lens: fourth order Fresnel lens (original), 7.9-inch (200 mm) acrylic lens (current)
- Range: 13 nautical miles (24 km; 15 mi)
- Characteristic: FI R 10s
- Martin Reef Light Station
- U.S. National Register of Historic Places
- Nearest city: Clark Township, Michigan
- Area: less than one acre
- Architect: US Lighthouse Service
- MPS: Light Stations of the United States MPS
- NRHP reference No.: 05000743
- Added to NRHP: July 27, 2005

The Martin Reef Light Station is a lighthouse located in northern Lake Huron, 4.3 miles (6.9 km) south of Cadogan Point in Clark Township, Michigan. It was listed on the National Register of Historic Places in 2005.

== History ==
At the end of the 19th century, the availability of iron ore from the Upper Peninsula caused shipping traffic through the Great Lakes to increase tremendously. Martin Reef, only a few inches deep in its shallowest area, was a significant hazard for ships approaching the Straits of Mackinac. In 1896, the Lighthouse Board asked for funds to be allocated to construct a lightship to station at the reef. However, despite repeated requests, it was not until 1906 that Congress approved the request. Plans were drawn up to construct a lightship designated LV89. In 1907, the Racine-Truscott-Shell Boat building Company of Muskegon, Michigan was awarded a contract to build the steel-hulled vessel. The vessel was completed in 1908, but was not stationed on the reef until the beginning of the 1909 shipping season.

However, over the next few decades, ships in the Great Lakes became larger and larger, and extended the shipping season past the times that LC89 was able to stay on station due to winter ice. In the 1920s, the Lighthouse Service began designing a permanent structure to replace the lightship on Martin Reef, and soon funds were allocated for construction. Work was started in the summer of 1927, and once the pier structure was complete, a temporary light was rigged and LV89 was removed and stationed at North Manitou Shoal in Lake Michigan. The entire project was completed in the summer of 1927.

In 1939, the Coast Guard assumed responsibility for the nation's lighthouses. They installed electric generators at Martin Reef to power the light. At some point, the station was automated, and the original Fresnel lens was removed and replaced with a 7.9-inch (200 mm) acrylic optic. The original lens is on display at the museum at the Point Iroquois Light. In 2000, the ownership of the light station was turned over to the Bureau of Indian Affairs. In January 2020, the ownership of the light station was turned over to the Martin Reef Light Historical Preservation Society Inc.

== Description ==
The Martin Reef Lighthouse sits on a 65 feet (20 m) square concrete-filled crib, placed in 10 feet (3.0 m) at the southeast edge of the reef. The crib is the base for a pier containing cellar storage areas for coal and water. Additional concrete forms an external "wave flare" around the pier, and the resulting pier structure is approximately 25 feet (7.6 m) high from its base. The lighthouse itself is a 25 feet (7.6 m) square, white, three-story structure made of a skeletal steel frame covered with reinforced concrete and iron and sheathed with steel. The lighthouse is centered on the crib. The first floor of the lighthouse was designed as an engine room, the second floor as an office, kitchen, and living area, while the third floor contained sleeping rooms.

A 16 feet (4.9 m) square, 10 feet (3.0 m) watchroom sits on the top of the lighthouse, topped with an octagonal cast iron lantern with a red roof. The lantern originally contained a flashing white fourth order Fresnel lens manufactured by Sautter & Cie of Paris. It currently contains a 200 mm acrylic lens. The lighthouse also contained a compressed air diaphone fog signal. The Poe Reef Light, built in 1929, is a duplicate of this lighthouse.
