= Ladies of the Lights =

Book by Patricia Majher

- Author: Patricia Majher
- Published: 2010
- Publisher: University of Michigan Press
- Pages: 136
- ISBN: 978-0-472-02801-6
- OCLC: 709596554

Ladies of the Lights: Michigan Women in the U.S. Lighthouse Service is a non-fiction book by Patricia Majher that provides historical details of the women who served as Michigan's lighthouse keepers for 105 years.

== Overview ==
As the new assistant director/curator at the Michigan Women's Historical Center and Hall of Fame in 2007, Patricia Majher built a traveling exhibit based on the 2003 article “Mystery at Sand Point Lighthouse” written by historian Kathy Mason. The enthusiasm generated in Michigan by the exhibit prompted Majher to compile her research findings into a book, released by the University of Michigan Press in 2010. There is a background chapter on the first recorded women lighthouse keepers, Irish nuns of the St. Anne's convent in County Cork who maintained the Youghal lighthouse during the years 1190–1542, and the first American woman lighthouse keeper in 1775 at Boston Harbor when Hannah Thomas assumed her husband's lighthouse keeper duties as he went to war. The book covers the lives and light keeper duties of individual Michigan women who served in their positions for the years 1849–1954. Included in the book are salary, duties, and hardships that came with the post, both to the women who officially held the positions, as well as women who unofficially served in that capacity when their lightkeeper husbands were unable to. The author provides insight into family life for lighthouse keepers.

== Contents ==
- Acknowledgments
- Introduction
- Typical Duties of a Lighthouse Keeper
- How Did Women Get Appointed to Keeper Positions?
- What Drew Women to This Work?
- What Special Hardships Did Women Face?
- Were Any Female Keepers Also Mothers?
- Were Female Keepers Treated Differently from Male Keepers?
- What Were the Contributions of Wives of Male Keepers?
- How Long Did Female Keepers Serve?
- Sixteen Who Served
- An Interview with Frances (Wuori Johnson) Marshall
- Epilogue
- Map
- Geographical List of Keepers
- Alphabetical List of Keepers by Last Name
- Alphabetical List of Keepers by Lighthouse
- Chronological List of Keepers
- Suggested Reading
- Notes
- Bibliography
- Index

== Reception ==
Cathy Green for the Michigan Historical Review said the book, "chips away at the romanticized vision of life as a light keeper, while preserving not only the job’s prosaic character but also the exceptional nature of this career." Green credited the book for its wide audience appeal beyond lighthouse aficionados, and noted the author's meticulous historical research in presenting the subject.

Yak's Corner, a children's online news magazine of Detroit Free Press and Detroit news, featured the book for its 2011 Women's History Month coverage. Mlive, the online arm of Booth Newspapers, also featured the book as part of its coverage of Michigan's 2011 Coast Guard Festival. After the book's publication, Majher was a featured speaker for the Bay County Historical Society 's series on lighthouses.

== Detailed release information ==
- Majher, Patricia (2011). Ladies of the Lights: Michigan Women in the U.S. Lighthouse Service. University of Michigan Press. ISBN 978-0-472-02801-6 – via Project MUSE.

== See also ==
- List of lighthouses in Michigan
