= Grassy Island =

Island in Michigan, United States

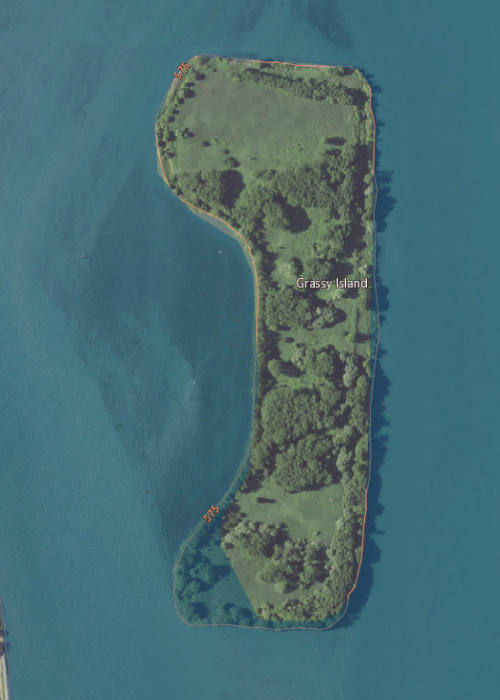
- USGS aerial imagery of Grassy Island

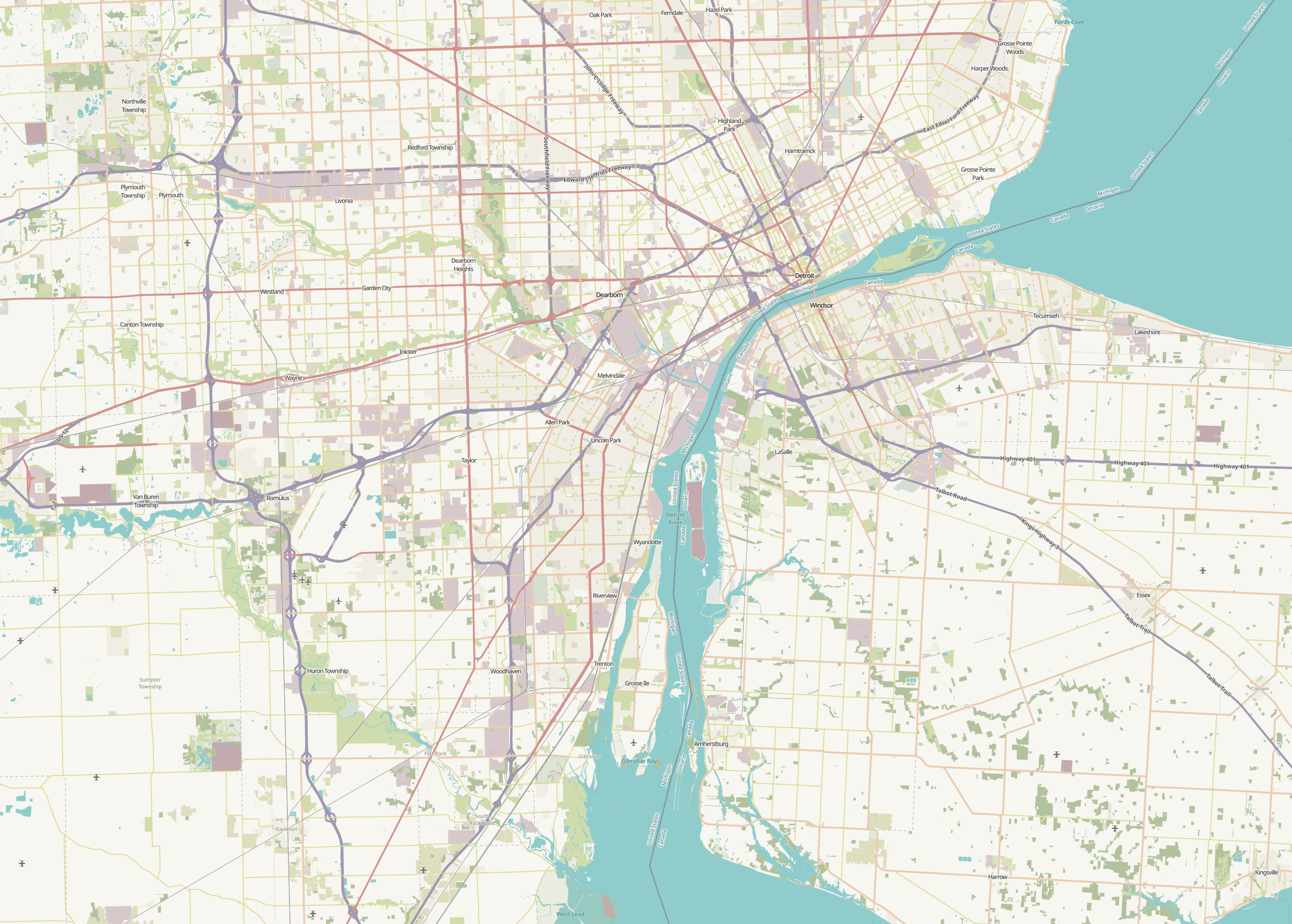
- Location within Wayne County, Michigan Location within Michigan

Geography
- Location: Detroit River
- Coordinates: 42°13′21″N 83°08′05″W
- Area: 72 acres (29 ha)

Administration
- United States
- State: Michigan
- County: Wayne County
- City: Wyandotte

Demographics
- Population: Uninhabited

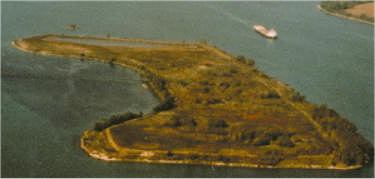
Aerial view of Grassy Island looking north

Grassy Island is a small, uninhabited 72-acre (29 ha) American island in the Detroit River. It is located just north of Grosse Ile and west of Fighting Island, about 600 feet (180 m) west of the Canada–United States border. The island is part of the city of Wyandotte, in Wayne County. The island is part of the Detroit River International Wildlife Refuge. Grassy Island should not be confused with Grass Island, which is an island of Ontario on the exact opposite side of the Detroit River.

Grassy Island was first charted by French explorers in 1796 as Ile Marecageuse (Marshy Island). At the time, the island's size was only six acres (2.4 ha), and the whole length of the Detroit River was a prominent coastal marshland. During the nineteenth century, the island was primarily used as a fishery and later was home to the Grassy Island Light. From around 1960–1982, the island served as a disposal facility for millions of cubic meters of toxic soil dredged from the nearby River Rouge, and the island's size was increased dramatically. Because of that, the island remains heavily contaminated today.

== Expansion ==
When Detroit underwent rapid industrialization beginning at the turn at the twentieth century, much of the pollutants from the growing industries found their way into the Detroit River and had devastating consequences on the ecosystem. When the Detroit River became so polluted as to warrant federal intervention, Congress declared Grassy Island and the surrounding area as part of the Wyandotte National Wildlife Refuge in 1961. However, larger shipping lanes were needed in the Detroit River and its main tributary, the River Rouge, with the increase of commercial shipping and larger freighters during this time. The U.S. Army Corps of Engineers took control of Grassy Island from 1960–1982 and used it as a disposal facility for millions of cubic meters of sediments dredged from the nearby River Rouge for better navigation of that river. Dikes were constructed around Grassy Island to hold the sediments— much of which were heavily contaminated from nearby industries.

When the dredging project was completed, Grassy Island swelled from its original 6 acres (2.4 ha) to 72 acres (29 ha). Because of the island's massive expansion, it can be considered an artificial island, as no real remnants of the original island are seen today. The mouth of the River Rouge was effectively diverted to an easier route (creating the artificial Zug Island in the process) with all the sediments from this new River Rouge route being dumped at Grassy Island with no regard to the amount of pollutants in the soil. The island now has an unnatural appearance and composition. Its sides are steep earthen dikes used to hold up the island, and this can pose a variety of hazards to those who attempt to dock boats at the shore or walk on the island.

== Pollution ==
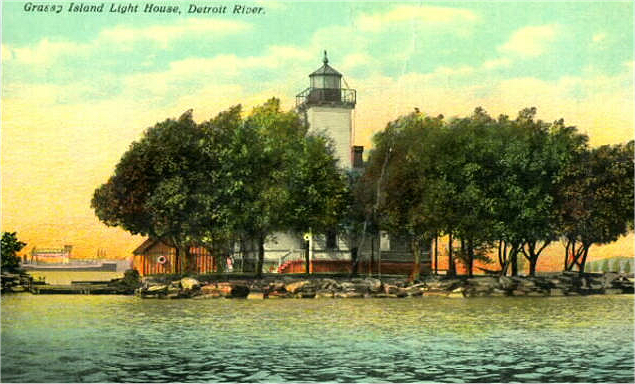
A circa 1915 postcard showing the lighthouse that once stood on Grassy Island

Around the time that Grassy Island became a disposal facility for the dredging of the nearby River Rouge in 1960, at least nine major industries (including the Ford River Rouge Complex) freely dumped their waste products into that river. This caused a huge buildup of toxic waste around the mouth of the river— the exact location where the sediments came from that were deposited on Grassy Island. The soil that was deposited on Grassy Island was highly contaminated from Detroit's unregulated industrialism for many decades. Grassy Island is now contaminated with polychlorinated biphenyl, polycyclic aromatic hydrocarbon, and lethal amounts of harmful heavy metals, such as mercury and lead.

While there is no imminent danger to human trespassers because of a thin layer of protective topsoil on Grassy Island, public access is prohibited but not often enforced. The island has become largely void of wildlife and vegetation, as 97% of the original wetlands around the Detroit River were depleted by 1982. The soil contains 28 different contaminants that exceed state and federal limits. While the site has not been declared a Superfund site, similar procedures are being used by the Environmental Protection Agency and other organizations to clean up Grassy Island. In 1994, the Department of the Interior began working on Grassy Island in order to find remedies for such hazardous sites. Currently, the island is still being evaluated to see if the many contaminants within the soil are leaking into the surrounding Detroit River.

In 2001, the Wyandotte National Wildlife Refuge, including Grassy Island, was absorbed into the newly created Detroit River International Wildlife Refuge, which allowed for more federal funds necessary to clean up the river. Large portions of land have been set aside for ecological restoration. Because of this, much of the Detroit River has been cleaned up, and a number of native animal and plant species have returned.

== See also ==
- Detroit River
- Detroit River International Wildlife Refuge
- List of islands in the Detroit River
- River Rouge
