= Muskegon Breakwater Light =

Lighthouse in Michigan, United States

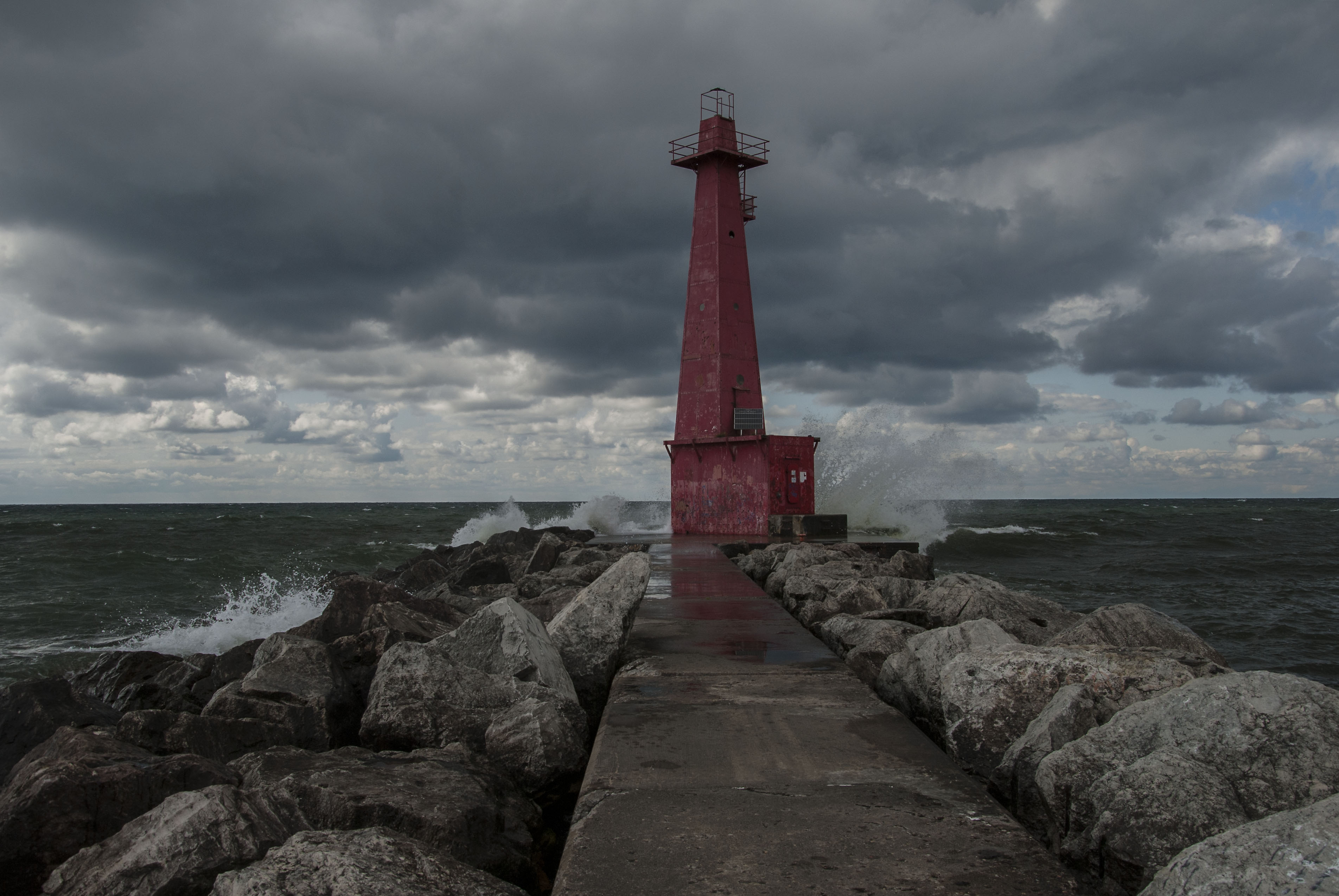
- Muskegon Breakwater Lighthouse
- Location: Muskegon, Michigan
- Coordinates: 43°13′26.5375″N 86°20′48.5452″W

Tower
- Constructed: 1930
- Foundation: square steel equipment room
- Construction: steel
- Height: 53 feet (16 m)
- Shape: square pyramidal
- Markings: red
- Heritage: National Register of Historic Places listed place
- Fog signal: Horn: 2 blasts ev 20s

Light
- First lit: 1930
- Focal height: 70 feet (21 m)
- Range: 8 nautical miles (15 km; 9.2 mi)
- Characteristic: red light, 3s on, 3s off
- Muskegon South Breakwater Light
- U.S. National Register of Historic Places
- Architect: Office of Engineer, 12th Dist.; U.S. Lighthouse Establishment
- MPS: Light Stations of the United States MPS
- NRHP reference No.: 06001026
- Added to NRHP: November 15, 2006

The Muskegon Breakwater Light or South Breakwater Light is a light located on the end of the south arm of the Muskegon breakwater surrounding the mouth of the Muskegon channel in Muskegon, Michigan.

The site is accessible by walking the breakwater. As of Summer, 2015, the light is available to the public for tours.

== History ==
The first lighthouse located in Muskegon was constructed in 1851 atop a wooden tower on land. In 1871, a steel tower was constructed at the end of the breakwater and the main light was rebuilt. In 1928, a new caisson was placed at the end of the south breakwater to support a new light. In 1929 the superstructure for this light was constructed, and it was lit the next year. New navigational equipment was added in 1939.

In 2008 the light became available for transfer under NHLPA, and in June 2010 ownership was transferred to the Michigan Lighthouse Conservancy. The lights and buoys of Muskegon Harbor are maintained by the US Coast Guard Station housed in the lighthouse 3/8 of a mile away, at the mouth of the Muskegon Channel. The light has been in service since 1879.

== Description ==
The Muskegon Breakwater Light is a square pyramidal steel tower mounted on a square steel equipment room. The entire structure is painted red.

== See also ==
- Muskegon Pier Light
- SS Henry Cort, ran aground off the breakwater in 1934
