= Grassy Island Light =

Lighthouse in Michigan, United States

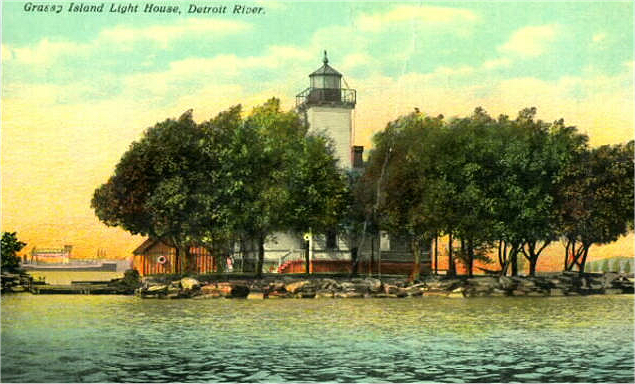
- Location: Wayne County, United States
- Coordinates: 42°13′27.48″N 83°07′59.28″W

Light
- Range: 5 nautical miles (9.3 km; 5.8 mi)

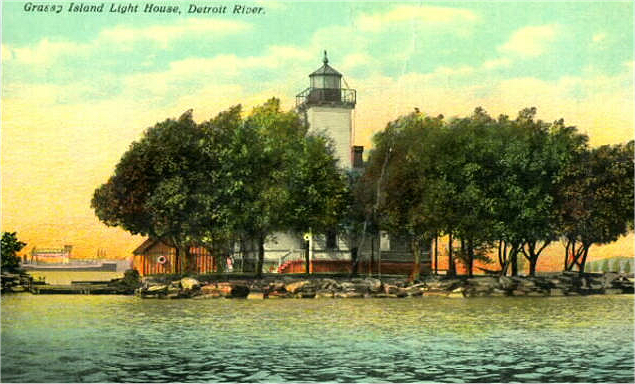
A circa 1915 postcard showing the lighthouse that once stood on Grassy Island

Grassy Island Light is a lighthouse located on Grassy Island, Michigan.
