= St. Joseph North Pier Inner and Outer Lights =

Lighthouse in St. Joseph, Michigan, United States

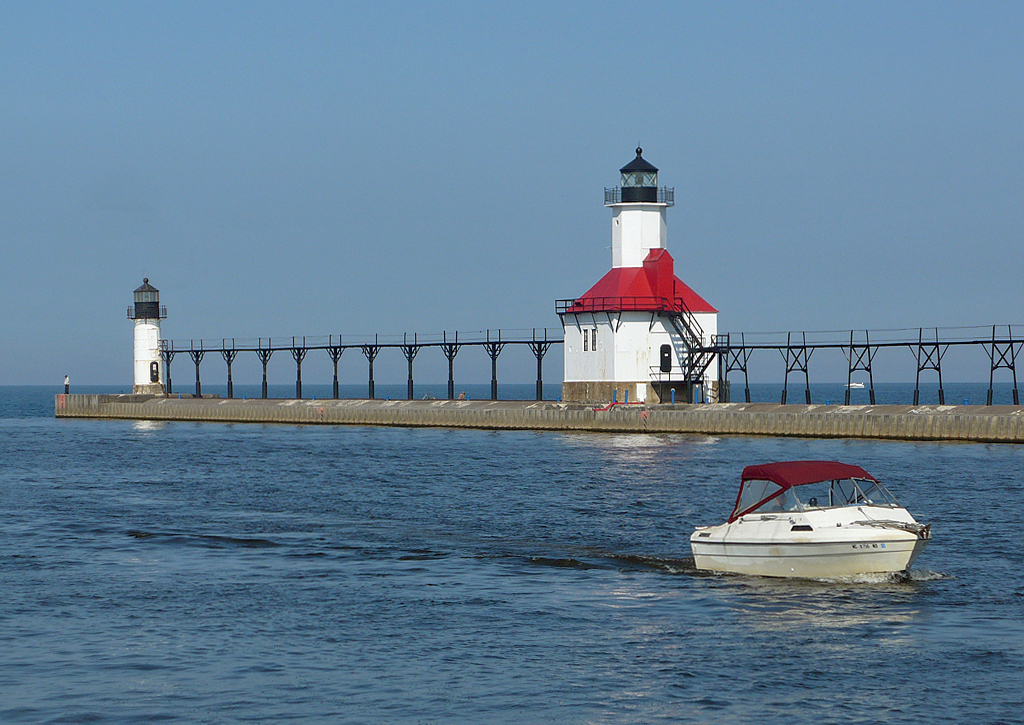
- Location: St. Joseph, United States
- Coordinates: 42°07′N 86°29′W
- Heritage: National Register of Historic Places listed place

Light
- First lit: 1906
- St. Joseph North Pier Inner Light
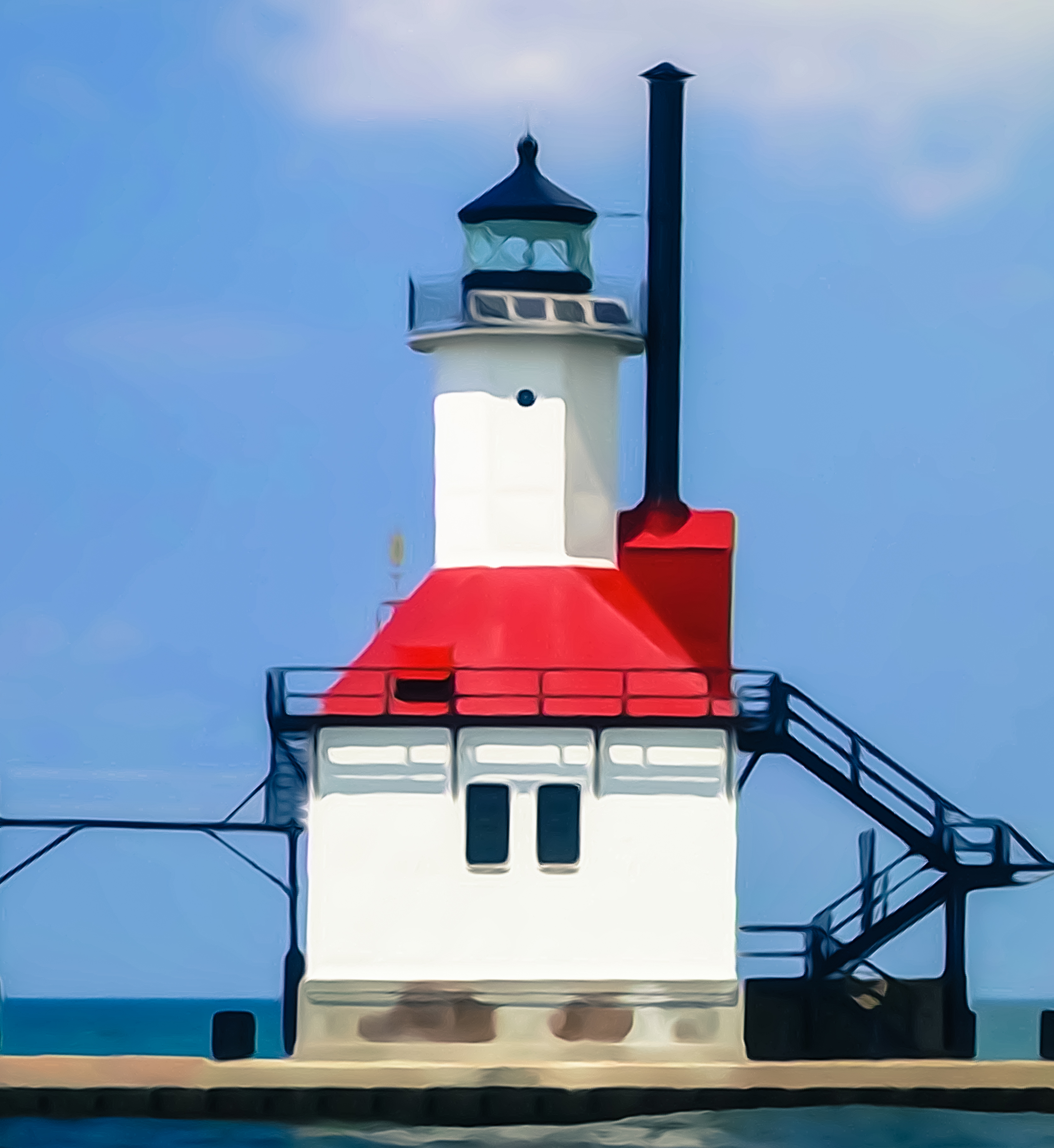
- Constructed: 1907
- Foundation: Pier
- Construction: Steel
- Height: 57 feet (17 m)
- Shape: Octagonal
- Markings: Red/black/white
- Heritage: National Register of Historic Places contributing property
- First lit: 1907
- Focal height: 17 m (56 ft)
- Lens: Fourth order
- Range: 7 nautical miles (13 km; 8.1 mi)
- Characteristic: Iso W 2s
- St. Joseph North Pier Outer Light
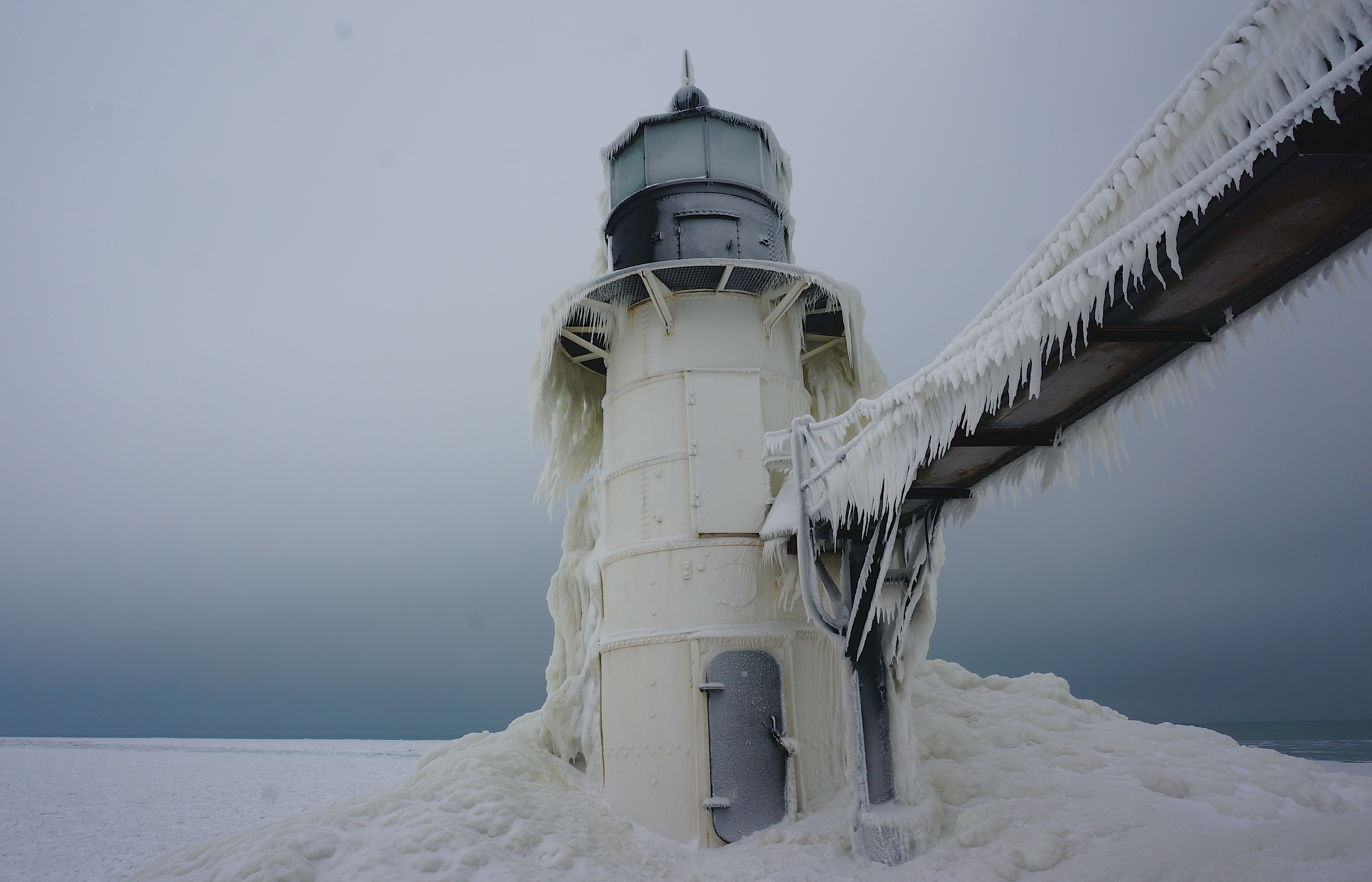
- Constructed: 1906
- Foundation: Pier
- Construction: Cast iron
- Height: 35 feet (11 m)
- Shape: Cylindrical
- Markings: Black/white
- Heritage: National Register of Historic Places contributing property
- First lit: 1906
- Focal height: 31 feet (9.4 m)
- Lens: Fifth order Fresnel lens
- Range: 12 nautical miles (22 km; 14 mi)
- Characteristic: Fl W 2.5s
- St. Joseph North Pier Inner and Outer Lights
- U.S. National Register of Historic Places
- NRHP reference No.: 05001211
- Added to NRHP: November 9, 2005

The St. Joseph North Pier Inner and Outer Lights are lighthouses in St. Joseph, Michigan, US, at the entrance to the St. Joseph River on Lake Michigan. The station was built in 1832 with the current lights built in 1906 and 1907; they were decommissioned in 2005.

== History ==
St. Joseph was first platted in 1829, and the first lighthouse at the site, located on the shore, was built in 1832. Construction began on harbor piers in 1836, and by 1848 a beacon light had been established on the pier. The onshore lighthouse was replaced in 1859, and a new pierhead beacon was constructed on the south pier in 1870. In 1881, this beacon was transferred to the north pier. In 1897 a pole light was erected 400 feet shoreward to serve as a rear range light. In 1904, the pier was extended, and the range lights were moved lakeward. In 1906–1907, the present set of range lights was constructed.

The 1859 lighthouse remained in use until 1919 when a tower was erected on the south pier. It was demolished in 1955. The lights were decommissioned in 2005. In 2008, the north pier inner and outer range lights were deemed excess. Ownership of the lights was transferred to the city of St. Joseph in 2013. A committee was formed in 2014 which raised $2 million in private donations to fully restore the pier range lights. The project to preserve the lighthouses was completed in 2016.

The foghorn at the station was converted to electronic in 1970.

=== Postage stamp ===
On June 17, 1995, the United States Postal Service issued a stamp depicting the lights as part of its Great Lakes Lighthouses series.

== Description ==
The front range tower is constructed of steel framing and covered with metal sheets. It is a conical tower that tapers from a diameter of eight feet, three inches at its base to seven feet, three inches at the top. It is topped by a nine-sided lantern room. The tower is equipped with a fifth-order Barbier and Benard lens that produced a fixed red light. The entire structure is 30 feet tall.

The rear tower is a square steel structure, 24 feet on a side, with a pyramidal roof. On top of the roof is an octagonal tower, rising two stories above the main structure. Atop the tower is a circular lantern room with helical bars, surrounded by a black iron parapet and walkway. The tower was originally equipped with a fourth-order lens manufactured by Chance Brothers that produced a fixed red light. This lens was replaced at some point with a Fourth Order Fresnel lens manufactured by Sautter & Cie. A catwalk extends from the second story of the lighthouse along the pier to the shoreline. A smokestack was removed from the tower in 1949 and another was added in 2016.

== Gallery ==
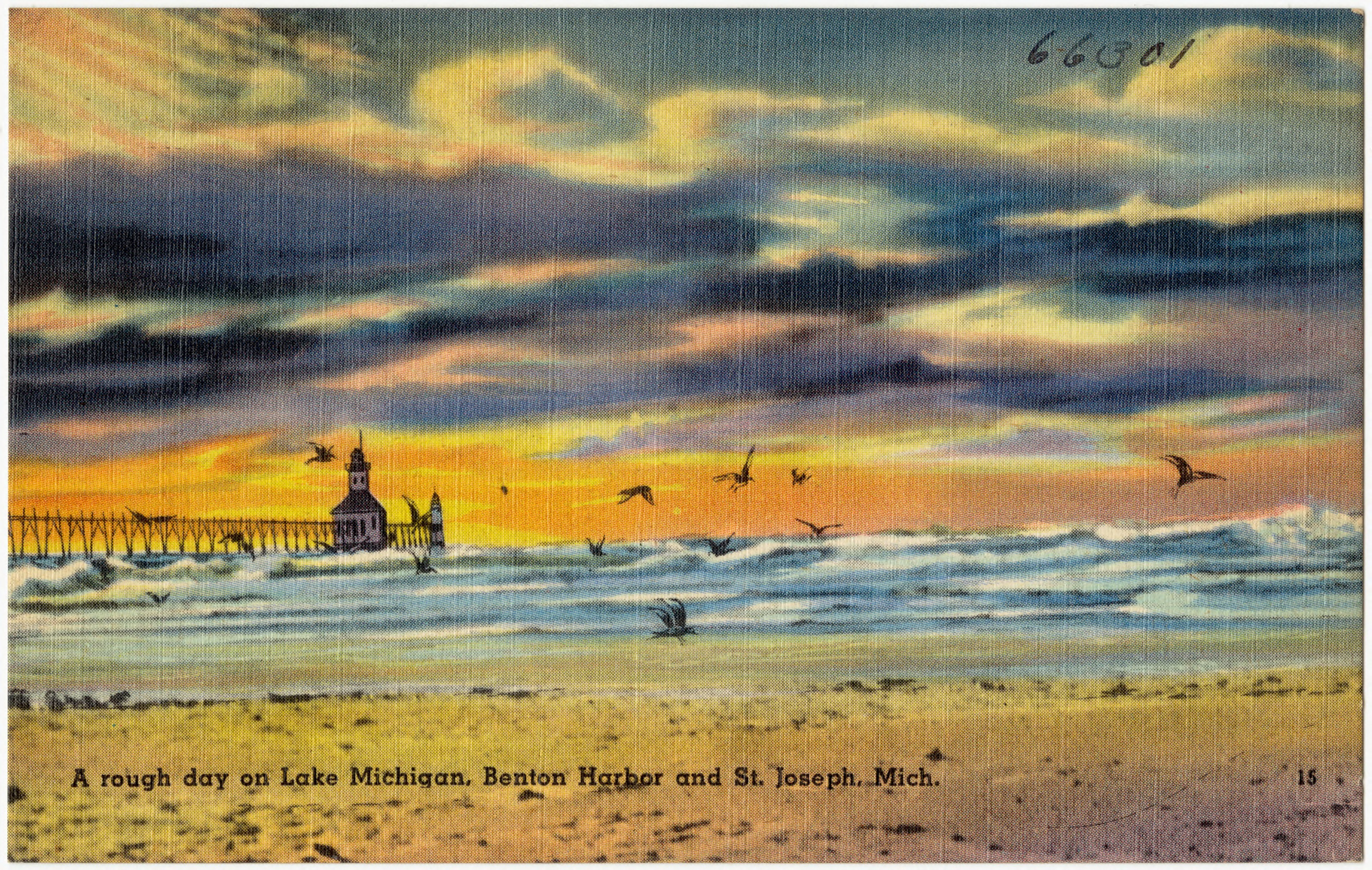
Postcard, c. 1940

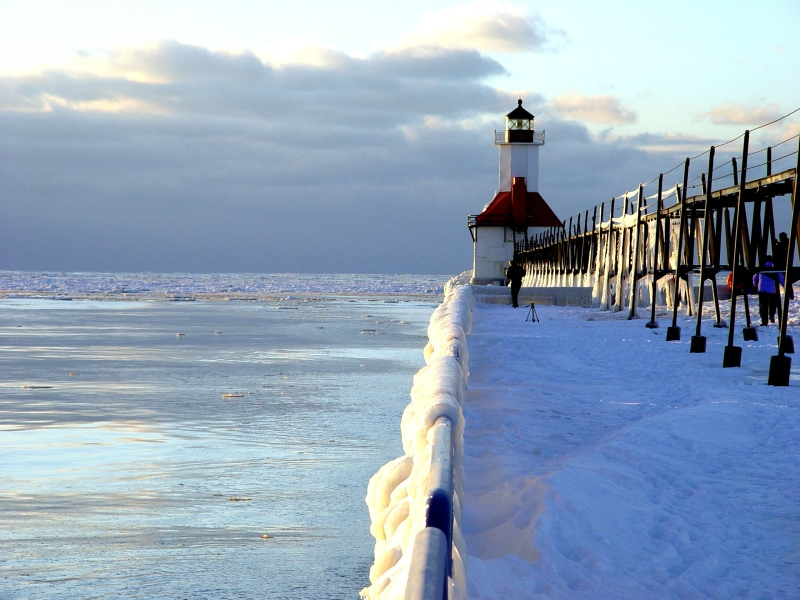
Winter, 2004

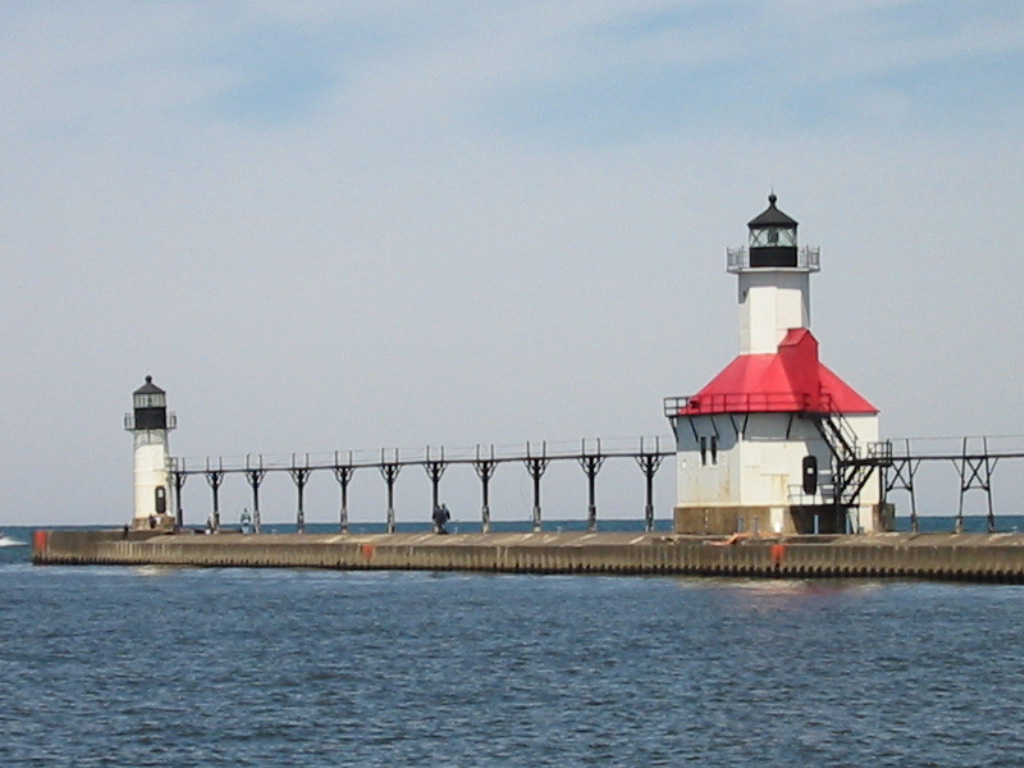
Summer, 2004

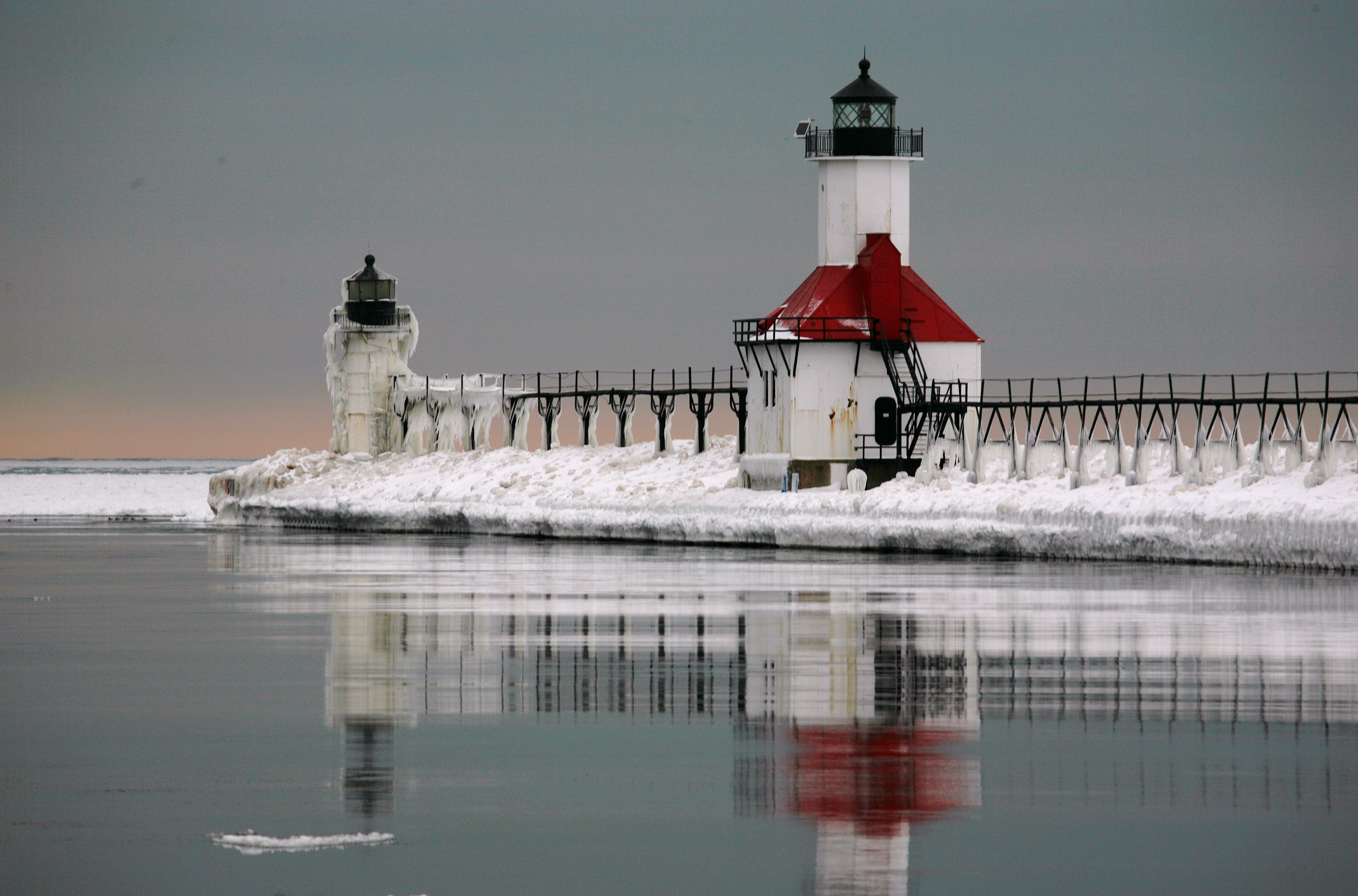
Winter, 2010

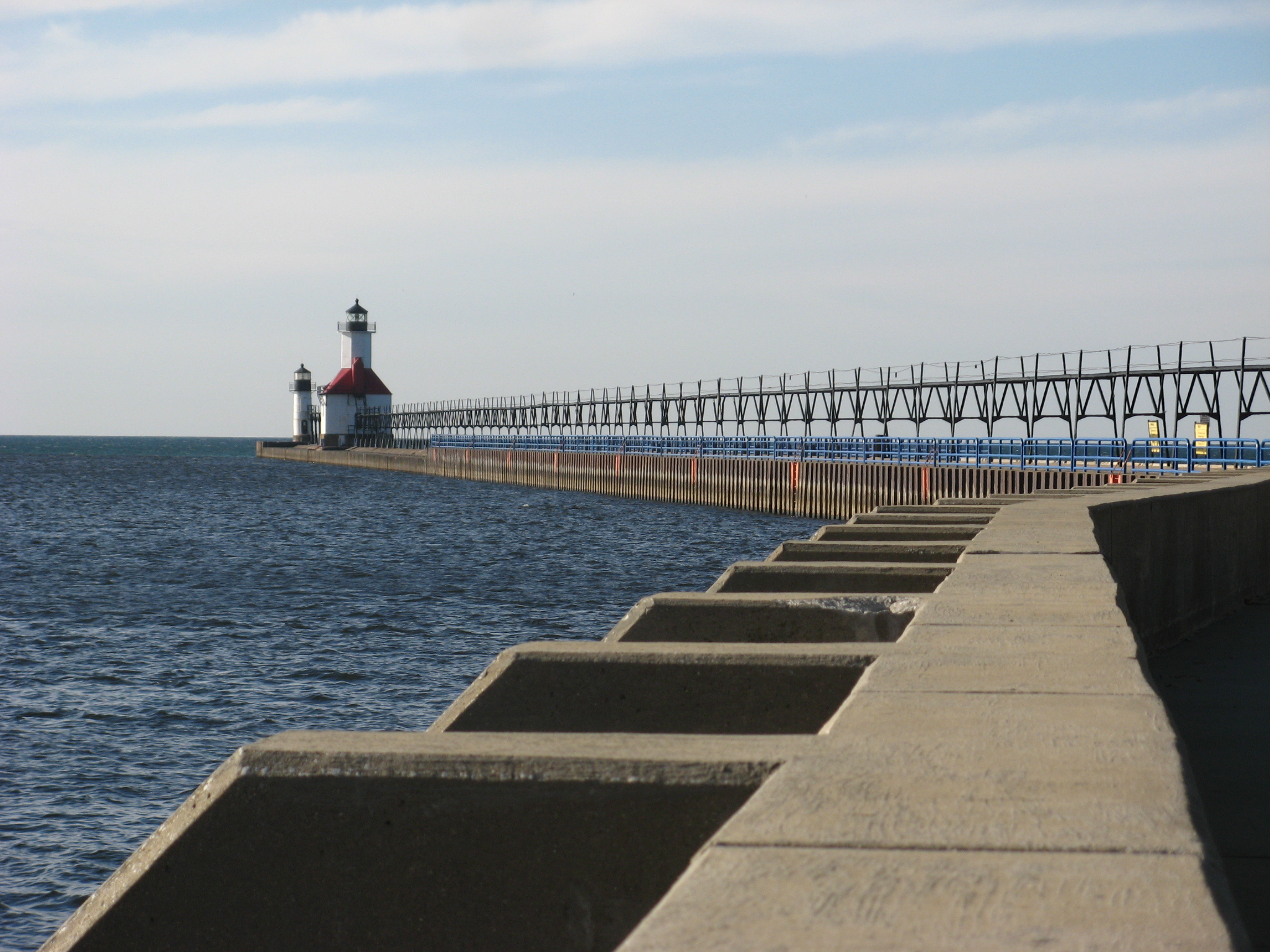
Pier, 2008

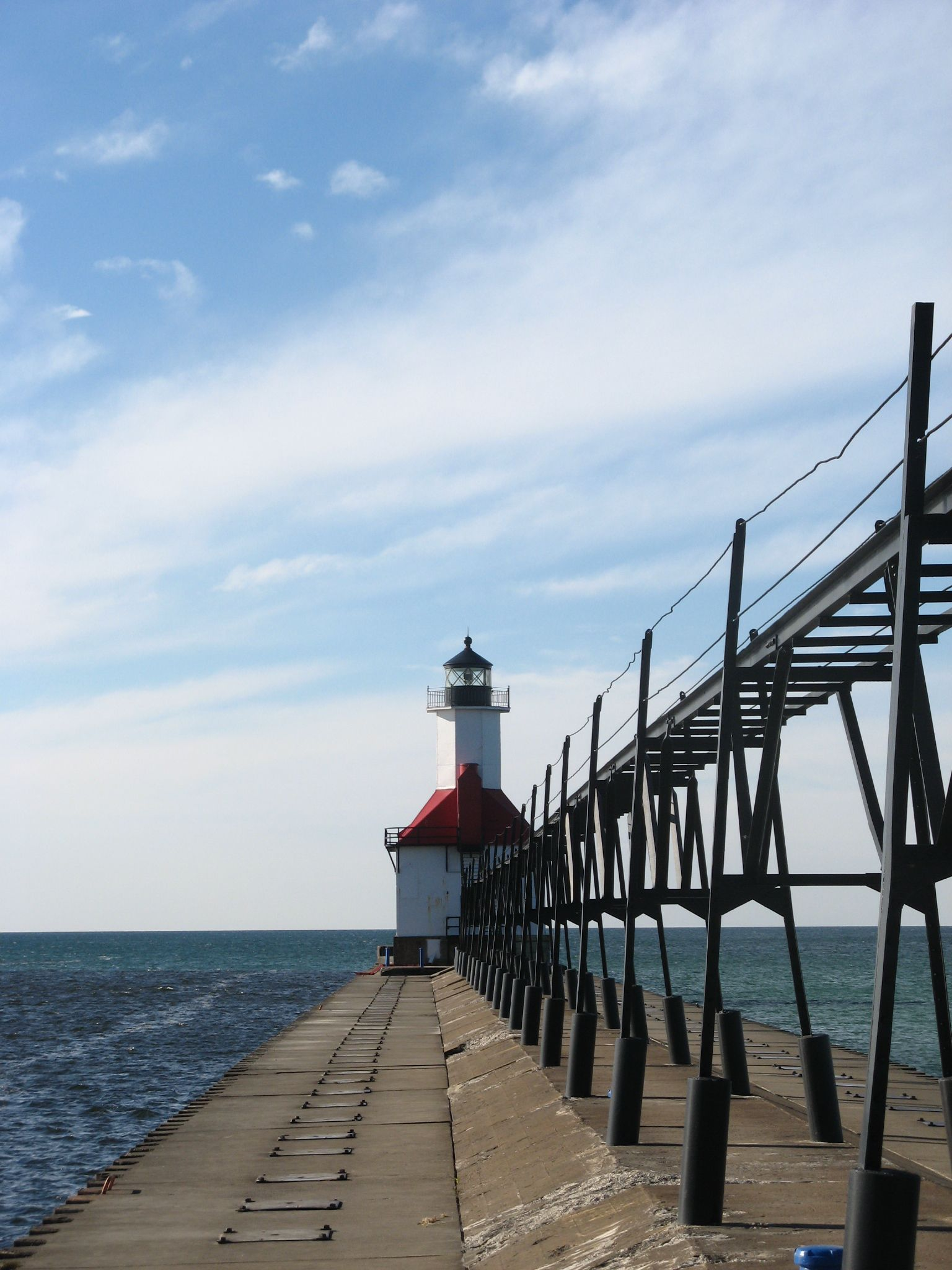
Pier, 2008

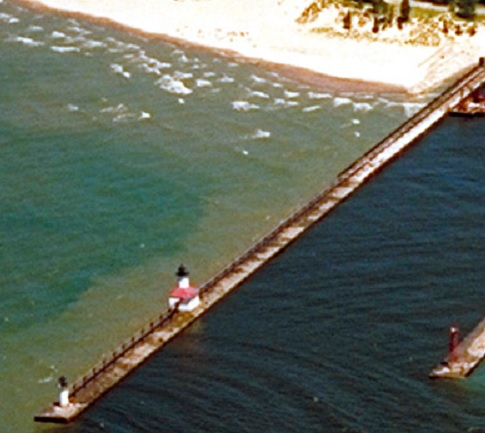
Aerial view
