= Presque Isle Harbor Breakwater Light =

Lighthouse in Michigan, United States

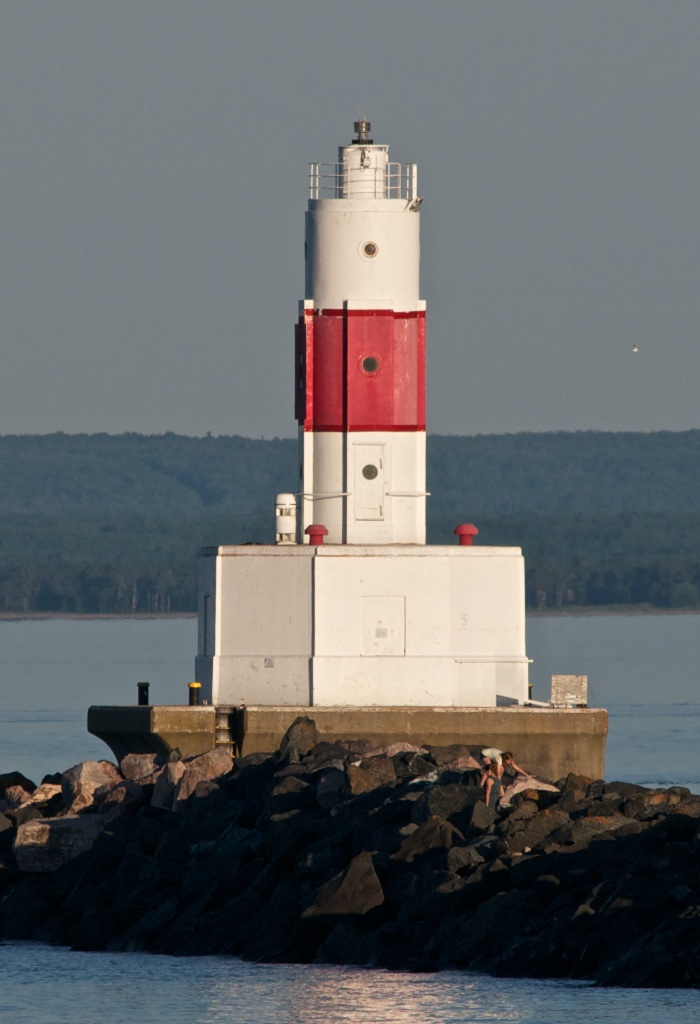
- Location: Breakwater at northeast side of Presque Isle Harbor, Marquette, Michigan
- Coordinates: 46°34′27″N 87°22′28″W

Tower
- Constructed: 1941
- Construction: steel tower
- Automated: 1970s
- Height: Tower - 55 feet (17 m)
- Shape: round cylindrical
- Markings: white with red band
- Heritage: National Register of Historic Places listed place

Light
- First lit: 1941
- Focal height: 56 feet (17 m)
- Lens: 375 mm lens (original), LED optic (current)
- Range: 10 nmi (19 km; 12 mi)
- Characteristic: Fl Red, 4 sec
- Presque Isle Harbor Breakwater Light
- U.S. National Register of Historic Places
- Built: 1941
- Architectural style: Streamline Moderne
- NRHP reference No.: 16000339
- Added to NRHP: June 7, 2016

The Presque Isle Harbor Breakwater Light is a lighthouse located on the breakwater at northeast side of Presque Isle Harbor in Marquette, Michigan. It was listed on the National Register of Historic Places in 2016.

== History ==
Between 1897 and 1902, the United States Army Corps of Engineers constructed a 1,216-foot breakwater extending southeast from Marquette's Presque Isle to protect the adjacent Presque Isle Harbor. Beginning in 1935, the Corps undertook another major project to improve Presque Isle Harbor by dredging the port and extending the breakwater another 1600 feet. In conjunction with this project, in 1938 the United States Lighthouse Service announced plans and place an automated lighthouse at the end of the breakwater. The breakwater project was completed in 1939, and the lighthouse in 1941.

The lighthouse was maintained by Coast Guard personnel stationed at the Marquette Harbor Light until some time in the 1970s, when the Breakwater Light was automated. It continues to serve as an aid to navigation, marking the offshore end of the breakwater.

== Description ==
The Presque Isle Harbor Breakwater Lighthouse is approximately 55 feet tall, and includes a rectangular concrete pier at the base, an octagonal concrete first story, and three-story steel light tower. The tower is painted white with a red band at the midway point. The light is constructed in a Streamline Moderne style.

The concrete pier at the base measures 32 feet by 32 feet, and extends approximately 14 feet above the water level, with a flat top deck. The sides of the pier facing the lake curve outward at the top, forming a lip to deflect waves. Atop the pier is an octagonal concrete superstructure, approximately 22 feet wide and 11 feet tall. The superstructure has three windows and a door, regularly placed around the structure. The doorway includes a cast concrete decorative surround that frames the entry on top and sides. The interior of the structure holds three rooms and a closet. A ladder and opening in the ceiling provides access to the tower above.

The steel plate tower is approximately 30 feet tall, and includes three stories and a small cupola topped with the lighthouse's optic. The lower two stories are shaped like a stylized octagon with four flat and four curved sides. The upper story and cupola are circular. Each floor has three 15" port lights; in addition, the first story has a door, the second holes that once held the resonator horns, and the third a smaller port light. The cupola is approximately 3 feet in diameter, and sits atop the upper story surrounded by a circular open-air gallery.
