= Round Island Light (St. Mary's River) =

Lighthouse in Michigan, United States

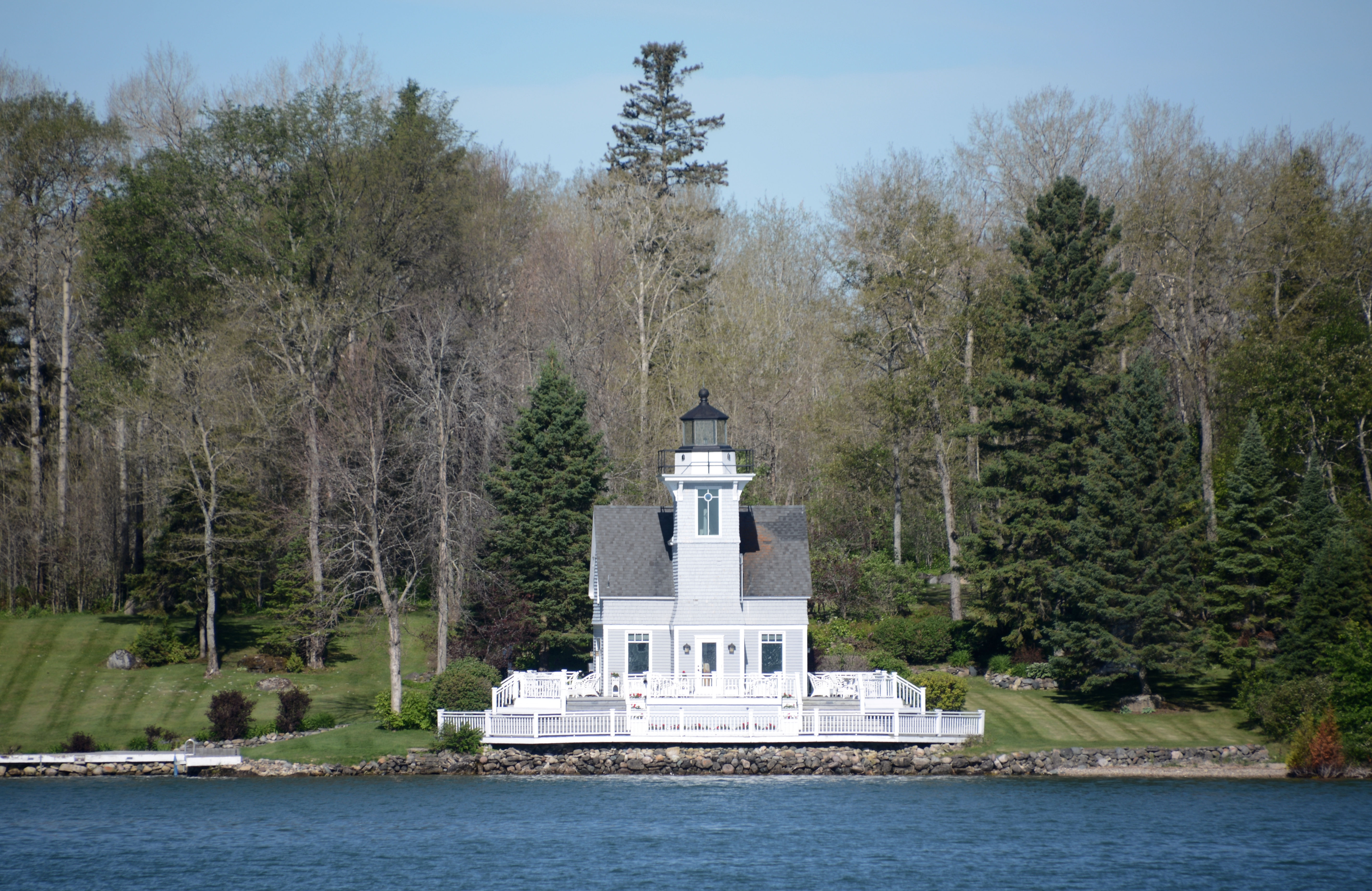
- Location: Chippewa County, United States
- Coordinates: 46°06′31″N 84°01′11″W

Tower
- Construction: concrete (foundation), wood (tower)
- Markings: Grey (tower), white (trim), black (cupola)

Light
- First lit: 1892
- Deactivated: 1922

Round Island Light is a lighthouse on Round Island in the St. Marys River. It is in Michigan, about a mile from the Ontario border.

== History ==
The St. Mary's River flows from Lake Superior to Lake Huron. After the locks at Sault Ste. Marie were built in 1855, traffic on the river gradually increased and in 1891 Congress appropriated $30,000 for construction of lights along the river. Round Island Light was put into service in 1892.

It was discontinued in 1922 in favor of a steel structure to the north of the house.

== Getting there ==
Round Island Light is one of over 150 past and present lighthouses in Michigan. Michigan has more lighthouses than any other state. See Lighthouses in the United States.
