= Point Iroquois Light =

Lighthouse in Michigan, United States

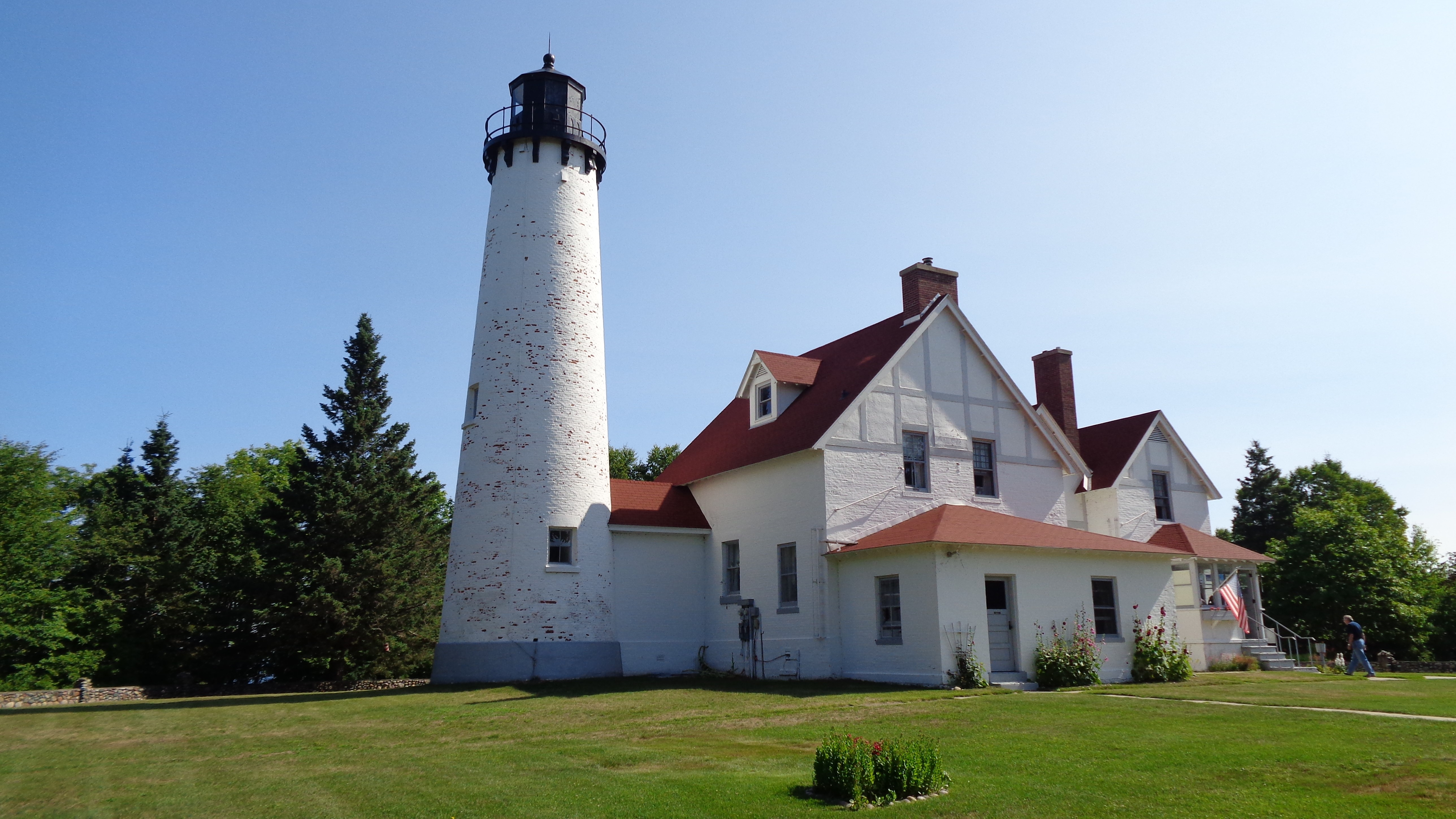
- Point Iroquois Light (July 2018)
- Location: Whitefish Bay, Michigan
- Coordinates: 46°29.021′N 84°37.541′W

Tower
- Constructed: 1856
- Foundation: Cement
- Construction: Brick
- Automated: 1962
- Height: 65 feet (20 m)
- Shape: Frustum of a cone
- Markings: White tower, black parapet and lantern
- Heritage: National Register of Historic Places listed place

Light
- First lit: 1856 / 1870
- Deactivated: 1971
- Focal height: 72 feet (22 m)
- Lens: Fourth-order Fresnel lens
- Range: 13 nautical miles; 24 kilometres (15 mi)
- Characteristic: flash every 30 seconds
- Point Iroquois Light Station
- U.S. National Register of Historic Places
- Michigan State Historic Site
- Nearest city: Brimley, Michigan
- Area: less than 1-acre (0.40 ha)
- Built: 1870
- NRHP reference No.: 75000940
- Added to NRHP: May 30, 1975

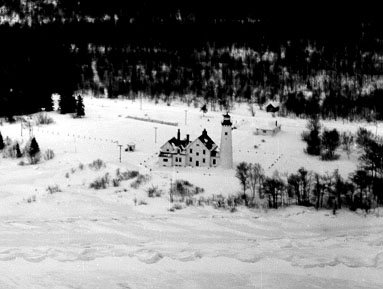
Historical photo of Point Iroquois Light

Point Iroquois Light is a lighthouse on a Chippewa County bluff in the U.S. state of Michigan. Point Iroquois and its light mark the division line between Whitefish Bay and the western end of the St. Marys River, the connection between Lake Superior and other Great Lakes.

Point Iroquois includes a larger geographic area than the light station site. It was named for the Iroquois warriors massacred there by the Ojibwe in 1662. Native Algonkians called the point "Nadouenigoning", composed of the words "Nadone" (Iroquois) and "Akron" (bone).

== History ==
In 1620, French explorers Étienne Brûlé and Grenoble became the first recorded white men to the area. "From that time, Point Iroquois became a familiar landmark" for French explorers, fur traders and missionaries who followed. Sault Ste. Marie was the first white settlement in what became known as Michigan.

=== First lighthouse ===
In 1853 Congress, which had approved the construction of the first Soo Locks on the St. Mary's River, appropriated $5,000 for the construction of what would be the first lighthouse at Point Iroquois. In 1855-1856 the United States Lighthouse Board implemented this appropriation and built a wood and rubble stone lighthouse at the Point; this aid to navigation commenced operations on June 18, 1856. The first Point Iroquois light was a 45-foot-tall (14 m) rubble stone tower with a wooden lantern deck, outfitted with a flashing white fourth order Fresnel lens. Being built on the Point's highest ground, this first light had a 63-foot (19 m) focal plane, and a range of visibility of 10 nautical miles (19 km; 12 mi). A dwelling for a full-time lightkeeper was included as part of the complex. The St. Martin Reef Light is a twin of this first light station.

However, as early as 1867, only eleven years after the first light went into operation, a government inspector was questioning the construction quality of the first light station and preparing the ground for its replacement. Furthermore, following the American Civil War, the United States Lighthouse Board had entered a lighthouse (and life saving station) building boom on the Great Lakes.

=== Second lighthouse and light station ===
In 1870, after the first lighthouse and keepers' quarters building were torn down. the second and current Point Iroquois Light was constructed, this time at an estimated cost of $18,000. The present Cape Cod style white brick lighthouse was built and ran continuously for 93 years, guiding ships in and out of the Soo Locks. It has a 65-foot (20 m) tower height, and a focal plane that is variously reported as 68 or 72 feet (21 or 22 m). The new Light and keepers' quarters became visual focuses of the shoreline lumber community of Brimley, Michigan.

==== Its buildings ====
In 1885, a bell tower was erected, which incorporated a Stevens automatic bell striking machine. In 1890, the bell tower was torn down, and a fog signal building was built with steam whistles installed. In 1926 they were replaced by Type F diaphone fog horns.

In 1905, a two-floor extension was added to the 1871 building, providing living space for another assistant keeper, bringing the staff to three Lighthouse keepers. At peak operation, the station was manned by a Head Keeper and two Assistant Keepers. The children of the keepers and local fisherman were enough to populate a local school on the grounds for a period. Other buildings on the site included: an assistant keeper's quarters, fog signal building (now gone), three barns, a chicken house, boat house, oil house, outhouse and well house.

=== Deactivation ===
The station was deactivated in 1962, replaced by the Canadian operated Gros Cap Reefs Light, an unmanned buoy-type beacon in the St. Marys River channel.

In 1993 the light quarters and light were completely renovated.

In 1975 the Point Iroquois Light was listed on the National Register of Historic Places Reference #75000940. It is also on the state list.

== The Point Iroquois Light today ==
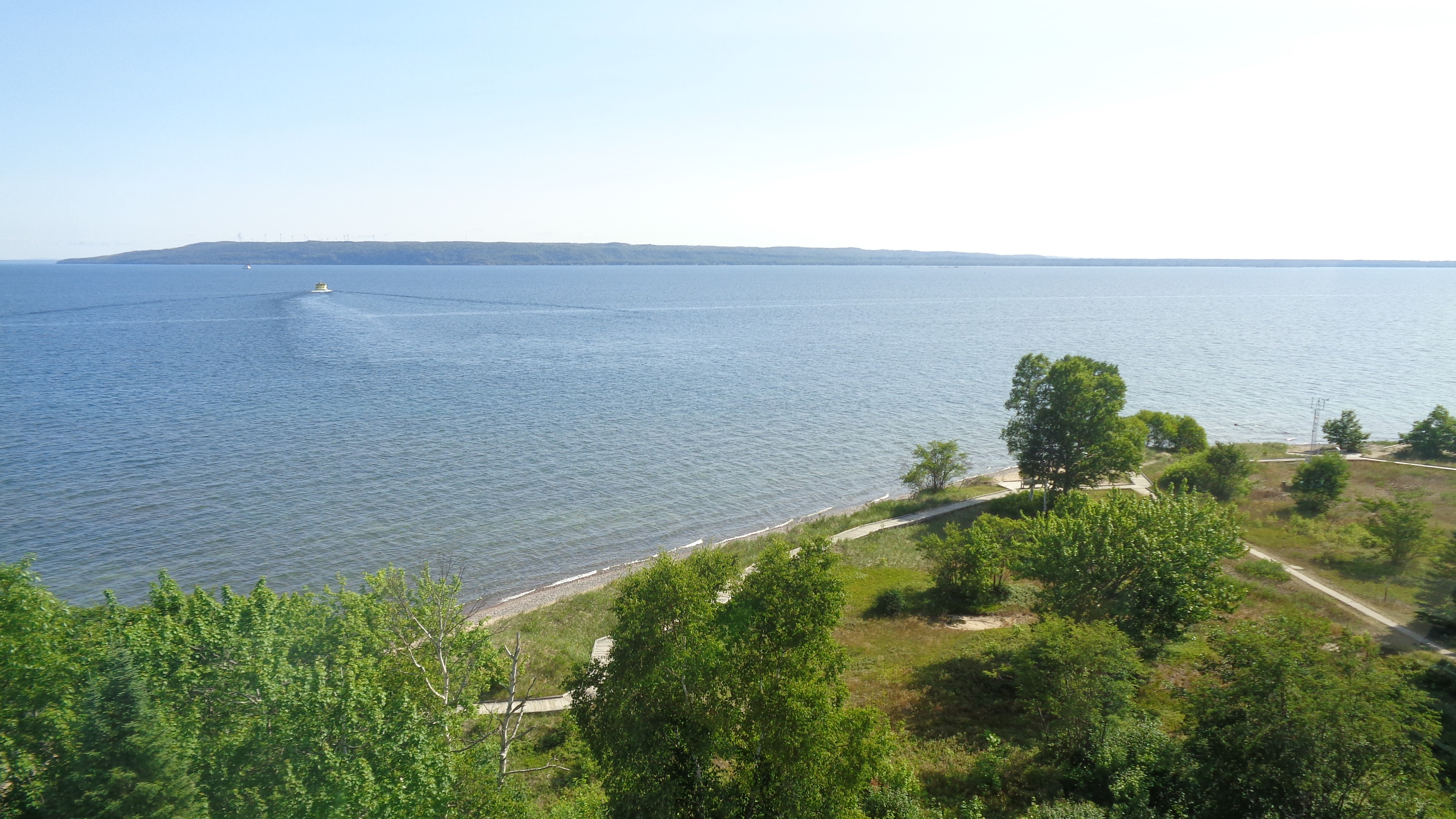
View from the lighthouse tower facing northeast toward Canada

It is considered to be iconic, and has been the subject of memorabilia.

The land and lighthouse are now part of the Hiawatha National Forest and the light is a Marine Museum. Restoration efforts are being conducted under the auspices of the Bay Mills/Brimley Historical Research Society, to whom the site is leased.

In 1963, the original lens was sent to the Smithsonian Institution. A fourth order Fresnel lens taken from Martin Reef Light is on display in the Lighthouse keeper's house.

The museum has one apartment furnished to give an idea of the lightkeepers' everyday lives. Other rooms show lighthouse technology, history of navigational aids, and historical photos. This light station housed three families. The double residence houses volunteers who work on the lighthouse restoration and give tours of the museum, gift shop and tower.

- The tower and museum are open to the public from Memorial Day through October 15. Operations are seven days per week. Everyday from 10:00 a.m. to 5.00 p.m., seven days a week. Open weekends, Friday through Sunday, they reopen from 7:00 p.m. to 9:00 p.m.
- M-221 into Brimley, Michigan then turn left onto 6 Mile Rd which leads to the lighthouse about 7.5 miles (12.1 km) down the road.

== See also ==
- Comet (steamboat)
- Lighthouses in the United States
- Great Lakes Storm of 1913 and Shipwrecks of the 1913 Great Lakes storm
