= Pipe Island Light =

Lighthouse in Michigan, United States

- Location: Pipe Island, Michigan
- Coordinates: 46°0′58.8″N 83°53′57.5″W

Tower
- Constructed: 1888
- Construction: Brick
- Height: 52 feet (16 m)
- Shape: Octagonal
- Markings: KRW on yellow octagonal tower with black skeleton superstructure

Light
- Range: 11 nautical miles (20 km; 13 mi)
- Characteristic: Fl W 5s
- United States no.: 12875

Pipe Island Light is a privately owned lighthouse on Pipe Island in St. Mary's River, Michigan. It was lit in 1888 by the Lake Carriers Association to help ships entering St. Mary's River from Lake Huron. In 2005 three cottages and the Victorian keeper's dwelling were made available for overnight stays.
