= Grand Island Harbor Rear Range Light =

Lighthouse in Michigan, United States

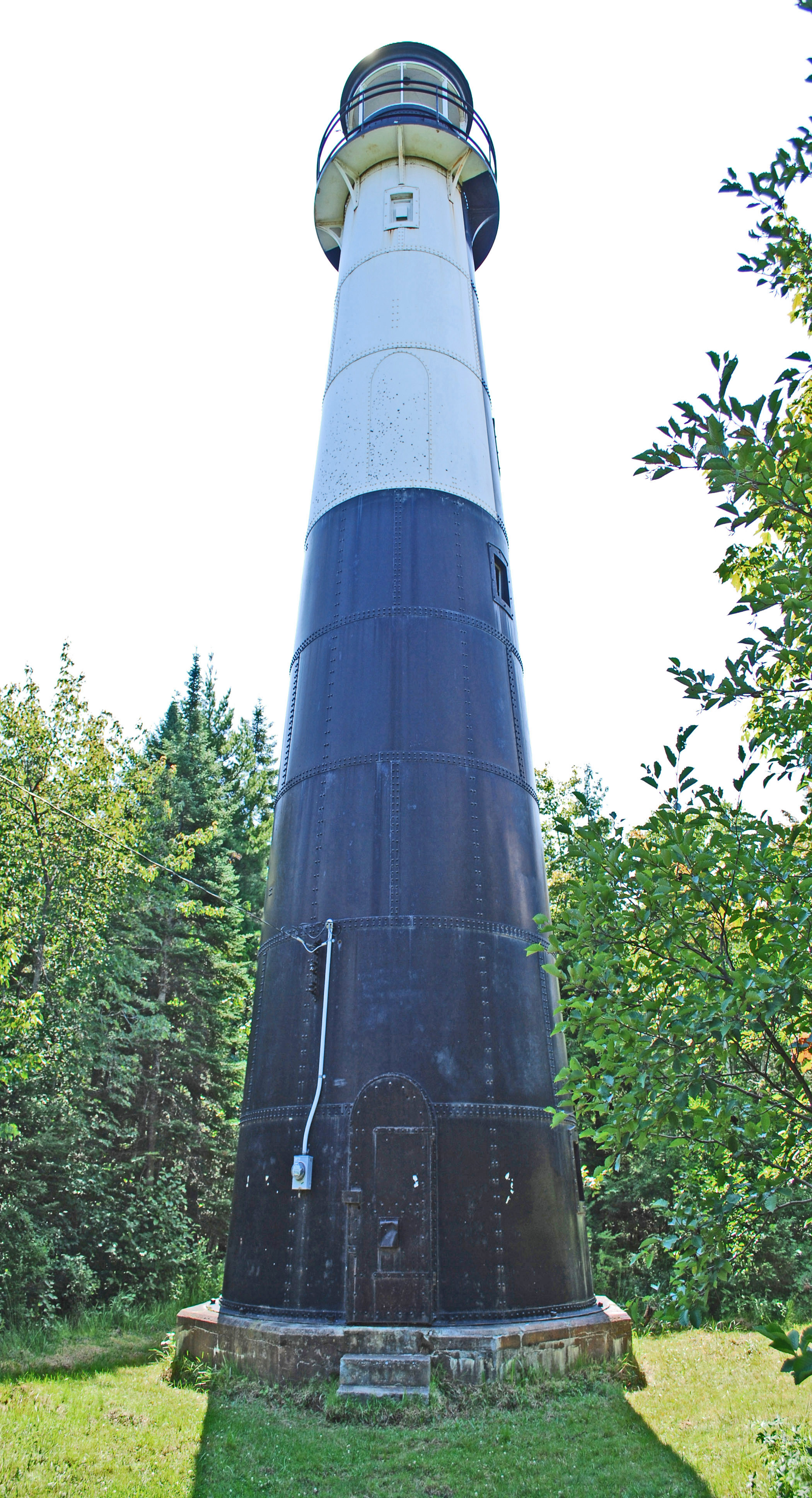
- Rear Range Light
- Location: Munising Township, Michigan
- Coordinates: 46°26′12″N 86°41′28″W

Tower
- Constructed: 1868
- Foundation: Concrete pier
- Construction: Steel
- Automated: 1914
- Height: 64 feet (20 m)
- Shape: Frustum of a cone
- Markings: Black and white Daymark tower/black lantern
- Heritage: National Register of Historic Places listed place

Light
- First lit: 1914
- Deactivated: 1969
- Focal height: 70 feet (21 m)
- Lens: Sixth-order Fresnel lens
- Range: 13 nautical miles; 24 kilometres (15 mi)
- Characteristic: F W
- Grand Island Harbor Rear Range Light
- U.S. National Register of Historic Places
- Nearest city: Christmas, Michigan
- Area: less than one acre
- Architect: US Coast Guard
- Architectural style: Conical Steel Tower
- NRHP reference No.: 90000906
- Added to NRHP: June 26, 1990

The Grand Island Harbor Rear Range Light is a lighthouse located off M-28 in Munising Township, Michigan. It is also known as the Bay Furnace Rear Range Light, Christmas Rear Range Light, or End of the Road Light. The corresponding front range light was replaced in 1968; the rear range light was listed on the National Register of Historic Places in 1990. It is no longer an active aid to navigation.

The grounds only are publicly accessible, but a hike is required.

== History ==
The Grand Island Range Lights were lit first in 1868. The original front range light was a wooden pyramid that held a sixth-order Fresnel lens. The original rear range light was a sixth-order Fresnel lens in a wooden tower atop a frame keeper's house, 500 feet (150 m) to the rear of the front range light.

By 1914, these original frame structures were severely rotted, and both were replaced as part of a broader effort of replacing nearly all harbor lights with steel-framed structures. The new front range light was a 23-foot-tall (7.0 m) iron mast. A new automated rear range light was installed 750 feet (230 m) to the rear of the front range light. The new rear range light was a 64-foot (20 m) tower, the upper half (painted white) of which was part of a tower originally located at the Vidal Shoals. near Sault Ste. Marie. In 1939, the sixth-order Fresnel lenses were replaced with 350 millimeter glass lenses, which still used acetylene gas. In 1968, the front range light was replaced with a "D9" style tubular steel structure; in 1969 the lights were deactivated.

== Rear range light description ==
The 1914 Rear Range Light is a steel conical tower, 64 feet (20 m) high, with a round lantern. The light of one of the tallest, if not the tallest, of the riveted steel plate light towers installed around the Great Lakes. The tower sits on a concrete foundation; a metal door in the base of the tower and interior spiral stair provides access to the light. The tower is painted black on the bottom and white on the top, with a black lantern room. The existing light was built in 1914 replacing the original 1868 station.

== Gallery ==
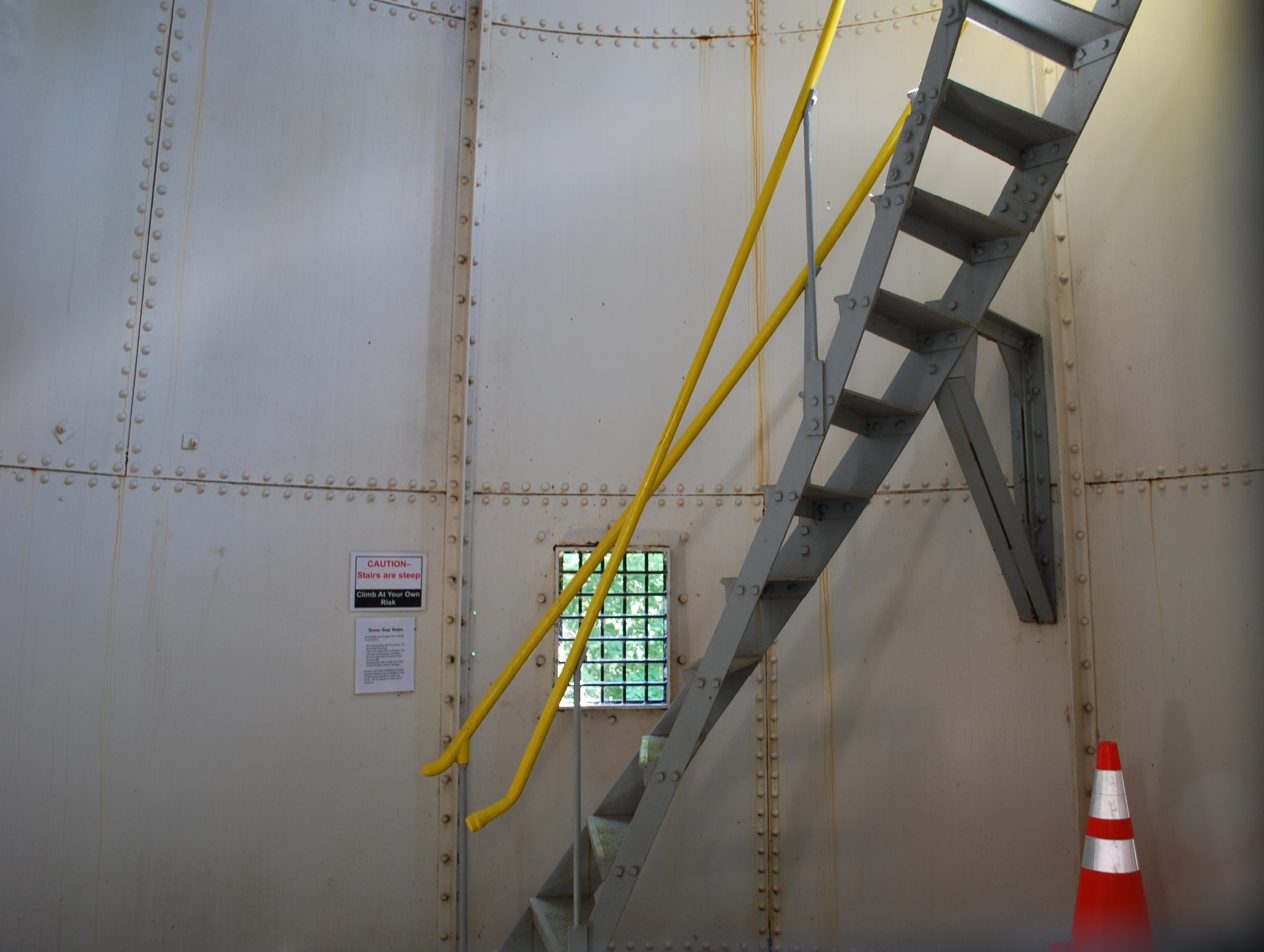
Interior of rear range light

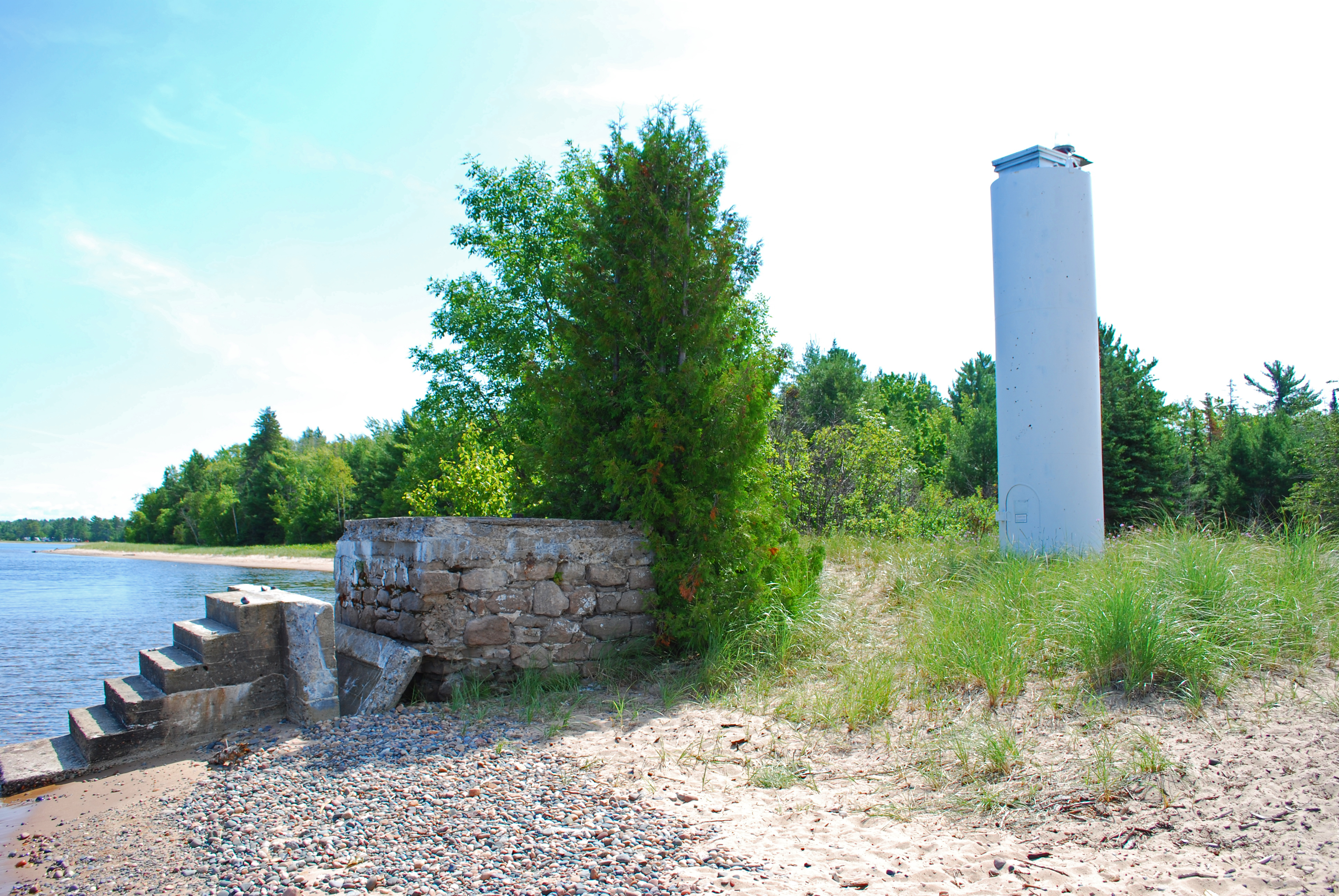
1968 front range light; foundation of 1914 front range light is to left

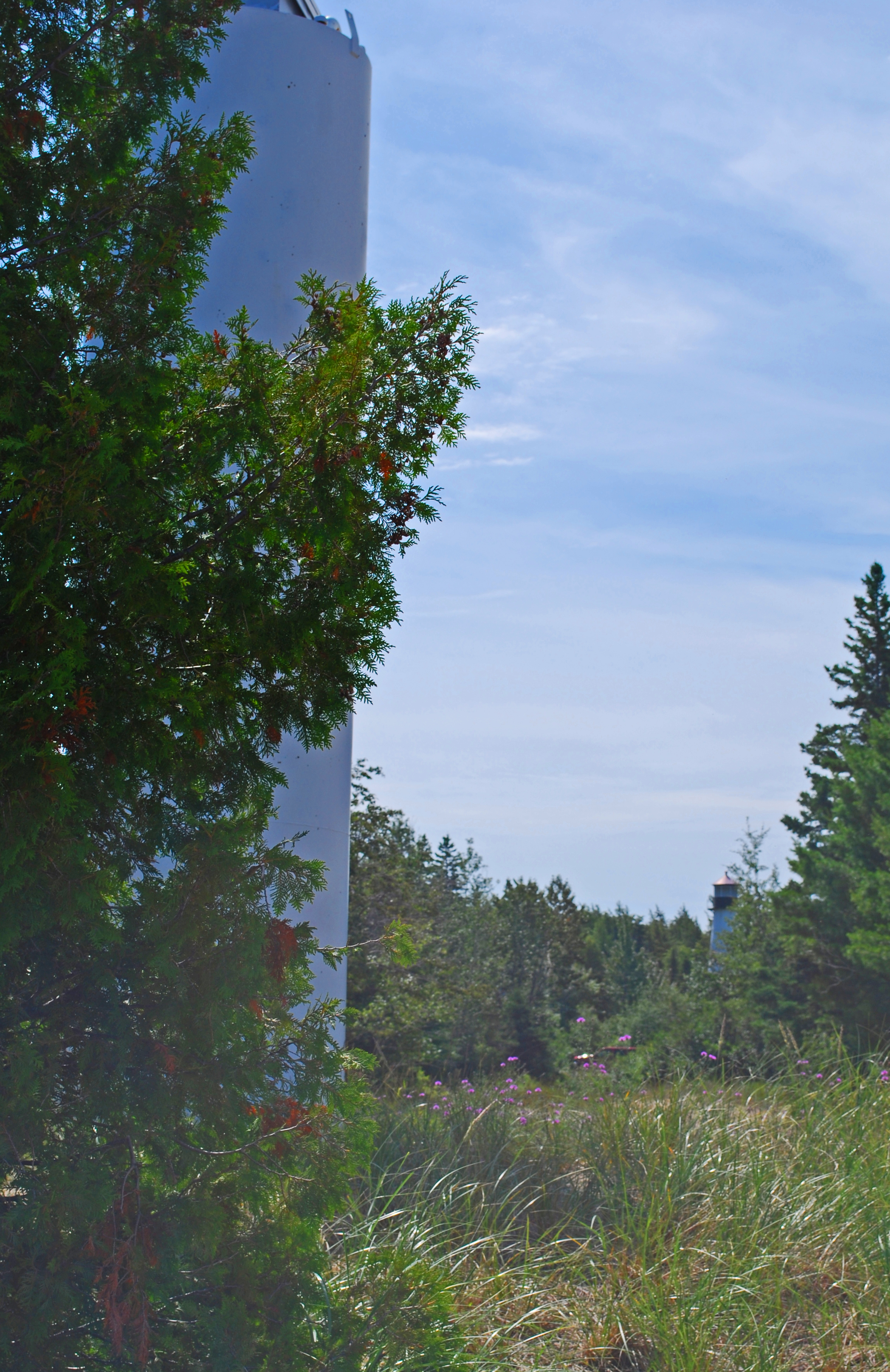
Front range light, with rear in background
