= Muskegon Pier Light =

Lighthouse in Michigan, United States

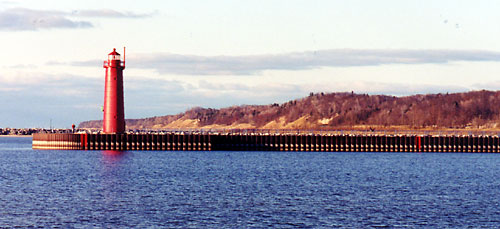
- Muskegon Pier Lighthouse
- Location: Muskegon, Michigan
- Coordinates: 43°13′35.952″N 86°20′28.544″W

Tower
- Constructed: 1851
- Foundation: Pier
- Construction: Cast iron
- Height: 48 feet (15 m)
- Shape: Conical
- Markings: Red
- Heritage: National Register of Historic Places listed place

Light
- First lit: 1903
- Focal height: 50 feet (15 m)
- Lens: fourth order Fresnel lens (Sautter & Cie) (original), 12-inch (300 mm) acrylic (current)
- Range: 6 nautical miles (11 km; 6.9 mi)
- Characteristic: red flash every 4s
- Muskegon South Pierhead Light
- U.S. National Register of Historic Places
- Architect: U.S. Lighthouse Establishment
- MPS: Light Stations of the United States MPS
- NRHP reference No.: 06000036
- Added to NRHP: February 14, 2006

The Muskegon South Pierhead Light or Muskegon Pier Light is a lighthouse located on the channel in the harbor of Muskegon, Michigan.

This site is accessible to the public by walking through the pedestrian walkway between the NOAA and USCG stations. The lighthouse is available for tower tours during the summer months between Memorial Day and Halloween weekends. Up-to-date hours are available at www.muskegonlights.org

== History ==
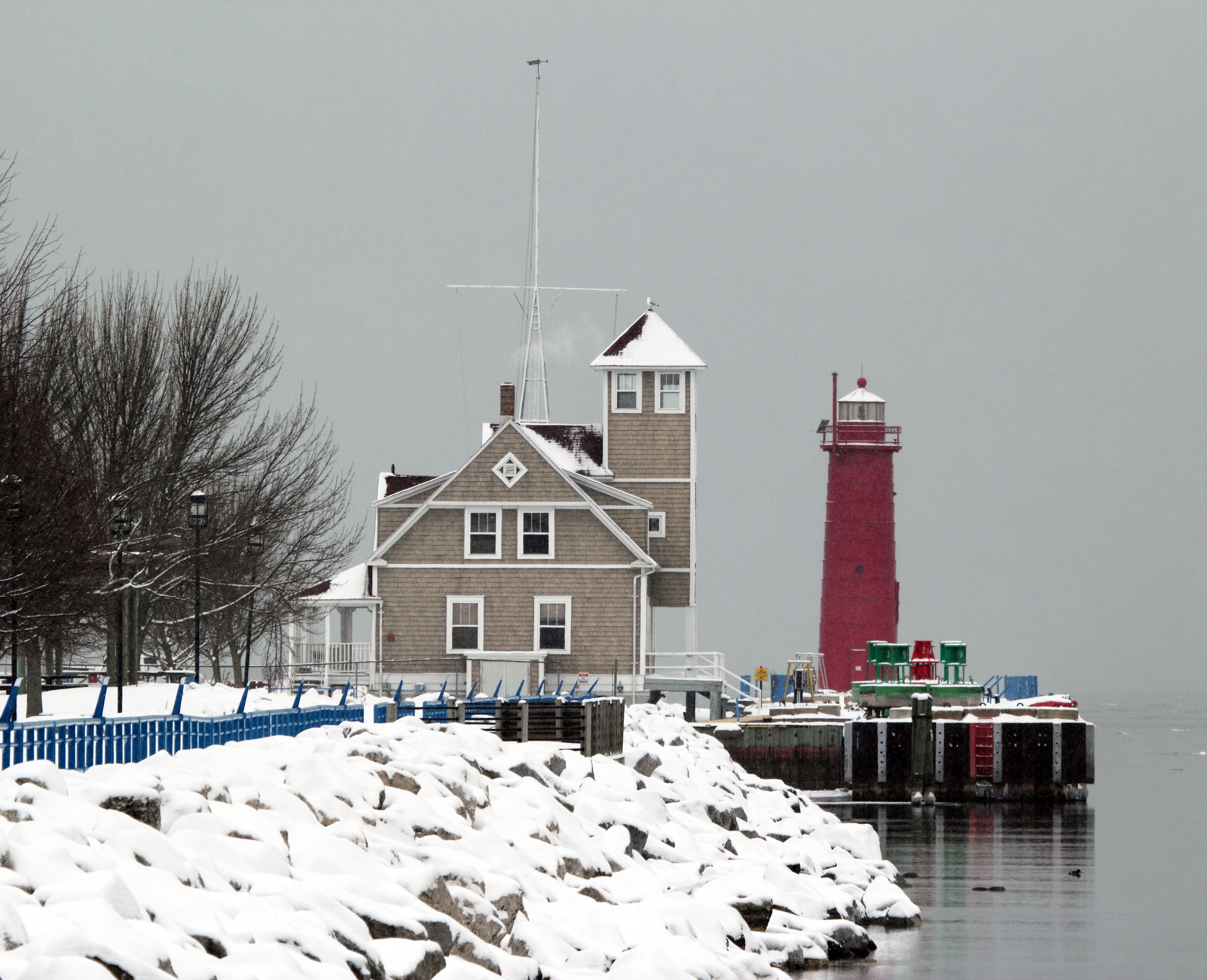

Built in 1851, Muskegon's first lighthouse was a brick structure. This Lightkeeper's dwelling was located at the intersection of Beach & Fulton, near the Muskegon channel, and was topped with a wooden light tower in its center. Unfortunately, no known photographs of this structure exist. In 1870, a new one and half story wooden-frame Lightkeeper's dwelling was built and painted white. It was constructed with a short, square wooden tower on the front side of the structure, rising above its gabled roof. Replacing the deteriorating 1851 lighthouse, this structure was built on the same parcel of land and topped with a cast-iron lantern room. The next year, a beacon light was built at the end of the pier, extending out from the channel on the south side with an elevated catwalk. As time went on, the piers were extended even further, and a fog horn structure was built with an elevated catwalk to connect the beacon light to the fog horn in 1899.

The existing Muskegon South Pierhead Light conical steel tower replaced the wooden rear range beacon light in 1903, utilizing the original, historic lantern room from the previous 1870 lighthouse structure.

In 1927, construction began on the arrowhead harbor, which lasted several years. The Muskegon South Breakwater Light was temporary established in 1929 and the steel, pyramidal-designed tower and fog horn were completed in 1930 to mark the outer end of the breakwall. In 1931, the Muskegon South Pierhead Light fog horn, catwalk and extension were removed and the piers were shortened, leaving the pier at the length visible today.

The lights were declared excess property by the U.S. Government in 2008, and a notice was sent out nationwide, seeking a new caretaker. In 2010, after completing a lengthy application process, the Michigan Lighthouse Conservancy (MLC) was awarded possession of both the Muskegon South Pierhead Light (1903) and the Muskegon South Breakwater Light (1930) through the National Historic Lighthouse Preservation Act. With the help of local volunteers, the Muskegon South Pierhead Light began limited public openings in 2013, and by 2015, regularly scheduled public tours were offered.

Restoration, preservation and public accessibility efforts are ongoing at both the Muskegon South Pierhead Light and Muskegon South Breakwater Light, in addition to the Alpena Lighthouse.

== Description ==
The Muskegon South Pierhead Light is a round cast iron tower located at the end of the southern pier. The entire lighthouse is painted red.

== See also ==
Muskegon Breakwater Light
