= North Manitou Shoal Light Station =

Lighthouse in Michigan, United States

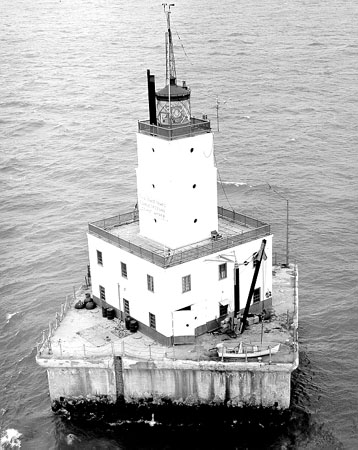
- Location: Southeast of North Manitou Island in Leland Township, Michigan
- Coordinates: 45°1′12″N 85°57′24″W

Tower
- Constructed: 1935
- Foundation: Concrete crib
- Construction: Steel
- Automated: 1980
- Height: 63 feet (19 m)
- Shape: Square on square house
- Markings: White
- Heritage: National Register of Historic Places listed place
- Racon: N

Light
- First lit: 1935
- Focal height: 79 feet (24 m)
- Lens: Westinghouse Airway Beacon (original), DCB-24 (current)
- Range: 12 nmi (22 km; 14 mi)
- Characteristic: Fl R 15s
- North Manitou Shoal Light Station
- U.S. National Register of Historic Places
- Nearest city: Leland Township, Michigan
- Area: less than one acre
- Built by: U.S. Lighthouse Service
- MPS: Light Stations of the United States MPS
- NRHP reference No.: 05000981
- Added to NRHP: September 6, 2005

The North Manitou Shoal Light, also known as the North Manitou Light or, locally, The Crib, is a lighthouse located in Lake Michigan, southeast of North Manitou Island in Leland Township, Michigan. When it was automated in 1980, it was the last manned offshore light in the Great Lakes. It was listed on the National Register of Historic Places in 2005.

== History ==
In 1907, the Lighthouse Board recommended that the shoal north of North Manitou Island be marked with a lightship. In 1910, Lightship No. 56 was stationed at the site, and continued there until 1927, when it was replaced by Lightship No. 89. In 1934, Lightship No. 103 was transferred to the location, and stayed until the permanent structure was built the next year.

In 1923, the Lighthouse Board first proposed replacing the lightships with a permanent station. However, funds were not allocated for the purpose until 1933, when they were made available through the Public Works Administration. In 1935, the permanent steel light station was constructed on the shoal in 26 feet (7.9 m) of water. The station was originally manned by a three-man crew, but in 1980 the light was automated and the station abandoned. The original Westinghouse Airway Beacon light was changed and replaced several times over the years, and is currently a solar and battery powered LED beacon.

in late 2016, the lighthouse was put up for public auction by the General Services Administration. The non-profit North Manitou Light Keepers, Inc. purchased the lighthouse at auction and have undertaken a total restoration of the lighthouse.

== Description ==
The North Manitou Shoal Light Station is a white square steel structure atop a concrete crib. The crib measures 65 feet (20 m) on a side, and supports a 62 feet (19 m) square superstructure rising 20 feet (6.1 m) above the water. A two-story steel building 37 feet (11 m) square, containing diesel generators and living quarters, sits atop the superstructure, and a three-story steel tower containing the light caps the whole. The steel portion is 63 feet (19 m) tall and the light is positioned 79 feet (24 m) above the water.
