= SS Edmund Fitzgerald =

Great Lakes freighter sunk in Lake Superior

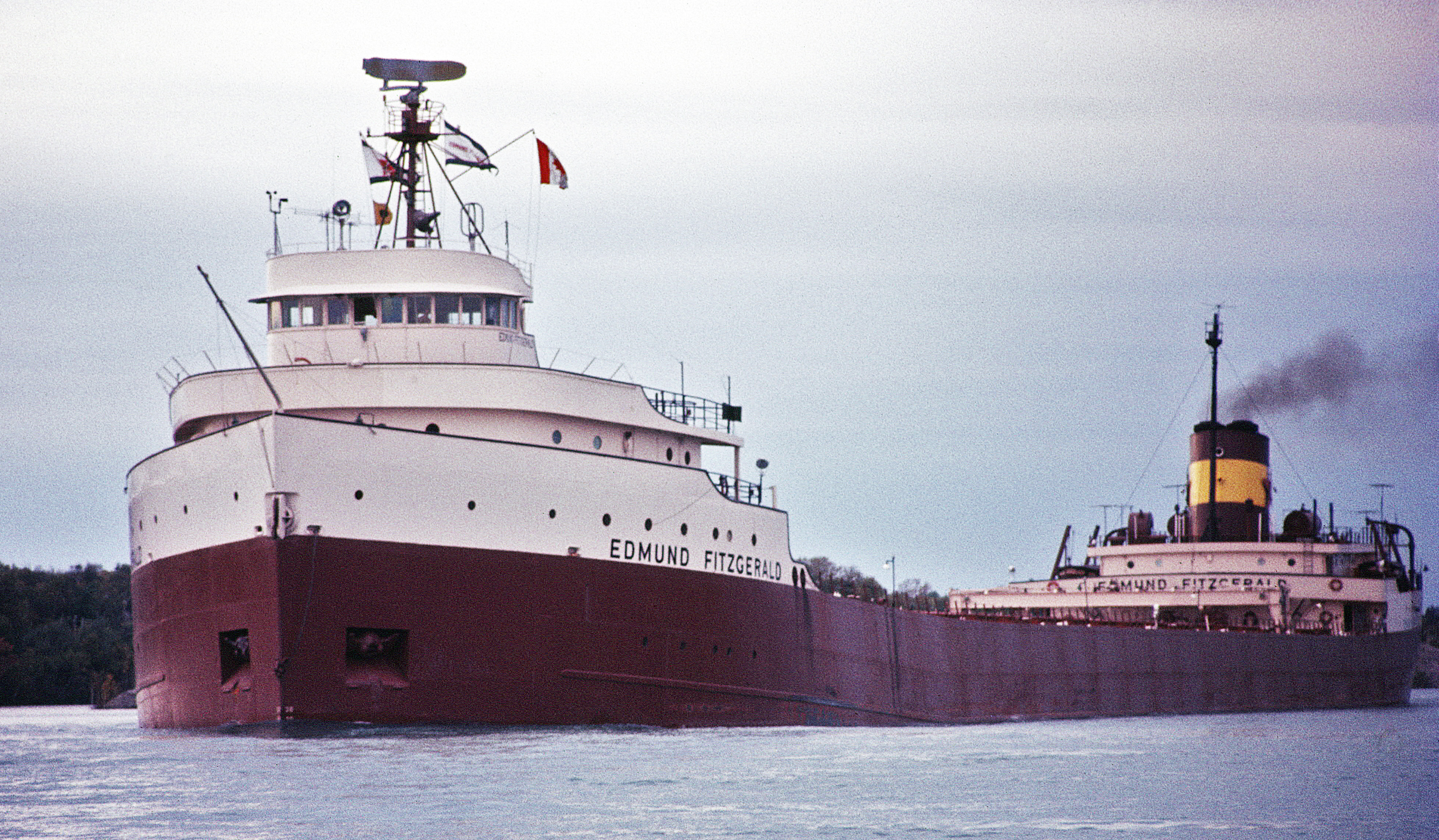
- SS Edmund Fitzgerald in 1971
- Location of Edmund Fitzgerald wreck

History

United States
- Name: SS Edmund Fitzgerald
- Namesake: Named for Edmund Fitzgerald, chairman of Northwestern Mutual
- Owner: Northwestern Mutual Life Insurance Company
- Operator: Columbia Transportation Division, Oglebay Norton Company of Cleveland, Ohio
- Port of registry: Milwaukee, Wisconsin
- Ordered: February 1, 1957
- Builder: Great Lakes Engineering Works of River Rouge, Michigan
- Yard number: 301
- Laid down: August 7, 1957
- Launched: June 7, 1958
- Maiden voyage: September 24, 1958
- In service: September 24, 1958
- Out of service: November 10, 1975
- Identification: Registry number US 277437
- Nickname(s): Fitz, Mighty Fitz, Big Fitz, Pride of the American Side, Toledo Express, Titanic of the Great Lakes
- Fate: Lost with all hands (29 crew) in a storm, November 10, 1975
- Notes: Location of wreck: 46°59′54″N 85°06′36″W

General characteristics
- Type: Lake freighter
- Tonnage: 13,632 GRT; 8,713 NRT (from 1969: 8,686 NRT); 25,500 DWT
- Length: 729 ft (222 m) overall; 711 ft (217 m) between perpendiculars
- Beam: 75 ft (23 m)
- Draft: 25 ft (7.6 m) typical
- Depth: 39 ft (12 m) (moulded)
- Depth of hold: 33 ft 4 in (10.16 m)
- Installed power: As built: Coal fired Westinghouse Electric Corporation steam turbine at 7,500 shp (5,600 kW); After refit: Conversion to oil fuel and the fitting of automated boiler controls over the winter of 1971–72.; Carried 72,000 U.S. gal (270,000 L; 60,000 imp gal) fuel oil
- Propulsion: Single fixed pitch 19.5 ft (5.9 m) propeller
- Speed: 14 kn (26 km/h; 16 mph)
- Crew: 29

SS Edmund Fitzgerald was an American Great Lakes freighter that sank in Lake Superior during a storm on November 10, 1975, with the loss of the entire crew of 29 men. When launched on June 7, 1958, she was the largest ship on North America's Great Lakes and remains the largest to have sunk there. Her wreck was located in deep water on November 14, 1975, by a U.S. Navy aircraft detecting magnetic anomalies, and soon afterwards found to be in two large pieces.

For 17 years, Edmund Fitzgerald carried taconite (a variety of iron ore) from mines along the Minnesota Iron Range near Duluth, Minnesota, to iron works in Detroit, Michigan; Toledo, Ohio; and other Great Lakes ports. As a workhorse, she set seasonal haul records six times, often breaking her own record. Captain Peter Pulcer was known for playing music day or night over the ship's intercom while passing through the St. Clair and Detroit rivers (between Lake Huron and Lake Erie), and entertaining spectators at the Soo Locks (between Lakes Superior and Huron) with a running commentary about the ship. Her size, record-breaking performance, and "DJ captain" endeared Edmund Fitzgerald to boat watchers.

On the afternoon of November 9, 1975, she embarked on her final voyage from Superior, Wisconsin, near Duluth, carrying a full cargo of taconite ore pellets with Master Captain Ernest M. McSorley in command. En route to a steel mill near Detroit, she was caught the next day in a severe storm with near-hurricane-force winds and waves up to 35 feet (11 m) high. Sometime after 5:30 p.m., Edmund Fitzgerald reported being in difficulty; at 7:10 p.m., Captain McSorley sent his last message, "We are holding our own". Shortly after 7:10 p.m., Edmund Fitzgerald suddenly sank in Canadian (Ontario) waters 530 feet (88 fathoms; 160 m) deep, about 17 miles (15 nautical miles; 27 kilometers) from Whitefish Bay near the twin cities of Sault Ste. Marie, Michigan, and Sault Ste. Marie, Ontario—a distance Edmund Fitzgerald could have covered in just over an hour at top speed. Her crew of 29 perished, and no bodies were recovered. The exact cause of the sinking remains unknown, though many books, studies, and expeditions have examined it. Edmund Fitzgerald may have been swamped, suffered structural failure or topside damage, grounded on a shoal, or suffered from a combination of these.

The disaster is one of the best-known in the history of Great Lakes shipping, in part through Canadian singer Gordon Lightfoot's popular 1976 ballad "The Wreck of the Edmund Fitzgerald". Lightfoot wrote the song after reading an article, "The Cruelest Month", in the November 24, 1975, issue of Newsweek. The sinking led to changes in Great Lakes shipping regulations and practices, including mandatory survival suits, depth finders, positioning systems, increased freeboard, and more frequent inspection of vessels.

== History ==
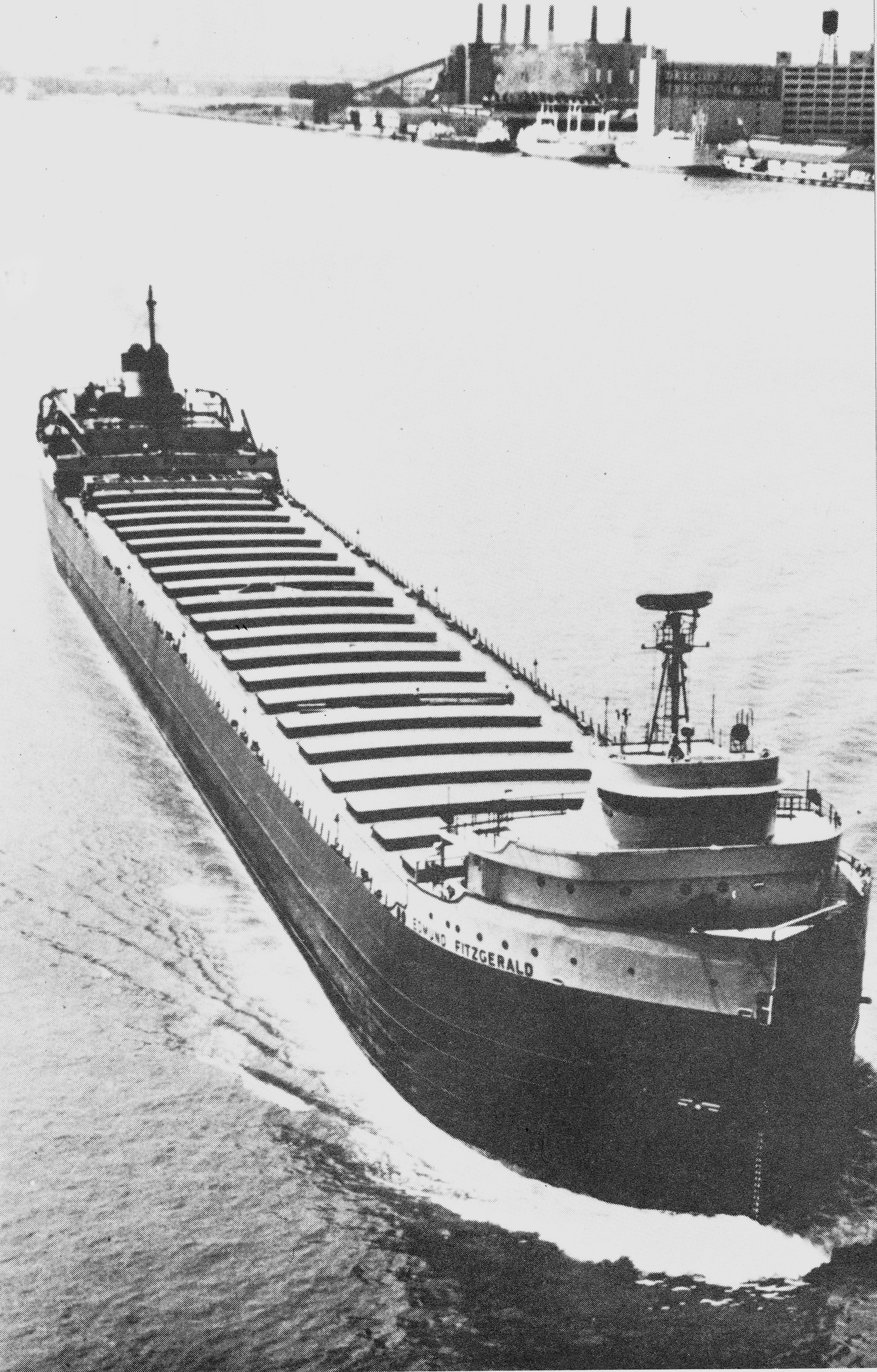
SS Edmund Fitzgerald in ballast, heading for the taconite mines

=== Design and construction ===
Northwestern Mutual Life Insurance Company of Milwaukee, Wisconsin, invested in the iron and minerals industries on a large scale, including the construction of Edmund Fitzgerald, which represented the first such investment by any American life insurance company. In 1957, they contracted Great Lakes Engineering Works (GLEW), of River Rouge, Michigan, to design and construct the ship "within a foot of the maximum length allowed for passage through the soon-to-be completed Saint Lawrence Seaway." The ship's value at that time was $7 million (equivalent to $61.3 million in 2025). Edmund Fitzgerald was the first laker built to the maximum St. Lawrence Seaway size, which was 730 feet (222.5 m) long, 75 feet (22.9 m) wide, and with a 25-foot (7.6 m) draft. The moulded depth (roughly speaking, the vertical height of the hull) was 39 ft (12 m). The hold depth (the inside height of the cargo hold) was 33 ft 4 in (10.16 m). GLEW laid the first keel plate on August 7 the same year.

With a deadweight capacity of 26,000 long tons (29,120 short tons; 26,417 t), and a 729-foot (222 m) hull, Edmund Fitzgerald was the longest ship on the Great Lakes, earning her the title Queen of the Lakes until September 17, 1959, when the 730-foot (222.5 m) SS Murray Bay was launched. Edmund Fitzgerald's three central cargo holds were loaded through 21 watertight cargo hatches, each 11 by 48 feet (3.4 by 14.6 m) of 5/16-inch-thick (7.9 mm) steel. In 1969, the ship's maneuverability was improved by the installation of a diesel-powered bow thruster. Originally coal-fired, her boilers were converted to burn oil during the 1971–72 winter layup.

By ore freighter standards, the interior of Edmund Fitzgerald was luxurious. Her J. L. Hudson Company–designed furnishings included deep pile carpeting, tiled bathrooms, drapes over the portholes, and leather swivel chairs in the guest lounge. There were two guest staterooms for passengers. Air conditioning extended to the crew quarters, which featured more amenities than usual. A large galley and fully stocked pantry supplied meals for two dining rooms. Edmund Fitzgerald's pilothouse was outfitted with "state-of-the-art nautical equipment and a beautiful map room."

=== Name and launch ===
Flag of the SS Edmund Fitzgerald

Northwestern Mutual wanted to name the ship after its president and chairman of the board, Edmund Fitzgerald (father of Edmund B. Fitzgerald). Fitzgerald's own grandfather and all great uncles had themselves been lake captains, and his father owned the Milwaukee Drydock Company, which built and repaired ships. Fitzgerald had attempted to dissuade the naming of the ship after himself, proposing the names Centennial, Seaway, Milwaukee and Northwestern. The board was resolute, and Edmund abstained from voting; the 36 board members voted unanimously to name her the SS Edmund Fitzgerald. More than 15,000 people attended Edmund Fitzgerald's christening and launch ceremony on June 7, 1958. The event was plagued by misfortunes. When Elizabeth Fitzgerald, wife of Edmund Fitzgerald, tried to christen the ship by smashing a champagne bottle over the bow, it took her three attempts to break it. Another attendee, Jennings B. Frazier of Toledo, suffered a heart attack and died. A delay of 36 minutes followed while the shipyard crew struggled to release the keel blocks. Upon sideways launch, the ship created a large wave, dousing the spectators, then crashed into a pier before righting herself. Other witnesses later said they swore the ship was "trying to climb right out of the water". On September 22, 1958, Edmund Fitzgerald completed nine days of sea trials.

=== Career ===
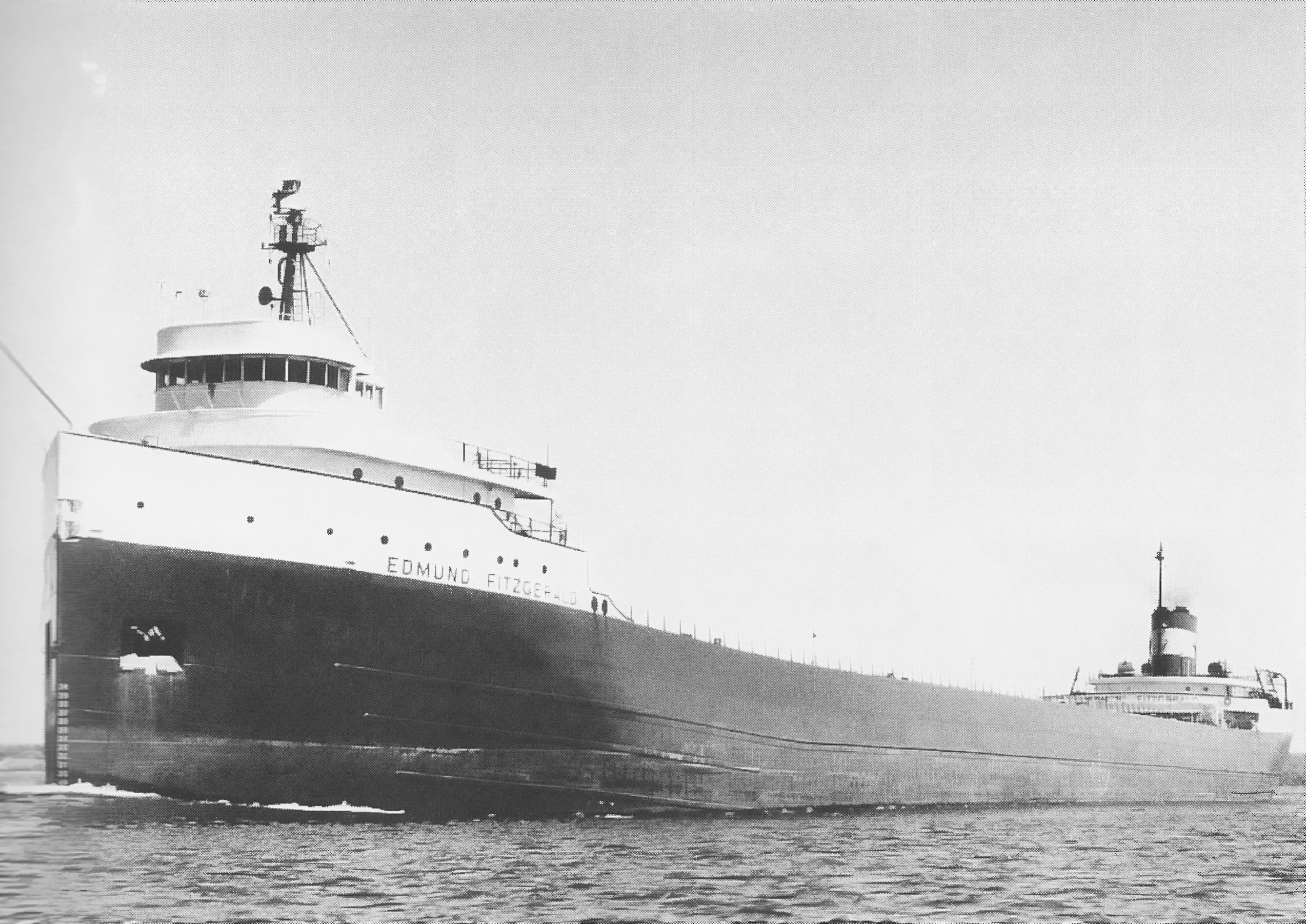
SS Edmund Fitzgerald under way

Northwestern Mutual's normal practice was to purchase ships to be operated by other companies. In Edmund Fitzgerald's case, they signed a 25-year contract with Oglebay Norton Corporation to operate the vessel. Oglebay Norton immediately designated Edmund Fitzgerald the flagship of its Columbia Transportation fleet.

Edmund Fitzgerald was a record-setting workhorse, often beating her own milestones. The vessel's record load for a single trip was 27,402 long tons (30,690 short tons; 27,842 t) in 1969. For 17 years, Edmund Fitzgerald carried taconite from Minnesota's Iron Range mines near Duluth, Minnesota, to iron works in Detroit, Toledo, and other ports. She set seasonal haul records six different times. Her nicknames included "Fitz", "Pride of the American Flag", "Mighty Fitz", "Toledo Express", "Big Fitz", and the "Titanic of the Great Lakes". Loading Edmund Fitzgerald with taconite pellets took about four and a half hours, while unloading took around 14 hours. A round trip between Superior, Wisconsin, and Detroit, Michigan, usually took her five days and she averaged 47 similar trips per season. The vessel's usual route was between Superior, Wisconsin, and Toledo, Ohio, although her port of destination could vary. By November 1975, Edmund Fitzgerald had logged an estimated 748 round trips on the Great Lakes and covered more than a million miles, "a distance roughly equivalent to 44 trips around the world."

Up until a few weeks before her loss, passengers had traveled on board as company guests. Frederick Stonehouse wrote:

Stewards treated the guests to the entire VIP routine. The cuisine was reportedly excellent and snacks were always available in the lounge. A small but well-stocked kitchenette provided the drinks. Once each trip, the captain held a candlelight dinner for the guests, complete with mess-jacketed stewards and special "clamdigger" punch.

Because of her size, appearance, string of records, and "DJ captain", Edmund Fitzgerald became a favorite of boat watchers throughout her career. Although Captain Peter Pulcer was in command of Edmund Fitzgerald on trips when cargo records were set, "he is best remembered ... for piping music day or night over the ship's intercom system" while passing through the St. Clair and Detroit Rivers. While navigating the Soo Locks he would often come out of the pilothouse and use a bullhorn to entertain tourists with a commentary on details about Edmund Fitzgerald.

In 1969, Edmund Fitzgerald received a safety award for eight years of operation without a time-off worker injury. The vessel ran aground in 1969, and she collided with SS Hochelaga in 1970. Later that same year, she struck the wall of a lock, an accident repeated in 1973 and 1974. On January 7, 1974, she lost her original bow anchor in the Detroit River. None of these mishaps were considered serious or unusual. Freshwater ships are built to last more than half a century, and Edmund Fitzgerald would have still had a long career ahead of her when she sank.

== Final voyage and wreck ==
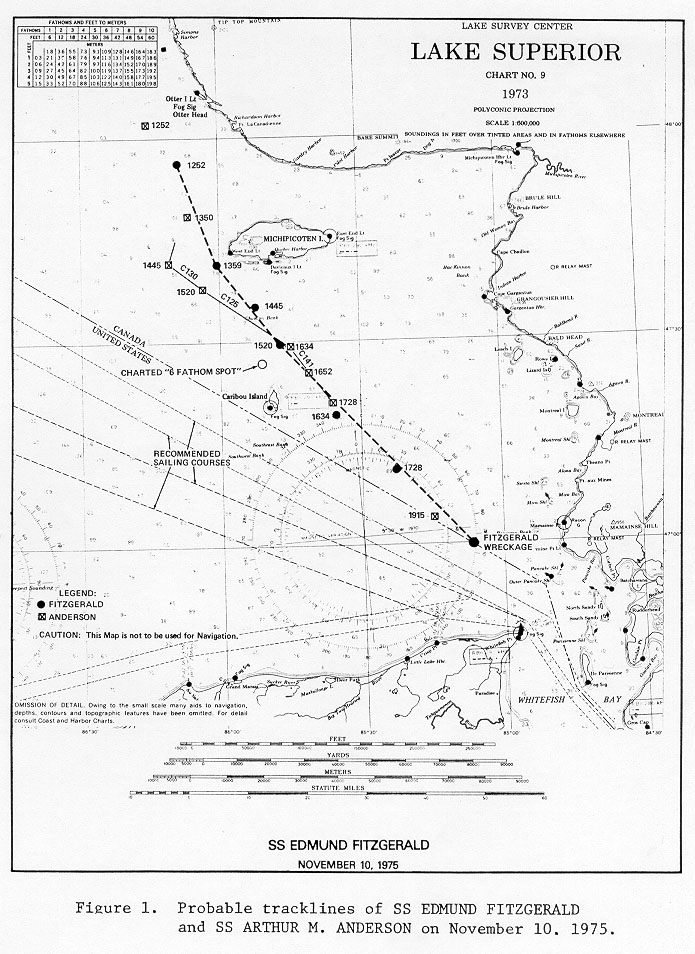
The National Transportation Safety Board map of probable course of Edmund Fitzgerald and Arthur M. Anderson

Wreck location

Ernest M. McSorley (September 29, 1912 – November 10, 1975) was the last captain of the SS Edmund Fitzgerald, perishing along with the other 28 members of his crew on November 10, 1975. Edmund Fitzgerald left Superior, Wisconsin, at 2:15 p.m. on November 9, 1975, under the command of Master Captain McSorley. She was en route to the steel mill on Zug Island, near Detroit with a cargo of 26,116 long tons (29,250 short tons; 26,535 t) of taconite ore pellets and soon reached her full speed of 16.3 miles per hour (14.2 kn; 26.2 km/h). Around 5 p.m., Edmund Fitzgerald joined a second freighter under the command of Captain Jesse B. "Bernie" Cooper, Arthur M. Anderson, destined for Gary, Indiana, out of Two Harbors, Minnesota. The weather forecast was not unusual for November and the National Weather Service (NWS) predicted that a storm would pass just south of Lake Superior by 7 a.m. on November 10.

SS Wilfred Sykes loaded opposite Edmund Fitzgerald at the Burlington Northern Dock #1 and departed at 4:15 p.m., about two hours after Edmund Fitzgerald. In contrast to the NWS forecast, Captain Dudley J. Paquette of Wilfred Sykes predicted that a major storm would directly cross Lake Superior. From the outset, he chose a route that took advantage of the protection offered by the lake's north shore to avoid the worst effects of the storm. The crew of Wilfred Sykes followed the radio conversations between Edmund Fitzgerald and Arthur M. Anderson during the first part of their trip and overheard their captains deciding to take the regular Lake Carriers' Association downbound route. The NWS altered its forecast at 7:00 p.m., issuing gale warnings for the whole of Lake Superior. Arthur M. Anderson and Edmund Fitzgerald altered course northward, seeking shelter along the Ontario shore, where they encountered a winter storm at 1:00 a.m. on November 10. Edmund Fitzgerald reported winds of 52 knots (96 km/h; 60 mph) and waves 10 feet (3.0 m) high. Captain Paquette of Wilfred Sykes reported that after 1 a.m., he overheard McSorley say that he had reduced the ship's speed because of the rough conditions. Paquette said he was stunned to later hear McSorley, who was not known for turning aside or slowing down, state that "we're going to try for some lee from Isle Royale. You're walking away from us anyway ... I can't stay with you."

At 2:00 a.m. on November 10, the NWS upgraded its warnings from gale to storm, forecasting winds of 35–50 knots (65–93 km/h; 40–58 mph). Until then, Edmund Fitzgerald had followed Arthur M. Anderson, which was travelling at a constant 14.6 miles per hour (12.7 kn; 23.5 km/h), but the faster Edmund Fitzgerald pulled ahead at about 3:00 a.m. As the storm center passed over the ships, they experienced shifting winds, with wind speeds temporarily dropping as wind direction changed from northeast to south and then northwest. After 1:50 p.m., when Arthur M. Anderson logged winds of 50 knots (93 km/h; 58 mph), wind speeds again picked up rapidly, and it began to snow at 2:45 p.m., reducing visibility; Arthur M. Anderson lost sight of Edmund Fitzgerald, which was about 16 miles (26 km) ahead at the time.

Shortly after 3:30 p.m., Captain McSorley radioed Arthur M. Anderson to report that Edmund Fitzgerald was taking on water and had lost two vent covers and a fence railing. The vessel had also developed a starboard list. Two of Edmund Fitzgerald's six bilge pumps ran continuously to discharge shipped water. McSorley said that he would slow his ship down so that Arthur M. Anderson could close the gap between them. In a broadcast shortly afterward, the United States Coast Guard (USCG) warned all shipping that the Soo Locks had been closed and they should seek safe anchorage. Shortly after 4:10 p.m., McSorley called Arthur M. Anderson again to report a radar failure and asked Arthur M. Anderson to keep track of them. Edmund Fitzgerald, effectively blind, slowed to let Arthur M. Anderson come within a 10-mile (16 km) range so she could receive radar guidance from the other ship.

For a time, Arthur M. Anderson directed Edmund Fitzgerald toward the relative safety of Whitefish Bay; then, at 4:39 p.m., McSorley contacted the USCG station in Grand Marais, Michigan, to inquire whether the Whitefish Point light and navigation beacon were operational. The USCG replied that their monitoring equipment indicated that both instruments were inactive. McSorley then hailed any ships in the Whitefish Point area to report the state of the navigational aids, receiving an answer from Captain Cedric Woodard of Avafors between 5:00 and 5:30 p.m. that the Whitefish Point light was on but not the radio beacon. Woodard testified to the Marine Board that he overheard McSorley say, "Don't allow nobody on deck," as well as something about a vent that Woodard could not understand. Some time later, McSorley told Woodard, "I have a 'bad list', I have lost both radars, and am taking heavy seas over the deck in one of the worst seas I have ever been in."

By late in the afternoon of November 10, sustained winds of over 50 knots (93 km/h; 58 mph) were recorded by ships and observation points across eastern Lake Superior. Arthur M. Anderson logged sustained winds as high as 58 knots (107 km/h; 67 mph) at 4:52 p.m., while waves increased to as high as 25 feet (7.6 m) by 6:00 p.m. Arthur M. Anderson was also struck by 70-to-75-knot (130 to 139 km/h; 81 to 86 mph) gusts and rogue waves as high as 35 feet (11 m).

At approximately 7:10 p.m., when Arthur M. Anderson notified Edmund Fitzgerald of an upbound ship and asked how she was doing, McSorley reported, "We are holding our own." She was never heard from again. No distress signal was received, and ten minutes later, Arthur M. Anderson lost the ability either to reach Edmund Fitzgerald by radio or to detect her on radar.

=== Search ===
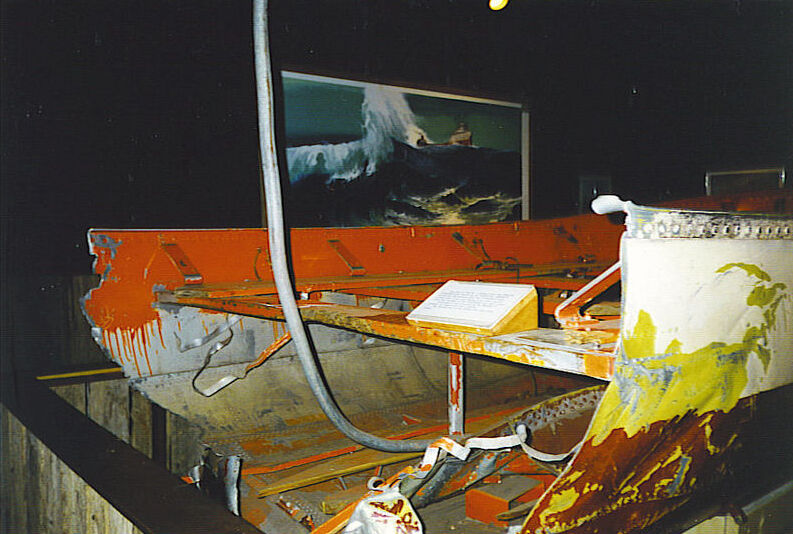
One of Edmund Fitzgerald's lifeboats, on display at the Valley Camp museum ship

Captain Cooper of Arthur M. Anderson first called the USCG in Sault Ste. Marie at 7:39 p.m. on channel 16, the radio distress frequency. The USCG responders instructed him to call back on channel 12 because they wanted to keep their emergency channel open and they were having difficulty with their communication systems, including antennas blown down by the storm. Cooper then contacted the upbound saltwater vessel Nanfri and was told that she could not pick up Edmund Fitzgerald on her radar either. Despite repeated attempts to raise the USCG, Cooper was not successful until 7:54 p.m. when the officer on duty asked him to keep watch for a 16-foot (4.9 m) boat lost in the area. At about 8:25 p.m., Cooper again called the USCG to express his concern about Edmund Fitzgerald and at 9:03 p.m. reported her missing. Petty Officer Philip Branch later testified, "I considered it serious, but at the time it was not urgent."

Lacking appropriate search-and-rescue vessels to respond to Edmund Fitzgerald's disaster, at approximately 9:00 p.m., the USCG asked Arthur M. Anderson to turn around and look for survivors. Around 10:30 p.m., the USCG asked all commercial vessels anchored in or near Whitefish Bay to assist in the search. The initial search for survivors was carried out by Arthur M. Anderson, and a second freighter, SS William Clay Ford. The efforts of a third freighter, the Toronto-registered SS Hilda Marjanne, were foiled by the weather. The USCG sent a buoy tender, Woodrush, from Duluth, Minnesota, but it took two and a half hours to launch and a day to travel to the search area. The Traverse City, Michigan, USCG station launched an HU-16 fixed-wing search aircraft that arrived on the scene at 10:53 p.m. while an HH-52 USCG helicopter with a 3.8-million-candlepower searchlight arrived at 1:00 a.m. on November 11. Canadian Coast Guard aircraft joined the three-day search and the Ontario Provincial Police established and maintained a beach patrol all along the eastern shore of Lake Superior.

Although the search recovered debris, including lifeboats and rafts, none of the crew were found. On her final voyage, Edmund Fitzgerald's crew of 29 consisted of the captain; the first, second, and third mates; five engineers; three oilers; a cook; a wiper; two maintenance men; three watchmen; three deckhands; three wheelsmen; two porters; a cadet; and a steward. Most of the crew were from Ohio and Wisconsin; their ages ranged from 20 (watchman Karl A. Peckol) to 63 (Captain Ernest M. McSorley).

Edmund Fitzgerald is among the largest and best-known vessels lost on the Great Lakes, but she is not alone on the bottom of Lake Superior in that area. In the years between 1816, when Invincible was lost, and 1975, when Edmund Fitzgerald sank, the Whitefish Point area had claimed at least 240 ships.

== Wreck discovery and surveys ==
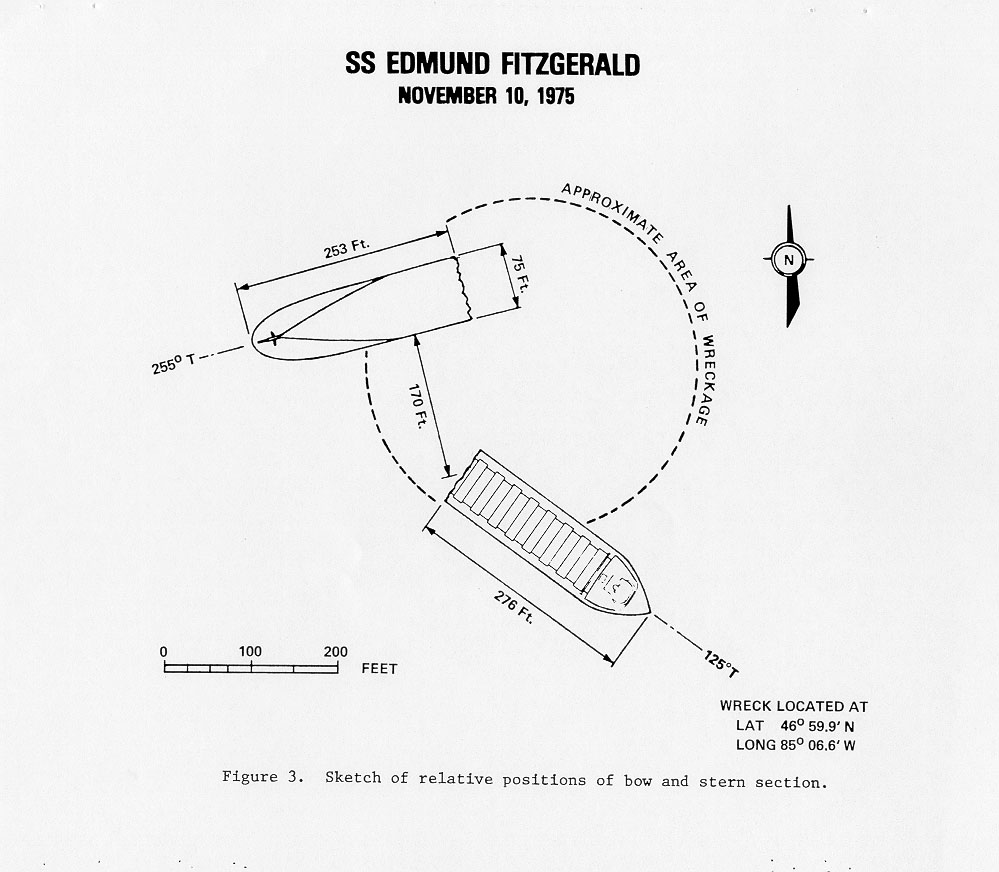
A USCG drawing of the relative positions of the wreck parts

=== Wreck discovery ===
A U.S. Navy Lockheed P-3 Orion aircraft, piloted by Lt. George Conner, found the wreck using its magnetic anomaly detector on November 14, 1975, in Canadian waters close to the international boundary at a depth of 530 feet (160 m). Edmund Fitzgerald lies about 15 miles (13 nmi; 24 km) west of Deadman's Cove, Ontario; about 8 miles (7.0 nmi; 13 km) northwest of Pancake Bay Provincial Park; and 17 miles (15 nmi; 27 km) from the entrance to Whitefish Bay to the southeast. A further November 14–16 survey by the USCG using a side scan sonar revealed two large objects lying close together on the lake floor. The U.S. Navy also contracted Seaward, Inc., to conduct a second survey between November 22 and 25.

=== Underwater surveys ===
From May 20 to 28, 1976, the U.S. Navy dived on the wreck using its unmanned submersible, CURV-III, and found Edmund Fitzgerald lying in two large pieces in 530 feet (160 m) of water. Navy estimates put the length of the bow section at 276 feet (84 m) and that of the stern section at 253 feet (77 m). The bow section stood upright in the mud, some 170 feet (52 m) from the stern section that lay capsized at a 50-degree angle from the bow. In between the two broken sections lay a large mass of taconite pellets and scattered wreckage, including hatch covers and hull plating.

In 1980, during a Lake Superior research dive expedition, marine explorer Jean-Michel Cousteau sent two divers from RV Calypso in the first manned submersible dive to Edmund Fitzgerald. The dive was brief, and although the dive team drew no final conclusions, they speculated that Edmund Fitzgerald had broken up on the surface.

The Michigan Sea Grant Program organized a three-day dive to survey Edmund Fitzgerald in 1989. The primary objective was to record 3D video footage for use in museum educational programs and the production of documentaries. The expedition used a towed survey system (TSS Mk1) and a self-propelled, tethered, free-swimming remotely operated underwater vehicle (ROV). The Mini Rover ROV was equipped with miniature stereoscopic cameras and wide-angle lenses in order to produce 3D images. The towed survey system and the Mini Rover ROV were designed, built and operated by Chris Nicholson of Deep Sea Systems International, Inc. Participants included the National Oceanic and Atmospheric Administration (NOAA), the National Geographic Society, the United States Army Corps of Engineers, the Great Lakes Shipwreck Historical Society (GLSHS), and the United States Fish and Wildlife Service, the latter providing RV Grayling as the support vessel for the ROV. The GLSHS used part of the five hours of video footage produced during the dives in a documentary and the National Geographic Society used a segment in a broadcast. Frederick Stonehouse, who wrote one of the first books on the Edmund Fitzgerald wreck, moderated a 1990 panel review of the video that drew no conclusions about the cause of Edmund Fitzgerald's sinking.

Canadian explorer Joseph B. MacInnis organized and led six publicly funded dives to Edmund Fitzgerald over a three-day period in 1994. Harbor Branch Oceanographic Institution provided Edwin A. Link as the support vessel, and their manned submersible, Celia. The GLSHS paid $10,000 for three of its members to each join a dive and take still pictures. MacInnis concluded that the notes and video obtained during the dives did not provide an explanation why Edmund Fitzgerald sank. The same year, longtime sport diver Fred Shannon formed Deepquest Ltd., and organized a privately funded dive to the wreck of Edmund Fitzgerald, using Delta Oceanographic's submersible, Delta. Deepquest Ltd. conducted seven dives and took more than 42 hours of underwater video while Shannon set the record for the longest submersible dive to Edmund Fitzgerald at 211 minutes. Prior to conducting the dives, Shannon studied NOAA navigational charts and found that the international boundary had changed three times before its publication by NOAA in 1976. Shannon determined that based on GPS coordinates from the 1994 Deepquest expedition, "at least one-third of the two acres of immediate wreckage containing the two major portions of the vessel is in U.S. waters because of an error in the position of the U.S.–Canada boundary line shown on official lake charts."

Shannon's group discovered the remains of a crew member partly dressed in coveralls and wearing a life jacket alongside the bow of the ship, indicating that at least one of the crew was aware of the possibility of sinking. The life jacket had deteriorated canvas and "what is thought to be six rectangular cork blocks ... clearly visible." Shannon concluded that "massive and advancing structural failure" caused Edmund Fitzgerald to break apart on the surface and sink.

MacInnis led another series of dives in 1995 to salvage the bell from Edmund Fitzgerald. The Sault Tribe of Chippewa Indians backed the expedition by co-signing a loan in the amount of $250,000. Canadian engineer Phil Nuytten's atmospheric diving suit, known as the Newtsuit, was used to retrieve the bell from the ship, replace it with a replica, and put a beer can in Edmund Fitzgerald's pilothouse. That same year, Terrence Tysall and Mike Zee set multiple records when they used trimix gas to scuba dive to Edmund Fitzgerald. The pair are the only people known to have touched the Edmund Fitzgerald wreck. They also set records for the deepest scuba dive on the Great Lakes and the deepest shipwreck dive, and were the first divers to reach Edmund Fitzgerald without the aid of a submersible. It took six minutes to reach the wreck, six minutes to survey it, and three hours to resurface to avoid decompression sickness (bends).

=== Restrictions on surveys ===
Under the Ontario Heritage Act, activities on registered archeological sites require a license. In March 2005, the Whitefish Point Preservation Society accused the Great Lakes Shipwreck Historical Society (GLSHS) of conducting an unauthorized dive to Edmund Fitzgerald. Although the director of the GLSHS admitted to conducting a sonar scan of the wreck in 2002, he denied such a survey required a license at the time it was carried out.

An April 2005 amendment to the Ontario Heritage Act allows the Ontario government to impose a license requirement on dives, the operation of submersibles, side scan sonars, or underwater cameras within a designated radius around protected sites. Conducting any of those activities without a license would result in fines of up to CA$1 million. On the basis of the amended law, to protect wreck sites considered "watery graves", the Ontario government issued updated regulations in January 2006, including an area with a 500-meter (1,640 ft) radius around Edmund Fitzgerald and other specifically designated marine archeological sites. In 2009, a further amendment to the Ontario Heritage Act imposed licensing requirements on any type of surveying device.

== Hypotheses on the cause of sinking ==
Extreme weather and inland sea conditions play a role in all of the published hypotheses regarding Edmund Fitzgerald's sinking, but they differ on the other causal factors.

=== Waves and weather hypothesis ===
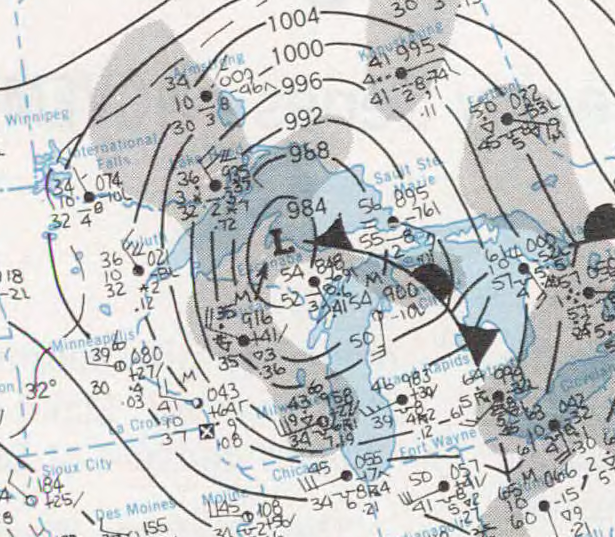
Weather map of November 10, 1975

In 2005, NOAA and the NWS ran a computer simulation, including weather and wave conditions, covering the period from November 9, 1975, until the early morning of November 11. Analysis of the simulation showed that two separate areas of high-speed wind appeared over Lake Superior at 4:00 p.m. on November 10. One had speeds in excess of 43 knots (80 km/h; 49 mph) and the other winds in excess of 40 knots (74 km/h; 46 mph). The southeastern part of the lake, the direction in which Edmund Fitzgerald was heading, had the highest winds. Average wave heights increased to near 19 feet (5.8 m) by 7:00 p.m., November 10, and winds exceeded 50 mph (43 kn; 80 km/h) over most of southeastern Lake Superior.

Edmund Fitzgerald sank at the eastern edge of the area of high wind where the long fetch, or distance that wind blows over water, produced significant waves averaging over 23 feet (7.0 m) by 7:00 p.m. and over 25 feet (7.6 m) at 8:00 p.m. The simulation also showed one in 100 waves reaching 36 feet (11 m) and one out of every 1,000 reaching 46 feet (14 m). Since the ship was heading east-southeastward, it is likely that the waves caused Edmund Fitzgerald to roll heavily.

At the time of the sinking, the ship Arthur M. Anderson reported northwest winds of 57 mph (50 kn; 92 km/h), matching the simulation analysis result of 54 mph (47 kn; 87 km/h). The analysis further showed that the maximum sustained winds reached near hurricane force of about 70 mph (61 kn; 110 km/h) with gusts to 86 miles per hour (75 kn; 138 km/h) at the time and location where Edmund Fitzgerald sank.

=== Rogue wave hypothesis ===
A group of three rogue waves, often called "three sisters," was reported in the vicinity of Edmund Fitzgerald at the time she sank. The "three sisters" phenomenon is said to occur on Lake Superior and refers to a sequence of three rogue waves forming that are one-third larger than normal waves. The first wave introduces an abnormally large amount of water onto the deck. This water is unable to fully drain away before the second wave strikes, adding to the surplus. The third incoming wave again adds to the two accumulated backwashes, quickly overloading the deck with too much water.

Captain Cooper of Arthur M. Anderson reported that his ship was "hit by two 30 to 35 foot seas about 6:30 p.m., one burying the aft cabins and damaging a lifeboat by pushing it right down onto the saddle. The second wave of this size, perhaps 35 foot, came over the bridge deck." Cooper went on to say that these two waves, possibly followed by a third, continued in the direction of Edmund Fitzgerald and would have struck about the time she sank. This hypothesis postulates that the "three sisters" compounded the twin problems of Edmund Fitzgerald's known list and her lower speed in heavy seas that already allowed water to remain on her deck for longer than usual.

The "Edmund Fitzgerald" episode of the 2010 television series Dive Detectives features the wave-generating tank of the National Research Council's Institute for Naval Technology in St. John's, and the tank's simulation of the effect of a 17-meter (56 ft) rogue wave upon a scale model of Edmund Fitzgerald. The simulation indicated such a rogue wave could almost completely submerge the bow or stern of the ship with water, at least temporarily.

=== Cargo-hold flooding hypothesis ===
The July 26, 1977, USCG Marine Casualty Report suggested that the accident was caused by ineffective hatch closures. The report concluded that these devices failed to prevent waves from inundating the cargo hold. The flooding occurred gradually and probably imperceptibly throughout the final day, finally resulting in a fatal loss of buoyancy and stability. As a result, Edmund Fitzgerald plummeted to the bottom without warning. Video footage of the wreck site showed that most of her hatch clamps were in perfect condition. The USCG Marine board concluded that the few damaged clamps were probably the only ones fastened. As a result, ineffective hatch closure caused Edmund Fitzgerald to flood and founder.

From the beginning of the USCG inquiry, some of the crewmen's families and various labor organizations believed the USCG findings could be tainted because there were serious questions regarding their preparedness as well as licensing and rules changes. Paul Trimble, a retired USCG vice admiral and president of the Lake Carriers Association (LCA), wrote a letter to the National Transportation Safety Board (NTSB) on September 16, 1977, that included the following statements of objection to the USCG findings:

The present hatch covers are an advanced design and are considered by the entire lake shipping industry to be the most significant improvement over the telescoping leaf covers previously used for many years ... The one-piece hatch covers have proven completely satisfactory in all weather conditions without a single vessel loss in almost 40 years of use ... and no water accumulation in cargo holds ...

It was common practice for ore freighters, even in foul weather, to embark with not all cargo clamps locked in place on the hatch covers. Maritime author Wolff reported that, depending on weather conditions, all the clamps were eventually set within one to two days. Captain Paquette of Wilfred Sykes was dismissive of suggestions that unlocked hatch clamps caused Edmund Fitzgerald to founder. He said that he commonly sailed in fine weather using the minimum number of clamps necessary to secure the hatch covers.

The May 4, 1978, NTSB findings differed from the USCG, concluding that Edmund Fitzgerald sank suddenly from flooding of the cargo hold "due to the collapse of one or more of the hatch covers under the weight of giant boarding seas" instead of flooding gradually due to ineffective hatch closures. The NTSB conducted computer studies, testing and analysis to determine the forces necessary to collapse the hatch covers, and made the following observations based on the CURV-III dive survey:

The No. 1 hatch cover was entirely inside the No. 1 hatch and showed indications of buckling from external loading. Sections of the coaming in way of the No. 1 hatch were fractured and buckled inward. The No. 2 hatch cover was missing and the coaming on the No. 2 hatch was fractured and buckled. Hatches Nos. 3 and 4 were covered with mud; one corner of hatch cover No. 3 could be seen in place. Hatch cover No. 5 was missing. A series of 16 consecutive hatch cover clamps were observed on the No. 5 hatch coaming. Of this series, the first and eighth were distorted or broken. All of the 14 other clamps were undamaged and in the open position. The No. 6 hatch was open and a hatch cover was standing on end vertically in the hatch. The hatch covers were missing from hatches Nos. 7 and 8 and both coamings were fractured and severely distorted. The bow section abruptly ended just aft of hatch No. 8 and the deck plating was ripped up from the separation to the forward end of hatch No. 7.

=== Shoaling hypothesis ===
The LCA believed that instead of hatch cover leakage, the more probable cause of Edmund Fitzgerald's loss was shoaling or grounding in the Six Fathom Shoal northwest of Caribou Island when the vessel "unknowingly raked a reef" during the time the Whitefish Point light and radio beacon were not available as navigation aids. (A dissenting NTSB opinion also supported this hypothesis.) The hypothesis was supported by a 1976 Canadian hydrographic survey, which disclosed that an unknown shoal ran a mile farther east of Six Fathom Shoal than shown on the Canadian charts. Officers from Arthur M. Anderson observed that Edmund Fitzgerald sailed through this exact area. Conjecture by proponents of the Six Fathom Shoal hypothesis concluded that Edmund Fitzgerald's downed fence rail reported by McSorley could occur only if the ship "hogged" during shoaling, with the bow and stern bent downward and the midsection raised by the shoal, pulling the railing tight until the cables dislodged or tore under the strain. Divers searched the Six Fathom Shoal after the wreck occurred and found no evidence of "a recent collision or grounding anywhere."

Maritime authors Bishop and Stonehouse wrote that the shoaling hypothesis was later challenged on the basis of the higher quality of detail in Shannon's 1994 photography that "explicitly show[s] the devastation of the Edmund Fitzgerald". Shannon's photography of Edmund Fitzgerald's overturned stern showed "no evidence on the bottom of the stern, the propeller or the rudder of the ship that would indicate the ship struck a shoal."

Maritime author Stonehouse reasoned that "unlike the Lake Carriers, the Coast Guard had no vested interest in the outcome of their investigation." Author Bishop reported that Captain Paquette of Wilfred Sykes argued that through their support for the shoaling explanation, the LCA represented the shipping company's interests by advocating a hypothesis that held blameless the LCA member companies, the American Bureau of Shipping, and the U.S. Coast Guard Service.

Paul Hainault, a retired professor of mechanical engineering from Michigan Technological University, promoted a hypothesis that began as a student class project. His hypothesis held that Edmund Fitzgerald grounded at 9:30 a.m. on November 10 on Superior Shoal. This shoal, charted in 1929, is an underwater mountain in the middle of Lake Superior about 50 miles (80 km) north of Copper Harbor, Michigan. It has sharp peaks that rise nearly to the lake surface with water depths ranging from 22 to 400 feet (6.7 to 121.9 m), making it a menace to navigation. Discovery of the shoal resulted in a change in recommended shipping routes. A seiche, or standing wave, that occurred during the low-pressure system over Lake Superior on November 10, 1975, caused the lake to rise 3 feet (0.91 m) over the Soo Locks's gates to flood Portage Avenue in Sault Ste. Marie, Michigan, with 1 foot (0.3 m) of water. Hainault's hypothesis held that this seiche contributed to Edmund Fitzgerald shoaling 200 feet (61 m) of her hull on Superior Shoal, causing the hull to be punctured mid-body. The hypothesis contended that the wave action continued to damage the hull, until the middle third dropped out like a box, leaving the ship held together by the center deck. The stern section acted as an anchor and caused Edmund Fitzgerald to come to a full stop, causing everything to go forward. The ship broke apart on the surface within seconds. Compressed air pressure blew a hole in the starboard bow, which sank 18 degrees off course. The rear kept going forward with the engine still running, rolled to port and landed bottom up.

=== Structural failure hypothesis ===
Another published hypothesis contends that an already weakened structure, and modification of Edmund Fitzgerald's winter load line (which allows heavier loading and travel lower in the water), made it possible for large waves to cause a stress fracture in the hull. This is based on the "regular" huge waves of the storm and does not necessarily involve rogue waves.

The USCG and NTSB investigated whether Edmund Fitzgerald broke apart due to structural failure of the hull and because the 1976 CURV III survey found Edmund Fitzgerald's sections were 170 feet (52 m) from each other, the USCG's formal casualty report of July 1977 concluded that she had separated upon hitting the lake floor. The NTSB came to the same conclusion as USCG because:

The proximity of the bow and stern sections on the bottom of Lake Superior indicated that the vessel sank in one piece and broke apart either when it hit bottom or as it descended. Therefore, Edmund Fitzgerald did not sustain a massive structural failure of the hull while on the surface ... The final position of the wreckage indicated that if the Edmund Fitzgerald had capsized, it must have suffered a structural failure before hitting the lake bottom. The bow section would have had to right itself and the stern portion would have had to capsize before coming to rest on the bottom. It is, therefore, concluded that the Edmund Fitzgerald did not capsize on the surface.

Other authors have concluded that Edmund Fitzgerald most likely broke in two on the surface before sinking due to the intense waves, like the ore carriers SS Carl D. Bradley in 1958 and SS Daniel J. Morrell in 1966. After maritime historian Frederick Stonehouse moderated the panel reviewing the video footage from the 1989 ROV survey of Edmund Fitzgerald, he concluded that the extent of taconite coverage over the wreck site showed that the stern had floated on the surface for a short time and spilled taconite into the forward section; thus the two sections of the wreck did not sink at the same time. The 1994 Shannon team found that the stern and the bow were 255 feet (78 m) apart, leading Shannon to conclude that Edmund Fitzgerald broke up on the surface. He said:

This placement does not support the hypothesis that the ship plunged to the bottom in one piece, breaking apart when it struck bottom. If this were true, the two sections would be much closer. In addition, the angle, repose and mounding of clay and mud at the site indicate the stern rolled over on the surface, spilling taconite ore pellets from its severed cargo hold, and then landed on portions of the cargo itself.

The stress fracture hypothesis was supported by the testimony of former crewmen. Former Second Mate Richard Orgel, who served on Edmund Fitzgerald in 1972 and 1973, testified that "the ship had a tendency to bend and spring during storms 'like a diving board after somebody has jumped off.'" Orgel was quoted as saying that the loss of Edmund Fitzgerald was caused by hull failure, "pure and simple. I detected undue stress in the side tunnels by examining the white enamel paint, which will crack and splinter when submitted to severe stress." George H. "Red" Burgner, Edmund Fitzgerald's steward for ten seasons and winter ship-keeper for seven years, testified in a deposition that a "loose keel" contributed to the vessel's loss. Burgner further testified that "the keel and sister kelsons were only 'tack welded'" and that he had personally observed that many of the welds were broken. Burgner was not asked to testify before the Marine Board of Inquiry.

When Bethlehem Steel Corporation permanently laid up Edmund Fitzgerald's sister ship, SS Arthur B. Homer, just five years after going to considerable expense to lengthen her, questions were raised as to whether both ships had the same structural problems. The two vessels were built in the same shipyard using welded joints instead of the riveted joints used in older ore freighters. Riveted joints allow a ship to flex and work in heavy seas, while welded joints are more likely to break. Reports indicate that repairs to Edmund Fitzgerald's hull were delayed in 1975 due to plans to lengthen the ship during the upcoming winter layup. Arthur B. Homer was lengthened to 825 feet (251 m) and placed back in service by December 1975, not long after Edmund Fitzgerald foundered. In 1978, without explanation, Bethlehem Steel Corporation denied permission for the chairman of the NTSB to travel on Arthur B. Homer. Arthur B. Homer was permanently laid up in 1980 and broken for scrap in 1987.

Retired GLEW naval architect Raymond Ramsay, one of the members of the design team that worked on the hull of Edmund Fitzgerald, reviewed her increased load lines, maintenance history, along with the history of long ship hull failure and concluded that Edmund Fitzgerald was not seaworthy on November 10, 1975. He stated that planning Edmund Fitzgerald to be compatible with the constraints of the St. Lawrence Seaway had placed her hull design in a "straight jacket [sic?]." Edmund Fitzgerald's long-ship design was developed without the benefit of research, development, test, and evaluation principles while computerized analytical technology was not available at the time she was built. Ramsay noted that Edmund Fitzgerald's hull was built with an all-welded (instead of riveted) modular fabrication method, which was used for the first time in the GLEW shipyard. Ramsay concluded that increasing the hull length to 729 feet (222 m) resulted in an L/D slenderness ratio (the ratio of the length of the ship to the depth of her structure) that caused excessive multi-axial bending and springing of the hull, and that the hull should have been structurally reinforced to cope with her increased length.

=== Topside damage hypothesis ===
The USCG said topside damage was a reasonable alternative reason that Edmund Fitzgerald sank, and surmised that damage to the fence rail and vents might have been caused by a log or other heavy floating object. Mark Thompson, a merchant seaman and author of numerous books on Great Lakes shipping, believes that something broke loose from the ship's deck. He theorized that the loss of the vents led to the flooding of two ballast tanks or a ballast tank and a walking tunnel that caused the ship to list. Thompson further conjectured that damage more extensive than Captain McSorley could detect in the pilothouse let water flood the cargo hold. He concluded that the topside damage experienced at 3:30 p.m., compounded by the heavy seas, was the most obvious explanation for why she sank.

== Possible contributing factors ==
The USCG, NTSB, and proponents of alternative theories have all named multiple possible contributing factors to the foundering of Edmund Fitzgerald.

=== Weather forecasting ===
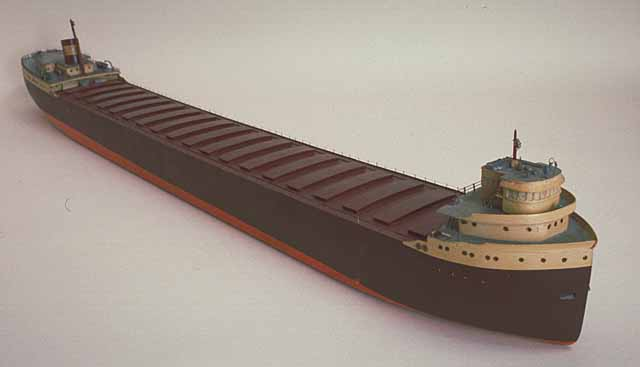
A scale model of SS Edmund Fitzgerald

The NWS long-range forecast on November 9 predicted that a storm would pass just south of Lake Superior and over the Keweenaw Peninsula, extending into the lake from Michigan's Upper Peninsula. Captain Paquette of Wilfred Sykes had been following and charting the low-pressure system over Oklahoma since November 8 and concluded that a major storm would track across eastern Lake Superior. He therefore chose a route that gave Wilfred Sykes the most protection and took refuge in Thunder Bay, Ontario, during the worst of the storm. Based on the NWS forecast, Arthur M. Anderson and Edmund Fitzgerald instead started their trip across Lake Superior after the regular Lake Carriers Association route, which placed them in the path of the storm. The NTSB investigation concluded that the NWS failed to accurately predict wave heights on November 10. After running computer models in 2005 using actual meteorological data from November 10, 1975, Hultquist of the NWS said of Edmund Fitzgerald's position in the storm, "It ended in precisely the wrong place at the absolute worst time."

=== Inaccurate navigational charts ===
After reviewing testimony that Edmund Fitzgerald had passed near shoals north of Caribou Island, the USCG Marine Board examined the relevant navigational charts. They found that the Canadian 1973 navigational chart for the Six Fathom Shoal area was based on Canadian surveys from 1916 and 1919 and that the 1973 U.S. Lake Survey Chart No. 9 included the notation, "Canadian Areas. For data concerning Canadian areas, Canadian authorities have been consulted." Thereafter, at the request of the Marine Board and the Commander of the USCG Ninth District, the Canadian Hydrographic Service conducted a survey of the area surrounding Michipicoten Island and Caribou Island in 1976. The survey revealed that the shoal ran about 1 mile (1.6 km) farther east than shown on Canadian charts. The NTSB investigation concluded that, at the time of Edmund Fitzgerald's foundering, Lake Survey Chart No. 9 was not detailed enough to indicate Six Fathom Shoal as a hazard to navigation.

=== Lack of watertight bulkheads ===
Thompson stated that if her cargo holds had had watertight subdivisions, "the Edmund Fitzgerald could have made it into Whitefish Bay." Frederick Stonehouse also held that the lack of watertight bulkheads caused Edmund Fitzgerald to sink. He said:

The Great Lakes ore carrier is the most commercially efficient vessel in the shipping trade today. But it's nothing but a motorized barge! It's the unsafest commercial vessel afloat. It has virtually no watertight integrity. Theoretically, a one-inch puncture in the cargo hold will sink it.

Stonehouse called on ship designers and builders to design lake carriers more like ships rather than "motorized super-barges", making the following comparison:

Contrast this [the Edmund Fitzgerald] with the story of the SS Maumee, an oceangoing tanker that struck an iceberg near the South Pole recently. The collision tore a hole in the ship's bow large enough to drive a truck through, but the Maumee was able to travel halfway around the world to a repair yard, without difficulty, because she was fitted with watertight bulkheads.

After Edmund Fitzgerald foundered, Great Lakes shipping companies were accused of valuing cargo payloads more than human life, since the vessel's cargo hold of 860,950 cubic feet (24,379 m^{3}) had been divided by two non-watertight traverse "screen" bulkheads. The NTSB Edmund Fitzgerald investigation concluded that Great Lakes freighters should be constructed with watertight bulkheads in their cargo holds.

The USCG had proposed rules for watertight bulkheads in Great Lakes vessels as early as the sinking of Daniel J. Morrell in 1966 and did so again after the sinking of Edmund Fitzgerald, arguing that this would allow ships to make it to refuge or at least allow crew members to abandon ship in an orderly fashion. The LCA represented the Great Lakes fleet owners and was able to forestall watertight subdivision regulations by arguing that this would cause economic hardship for vessel operators. A few vessel operators have built Great Lakes ships with watertight subdivisions in the cargo holds since 1975, but most vessels operating on the lakes cannot prevent flooding of the entire cargo hold area.

=== Lack of instrumentation ===
A fathometer was not required under USCG regulations, and Edmund Fitzgerald lacked one, even though fathometers were available at the time of her sinking. Instead, a hand line was the only method Edmund Fitzgerald had to take depth soundings. The hand line consisted of a piece of line knotted at measured intervals with a lead weight on the end. The line was thrown over the bow of the ship and the count of the knots measured the water depth. The NTSB investigation concluded that a fathometer would have provided Edmund Fitzgerald additional navigational data and made her less dependent on Arthur M. Anderson for navigational assistance.

Edmund Fitzgerald had no system to monitor the presence or amount of water in her cargo hold, even though there was always some present. The intensity of the November 10 storm would have made it difficult, if not impossible, to access the hatches from the spar deck (deck over the cargo holds). The USCG Marine Board found that flooding of the hold could not have been assessed until the water reached the top of the taconite cargo. The NTSB investigation concluded that it would have been impossible to pump water from the hold when it was filled with bulk cargo. The Marine Board noted that because Edmund Fitzgerald lacked a draft-reading system, the crew had no way to determine whether the vessel had lost freeboard (the level of a ship's deck above the water).

=== Increased load lines, reduced freeboard ===
The USCG increased Edmund Fitzgerald's load line in 1969, 1971, and 1973 to allow 3 feet 3.25 inches (997 mm) less minimum freeboard than the ship's original design. This meant the ship's deck was only 11.5 feet (3.5 m) above the water when she faced 35-foot (11 m) waves during the November 10 storm. Captain Paquette of Wilfred Sykes noted that this change allowed Edmund Fitzgerald to carry 4,000 more tons than designed.

Concerns about Edmund Fitzgerald's keel-welding problem surfaced as the USCG started increasing her load line. This increase and the resultant reduction in freeboard decreased the vessel's critical reserve buoyancy. Edmund Fitzgerald, which had been described as a "good riding ship", became a sluggish vessel with slower response and recovery times. Her bow hooked to one side or the other in heavy seas without recovering and made a groaning sound not heard on other ships. Captain McSorley described the ship's action as a "wiggling thing" that scared him.

=== Maintenance ===
NTSB investigators noted that Edmund Fitzgerald's earlier groundings could have caused undetected damage that led to major structural failure during the storm, since Great Lakes vessels were normally drydocked for inspection only once every five years. It was also alleged that when compared to Edmund Fitzgerald's previous captain (Peter Pulcer), McSorley did not keep up with routine maintenance and did not confront the mates about getting the requisite work done. After August B. Herbel Jr., president of the American Society for Testing and Materials, examined photographs of the welds on Edmund Fitzgerald, he stated, "the hull was just being held together with patching plates." Other questions were raised as to why the USCG did not discover and take corrective action in its pre-November 1975 inspection of Edmund Fitzgerald, given that her hatch coamings, gaskets, and clamps were poorly maintained.

=== Complacency ===
On the fateful evening of November 10, 1975, McSorley reported he had never seen bigger seas in his life. Paquette, captain of Wilfred Sykes, out in the same storm, said, "I'll tell anyone that it was a monster sea washing solid water over the deck of every vessel out there." The USCG did not broadcast that all ships should seek safe anchorage until after 3:35 p.m. on November 10, many hours after the weather was upgraded from a gale to a storm.

McSorley was known as a "heavy weather captain" who, according to George Burgner, "'beat hell' out of the Fitzgerald and 'very seldom ever hauled up for weather'". Paquette held the opinion that negligence caused Edmund Fitzgerald to founder. He said, "in my opinion, all the subsequent events arose because (McSorley) kept pushing that ship and didn't have enough training in weather forecasting to use common sense and pick a route out of the worst of the wind and seas." Paquette's vessel was the first to reach a discharge port after the November 10 storm; she was met by company attorneys who came aboard Sykes. He told them that Edmund Fitzgerald's foundering was caused by negligence. Paquette was never asked to testify during the USCG or NTSB investigations.

The NTSB investigation noted that Great Lakes cargo vessels could normally avoid severe storms and called for the establishment of a limiting sea state applicable to Great Lakes bulk cargo vessels. This would restrict the operation of vessels in sea states above the limiting value. One concern was that shipping companies pressured the captains to deliver cargo as quickly and cheaply as possible regardless of bad weather. At the time of Edmund Fitzgerald's foundering, there was no evidence that any governmental regulatory agency tried to control vessel movement in foul weather despite the historical record that hundreds of Great Lakes vessels had been wrecked in storms. The USCG took the position that only the captain could decide when it was safe to sail.

The USCG Marine Board issued the following conclusion:

The nature of Great Lakes shipping, with short voyages, much of the time in very protected waters, frequently with the same routine from trip to trip, leads to complacency and an overly optimistic attitude concerning the extreme weather conditions that can and do exist. The Marine Board feels that this attitude reflects itself at times in deferral of maintenance and repairs, in failure to prepare properly for heavy weather, and in the conviction that since refuges are near, safety is possible by "running for it." While it is true that sailing conditions are good during the summer season, changes can occur abruptly, with severe storms and extreme weather and sea conditions arising rapidly. This tragic accident points out the need for all persons involved in Great Lakes shipping to foster increased awareness of the hazards which exist.

Mark Thompson countered that "the Coast Guard laid bare [its] own complacency" by blaming the sinking of Edmund Fitzgerald on industry-wide complacency since it had inspected Edmund Fitzgerald just two weeks before she sank. The loss of Edmund Fitzgerald also exposed the USCG's lack of rescue capability on Lake Superior. Thompson said that ongoing budget cuts had limited the USCG's ability to perform its historical functions. He further noted that USCG rescue vessels were unlikely to reach the scene of an incident on Lake Superior or Lake Huron within 6 to 12 hours of its occurrence.

== Legal settlement ==
Under maritime law, ships fall under the jurisdiction of the admiralty courts of their flag country. As Edmund Fitzgerald was sailing under the U.S. flag, even though she sank in foreign (Canadian) waters, she was subject to U.S. admiralty law. With a value of $24 million, Edmund Fitzgerald's financial loss was the greatest in Great Lakes sailing history. In addition to the crew, 26,116 long tons (29,250 short tons; 26,535 t) of taconite sank along with the vessel. Two widows of crewmen filed a $1.5 million lawsuit against Edmund Fitzgerald's owners, Northwestern Mutual, and its operators, Oglebay Norton Corporation, one week after she sank. An additional $2.1 million lawsuit was later filed. Oglebay Norton subsequently filed a petition in the U.S. District Court seeking to "limit their liability to $817,920 in connection with other suits filed by families of crew members". The company paid compensation to surviving families about 12 months in advance of official findings of the probable cause and on condition of imposed confidentiality agreements. Robert Hemming, a reporter and newspaper editor, reasoned in his book about Edmund Fitzgerald that the USCG's conclusions "were benign in placing blame on [n]either the company or the captain ... [and] saved the Oglebay Norton from very expensive lawsuits by the families of the lost crew."

== Subsequent changes to Great Lakes shipping practice ==
The USCG investigation of Edmund Fitzgerald's sinking resulted in 15 recommendations regarding load lines, weathertight integrity, search and rescue capability, lifesaving equipment, crew training, loading manuals, and providing information to masters of Great Lakes vessels. NTSB's investigation resulted in 19 recommendations for the USCG, four recommendations for the American Bureau of Shipping, and two recommendations for NOAA. Of the official recommendations, the following actions and USCG regulations were put in place:

1. In 1977, the USCG started requiring the use of depth finders by all vessels of 1,600 gross register tons and over.
2. Since 1980, survival suits have been required aboard ship in each crew member's quarters and at their customary work station with strobe lights affixed to life jackets and survival suits.
3. A LORAN-C positioning system for navigation on the Great Lakes was implemented in 1980 and later replaced with Global Positioning System (GPS) in the 1990s.
4. Emergency Position Indicating Radio Beacons (EPIRBs) are installed on all Great Lakes vessels for immediate and accurate location in event of a disaster.
5. Navigational charts for northeastern Lake Superior were improved for accuracy and greater detail.
6. NOAA revised its method for predicting wave heights.
7. The USCG rescinded the 1973 Load Line Regulation amendment that permitted reduced freeboard loadings.
8. The USCG began the annual pre-November inspection program recommended by the NTSB. "Coast Guard inspectors now board all U.S. ships during the fall to inspect hatch and vent closures and lifesaving equipment."

Karl Bohnak, an Upper Peninsula meteorologist, covered the sinking and storm in a book on local weather history. In this book, Joe Warren, a deckhand on Arthur M. Anderson during the November 10, 1975, storm, said that the storm changed the way things were done. He stated, "After that, trust me, when a gale came up we dropped the hook [anchor]. We dropped the hook because they found out the big ones could sink." Mark Thompson wrote, "Since the loss of the Fitz, some captains may be more prone to go to anchor, rather than venturing out in a severe storm, but there are still too many who like to portray themselves as 'heavy weather sailors.'"

== Memorials ==
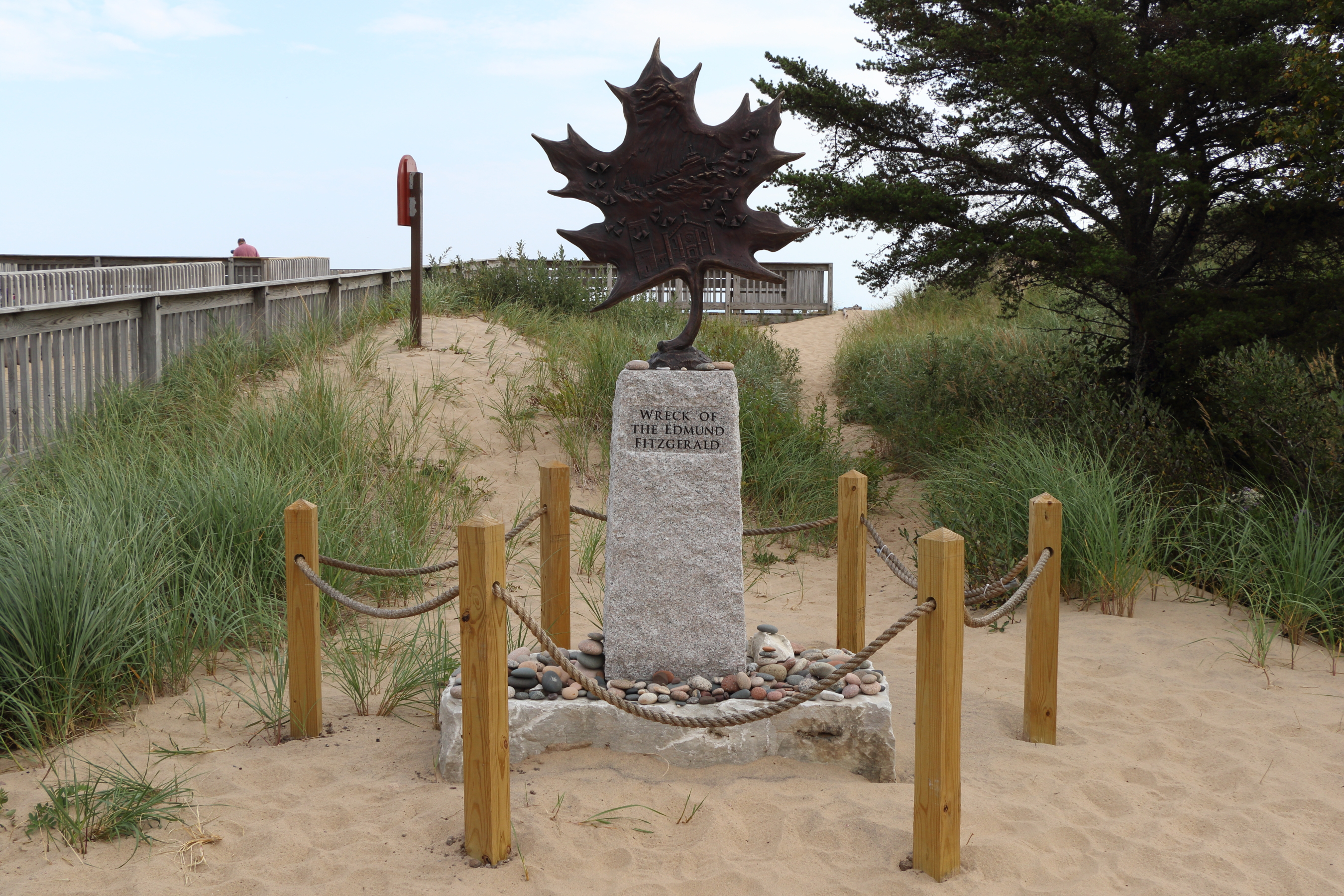
Edmund Fitzgerald Memorial at Whitefish Point

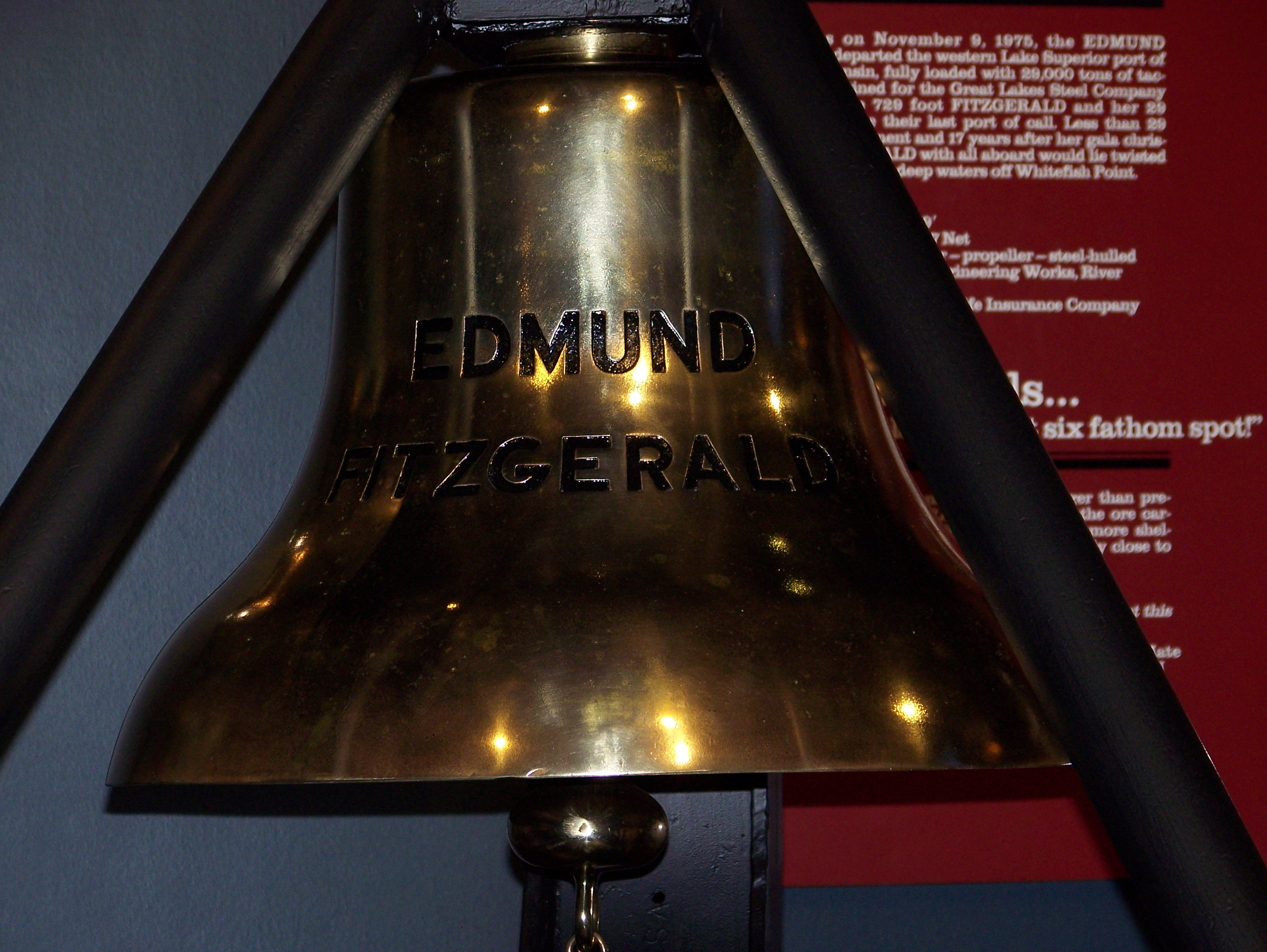
The bell from Edmund Fitzgerald on display at the Great Lakes Shipwreck Museum

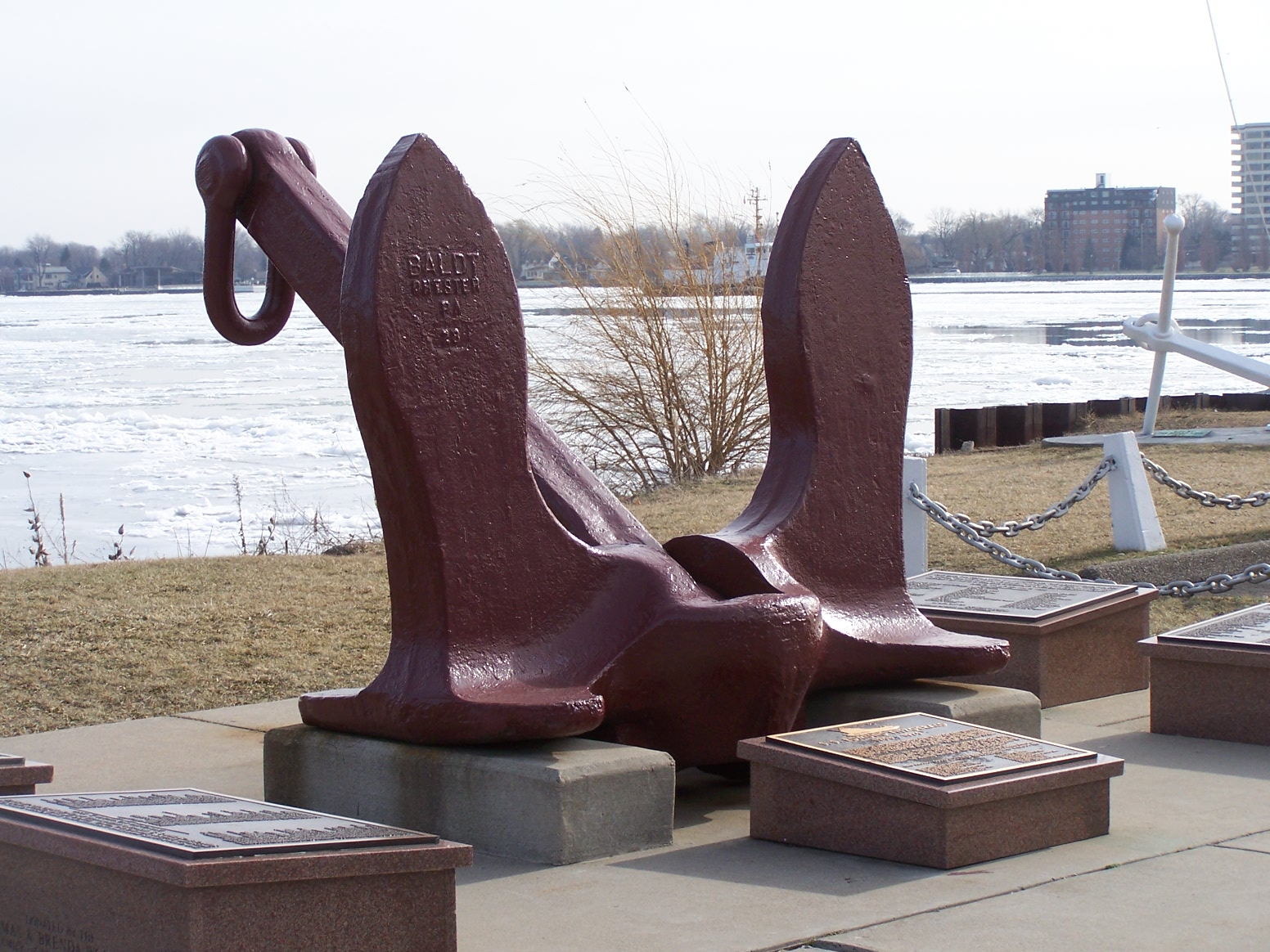
Edmund Fitzgerald bow anchor on display at the Dossin Great Lakes Museum

The day after the wreck, Mariners' Church in Detroit rang its bell 29 times, once for each life lost. The church continued to hold an annual memorial, reading the names of the crewmen and ringing the church bell, until 2006 when the church broadened its memorial ceremony to commemorate all lives lost on the Great Lakes. After the death of singer Gordon Lightfoot on May 1, 2023, the church bell was ceremonially rung 29 times in memory of the crew, plus an additional ring in memory of Lightfoot who committed their deaths to posterity.

The ship's bell was recovered from the wreck on July 4, 1995. A replica engraved with the names of the 29 sailors who died replaced the original on the wreck. A legal document signed by 46 relatives of the deceased, officials of the Mariners' Church of Detroit and the Great Lakes Shipwreck Historic Society (GLSHS) "donated the custodian and conservatorship" of the bell to the GLSHS "to be incorporated in a permanent memorial at Whitefish Point, Michigan, to honor the memory of the 29 men of the SS Edmund Fitzgerald." The terms of the legal agreement made the GLSHS responsible for maintaining the bell, and forbade it from selling or moving the bell or using it for commercial purposes. It provided for transferring the bell to the Mariners' Church of Detroit if the terms were violated.

An uproar occurred in 1995 when a maintenance worker in St. Ignace, Michigan, refurbished the bell by stripping the protective coating applied by Michigan State University experts. The controversy continued when the Great Lakes Shipwreck Museum tried to use the bell as a touring exhibit in 1996. Relatives of the crew halted this move, objecting that the bell was being used as a "traveling trophy". As of 2005, the bell is on display in the Great Lakes Shipwreck Museum in Whitefish Point near Paradise, Michigan.

An anchor from Edmund Fitzgerald lost on an earlier trip from 1974 was recovered from the Detroit River on July 20, 1992 and is on display at the Dossin Great Lakes Museum in Detroit, Michigan. The Dossin Great Lakes Museum also hosts a Lost Mariners Remembrance event each year on the evening of November 10. Artifacts on display in the Steamship Valley Camp museum in Sault Ste. Marie, include two lifeboats, photos, a movie of Edmund Fitzgerald and commemorative models and paintings. Every November 10, the Split Rock Lighthouse near Silver Bay, Minnesota, emits a light in honor of Edmund Fitzgerald.

On August 8, 2007, along a remote shore of Lake Superior on the Keweenaw Peninsula, a Michigan family discovered a lone life-saving ring that appeared to have come from Edmund Fitzgerald. It bore markings different from those of rings found at the wreck site, and was thought to be a hoax. Later it was determined that the life ring was not from Edmund Fitzgerald, but had been lost by the owner, whose father had made it as a personal memorial.

The Royal Canadian Mint commemorated Edmund Fitzgerald in 2015 with a colored silver collector coin, with a face value of $20.

From July 26 to August 28, 2025, the Edmund Fitzgerald Memorial Swim was held as part of commemorating the 50th anniversary of the sinking. Using a relay system, 68 swimmers symbolically completed the final journey of the Fitzgerald by delivering taconite pellets which originated in Superior, Wisconsin. The relay started at the resting place of the ship and continued 411 miles (661 km) to Detroit. The taconite was presented to the deputy mayor of Detroit at the Mariners' Church as part of memorial ceremonies to honor the Fitzgerald and her crew.

=== Musical and theater tributes ===
Ontario singer-songwriter Gordon Lightfoot wrote, composed, and recorded the song "The Wreck of the Edmund Fitzgerald" for his 1976 album Summertime Dream. On NPR's Weekend Edition Saturday on February 14, 2015, Gordon Lightfoot said he was inspired to write the song when he saw the name misspelled "Edmond" in Newsweek magazine two weeks after the sinking; Lightfoot said he felt that it dishonored the memory of the 29 who died. Lightfoot's popular ballad made the sinking of Edmund Fitzgerald one of the best-known disasters in the history of Great Lakes shipping. The original lyrics of the song show a degree of artistic license compared to the events of the actual sinking: it states the destination as Cleveland instead of Detroit. Also, in light of new evidence about what happened, Lightfoot modified one line for live performances, the original stanza being:

When suppertime came the old cook came on deck,
Saying "Fellas, it's too rough to feed ya."
At 7 p.m. a main hatchway caved in,
He said, "Fellas, it's been good to know ya."

Lightfoot changed the third line to "At 7 p.m. it grew dark, it was then", although possibly to "At 7 p.m. it grew dark, it was dim".

He also changed the word "musty" in the lines

In a musty old hall in Detroit they prayed
In the Maritime Sailors' Cathedral

to "rustic", as the building is not actually musty (it is also not a cathedral as it is not the seat of a bishop, and its name is actually Mariners' Church, but this line was never changed).

On May 2, 2023, at 3 p.m. the Mariners' Church of Detroit tolled its bell 30 times; 29 times in memory of the crew of the Fitzgerald, and a 30th time in memory of Lightfoot, who died at age 84, on May 1, 2023.

In 1986, writer Steven Dietz and songwriter/lyricist Eric Peltoniemi wrote the musical Ten November in memory of Edmund Fitzgerald's sinking. In 2005, the play was re-edited into a concert version called The Gales of November, which opened on the 30th anniversary of the sinking at the Fitzgerald Theater (Note: The Fitzgerald Theater is not named after the Edmund Fitzgerald, but rather, F. Scott Fitzgerald.) in St. Paul, Minnesota.

In November 2000, Shelley Russell opened a production of her play, Holdin' Our Own: The Wreck of the Edmund Fitzgerald, at the Forest Roberts Theatre on the campus of Northern Michigan University. The production featured a cast of 14, 11 set on board the Edmund Fitzgerald and three on the Arthur M. Anderson.

A piano concerto titled The Edmund Fitzgerald was composed by American composer Geoffrey Peterson in 2002; it was premiered by the Sault Symphony Orchestra in Sault Ste. Marie, Ontario, in November 2005 as another 30th-anniversary commemoration.

=== Commercialization ===
The fame of Edmund Fitzgerald's image and historical narrative have made it public domain and subject to commercialization. A "cottage industry" has evolved across the Great Lakes region from Two Harbors, Minnesota, to Whitefish Point, the incident's "ground zero". Memorabilia on sale include Christmas ornaments, T-shirts, coffee mugs, Edmund Fitzgerald Porter, videos, and other items commemorating the vessel and its loss.

== See also ==
- Graveyard of the Great Lakes – Area of Lake Superior with many shipwrecks
- List of maritime disasters
- List of shipwrecks in the Great Lakes
- List of storms on the Great Lakes
- MV Derbyshire – British bulk carrier lost in 1980 under similar circumstances
- SS El Faro – U.S. cargo ship lost in 2015 under similar circumstances
- SS Arthur B. Homer—The Fitzgerald's sister ship constructed in the same shipyard (GLEW), a former lake freighter in service from 1959 to 1980, and scrapped in 1987
