= SS Arthur B. Homer =

Great Lakes freighter built in 1960

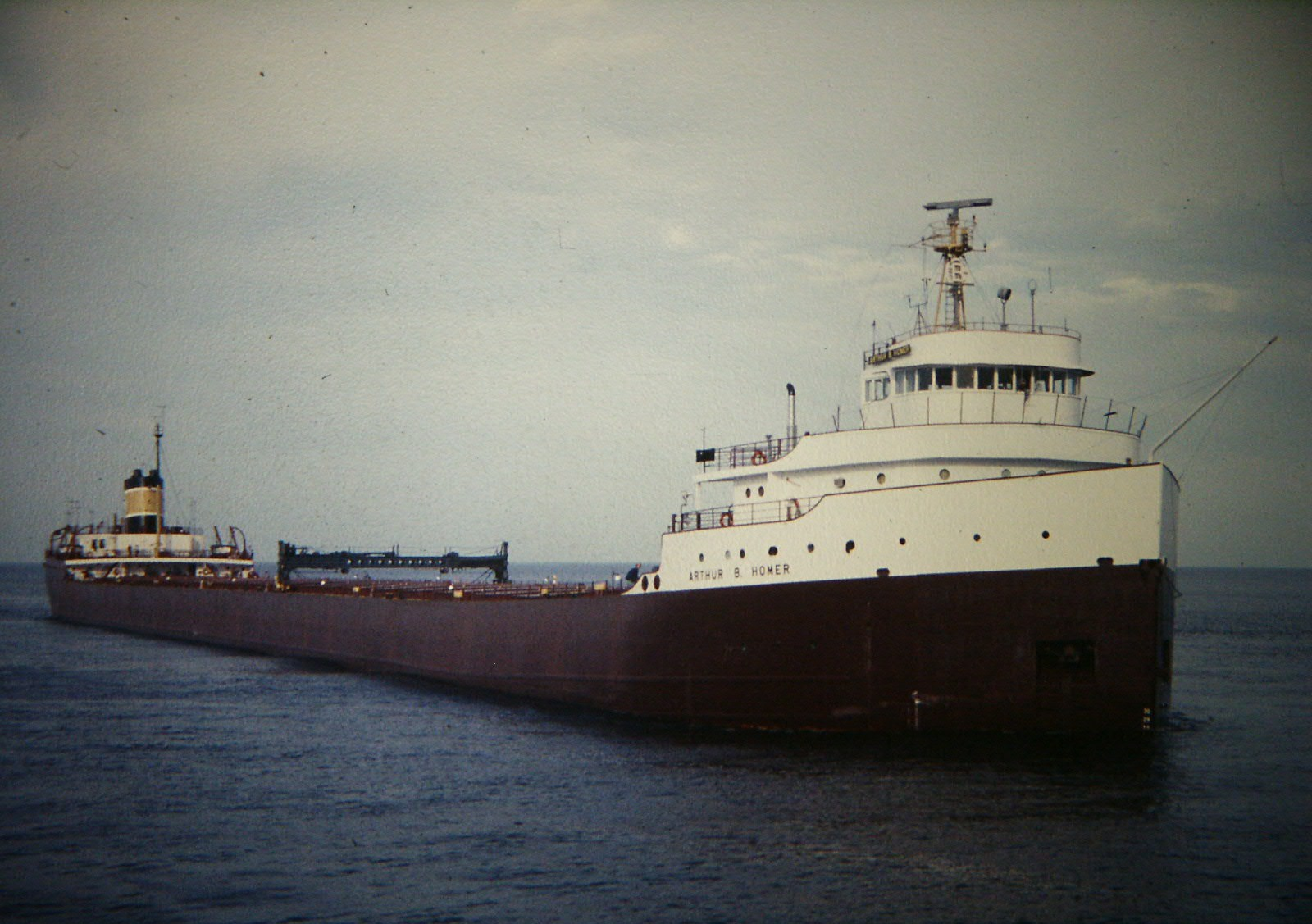
- SS Arthur B. Homer in 1978

History

United States
- Name: Arthur B. Homer
- Owner: Bethlehem Steel Corporation
- Operator: Bethlehem Transportation Corporation
- Port of registry: Wilmington, Delaware
- Builder: Great Lakes Engineering Works
- Launched: November 7, 1959
- Out of service: October 4, 1980
- Identification: U.S. Registry #280946; IMO number: 5025627
- Fate: Scrapped 1987

General characteristics as built
- Class & type: Lake freighter
- Tonnage: 13,390 GRT; 8,442 NRT
- Length: 730 ft (220 m)
- Beam: 75 ft (23 m)
- Depth: 39 ft (12 m)
- Installed power: Steam turbine

SS Arthur B. Homer was a 730-foot (220 m) lake freighter that was built in 1960 by Great Lakes Engineering Works in River Rouge, Michigan for the Bethlehem Steel Corporation. The ship, launched on November 7, 1959, was the largest vessel ever side-launched at that time. The vessel was laid up in 1980 and never saw service again before being scrapped in 1987.

== Description ==
Arthur B. Homer was a bulk carrier and lake freighter assessed at 13,390 gross register tons (GRT) and 8,442 net register tons (NRT) when built. The ship initially measured 730 feet (220 m) long overall and 711.2 feet (216.8 m) between perpendiculars with a beam of 75.1 feet (22.9 m), a depth of 39 feet (12 m) and a draft of 33.4 feet (10.2 m). (Note: The Historical Collections of the Great Lakes has the tonnage as 1,339 GRT, but that is in error for a vessel this size.) The ship had an arch hold construction with 24-foot (7.3 m) hatches. The ship was powered by oil-fired boilers that fed steam to a turbine turning one propeller creating 8,000 shaft horsepower (6,000 kW). It had an initial capacity of more than 25,000 long tons (25,000 t). In 1975, the vessel underwent significant changes, being lengthened to 807.2 feet (246.0 m) and reassessed at 15,200 GRT and 10,225 NRT. After expansion, the ship could carry over 31,000 long tons (31,000 t).

== Construction and career ==
The vessel was constructed for the Bethlehem Steel Corporation and its keel was laid down on March 18, 1959, by Great Lakes Engineering Works at their shipyard in River Rouge, Michigan. It was the twelfth vessel of the Bethlehem Steel fleet and the largest vessel side-launched in the world when it was launched on November 7, 1959. The ship was named for a president of Bethlehem Steel, it became the largest lake freighter in U.S. registry at launch. The ship entered service on April 20, 1960, and became Bethlehem Steel's flagship. Arthur B. Homer was the last ship constructed by Great Lakes Engineering Works. The ship was able to operate anywhere in the Great Lakes and the St. Lawrence Seaway, but mainly sailed between Bethlehem's plant at Lackawanna and the ports of Cleveland and Ashtabula, Ohio servicing their plant at Johnstown, Pennsylvania. On October 5, 1972, Arthur B. Homer was southbound in the Livingston Channel of the Detroit River heading to Buffalo, New York when the lake freighter was struck by Navishipper, a Greek-registered freighter that had departed Toledo, Ohio without a maritime pilot aboard. No one was seriously injured in the collision, but Arthur B. Homer suffered significant damage to its bow with a roughly 10-by-12-foot (3.0 by 3.7 m) hole torn into it, causing the bow to sink. Five Coast Guard vessels and a helicopter were ordered to the scene. (Note: The Greek freighter's name spelled Navishipper or Navi Shipper based on different sources.) With the aid of two tugboats, Arthur B. Homer was taken to Cleveland to discharge its cargo of taconite. Arthur B. Homer was then towed to American Shipbuilding of Lorain, Ohio to undergo repairs.

In 1974, Arthur B. Homer remained trapped on Lake Ontario after its sister ship Steelton collided with a bridge at Port Robinson, stopping all shipping until the structure was removed. During the winter of 1975–1976, the ship was lengthened by Fraser Shipyards in Superior, Wisconsin. The vessel returned to service in January 1976. On July 2, 1977, Arthur B. Homer lost a propeller blade in Lake Huron and was taken to Lorain to get it replaced. In 1978, the propeller blades were replaced after they were found to be loose or cracked. The ship was laid up on October 4, 1980, at Erie, Pennsylvania and did not sail again. Towed to Port Colborne, Ontario on Lake Erie in December 1986, she was scrapped in 1987 and remains the largest ship ever scrapped on the Great Lakes.

== See also ==
- SS Edmund Fitzgerald - The Homer's sister ship constructed in the same shipyard (GLEW), a former lake freighter in service from 1958-1975, sunk during a storm in 1975.
