= Phil Nuytten =

Canadian deep-ocean explorer, scientist, and inventor of the Newtsuit

René Théophile Nuytten OC OBC
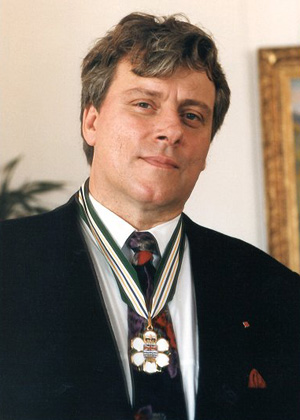
- Nuytten receiving the Order of British Columbia in 1992
- Born: 13 August 1941; Vancouver, British Columbia, Canada
- Died: 13 May 2023 (aged 81)
- Citizenship: Canadian
- Occupations: Entrepreneur, deep-ocean explorer, scientist, inventor
- Years active: 1955–2023
- Employer: Self
- Organization: Nuytco Research Ltd.
- Known for: Newtsuit

René Théophile "Phil" Nuytten OC OBC (13 August 1941 – 13 May 2023) was a Canadian entrepreneur, deep-ocean explorer, scientist, inventor of the Newtsuit, and founder of Nuytco Research Ltd.

He pioneered designs related to diving equipment, and worked with NASA for more than 25 years on applications related to undersea and space technologies.

Today, his equipment is used by a wide range of organizations, including the National Geographic Society, NASA, and is standard for almost a dozen navies.

== Early life ==
Nuytten was born in Vancouver, British Columbia of Métis ancestry. He was subsequently formally adopted into the Kwakiutl nation. He began to design diving gear as a teenager, and opened the first dive shop in Western Canada at the age of 15. At the age of 16, he was one of the first two rescue divers on scene after the 1958 Second Narrows Bridge collapse.

== Career ==
Nuytten worked in numerous countries as a commercial diver. In his work for the commercial, scientific, and military industries, he developed equipment and deep-water diving, and technical diving techniques.

During the 1960s and 1970s, Nuytten was involved in the development of mixed-gas decompression tables. He was part of a team that accomplished the first 600 FSW (feet of seawater) ocean "bounce" dives on Project Nesco.

In the 1970s, he co-founded Oceaneering International, Inc. This company became one of the largest underwater skills companies in the world.

In 1983, Nuytten appeared on the cover of National Geographic due to his dives into arctic waters to Breadalbane.

== Totem poles ==
Nyutten was trained to carve totem poles by Kwakwakaʼwakw carver Ellen Neel. In 1982, he published The Totem Carvers, a book about carvers Mungo Martin, Ellen Neel, and Charlie James.

== Death ==
Nuytten died the 13 May 2023 aged 81, his family releasing an obituary detailing the significance of his life and contributions to the scientific field.

== Media appearances ==
=== Print ===
Resulting from his contributions to marine diving technologies, Nuytten appeared in the media numerous times, including: National Geographic, Time, Newsweek, Popular Science, Discovery, Fortune, Scientific American and Business Week.

=== Film and television ===
For twenty years, Nuytten was featured in and worked on the production of films and television programs based on technology he developed, such as:

- Descent of Man (CBC)
- Mysteries of the Sea (NBC)
- Pressure Point (Walt Disney)
- [Pacific Abyss] (BBC)
- [Jaws of Death] (Bruce Martin Productions)
- [Octopus Hunt] National Film Board of Canada)
- [28 Above, Below] (National Film Board of Canada
- [D Day, Underwater] (Discovery Channel)

Nuytten provided the submersibles and was the senior technical advisor for the film The Abyss. His Newtsuit is featured in the IMAX movie Flight of the Aquanaut.

== Newtsuit ==
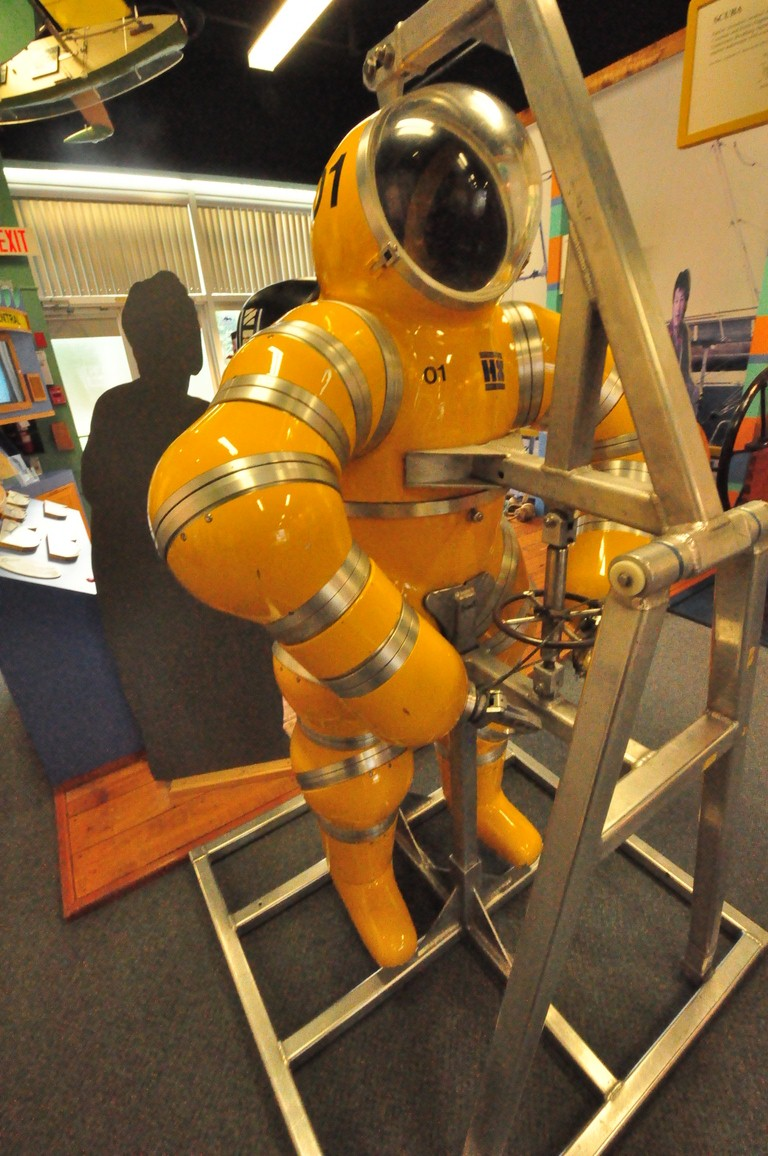
A Newtsuit

In 1979, Nuytten started work on the Newtsuit, a one-atmosphere diving suit. The revolutionary new design featured fully articulated rotary joints. This patented breakthrough design is now used in many subsequent atmospheric diving suits.

== Exosuit ==
In 2000, Nuytten announced that he was developing a new type ultra lightweight powered exoskeleton called the Exosuit This new design was being considered for use as a submarine escape device by the Canadian Department of Defense.

== Vent-Base Alpha ==
It was announced in September 2018 that Nuytten was designing and planned to build an underwater human settlement off of the coast of Vancouver, Canada, in the Pacific Ocean. A prototype was to be built as early as 2019, with cylindrical living chambers powered from Stirling engines powered by hydrothermal vent sources. The buildings would be built on land and transported likely to the Juan de Fuca Strait, and submerged a few thousand feet below the surface.

== Awards and commendations ==
- Academy of Underwater Arts and Sciences (Hall of Fame membership)
- American Association of Aeronautics and Astronautics
- American Institute of Aeronautics and Astronautics (Life Sciences Award)
- Canadian Advanced Technology Award
- Canadian Award for Business Excellence
- Contractors International’s Commercial Diving (Hall of Fame membership)
- Diving Association of Diving Contractors
- Diving Hall of Fame (induction)
- Explorers Club (Lowell Thomas award in 2000)
- John Galletti Memorial Award
- Jules Verne Award
- Order of British Columbia
- Simon Fraser University (honorary Doctor of Laws degree)
- Order of Canada (2017)

== See also ==
- Technical diving
- Scuba diving
