= Newtsuit =

Atmospheric diving suit designed by Phil Nuytten

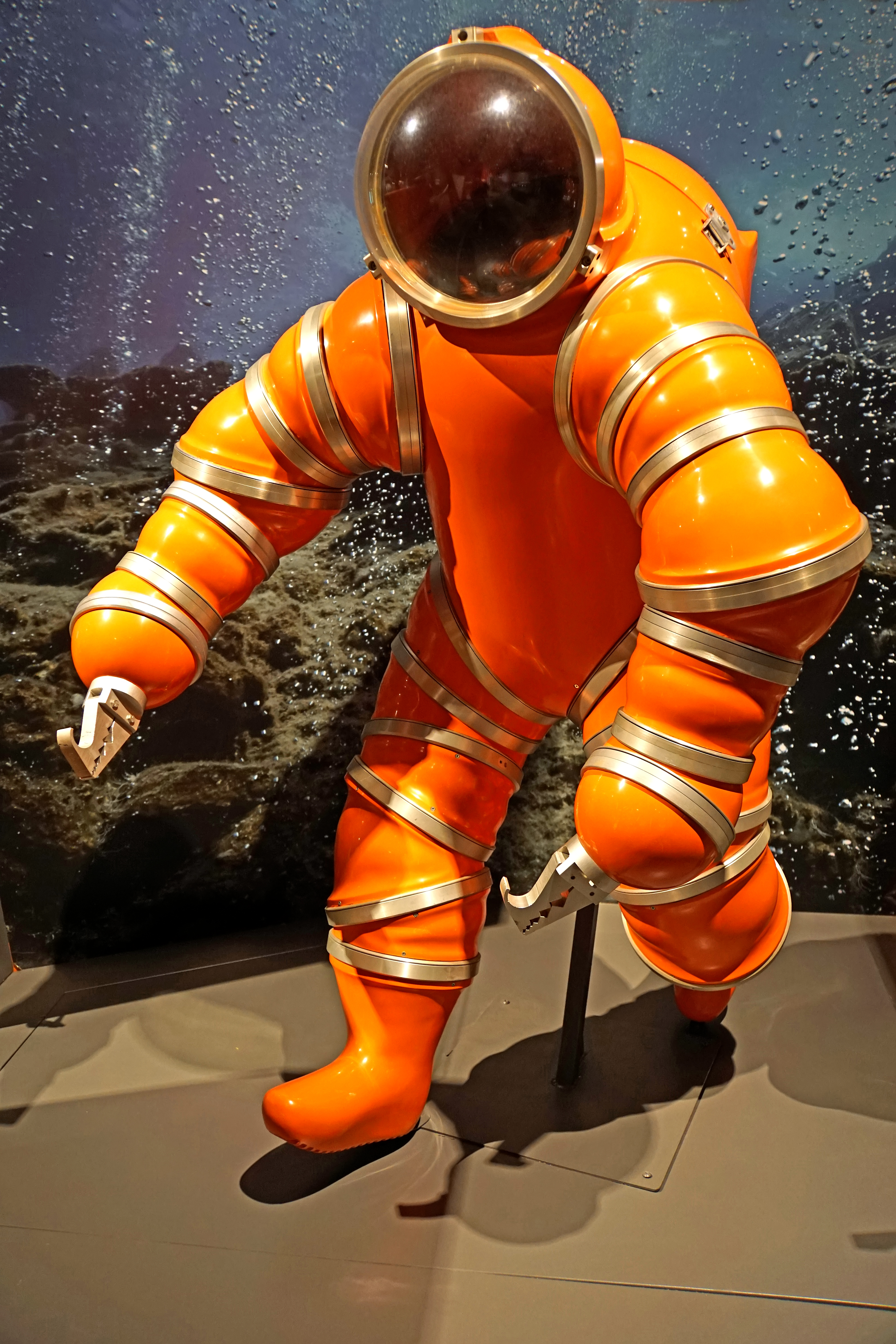
The Newtsuit has fully articulated, rotary joints in the arms and legs. These provide substantial mobility, while remaining largely unaffected by high pressures.

The Newtsuit is an atmospheric diving suit designed and originally built by Phil Nuytten.

The suit is used for work on ocean drilling rigs, pipelines, salvage jobs, and photographic surveys, and is standard equipment in many of the world's navies.

This aluminum hard suit has fully articulated, rotary joints in the arms and legs, giving the pilot a substantial range of mobility. These joints operate freely at high pressures. At the time the suit was constructed, it was the first of its kind in this regard. The pilot can control objects and handle tools with manipulator jaws at the ends of the arms. Although the suit is certified to 300 metres (980 ft), it has been tested to 900 metres (3,000 ft).

The suit can be operated untethered, with a thruster pack that can be fitted to the suit. This allows mobility in mid-water. The Newtsuit navigates with foot controls. The left foot provides vertical control, with the right foot providing lateral control. Other equipment that can be attached includes twin video cameras, colour imaging sonar, and an atmospheric monitoring system (AMS) that transmits information to the surface, such as CO_{2}, HPO (high pressure oxygen), O_{2}%, depth, temperature, and cabin pressure.

Communication is achieved through digital voice/data transmission via water and umbilical cable.

== Specifications ==
- Length: 162 – 193 cm (5'4" – 6'4")
- Beam: 76 cm (30")
- Weight: 275 to 378 kg (606 to 833 lb)
- Weight in water: −2 to −4 kg (−4 to −8 lbs) flying mode
- Hull: A356 cast aluminum
- Propulsion: two thruster packs (constant with variable pitch)
- Operational depth: 305 m (1000 ft) (tested to 900 m (3,000 ft))
- Power: two electric 2.25 hp (at 400 Hz) electric motors, supplied by an umbilical cord to the surface ship, 5 hour emergency supply from battery
- Life support: closed circuit rebreather, (up to 48 hours) with fan powered CO_{2} scrubber, and a back-up emergency rebreather circulated by breathing.

== Emergency equipment ==
In the event of an emergency, the suit is equipped with the following:

- Tether cutter
- 37.5 kHz pinger
- Ballast jettison
- Xenon strobe
- Radio frequency beacon

== Exosuit ==
The newest generation of this type of suit is called the Exosuit, also designed by Phil Nuytten.

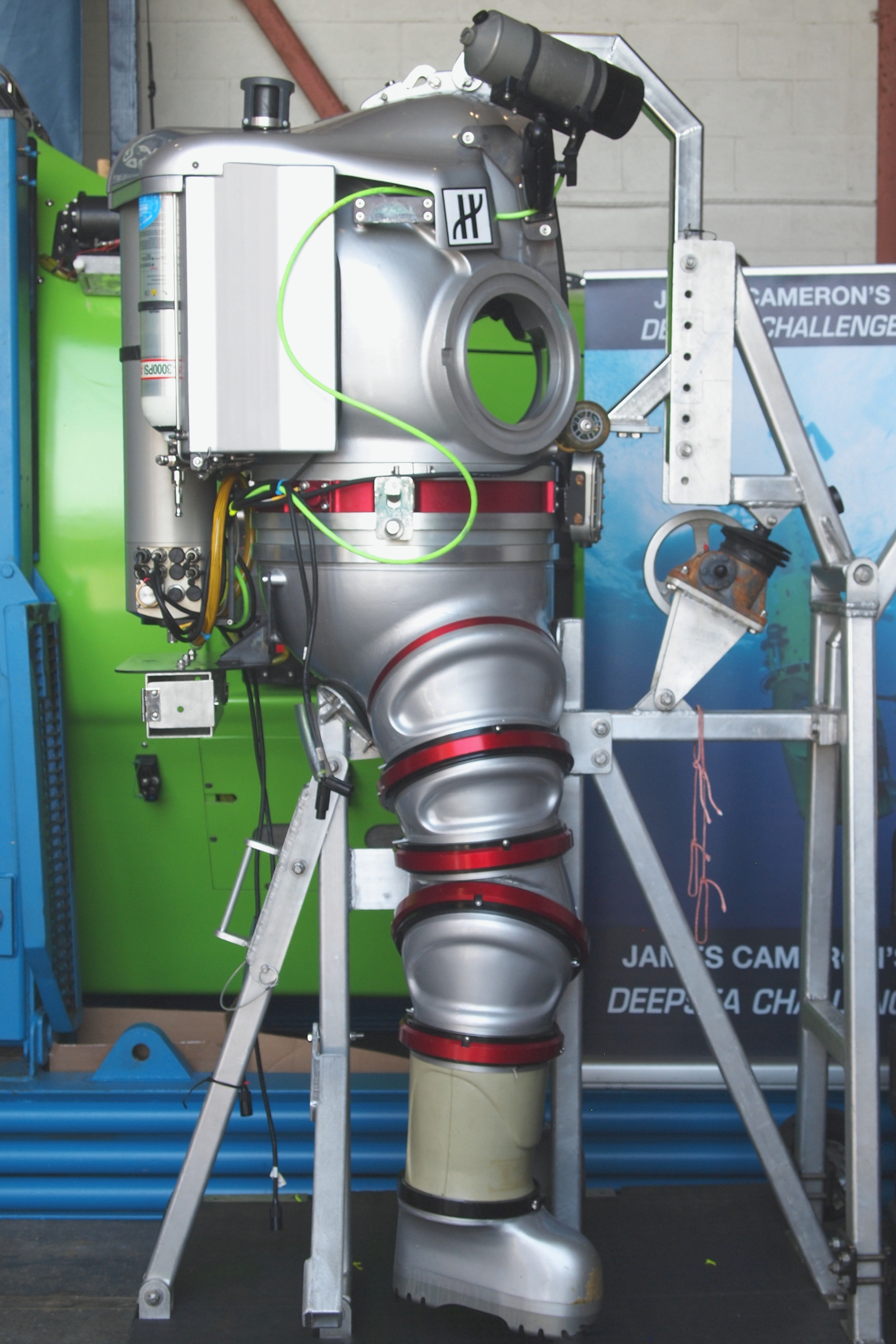
Side view of Exosuit

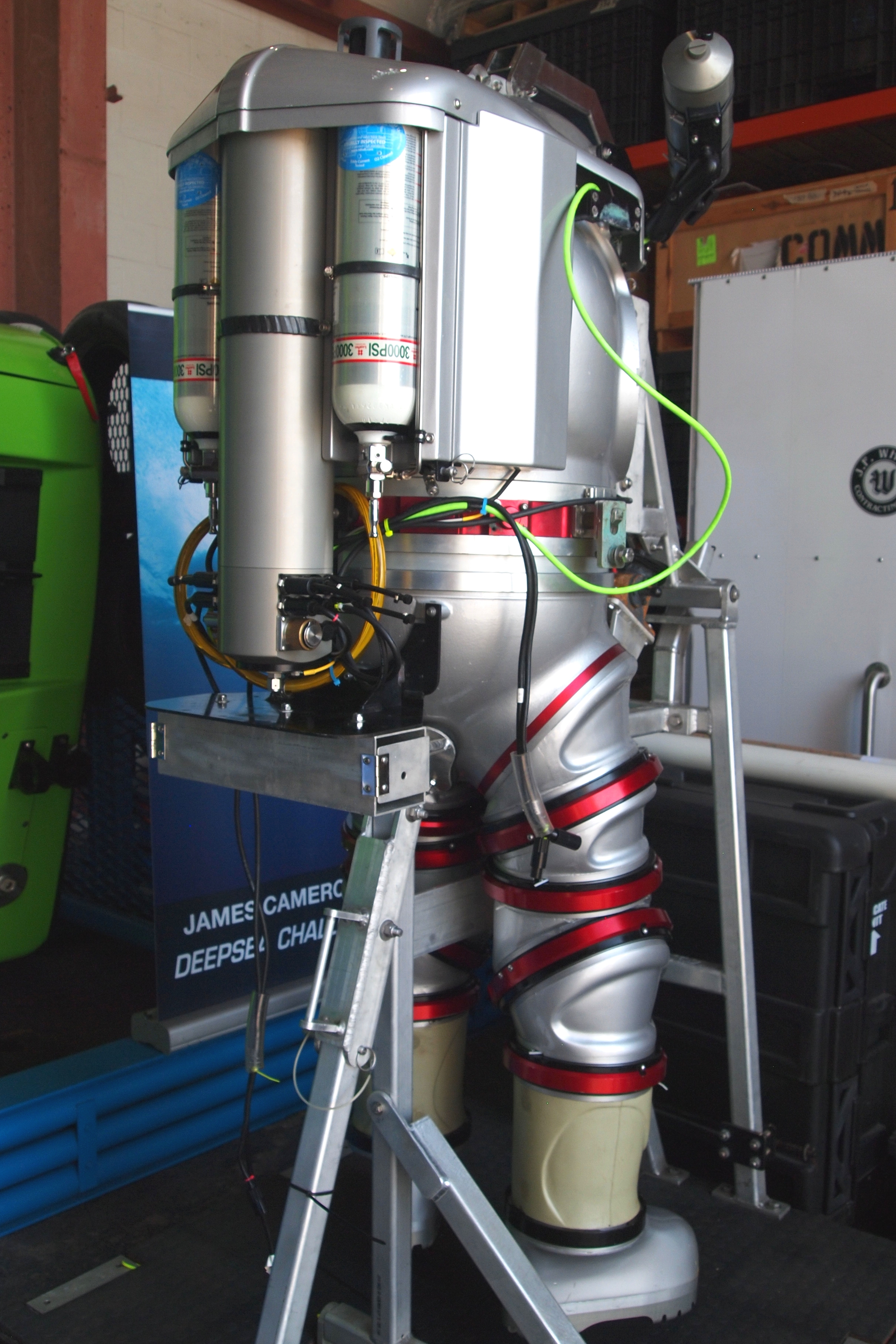
Back view of Exosuit
