= Antelope (shipwreck) =

Wreck of a Great Lakes steamship that was converted into a schooner barge

Coordinates: 46.6850°N 90.8252°W

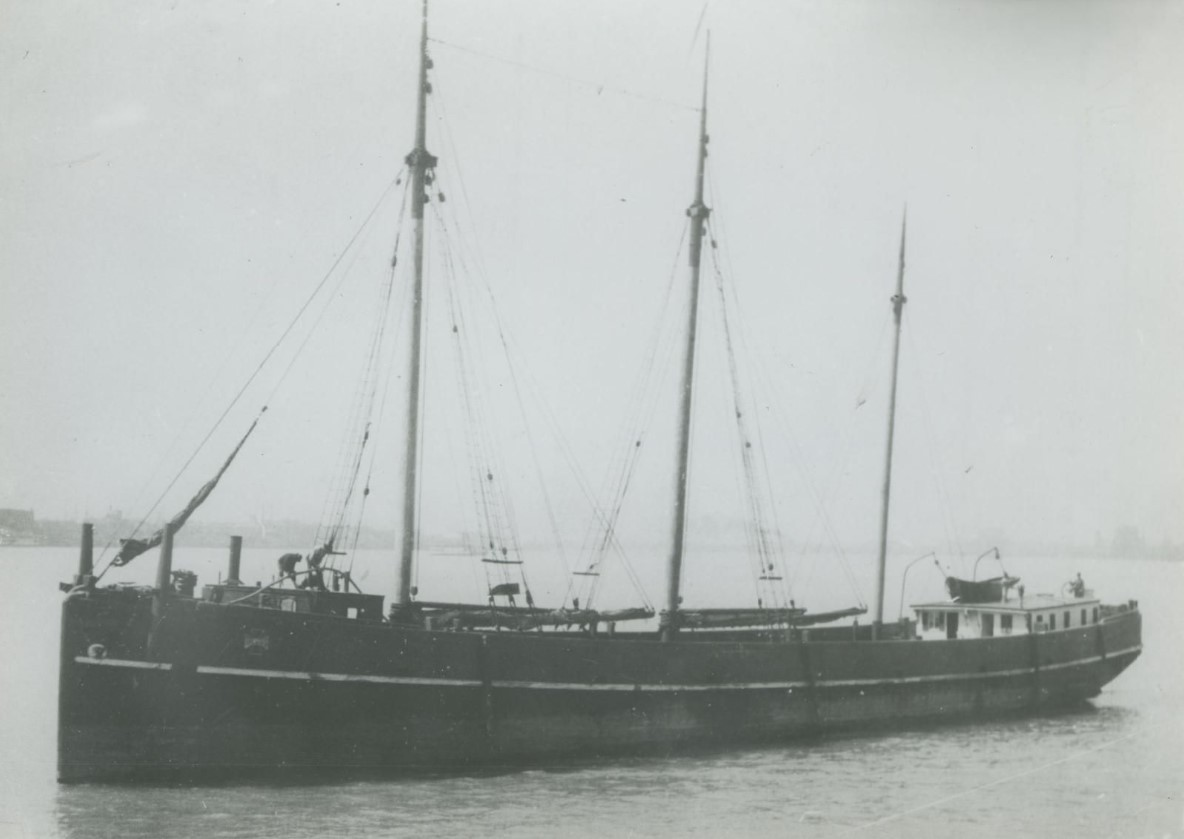
- Antelope underway

History

United States
- Name: Antelope
- Owner: L.S. Bowtell, Bay City, Michigan (in 1861)
- Launched: 1861
- Fate: Sank 1897

General characteristics
- Type: Steamship (1861–1880s), schooner barge (1880s–1897)
- Tonnage: 523.45 gross register tons
- Length: 186.8 ft (56.9 m)
- Beam: 32 to 34 ft (9.8 to 10.4 m) (sources disagree)
- Depth of hold: 12 ft (3.7 m)
- Propulsion: Steam engine (1861–1880s), sails (1880s–1897)
- Sail plan: Schooner rig, 3 masts (from 1880s)

Antelope was a Great Lakes steamship that later was converted into a schooner barge) and sank in Lake Superior near the Apostle Islands in 1897.

== Service history ==
J. L. Wolverton built Antelope in Newport, Michigan, in 1861 for L. S. Bowtell of Bay City, Michigan. One of the early steamships on the Great Lakes, she carried passengers between Buffalo, New York and Chicago, Illinois. She burned at Buffalo in 1867, but was rebuilt and returned to service. In the 1880s she was converted into a three-masted schooner barge to haul freight. Despite the removal of her steam engine and boiler — which made more room for cargo — she continued to carry a funnel for the rest of her career.

On October 7, 1897, Antelope was loaded with 1,000 tons of coal and under tow by the steamship Hiram W. Sibley. Both ships were on a voyage from Sandusky, Ohio, to deliver coal to the Pennsylvania and Ashland Coal Company dock in Ashland, Wisconsin. While approaching Michigan Island in the Apostle Islands, Antelope′s seams opened. She began to take on water more quickly than her pumps could pump it out, and she sank in a reported 360 feet (110 m) of water without loss of life. Hiram W. Sibley rescued her crew. Soon after Antelope sank, the schooner Gawn sighted wreckage, including Antelope′s cabin, floating off Michigan Island.

== Wreck ==
Antelope′s wreck was discovered on September 2, 2016. On February 16, 2018, the wreck was placed on the Wisconsin State Register of Historic Places. It was added to the National Register of Historic Places on June 22, 2018.

As of September 2016, the wreck sat upright on the lake bottom in over 300 feet (91 m) of water. Two of the three masts remained standing and still had their full rigging, including deadeyes. The forward cabin was intact, and two large wood stocked anchors were still on board. The rudder and ship's wheel lay on the bottom next to the wreck. The stern deckhouse and mizzen mast were missing.

== See also ==
- List of shipwrecks in the Great Lakes
- Apostle Islands
