= La Pointe, Wisconsin =

- Town
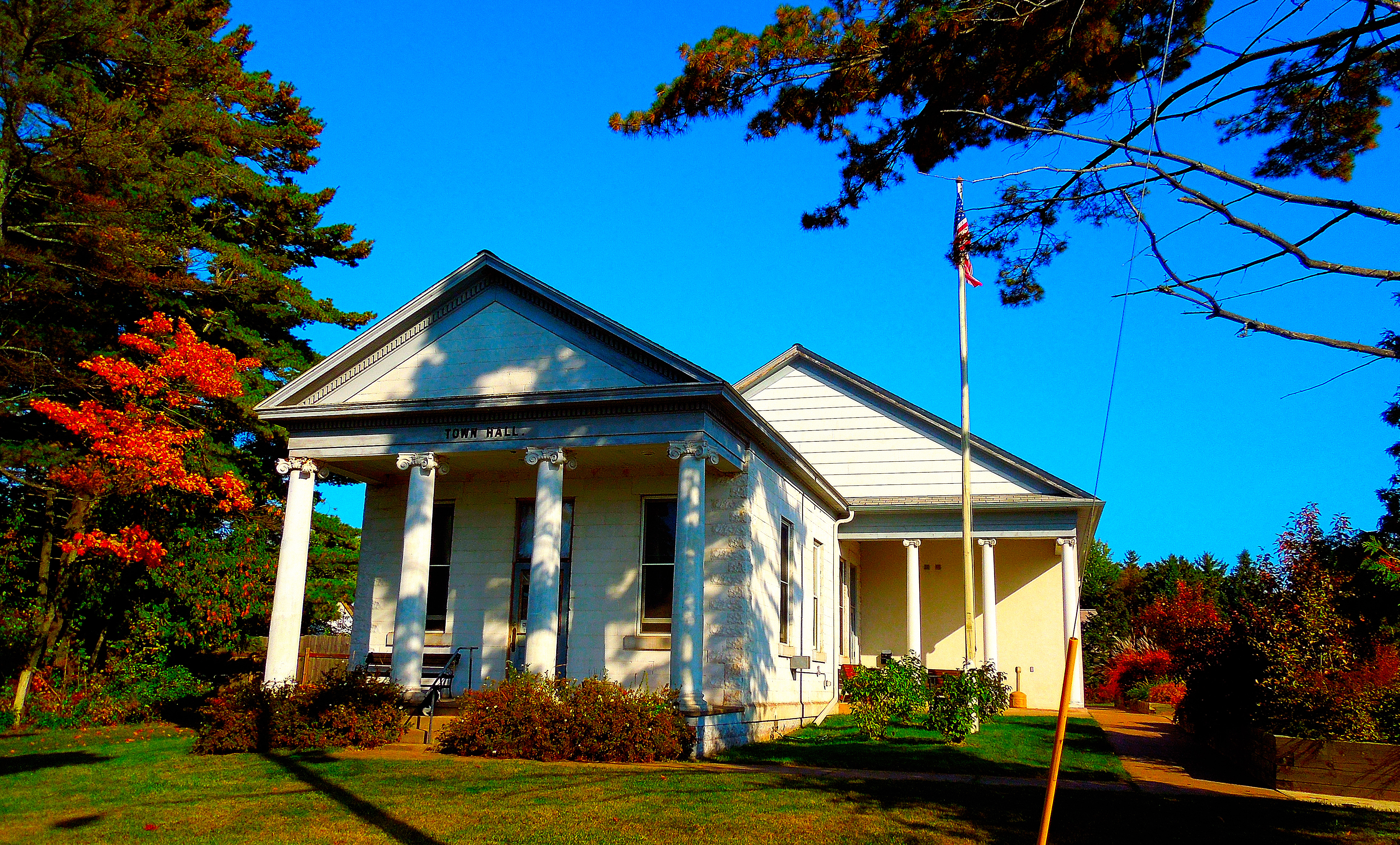
- Town hall

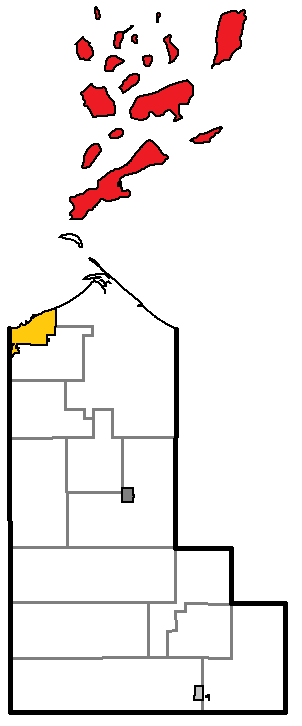
- Location of La Pointe, within Ashland County, Wisconsin

- Location within Wisconsin Location within the United States
- Coordinates: 46°46′45″N 90°47′12″W
- Country: United States
- State: Wisconsin
- County: Ashland

Area
  - Total: 78.1 sq mi (202.4 km^{2})
  - Land: 77.8 sq mi (201.4 km^{2})
  - Water: 0.39 sq mi (1.0 km^{2})
- Elevation: 610 ft (190 m)

Population (2020)
  - Total: 428
  - Density: 5.5/sq mi (2.1/km^{2})
- Time zone: UTC-6 (Central (CST))
  - Summer (DST): UTC-5 (CDT)
- ZIP code: 54850
- Area codes: 715 & 534
- GNIS feature ID: 1567683
- GNIS feature ID: 1583529
- Website: townoflapointewi.gov

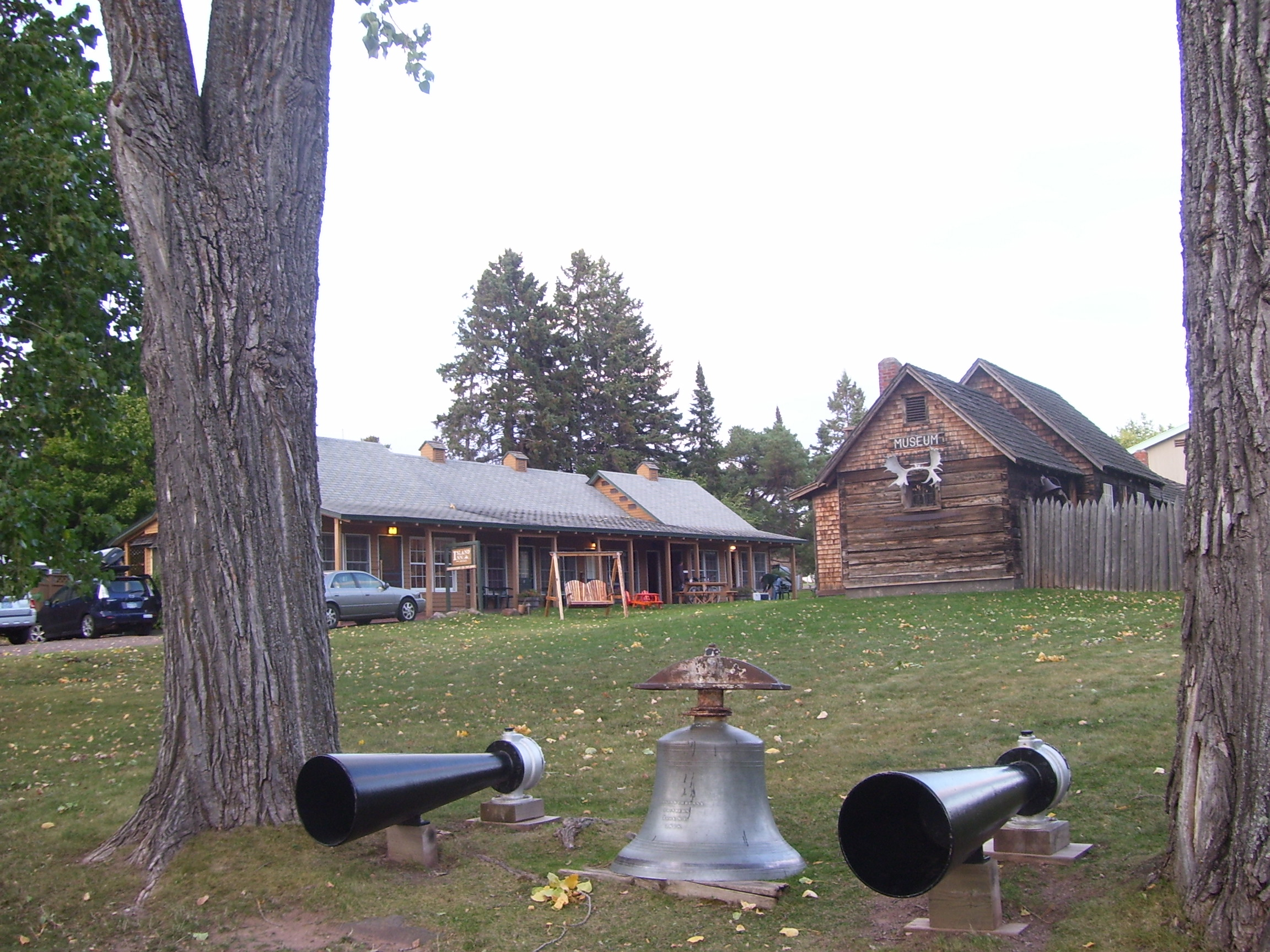
The Madeline Island Museum documents the island's history, and is located near the ferry dock.

La Pointe (Ojibwe: Mooningwanekaaning) is a town in Ashland County, Wisconsin, United States. The town includes all of the Apostle Islands except for the westernmost four, which lie in the towns of Bayfield and Russell in Bayfield County.

While the area encompassing the Town of La Pointe is made up of the entire Apostle Islands archipelago, the residents of the community live on the western shore of Madeline Island, the largest of the Apostle Islands because it is the only Apostle Island open to commercial development. The population was 428 at the 2020 census. Downtown La Pointe is adjacent to the Madeline Island Ferry dock. Neighborhoods include Middleport and Old Fort. La Pointe has a post office with ZIP code 54850. Its name in the Anishinaabe language is Mooningwanekaaning, meaning "The Home of the Golden Breasted Woodpecker".

== Geography ==
According to the United States Census Bureau, the town has a total area of 78.0 square miles (202 km^{2}), of which 77.6 square miles (201 km^{2}) is land and 0.4 square miles (1.0 km^{2}) (0.50%) is water.

Madeline Island is part of the Town of La Pointe. County Highway H serves as a main route. Nearby is Chequamegon Bay, an inlet of Lake Superior.

== History ==
According to William Whipple Warren's History of the Ojibway People (18xx), Moningwunakuaning "is the spot on which the Ojibway tribe first grew, and like a tree it has spread its branches in every direction, in the bands that now [1885] occupy the vast extent of the Ojibway earth; and also that 'it is the root from which all the far scattered villages of the tribe have sprung.'"

La Pointe was originally the site of a fortified French trading post from 1693 to 1698 and from 1718 to 1759. The current city began to develop in the late 18th century as an American Fur Company outpost under the leadership of Michel Cadotte.

Warren, whose mother was French-Ojibwa, learned from maternal tribal elders that the Ojibwa originally lived near the mouth of the St. Lawrence River. At the time of great sickness and death, the Great Spirit interceded through Manabosho, a common uncle of the Anishinubag (spontaneous people). Through the discovery of the snakeroot they were granted the rite, enabled through their Medawe (religion), "wherewith life is restored and prolonged." The great Megis (seashell) showed itself as a glossy thing reflecting on the sea. It led them first to a place near Montreal where they stayed for some time. Next it led them to Boweting (Sault Ste. Marie); again they stayed for some time. At last it led them to Moningwunakauning (La Pointe, Madeline Island), "where it has ever since reflected back the rays of the sun, and blessed our ancestors with life, light and wisdom," says Warren. So the flickering shaft of light is the Megis, and La Pointe is the center of the Earth for the Ojibwa.

Kechewaishke, commonly known as Chief Buffalo, was an Ojibwa leader born at La Pointe in 1759. Recognized as the principal chief of the Lake Superior Chippewa (Ojibwa) for nearly a half-century until his death in 1855, he led his nation into a treaty relationship with the United States Government, signing treaties in 1825, 1826, 1837, 1842, 1847, and 1854. He was also instrumental in resisting the efforts of the United States to remove the Ojibwa and in securing permanent reservations for his people near Lake Superior.

Licensed Indian traders operated at this location and nearby stores at Lac Courte Oreilles Reservation and other convenient places.

Today, the town's history is preserved at Madeline Island Historical Museum.

== Demographics ==
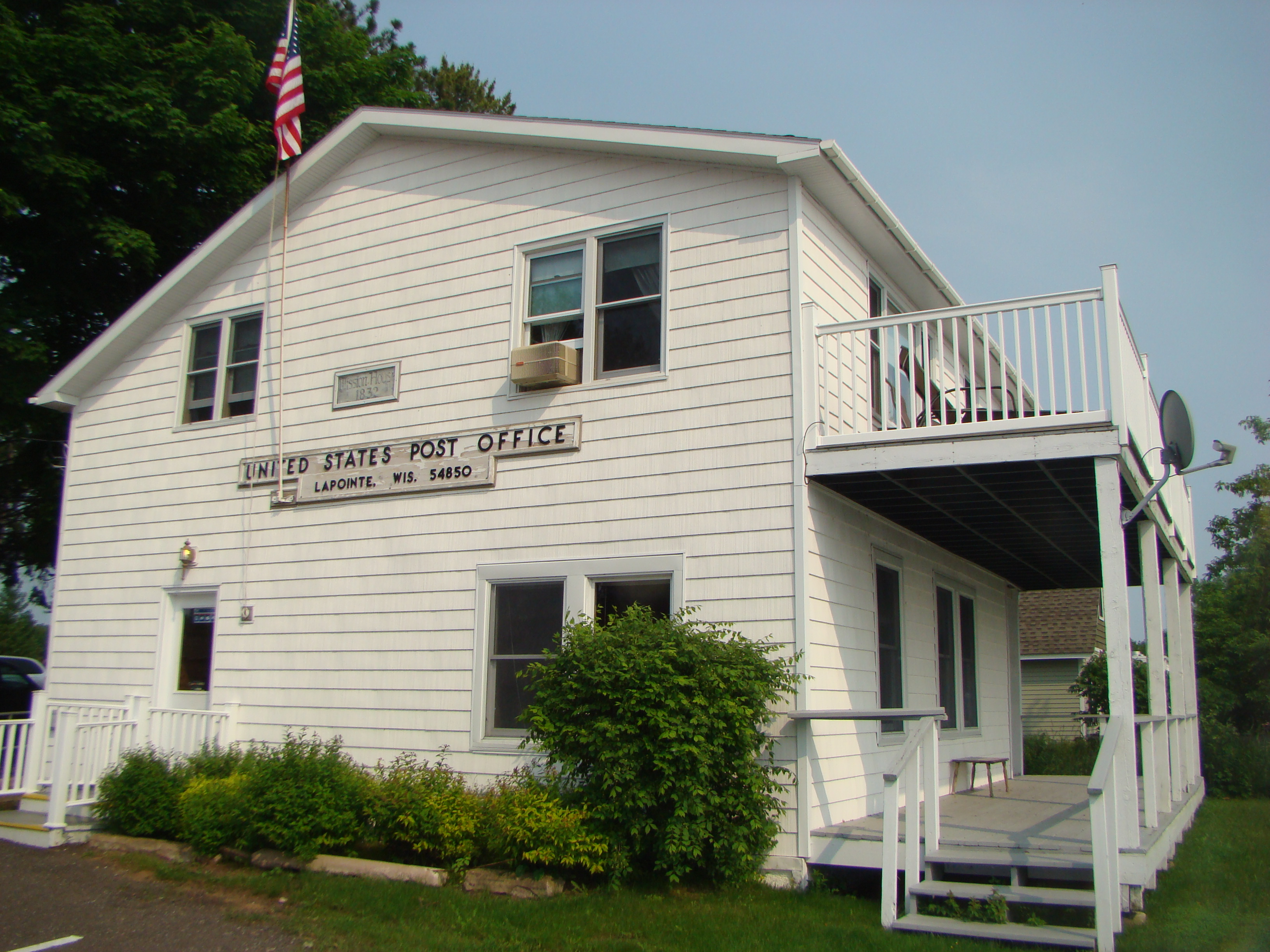
The Madeline Island Post Office. The historic building used to be part of the Old Mission, which was the first Protestant mission on the island.

Historical population
Census	Pop.	Note	%±
1900	292		—
1910	198		−32.2%
1920	497		151.0%
1930	235		−52.7%
1940	236		0.4%
1950	186		−21.2%
1960	130		−30.1%
1970	159		22.3%
1980	156		−1.9%
1990	147		−5.8%
2000	246		67.3%
2010	261		6.1%
2020	428		64.0%
U.S. Decennial Census

=== 2020 census ===
As of the census of 2020, the population was 428. The population density was 5.5 inhabitants per square mile (2.1/km^{2}). There were 848 housing units at an average density of 10.9 per square mile (4.2/km^{2}). The racial makeup of the town was 88.1% White, 3.5% Black or African American, 1.4% Native American, 0.7% from other races, and 6.3% from two or more races. Ethnically, the population was 1.6% Hispanic or Latino of any race.

=== 2000 census ===
As of the census of 2000, there were 246 people, 125 households, and 66 families residing in the town. The population density was 3.2 people per square mile (1.2 people/km^{2}). There were 692 housing units at an average density of 8.9 per square mile (3.4/km^{2}). The racial makeup of the town was 94.72% White, 1.63% Native American, 0.41% Pacific Islander, 0.41% from other races, and 2.85% from two or more races. Hispanic or Latino of any race were 0.41% of the population.

There were 125 households, out of which 22.4% had children under the age of 18 living with them, 44.0% were married couples living together, 4.8% had a female householder with no husband present, and 46.4% were non-families. 40.8% of all households were made up of individuals, and 13.6% had someone living alone who was 65 years of age or older. The average household size was 1.96 and the average family size was 2.64.

In the town, the population was spread out, with 19.1% under the age of 18, 2.8% from 18 to 24, 24.4% from 25 to 44, 34.1% from 45 to 64, and 19.5% who were 65 years of age or older. The median age was 46 years. For every 100 females, there were 119.6 males. For every 100 females age 18 and over, there were 116.3 males.

The median income for a household in the town was $33,500, and the median income for a family was $42,708. Males had a median income of $29,583 versus $31,042 for females. The per capita income for the town was $23,352. None of the families and 4.6% of the population were living below the poverty line, including no under eighteens and 2.1% of those over 64.

== Government ==
=== Local government ===
La Pointe is governed by an elected five-person board of supervisors and an appointed town administrator, along with several boards of volunteers; in addition, some decisions are made by the voters directly through town meetings. As of June 2021, the town administrator is Lisa Potswald, the chair of the board of supervisors is Glenn Carlson (term on board ends 2023), and the board's other members are Aimee Baxter (term on board ends 2023), John Carlson (2023), Mike Anderson (2022), and Sue Brenna (2022).

The town employs a police and fire department and has a public library and elementary school; from sixth grade on, students attend school in Bayfield.

=== Federal and state representation ===
La Pointe is in Wisconsin's 7th congressional district, represented by Tom Tiffany (R); the 25th Wisconsin State Senate district, represented by Romaine Quinn (R); and the 74th Wisconsin State Assembly district, represented by Chanz Green (R).

== Tourism ==
Tourism makes up a large part of the local economy. La Pointe, like Bayfield (on the mainland), has become a popular tourist destination during the summer, when many local events are scheduled.

Downtown La Pointe offers many bars, restaurants, and other amenities. These include indigenous restaurant Miijim, whose owner and chef, Bryce Stevenson, was a 2024 semifinalist for the James Beard Foundation's national award for emerging chef. Camping, swimming, hiking, and other outdoor recreational activities are abundant and popular on the island.

== Travel ==
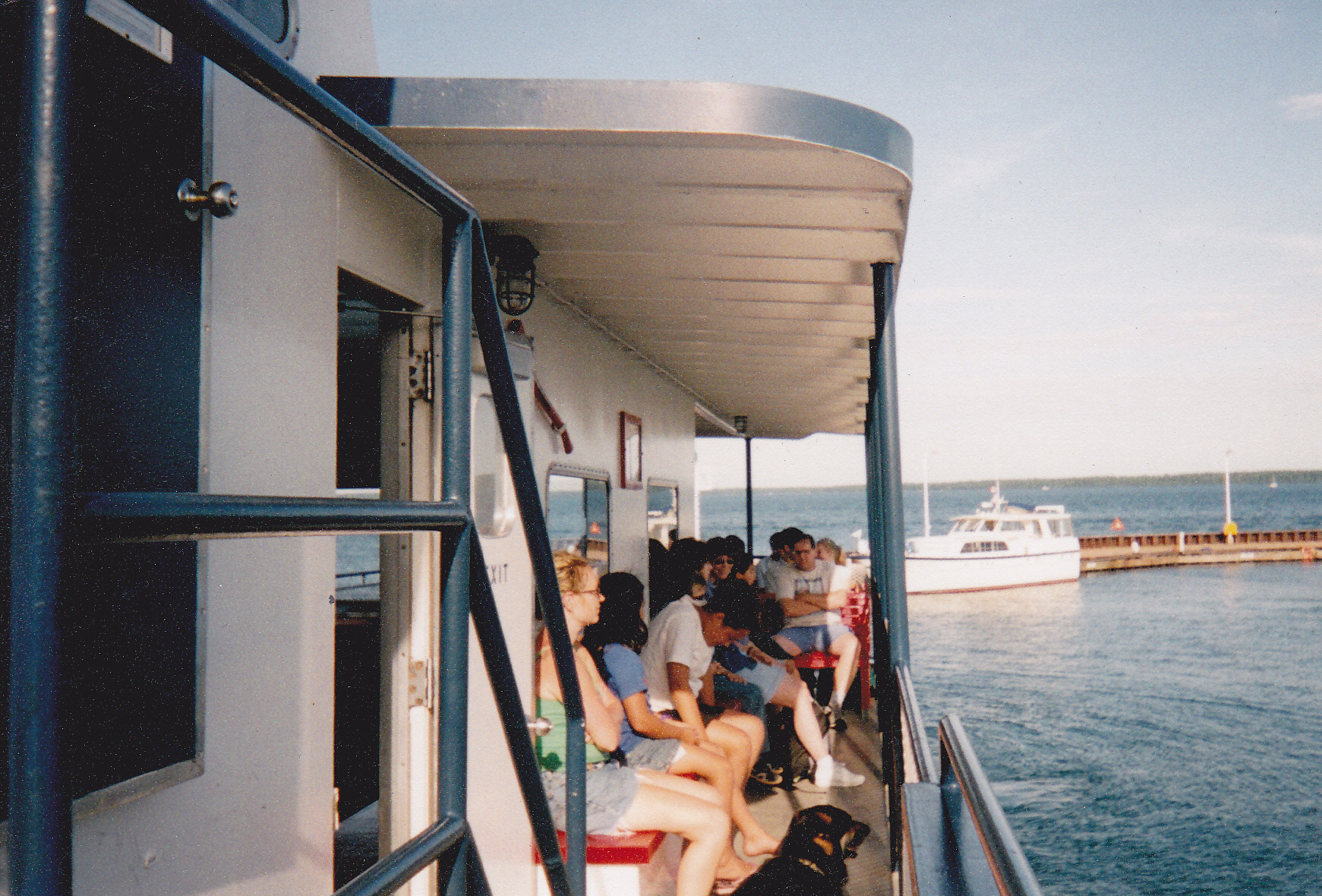
Passengers on the Madeline Island Ferry boat, awaiting their arrival to the Island.

Madeline Island and the town of La Pointe are accessible by the Madeline Island Ferry line. The steel-hulled car/passenger ferries depart from Bayfield on a set schedule. Many attractions on the island are within walking distance of the ferry dock, such as the museum and library. It may be necessary to bring a vehicle to reach attractions that are farther away, such as Big Bay State Park. County Highway H serves as a main route in the community.

There is also a public boat marina near the ferry dock.

Ground transportation to the island during the winter (late December through February) is by way of an ice road, which is open when ice levels are safe enough for vehicles to pass.

The Major Gilbert Field Airport (FAA LID: 4R5) is a general aviation airport that features a 3,000-foot by 75-foot landing strip, as well as overnight tie-downs and an array of other services. The airport is publicly owned by the Town of La Pointe.

== Notable people ==
- Kechewaishke, Native American leader
- Michel Cadotte, prominent fur trader
- Ozhaguscodaywayquay, noted Native American businesswoman
- Thomas D. O'Brien, Justice of the Minnesota Supreme Court
- William Whipple Warren, Minnesota Territory legislator

== Gallery ==
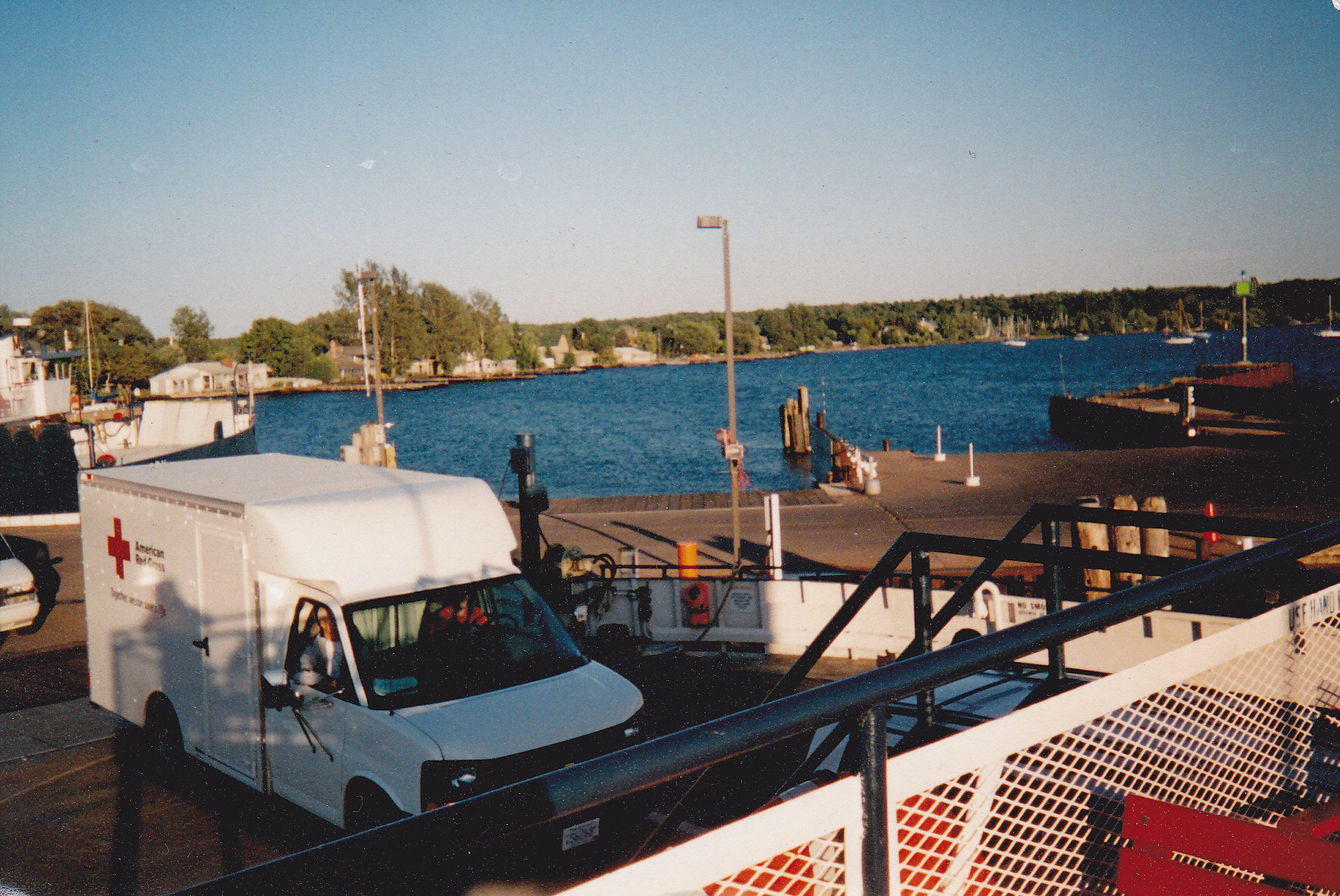
Vehicles loading onto the Madeline Island ferry boat

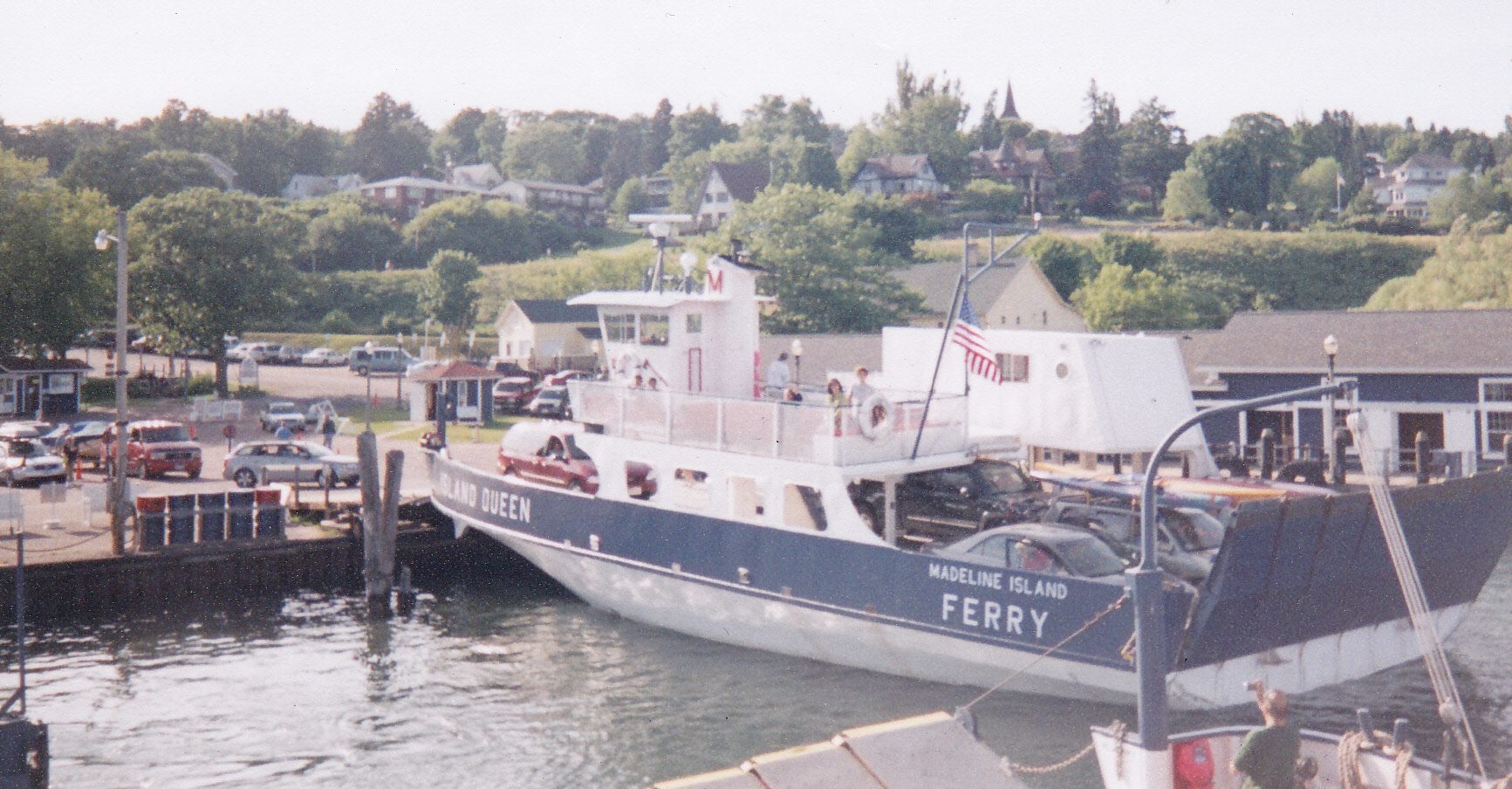
The Island Queen ferry boat

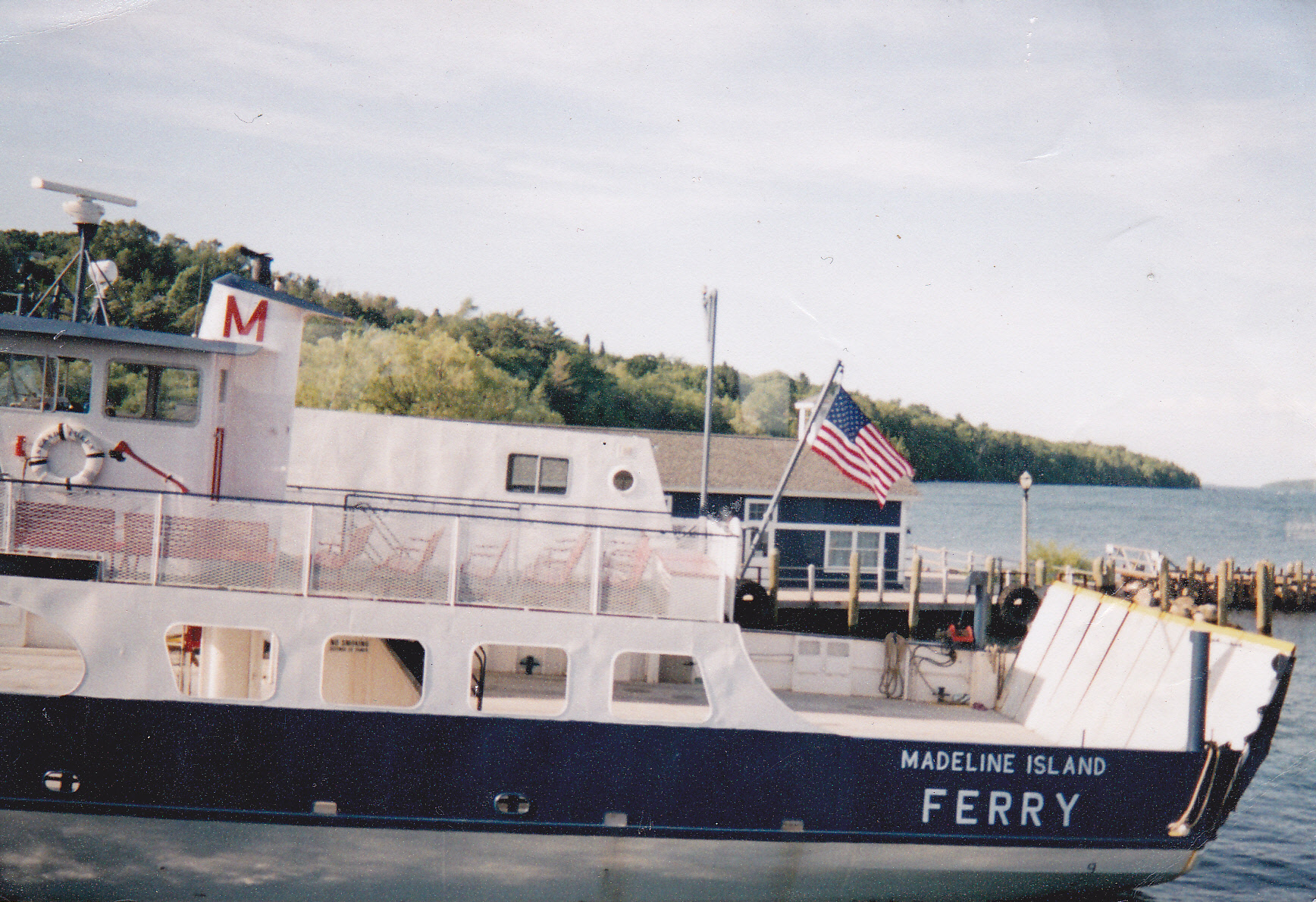
Madeline Island ferry boat

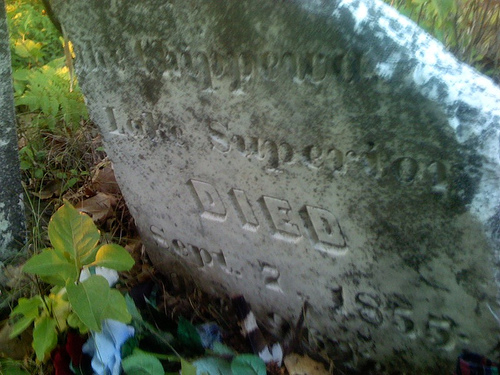
Headstone of Great Buffalo, in the La Pointe Indian Cemetery.

== See also ==
- Islands of the Midwest
- Islands of the Great Lakes
- Populated islands of the Great Lakes
