= Gull Island Light (Wisconsin) =

- Location: Gull Island, Apostle Islands, Wisconsin
- Coordinates: 46°54′24″N 90°26′38″W

Tower
- Construction: Steel skeletal
- Automated: 1929
- Height: 55 feet (17 m)
- Shape: Pyramidal

Light
- First lit: 1929
- Focal height: 55 feet (17 m)
- Lens: Sun valve (original), 9.8-inch (250 mm) (current)
- Range: 7 nautical miles (13 km; 8.1 mi)
- Characteristic: Fl W 2.5s

Gull Island Light is a steel skeletal tower with an automated navigational beacon on Gull Island in Lake Superior, within Apostle Islands National Lakeshore in Ashland County, Wisconsin. Proposals for a light on or near Gull Island date to 1863, but the beacon was not established until 1929. During the intervening decades, several vessels grounded or were wrecked on the shoals around Gull and nearby Michigan Island.

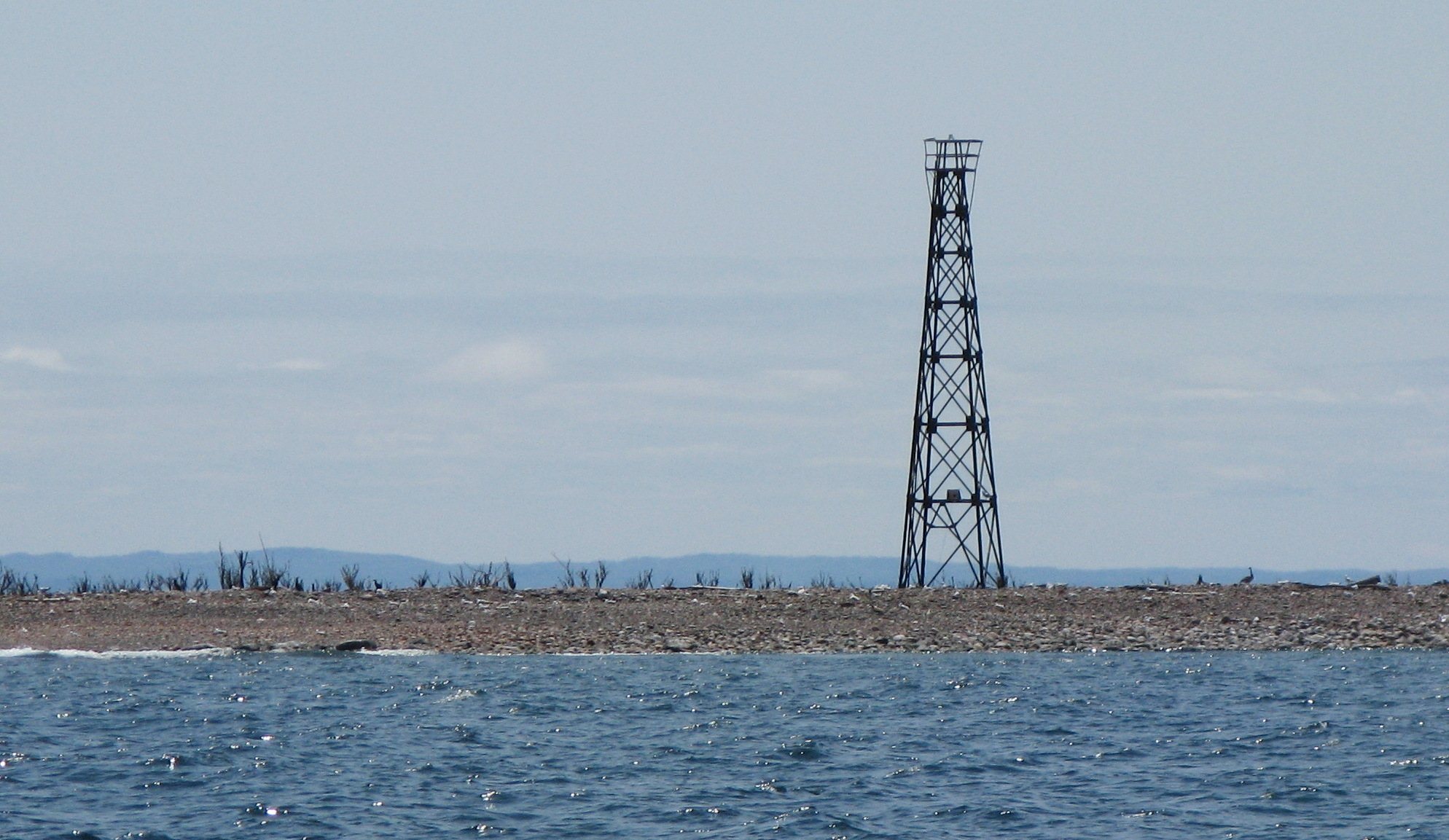
Gull Island Light, Apostle Islands National Lakeshore, 2011

== Geography and navigational hazards ==
Gull Island is the smallest of the Apostle Islands, measuring about one and a half acres at present. Photographs from the early twentieth century show that the island was once considerably larger, with a mound at the center. The island was substantial enough at that time to accommodate one or more fish camps, but erosion since then reduced the island's area and completely flattened the mound. Today, the island appears just a few feet above lake level, and represents the only exposed portion of a much larger shoal running northeasterly from nearby Michigan Island.

The earliest known mention of the need for a light on Gull Island was expressed in an 1863 exchange of correspondence between Gen. Joseph G. Totten of the Army Corps of Engineers and Commissioner J. M. Edmunds of the General Land Office requesting that Gull Island be set aside for the purpose of establishing a lighthouse. It is unclear what action, if any, was taken in response to this request.

In 1865 the steamer Iron City became the first known casualty of the Gull Island shoal. Recounting the episode, Captain Alexander McDougall, who would later gain renown as the designer of the whaleback steamer, explained that he was First Mate on the boat and was at the wheel when it occurred. "It was smoky, and my eyes dimmed. I made a mistake in the island we were about to pass up, and she slid on the rocky, gravel bottom of Gull Island shoal among thousands of gulls." The boat would eventually break free after several rounds of running the double propellers forward and back.

In 1871, General Orlando M. Poe of the Army Corps of Engineers recommended that Gull Island be set aside for establishment of a lighthouse on Gull Island in a letter to Rear Admiral William Shubrick, chairman of the Lighthouse Board. Shubrick's response has not been preserved. Subsequently, the rocks and shoals around Gull and Michigan Islands would see frequent groundings well into the twentieth century. Some resulted in the total loss of a vessel, and two lives were known to be lost as a consequence:

- 1887: The small schooner Josephine ran ashore on the rocks north of Michigan Island. Some of the cargo was salvaged, but the vessel was a total loss.
- 1889: The steambarge Australasia and its consort, the schooner George, ran aground on the north side of Michigan Island, punching a hole in the schooner's bottom and badly damaging the rudders and steering gear of both ships. The Australasia was reported to be the largest wooden-hulled ship in the world at the time of her launch. Both vessels eventually reentered service after repairs.
- 1898: The steamer Vega and its consort Bulgaria ran ashore on Gull Island during a nor'easter. The forward compartments of the Vega were badly damaged, and it was necessary to jettison about 400 tons of its cargo of coal to free the boat from her predicament.
- 1899: The small package freighter R. G. Stewart ran aground on the Gull Island shoal, then caught fire when the boiler overheated during efforts to free her. The crew herded the cargo of cattle overboard, where they swam safely to Michigan Island, then the nine crewmen and three passengers took to the lifeboat. When the last of the crew attempted to jump aboard, he landed on the gunwale and flipped the lifeboat over, throwing everyone into the water. All persons aboard reached Michigan Island safely except for the crewman who caused the capsizing. The Stewart became a total loss, burning to the waterline.
- 1905: The large steamer William E. Corey ran hard aground on the Gull Island reef on the night of the Mataafa Storm, which caused the loss of 29 ships on the Great Lakes. Efforts to refloat the ship took twelve days, and required the help of four large steamers, two tugs, and the work of 158 men. Both of the tugs, the Edna G. and the Gladiator, ran aground during the salvage operation, but returned to service after repairs. The Corey's career would continue until 1974.
- 1906: The steel steamer Ireland ran aground on the Gull Island reef, where it remained for a full week as salvage efforts continued. Once freed, the ship was put in tow of the steamer Manistique, with the intention of taking the ship to a Duluth shipyard. However, while passing Sand Island, the towline broke loose during a storm. With the weather continuing to deteriorate, the Manistique left for the safety of the North Shore, leaving the Ireland adrift. The tug Crosby was able to rescue all but one of the crew, circling the Ireland eighteen times as each man jumped off. After drifting loose for several days, salvagers were finally able to get a line on the Ireland and tow it into Bayfield harbor.

== Establishment ==
By the early twentieth century, the hazards posed by Gull Island and the surrounding shoals were widely recognized by Lake Superior mariners. In 1907, Representative Elmer A. Morse introduced legislation to authorize a new lighthouse on either Michigan Island or Gull Island. The Lighthouse Board endorsed the proposal, noting, "Vessels bound for Ashland from Keweenaw Point are unable to see Michigan Island light until abreast of it, and this difficulty is increased in time of fog, as there is no fog-signal at Michigan Island. Several vessels have run aground in this vicinity during storms. If there had been a light and fog-signal there, the wrecks might have been prevented."

In response, Congress appropriated funds for a survey to determine the best location for new navigational aids to warn of the hazards. The survey was carried out in 1908 and its findings reported to Congress the following year, concluding that a site on the east end of Michigan Island would be most suitable. The Lighthouse Board submitted a request for funds to construct a new lighthouse and fog signal on Michigan Island in its annual report for 1910, then repeated the request every year until 1918, when the recommendation was changed to include a light on Gull Island. The Lighthouse Board repeated the request annually until 1928, when Congress finally appropriated funds for the project.

Construction began September 5, 1929, and was completed on September 30, when the beacon was lit for the first time. The automated acetylene light was mounted on a skeletal steel tower, 55 feet above the water, and produced 390 candlepower, enabling visibility of up to thirteen miles. The beacon was officially reported in service as of October 1, 1929. Automated operation employed a Dalén sun valve to control the flow of acetylene gas to the lamp. Checking the light and replacing acetylene tanks would be the responsibility of the Michigan Island lightkeepers until 1943, when that station was automated. Subsequently, the acetylene lamp was replaced by a solar-powered beacon.

== Getting there ==
Gull Island is part of Apostle Islands National Lakeshore, which describes the island as inaccessible in all but the most ideal conditions. The island is closed to the public from May 15 to September 1 to protect the island's large breeding bird colony.

== See also ==
- Apostle Islands Lighthouses
