= Apostle Islands =

Lake Superior archipelago in northern Wisconsin, US

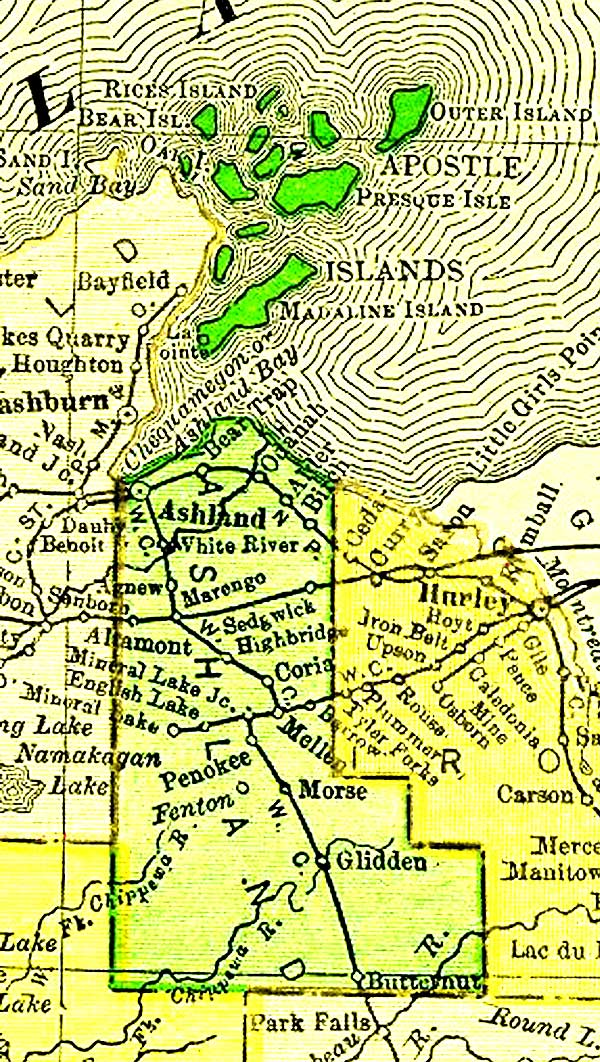
- Ashland County, Wisconsin, from 1895 U.S. Atlas with Apostle Islands located in the north

- Location within Wisconsin Location within the United States

Geography
- Location: Lake Superior
- Coordinates: 46°57′55″N 90°39′51″W

The Apostle Islands are a group of 22 islands in Lake Superior, off the Bayfield Peninsula in northern Wisconsin. The majority of the islands are located in Ashland County—only Sand, York, Eagle, and Raspberry Islands are located in Bayfield County. All the islands except for Madeline Island are part of the Apostle Islands National Lakeshore. The islands in Ashland County are all in the Town of La Pointe, except for Long Island, which is in the Town of Sanborn, while those in Bayfield County are in the Towns of Russell and Bayfield.

== Geology ==
The Apostles are a continuation of the Bayfield Peninsula - sandstone that was laid down by ancient rivers over 500 million years ago. That peninsula was eroded in more recent times - possibly by water flowing beneath the ice of the continental glacier and certainly by Lake Superior storms - with remnants forming the Apostle Islands.

== Environment ==
"The Apostle Islands National Lakeshore provides regionally diverse and unique plant communities." "Over 800 plant species occur within the lakeshore, including Wisconsin listed endangered and threatened species." The Apostles are dominated by boreal forest, composed largely of white spruce (Picea glauca) and balsam fir (Abies balsamea), often mixed with white birch (Betula papyrifera), white cedar (Thuja occidentalis), white pine (Pinus strobus), balsam poplar (Populus balsamifera) and quaking aspen (Populus tremuloides). On Madeline Island, Stockton Island, and several other islands, a unique bog dune ecosystem can be found near deep bays and enclosed lagoons.

According to the National Park Service, "One of the greatest concentrations of black bears in North America is found on Stockton Island in the Apostle Islands National Lakeshore. Bears also regularly inhabit Sand and Oak islands, and, due to their mobility, may be found on just about any of the Apostle Islands."

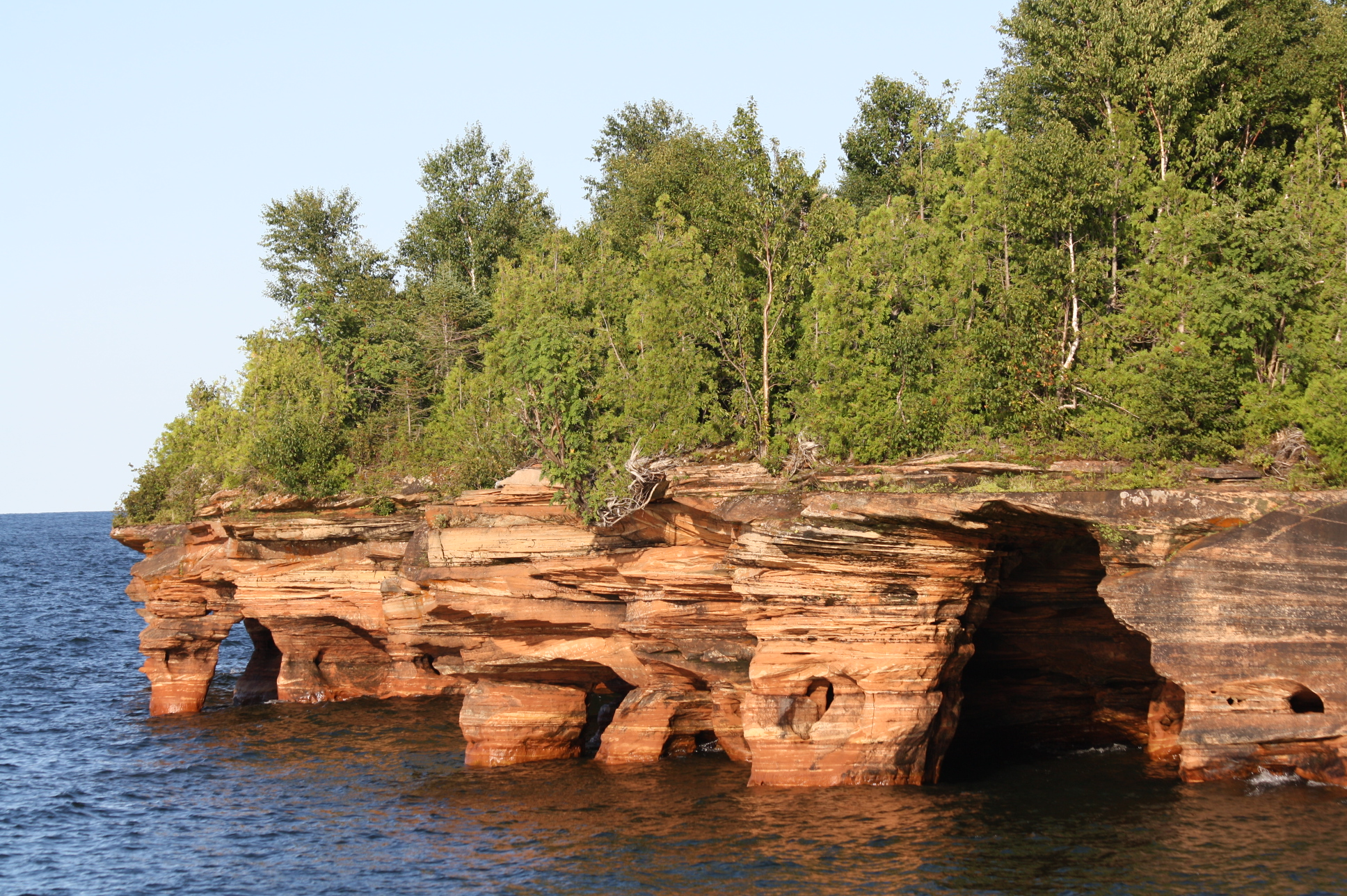
Sea caves at Devils Island

"The Lakeshore provides important nesting habitat for the following colonial nesting birds: herring and ring-billed gulls, double-crested cormorants, great blue herons, and cliff swallows. Gull and Eagle Islands combined have 88% of the lakeshore's breeding herring gull populations and 80% of the herring gull breeding population on the entire Wisconsin shore of Lake Superior. Eagle Island has the only great blue heron rookery in the park."

== Sea caves ==
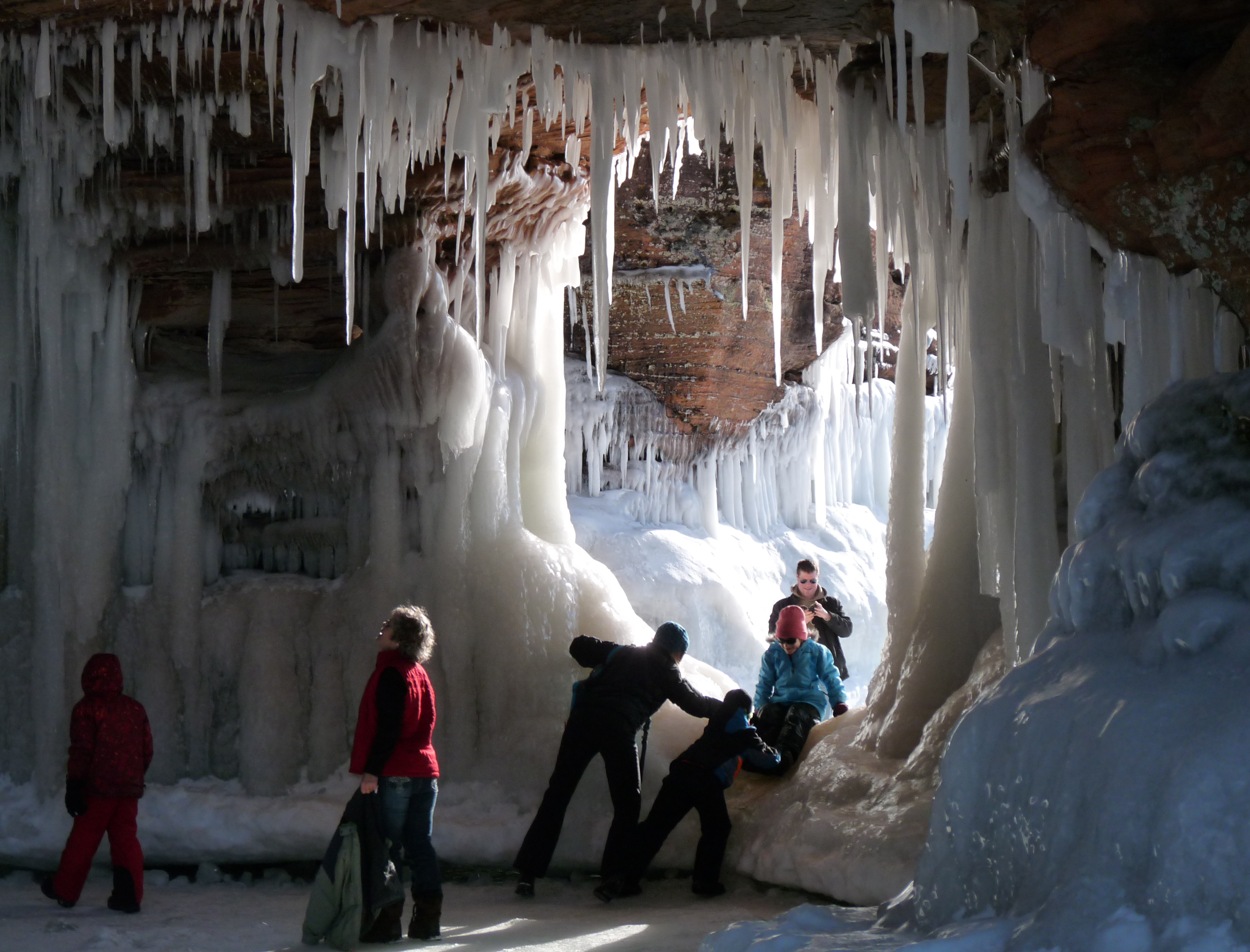
Some winters the lake freezes solid enough that the Park Service lets people walk from Meyers Beach across the lake ice to see the caves.

Good examples of the sea caves of the Great Lakes are located on the shorelines of the Apostle Islands. Examples include the following locations: Swallow Point on Sand Island, the North Shore of Devils Island, and near Mawikwe Bay on the mainland. Arches and delicate chambers are visible. During the winters, visitors can see frozen waterfalls and chambers filled with delicate icicles.

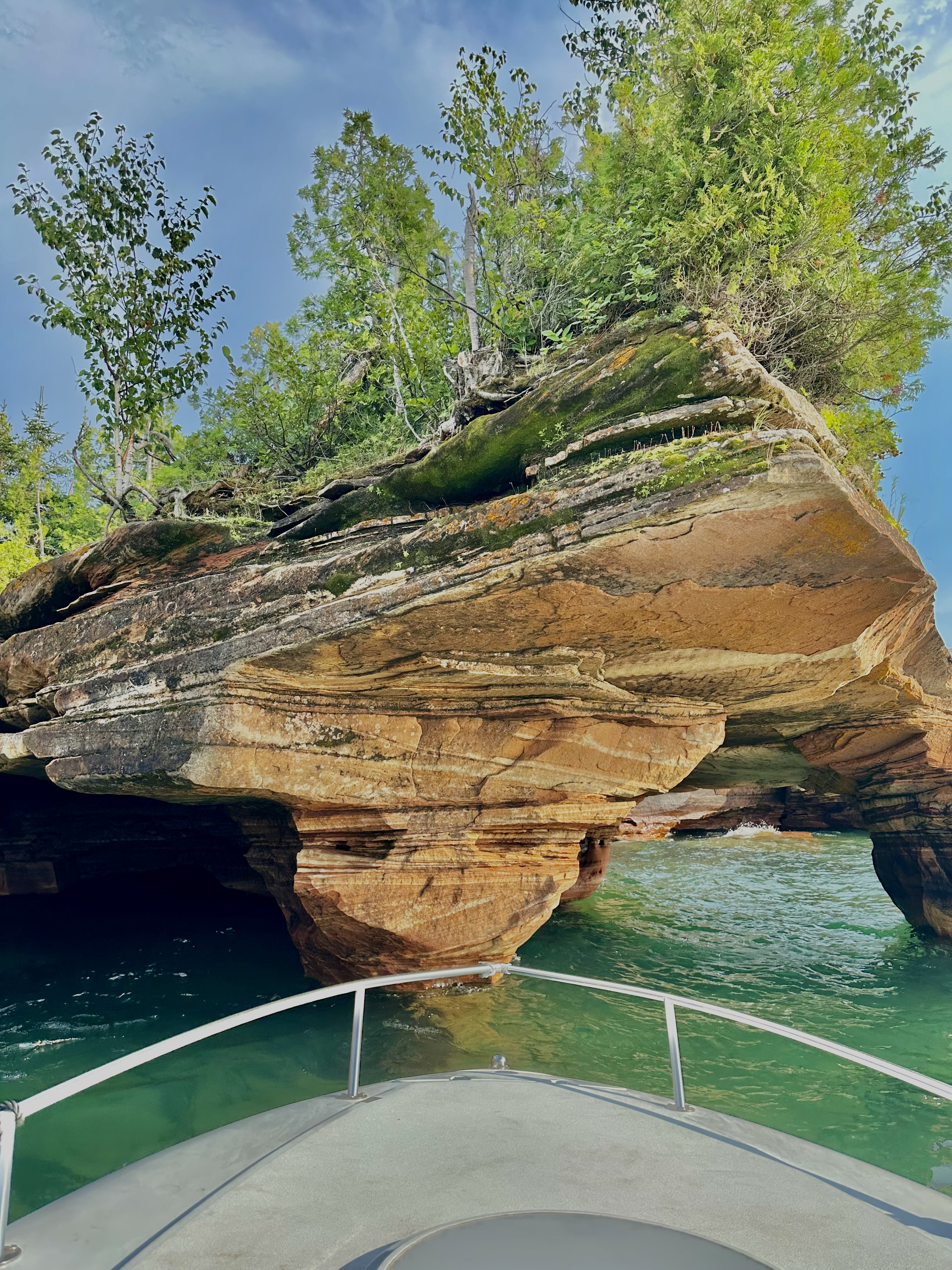
Devil's Island sea caves, taken from Lake Superior.

== History ==
=== Native American History ===
Indigenous peoples used the Apostle Islands and surrounding Chequamegon Bay region for thousands of years before European contact. Archaeological evidence shows successive cultural traditions along Lake Superior’s southern shore, including Archaic and Woodland-era peoples who relied on fishing, hunting, and seasonal travel networks tied to the lake and inland waterways. Changing lake levels and shoreline erosion have obscured some early sites, but surviving evidence demonstrates long-term and repeated use of the islands and nearby mainland.

When French missionaries and traders reached western Lake Superior in the seventeenth century, they encountered a region inhabited by multiple Indigenous groups. Historical accounts describe Huron and Ottawa communities living in or passing through the Chequamegon Bay area, many of whom had been displaced westward by conflict and upheaval associated with the Iroquois Wars. Over time, these groups moved elsewhere or were absorbed into other communities, while the Ojibwe (Anishinaabe) became the dominant Indigenous presence along the south shore of Lake Superior.

Ojibwe tradition describes a long migration from an eastern homeland near the Atlantic Ocean or Gulf of St. Lawrence. Guided by the sacred megis (seashell), ancestral groups traveled westward along interconnected waterways over many generations. According to traditions recorded in the nineteenth century by the pioneering historian William W. Warren, the megis appeared repeatedly at significant stopping places, finally revealing itself for the final time at Mooningwanekaaning (Madeline Island), where it "reflected back the rays of the sun, and blessed our ancestors with life, light, and wisdom. Its rays reach the remotest village of the widespread Ojibways."

Historical and archaeological research suggests that the Ojibwe expansion into the western Great Lakes occurred gradually rather than as a single migration event, but scholars generally view the migration tradition as a central expression of Ojibwe identity and cultural memory. By the late seventeenth century, Chequamegon Bay and Madeline Island had become important centers of Ojibwe life, serving as gathering places for trade, diplomacy, and seasonal movement.

The strategic geography of the Apostle Islands region helped shape this role. Protected harbors, abundant fisheries, nearby wild rice beds, and access to major travel routes allowed Ojibwe communities to act as intermediaries in regional exchange networks. When French traders entered the area, they relied heavily on existing Indigenous knowledge and relationships. The later prominence of Chequamegon Bay in the fur trade grew from these established Ojibwe networks rather than from European initiative alone.

Oral histories and historical accounts also describe periods of conflict with neighboring peoples, including encounters with Dakota groups to the west and Iroquois incursions from the east. Traditions recalling battles at locations such as Point Iroquois, the Brule River, and Chequamegon Point reflect the strategic importance of the Lake Superior shoreline. Despite these conflicts, the region remained a center of Ojibwe cultural and political life into the nineteenth century. Among the most influential leaders associated with the area was Chief Buffalo (Bizhiki), whose leadership helped sustain Ojibwe presence in the Chequamegon region during a period of intense change and negotiation.

=== Exploration and early contact ===
European knowledge of the Apostle Islands developed gradually during the eighteenth century and was shaped as much by secondhand reports and cartographic transmission as by direct observation. Although French explorers, missionaries, and fur traders traveled widely throughout the western Great Lakes, early written accounts of the Chequamegon Bay region often relied on information gathered indirectly from Indigenous informants and voyageurs rather than firsthand visits to the islands themselves.

Jesuit missionaries played a limited role in the early European presence in the Apostle Islands region. Although Jesuit missions were established elsewhere in Wisconsin for extended periods, their direct involvement in the Chequamegon Bay area spanned only about a decade, from the arrival of René Ménard in 1660 to the departure of Jacques Marquette in 1670. The enduring French influence in the region developed primarily through the activities of fur traders rather than missionaries, beginning with the explorations of Pierre-Esprit Radisson and Médard des Groseilliers and continuing through their successors in the western Great Lakes fur trade.

==== Origin of the Name "Apostle Islands" ====
The origin of the archipelago’s name has long been subject to misunderstanding, with the claim frequently heard that early French explorers and mapmakers believed there were only twelve islands, thus giving rise to the Apostles comparison. Careful examination of early accounts reveal no evidence to support this contention. The name "Apostle Islands" first appears in published form on a map by French cartographer Jacques-Nicolas Bellin, included in the 1744 book Histoire et description générale de la Nouvelle-France by Jesuit historian Pierre François Xavier de Charlevoix. Charlevoix’s narrative describes a journey undertaken in 1720–1721 that did not include a visit to the archipelago, and the islands are not mentioned in the text itself. They do, however, appear on Bellin’s accompanying map, labeled "I. des 12 Apôtres" ("Islands of the Twelve Apostles").

More than three decades later, English explorer Jonathan Carver published an account of his travels in North America during 1766–1767. Although Carver traveled along the north and east shores of Lake Superior and did not approach the Apostle Islands, his published map adopted and altered Bellin’s terminology, rendering the archipelago as the "Twelve Apostle Islands." This subtle shift transformed an ambiguous descriptive phrase into a specific and inaccurate numerical designation.

Carver’s usage strongly influenced later American writers. Participants in the 1820 expedition led by Lewis Cass, including geologist Henry Rowe Schoolcraft and future Wisconsin governor James Duane Doty, relied on Carver’s work and perpetuated the "twelve islands" formulation in their published accounts. Doty explicitly referred to the group as "the Twelve Apostles," extending the mistranslation and reinforcing the misconception.

By the early twentieth century, the erroneous interpretation had become widely accepted. Historian Milo Milton Quaife argued in 1917 that the name reflected a French belief that the archipelago contained twelve islands, despite acknowledging that Charlevoix himself never visited the area. More recent scholarship has rejected this explanation. Historian John Holzhueter concluded that the name "Apostle Islands" likely reflects a broader French habit of assigning religiously themed place names, without any intent to specify a precise number of islands.

=== European Expansion and the Fur Trade ===
The Apostle Islands and Chequamegon Bay region became an important center of the western Great Lakes fur trade during the seventeenth and eighteenth centuries. European demand for furs—particularly beaver pelts used in the manufacture of high-quality felt hats—drove the expansion of trade networks linking North America to global markets. French traders entering the Lake Superior region in the mid-seventeenth century built upon long-established Indigenous travel routes and exchange systems rather than creating entirely new ones. Ojibwe communities and other Indigenous groups remained central participants, supplying furs, guiding travel, and shaping diplomatic relationships that made trade possible.

Early French activity combined commercial, diplomatic, and religious goals. Missionaries such as René Ménard, Claude Allouez, and Jacques Marquette traveled through Chequamegon Bay alongside traders and voyageurs, encountering Huron, Ottawa, and Ojibwe communities whose movements had been shaped by earlier conflicts in the eastern Great Lakes. Independent traders, including figures such as Jean Baptiste Cadotte, established enduring relationships through kinship ties and alliances with Indigenous families, laying the foundations for long-term trading networks centered on Madeline Island and nearby mainland sites.

Following the British conquest of New France in 1763, control of the regional fur trade shifted to British merchants and companies. Although political authority changed, many French and Métis traders continued operating under British systems. Traders such as Alexander Henry described the region as an active crossroads linking Lake Superior to interior waterways and distant markets. British attempts to regulate trade and reduce established diplomatic practices, including gift-giving, disrupted Indigenous relationships and contributed to unrest during Pontiac’s War.

During the late eighteenth and early nineteenth centuries, large commercial enterprises such as the North West Company expanded trade throughout the western Great Lakes. La Pointe on Madeline Island emerged as a key supply and distribution post, associated especially with Michel Cadotte and his family, whose trading operations connected Ojibwe communities with Montreal-based merchants. Métis families played a critical role in this period, serving as intermediaries whose multilingual skills, kinship networks, and cultural knowledge facilitated trade across cultural boundaries.

The fur trade reshaped the economic and social landscape of Chequamegon Bay while remaining dependent on Indigenous participation. Ojibwe traders and hunters acted not only as suppliers but as partners whose diplomatic relationships governed access to territory and resources. Historians have described this system as a negotiated "middle ground," in which trade relied on mutual accommodation rather than unilateral control.

By the early nineteenth century, changing political conditions and evolving markets began to transform the fur trade in the Apostle Islands region. Although the Treaty of Paris (1783) placed the south shore of Lake Superior within the territory of the newly independent United States, commercial control of the regional fur trade remained largely in British hands for several decades, reflecting the continued dominance of Montreal-based trading networks and established Indigenous alliances. The War of 1812 marked a turning point in regional power dynamics, after which American companies, including the American Fur Company under leaders such as Ramsay Crooks, expanded their influence. At the same time, growing competition, declining beaver populations, and changing European fashions—particularly the declining demand for beaver felt hats—contributed to the gradual decline of the trade later in the nineteenth century.

=== Missionary activities ===
Jesuit missionaries were among the first Europeans to travel through the western Lake Superior region in the seventeenth century. Their work in the Chequamegon Bay area was brief: René Ménard, Claude Allouez, and Jacques Marquette visited or worked in the region during the 1660s, and Jesuit activity in the immediate Chequamegon Bay/Apostle Islands area largely lapsed for many decades afterward.

A sustained Protestant mission effort began much later, in the nineteenth century, primarily under the sponsorship of the American Board of Commissioners for Foreign Missions (ABCFM). Early Protestant involvement in the Chequamegon Bay region included short-term or exploratory work by several missionaries, including Frederick Ayer, who was invited by Lyman Warren but did not remain long. Prominent ABCFM-associated figures connected to the Lake Superior Ojibwe mission field included Sherman Hall and William T. Boutwell, whose work formed part of a broader network of Protestant missions among Ojibwe communities across the western Great Lakes.

One of the most influential Protestant missionaries in the Chequamegon region was Leonard H. Wheeler, who arrived at La Pointe in 1841 and later moved the mission to the Bad River area (Odanah). Wheeler and his family were closely involved with a period of intense transition that included growing U.S. political pressure, relocation debates, and the creation of reservation communities. He also traveled to advocate for Ojibwe interests in dealings with the federal government and worked to oppose removal efforts. Accounts from the Protestant mission record ongoing tension between missionary expectations—especially strict Sunday observance—and Ojibwe seasonal subsistence work such as maple sugaring, which did not always align with New England-style Sabbath norms.

By the mid- to late nineteenth century, Protestant mission work in the region declined and many mission efforts were abandoned or reorganized. Meanwhile, Catholic missionary work became increasingly prominent, and relationships between Protestant and Catholic missions were often strained, reflecting both doctrinal differences and competition for influence in Native communities.

Catholic missions in the Lake Superior region were strongly associated with the leadership of Bishop Frederic Baraga, a Slovenian-born priest known for extensive travel by canoe and snowshoe, linguistic work, and long-term ministry among Ojibwe and other communities in the Great Lakes. Later Catholic missionaries active in northern Wisconsin included figures such as Otto Skolla and Chrysostom Verwyst, who wrote widely on regional Catholic history and earlier Jesuit activities. Catholic and Protestant approaches to mission work often differed in practice as well as theology: Catholic missionaries were typically unmarried clergy who more readily adapted to local travel and living patterns, while Protestant missionaries commonly arrived with wives and families and attempted to establish mission stations modeled on Euro-American domestic and school settings.

Mission activity in the region was also shaped by U.S. treaty and federal policy. The Treaty of La Pointe (1854) explicitly permitted "missionaries" and "teachers" to reside on Ojibwe reservations and established terms under which they could obtain land, helping formalize the presence of mission institutions in reservation communities. In subsequent decades, denominational patterns became associated with specific communities—most notably the tendency for Bad River to be identified with Protestant missions and Red Cliff with Catholic missions—reflecting local history, mission placement, and community choices rather than any single cause.

=== Treaties and reservation era ===
European and American involvement in the western Lake Superior region reflected different colonial goals over time. French and British influence in the Great Lakes focused largely on trade and resource extraction—especially furs—while maintaining diplomatic alliances that depended on Indigenous cooperation. After the American Revolution, U.S. policy increasingly combined commercial interests with a strong emphasis on acquiring land for settlement and development, a shift that intensified pressure on Ojibwe communities during the nineteenth century.

As fur resources declined and trade patterns changed, Ojibwe communities faced mounting economic disruption. The collapse of the fur trade reduced access to goods and credit that had become embedded in regional exchange, while U.S. officials and private interests increasingly viewed Ojibwe homelands as available for settlement, logging, mining, and other development. These pressures formed the backdrop for a series of land-cession treaties and escalating efforts to concentrate Ojibwe communities on reservations or remove them from the Lake Superior south shore.

The Lake Superior Ojibwe entered into major treaties with the United States in 1837 and 1842 that ceded large territories while securing annuity payments and other provisions. The location and timing of annuity distributions became a central point of conflict. In 1850, removal advocates tied to Minnesota Territory sought to relocate Lake Superior Ojibwe communities westward by moving the annuity payment site from La Pointe to Sandy Lake on the Mississippi. In 1850, this coercive policy culminated in the Sandy Lake Tragedy, in which delayed payments, inadequate supplies, and exposure during the return journey contributed to the deaths of roughly 400 Ojibwe people.

Individuals associated with the attempt to move annuity payments and promote removal included John S. Watrous (U.S. sub-agent at La Pointe) and Minnesota political and commercial leaders who believed the policy would redirect Ojibwe annuity spending into Minnesota markets. Historian accounts note that territorial delegate (later senator) Henry M. Rice advocated shifting payments to Sandy Lake, a change that aligned with broader Minnesota territorial interests in removal and economic development.

Ojibwe leaders—including Chief Buffalo (Bizhiki) and others from the Lake Superior bands—organized petitions and delegations to oppose removal, including trips to Washington to seek redress and secure commitments to remain in their homeland. These efforts helped bring an end to the Sandy Lake removal policy and shaped the negotiations that followed.

A new agreement at La Pointe in 1854 established permanent reservations for Lake Superior Ojibwe communities in Wisconsin and elsewhere and provided for local annuity payments and services within the homeland. This treaty framework contributed directly to the creation and development of reservation communities including Bad River and Red Cliff in northern Wisconsin. Treaty provisions continued to shape the region long after the reservation era began. Ojibwe leaders maintained that the 1837 and 1842 treaties reserved continuing rights to hunt, fish, and gather in ceded territories. In the late twentieth century, these claims became the focus of major legal disputes in Wisconsin and Minnesota. In Wisconsin, the federal appellate ruling commonly known as the Voigt Decision (1983) affirmed that treaty-reserved usufructuary rights had not been extinguished. In Minnesota, treaty-rights litigation concerning the 1837 ceded territory culminated in a 1999 U.S. Supreme Court decision affirming the continued validity of those rights for signatory bands.

=== Commercial Fishing ===
Efforts to establish a commercial fishery in the Apostle Islands region began during the early nineteenth century, including attempts associated with the American Fur Company. These early ventures sought to diversify the regional economy as fur resources declined, but met with limited success. Difficult access to distant markets prior to the opening of the Soo Locks, a shortage of experienced commercial fishermen, and the logistical challenges of preserving fish for transport—typically through salting and barreling—restricted the scale and profitability of early operations.

Commercial fishing expanded more rapidly after the Civil War, driven by improvements in transportation and the arrival of experienced fishing communities. The opening of the Soo Locks in 1855 facilitated large-scale movement between Lake Superior and eastern markets, while later railroad connections linked Chequamegon Bay to growing Midwestern cities. Canadian fishermen, including members of the Boutin family, established fishing practices that helped create a functioning commercial fishery almost immediately. Norwegian immigrants also played an important role, bringing maritime and fishing expertise that supported the growth of the industry along the south shore of Lake Superior.

By the late nineteenth and early twentieth centuries, large fishing companies dominated regional production. Firms such as Booth Fisheries and operators including Otto Kuehn established networks that supplied equipment, credit, and market access to individual fishermen. These arrangements enabled rapid expansion but also created economic dependency, tying independent fishermen to corporate distribution systems and fluctuating market conditions.

The commercial fishery declined during the twentieth century as ecological and economic pressures intensified. Overfishing reduced stocks of key species, and the arrival of invasive sea lamprey in the mid-twentieth century caused severe disruptions to Lake Superior fisheries. Changing consumer preferences, regulatory shifts, and competition from other food industries further contributed to the industry’s contraction.

Efforts to stabilize and revive the fishery followed World War II through improved management practices, scientific monitoring, and regulatory cooperation among state, federal, and tribal authorities. Treaty rights affirmed for Ojibwe communities also reshaped the modern fishery, and today a significant portion of commercial fishing activity in the Apostle Islands region is conducted by fishermen operating under tribal licenses.

=== Logging the Islands ===
Logging in the Apostle Islands developed in successive phases during the late nineteenth and early twentieth centuries, reflecting changing market demands, evolving technology, and shifting availability of timber species. Early activity focused on supplying fuel wood for steam-powered vessels operating on Lake Superior. Oak Island, in particular, became an important source of cordwood harvested to supply passing steamboats during the expansion of commercial shipping on the Great Lakes.

As regional logging expanded, attention turned to valuable pine stands, which drove larger-scale operations across several islands. Companies and operators including Knight & Vilas and R. D. Pike established logging camps and cutting operations that integrated the islands into the broader Lake Superior lumber frontier. Harvesting required extensive logistical planning due to the islands’ isolation, and crews relied on seasonal ice roads, barges, and lake transport to move timber to mainland mills and markets.

Later phases emphasized hardwood species as pine resources declined and market demand shifted. Companies such as the John Schroeder Lumber Company operated large-scale camps, including prominent installations on Outer Island. These operations supported substantial workforces and required provisioning strategies adapted to remote conditions, including maintaining herds of cattle on certain islands to supply fresh meat to logging crews.

Technological change shaped logging methods over time. Early cutting relied primarily on manual labor supported by draft animals, but steam-powered equipment later increased productivity and expanded the scale of operations. By the early twentieth century, internal combustion engines and mechanized transport further transformed logging practices. On Michigan and Outer Island, the Schroeder Company constructed temporary railroads to move timber efficiently from interior cutting areas to shoreline loading points. These narrow-gauge logging lines allowed crews to extract timber from otherwise inaccessible stands and reflected the increasing industrialization of island logging. Tracks were laid quickly using lightweight materials and relocated as cutting progressed, demonstrating the flexible and mobile character typical of lumber rail systems in the Lake Superior region.

Specialized markets also influenced the final stages of island logging. Veneer production, including operations associated with companies such as the Lullabye Furniture Company, targeted specific hardwood species suitable for manufacturing. The Lullabye Company became known for innovative approaches in their operation, most notably the "flying lumberjacks" of Outer Island, who traveled to and from their remote camp in winter using small aircraft.

By the mid-twentieth century, commercially viable timber stands on the islands had been largely exhausted or protected, and large-scale logging operations declined. The legacy of logging remains visible today in altered forest composition, abandoned camp sites, and remnants of logging infrastructure that testify to a dynamic period of industrial activity in the Apostle Islands landscape.

=== Agriculture on the Islands ===
Agriculture in the Apostle Islands developed during the late nineteenth century as settlers filed homestead claims on the islands, lured by reports of a long growing season and breathless claims of prodigious success passed along by credulous area newspapers. These efforts produced a brief period of agricultural expansion, but most farms proved difficult to sustain due to thin soils, short growing seasons, and most importantly, the logistical costs of running a farm operation on a remote island.

Most of these farms were abandoned well before the turn of the twentieth century, but exceptions were found on Basswood and Sand Islands, where a handful survived into the 1920s and 1940s respectively. On Sand Island in particular, the largely Norwegian immigrant population found conditions well-suited to a traditional lifestyle that combined both farming and fishing as a strategy to diversify income and reduce the risk of food shortages.

One agricultural venture stands out from the others: the apple orchard on Michigan Island planted by the lighthouse keeper Roswell Pendergast. As one historian notes, "No single person was more important in the early horticultural development of …. the entire archipelago than lighthouse keeper Roswell H. Pendergast." Pendergast eventually gave up his lighthouse career to become a successful fruit grower and horticulturalist elsewhere, but the apple trees in the restored orchard on the light station grounds serve today as a reminder of what once was there.

=== The Quarrying Industry ===
During the late nineteenth century, brown sandstone quarrying briefly emerged as a significant economic activity in the Apostle Islands, leaving a visible imprint on the landscape and on urban architecture across the Upper Midwest. Quarrying in the islands began in 1870 and continued intermittently until the closing years of the century, with no single operation lasting more than a few years. The industry’s short lifespan reflected its sensitivity to national economic cycles and shifting architectural tastes.

The sandstone underlying the Apostle Islands is part of a narrow geological band extending inland from Lake Superior. This fine-grained brown sandstone proved well suited to cutting into large blocks, making it a desirable building material during a period when stone construction was favored for public and commercial buildings. In particular, the stone’s color and workability made it compatible with the Romanesque Revival style popularized by architect Henry Hobson Richardson, whose influence spread widely across Midwestern cities in the late nineteenth century.

The first of the islands’ quarries was established in 1870 by Milwaukee entrepreneur Alanson Sweet to provide building material for the city’s new courthouse. The success of this project brought attention to the stone’s commercial potential, while several additional factors contributed to growing demand. Rapid urban growth throughout the Midwest created a market for durable building materials, while devastating urban fires—most notably the Chicago Fire of 1871—encouraged the construction of fire-resistant structures using stone rather than wood. Courthouses, churches, commercial blocks, and institutional buildings across cities such as Milwaukee, Chicago, Minneapolis, St. Paul, Detroit, and Cleveland incorporated brownstone from the Chequamegon Bay region during this period.

Quarrying operations were established on Basswood, Stockton, and Hermit Islands, as well as several mainland sites. At their peak, the island quarries employed dozens of workers and supported small, short-lived communities that included families as well as single laborers. Quarry technology ranged from hand drilling and animal-powered hoists to steam-powered equipment, reflecting both experimentation and the logistical challenges of operating in remote island locations.

The industry declined rapidly after the Panic of 1893, which sharply curtailed construction nationwide and eliminated demand for building stone. Although economic conditions improved later in the decade, architectural fashion had shifted away from dark brownstone toward lighter stone, brick, and new materials such as steel and concrete. The neoclassical ideals popularized by the World’s Columbian Exposition held in Chicago in 1893 further accelerated this change. By the end of the nineteenth century, quarrying in the Apostle Islands had effectively ceased, marking the end of the region’s brief but influential brownstone era.

== Islands ==
All islands lie in the Town of La Pointe, in Ashland County, unless indicated otherwise.

Name	Size (Acres)	Notes
Madeline Island	15359.45 Acres	"Mooniingwanekaaning", Largest, inhabited, & not part of the Apostle Islands National Lakeshore.
Stockton Island	9892.46 Acres	"Wiisaakodewan"
Gull Island	3.51 Acres	"Gayaashko", The smallest island
Eagle Island	27.7 Acres	"Naabikwaani", Westernmost; in Town of Bayfield, Bayfield County
Outer Island	7860.88 Acres	"Gichi-ishkwaayaan", Easternmost and northernmost, site of Outer Island Lighthouse
Oak Island	5024.09 Acres	"Mitigominikaani"
Sand Island	2859.33 Acres	"Waabaabikaa", In Town of Bayfield, Bayfield County, site of Sand Island Lighthouse
Basswood Island	1914.28 Acres	"Wiigobiish"
Bear Island	1814.03 Acres	"Makwa"
Michigan Island	1538.74 Acres	"Bagidaabii", Site of Michigan Island Lighthouse
Hermit Island	787.60 Acres	"Eshkwegwindeg"
Cat Island	1339.07 Acres	"Gaagaagiwanzhiikaag"
Otter Island	1322.68 Acres	"Anweshin-nigig"
Manitou Island	1325.20 Acres	"Manidoo"
Rocky Island	1049.32 Acres	"Ziinzibaakwado"
Long Island	308.7 Acres	"Zaagawaamikong", Southernmost; not geologically part of the Apostle Islands, but rather an extension of Chequamegon Point; in Town of Sanborn, Ashland County
Ironwood Island	666.05 Acres	"Gaa-maananoonsi"
York Island	273.83 Acres	"Miskwaabiimizhikaag", In Town of Russell, Bayfield County
Raspberry Island	287.6 Acres	"Miskominikaani", In Town of Russell, Bayfield County, site of Raspberry Island Lighthouse
Devils Island	310.28 Acres	"Maji-manidoo", Site of Devils Island Lighthouse
South Twin Island	336.37 Acres	"Waaboozo"
North Twin Island	165.7 Acres	"Miskwasinikaag"

== Climate ==
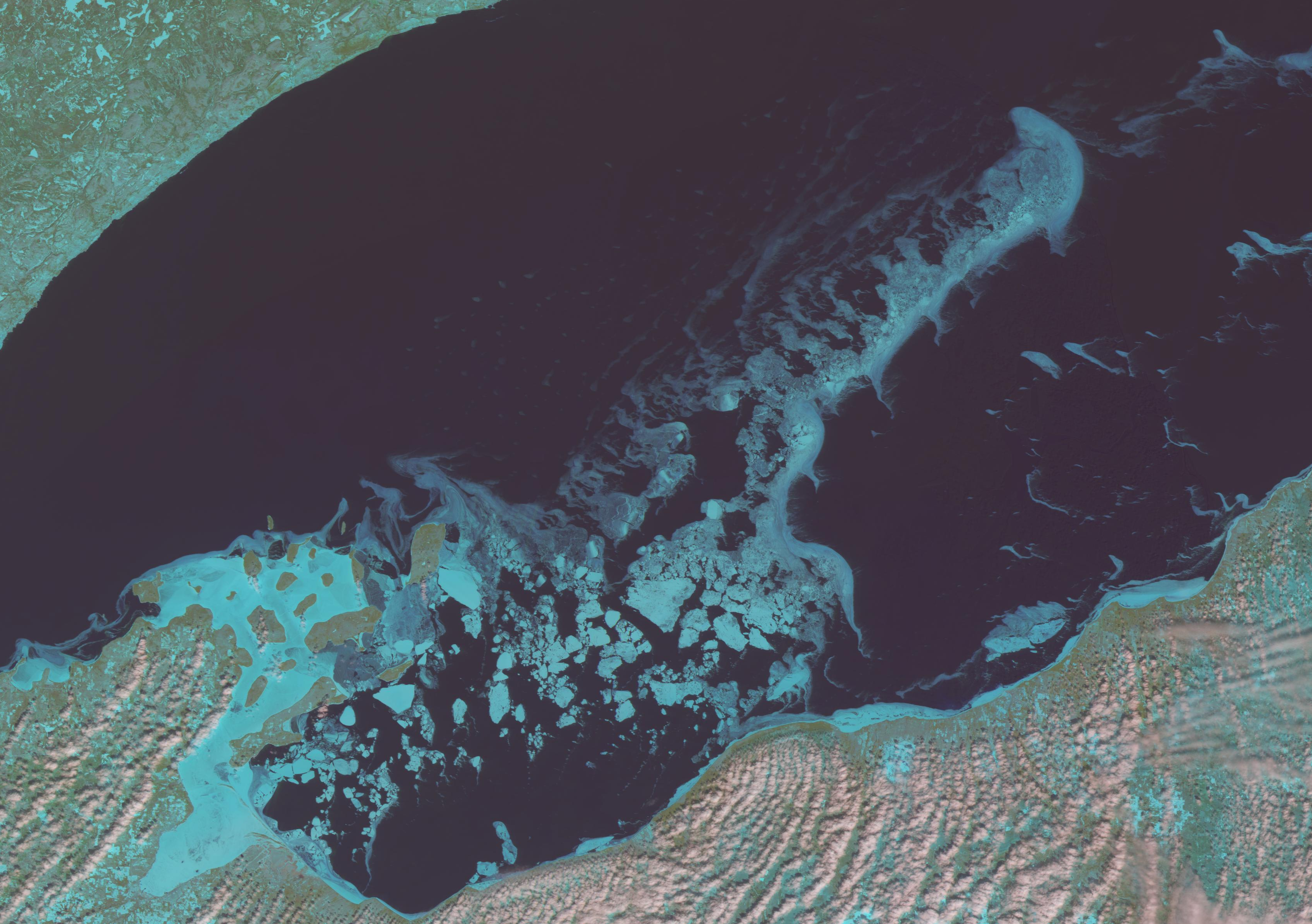
Taken by Resourcesat-2 on March 24, 2022

Apostle Islands

Climate chart (precipitation, max. and min. temperature)
J	F	M	A	M	J	J	A	S	O	N	D
69 −11 −16	74 −12 −17	64 −2 −7	86 3 −2	163 6 2	147 13 9	100 18 15	142 16 13	87 16 13	86 9 7	93 4 4	77 −2 −6
- █ Average max. and min. temperatures in °C
- █ Precipitation totals in mm
Imperial conversion
J	F	M	A	M	J	J	A	S	O	N	D
2.7 12 3	2.9 10 1	2.5 28 19	3.4 37 28	6.4 43 36	5.8 55 48	3.9 64 59	5.6 61 55	3.4 61 55	3.4 48 45	3.7 39 39	3 28 21
- █ Average max. and min. temperatures in °F
- █ Precipitation totals in inches

== See also ==
- Apostle Islands Lighthouses
- Apostle Islands National Lakeshore
- La Pointe, Wisconsin
- La Pointe (community), Wisconsin
- Big Bay State Park
- Islands of the Midwest
- List of islands of the United States
- Islands of the Great Lakes
- Populated islands of the Great Lakes
- Kechewaishke
