= Gull Island (Wisconsin) =

Island in Wisconsin, United States

Coordinates: 46°54′25″N 090°26′33″W

Gull Island is one of the Apostle Islands of Lake Superior in northern Wisconsin, and is part of the Apostle Islands National Lakeshore. It is a small, flat, three-acre island off the coast of Michigan Island. Along with Eagle Island, Gull Island is closed to visitors to allow colonies of birds to nest. The island is also an important spawning site for fish.

The Gull Island Light is on Gull Island.
