= Hermit Island (Wisconsin) =

Island in Wisconsin, United States

Coordinates: 46°53′12″N 090°41′07″W

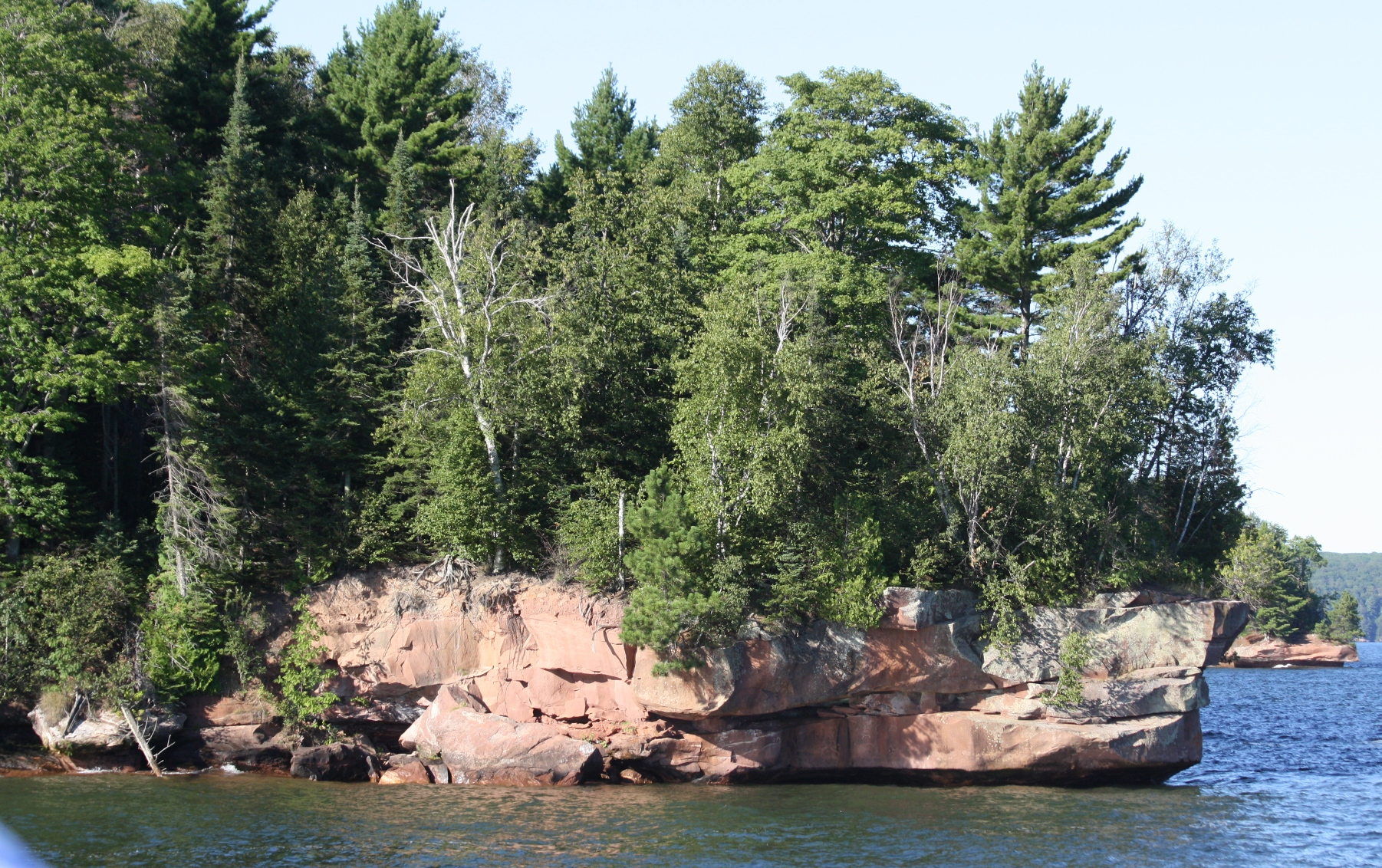
Former location of Prentiss Lodge on Hermit Island

Hermit Island is a Wisconsin island in Lake Superior and a part of the Apostle Islands. Along with most of the islands in the group, it is a part of the Apostle Islands National Lakeshore. It was named after a hermit who, according to folk tales, lived on the island from the late 1840s to 1861.

Hermit Island was home to a number of quarries for its brownstone from the 1860s to the 1890s.

Hermit Island has gone by other names in its history, including "Ashuwaguindag Miniss" (Ojibwe for "The Further Island"), Illinois Island, Austrian Island, Wilson's Island and Askew Island.

It is nearly 2 nautical miles (4 km) long, lying 2 nautical miles (4 km) west of the northern tip of Madeline Island.
