= Major Gilbert Field Airport =

Airport in Wisconsin, United States

Major Gilbert Field Airport Madeline Island Airport
- IATA: none; ICAO: none; FAA LID: 4R5

Summary
- Airport type: Public
- Owner: Town of La Pointe
- Serves: La Pointe, Wisconsin
- Opened: August 1949
- Time zone: CST (UTC−06:00)
  - Summer (DST): CDT (UTC−05:00)
- Elevation AMSL: 649 ft (198 m)
- Coordinates: 46°47′19″N 090°45′31″W
- Website: www.townoflapointewi.gov/airport

Map
- Location of airport in Wisconsin 4R5 (the United States)

Runways
Direction	Length		Surface
Direction	ft	m	Surface
4/22	3,000	914	Asphalt

Statistics
- Aircraft operations (2022): 6,050
- Based aircraft (2024): 1
- Source: Federal Aviation Administration

Major Gilbert Field Airport, also known as Madeline Island Airport, (FAA LID: 4R5) is a town-owned public use airport located 2 miles (3 km) northeast of the central business district of La Pointe, Wisconsin, a town in Ashland County, Wisconsin, United States. It is named in honor of Major Gordon E. Gilbert, who served in the 554th Fighter-Bomber Squadron in WWII. The airport is included in the Federal Aviation Administration (FAA) National Plan of Integrated Airport Systems for 2025–2029, in which it is categorized as a basic general aviation facility.

Although most airports in the United States use the same three-letter location identifier for the FAA and International Air Transport Association (IATA), this airport is assigned 4R5 by the FAA but has no designation from the IATA.

== Facilities and aircraft ==
Major Gilbert Field Airport covers an area of 136 acres (55 ha) at an elevation of 649 feet (198 m) above mean sea level. It has one runway: 4/22 which is 3,000 by 75 feet (914 x 23 m) with an asphalt surface.

For the 12-month period ending August 23, 2022, the airport had 6,050 aircraft operations, an average of 17 per day: 99% general aviation and 1% air taxi. In July 2024, there was 1 aircraft based at this airport: 1 single-engine.

== See also ==
- List of airports in Wisconsin
