= Chequamegon Bay =

Inlet of Lake Superior in Wisconsin, US

Coordinates: 46°39′01″N 90°50′50″W

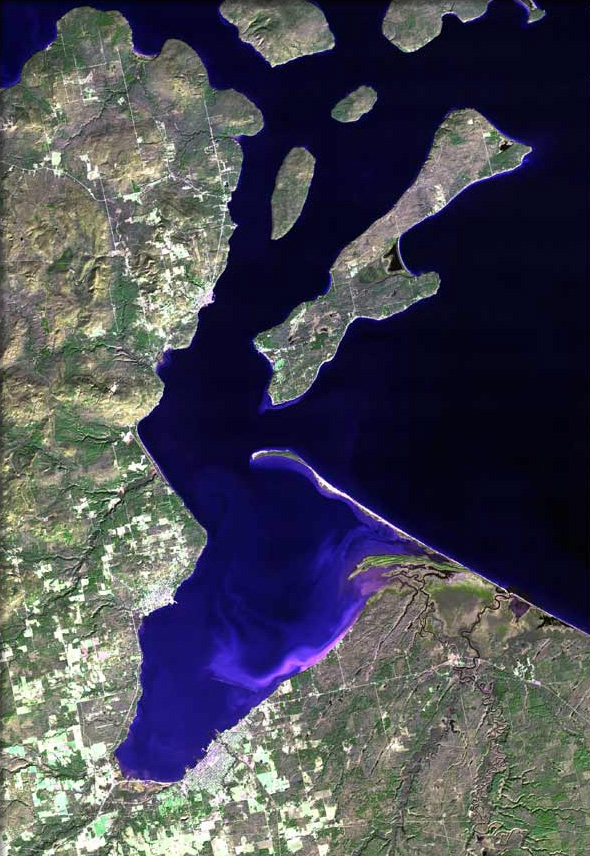
Satellite image of Chequamegon Bay

Chequamegon Bay (/ʃəˈwɑːməɡən/ shə-WAH-mə-gən) is an inlet of Lake Superior in Ashland and Bayfield counties in the extreme northern part of Wisconsin.

== History ==
A Native American village, known as Chequamegon, developed here in the mid-17th century. It was developed by refugee Petun, Huron, and Ottawa, who were fleeing the Beaver Wars and Iroquois invasions from the East after 1649. Later, Ojibwe people came here to trade, but they were not among the first settlers, according to archeological evidence.

The end of Chequamegon Bay is known as the site of the first dwelling in present-day Wisconsin to have been occupied by European men. Two French fur traders, Médard des Groseilliers and Pierre-Esprit Radisson, built a hut somewhere on the west shore of the bay, probably in 1658. Other traders dwelt on this bay in 1660-1663 and were visited in the spring of 1661 by Father René Menard, the first Jesuit missionary to the Northwest. In 1665 Father Claude Allouez built a mission house near the southwest end of the bay. His successor, Father Jacques Marquette, came in 1669 and remained for two years. In 1693 Pierre LeSueur built a fort on the largest island (now known as Madeline Island), located at the mouth of the bay. It was abandoned by the French before the close of the century.

In 1718 a French fort was built on the island where Louis Denis de la Ronde had a post for fur trading and exploration for copper mines. Called La Pointe, the fort had a French garrison until 1759, during the Seven Years' War (also known as the French and Indian War in North America). The first English trader to reach this distant post was Alexander Henry the elder, whose French partner, Jean Baptiste Cadotte, founded a permanent trading post at this place.

In 1818 two Massachusetts traders, Lyman and Truman Warren, came here. They married daughters of Michel Cadotte, a fur trader and a son of Jean Baptiste. He bequeathed his interests to the Warren brothers; they became the leading American fur traders of the region. Truman Warren died early; Lyman maintained his home at La Pointe until his death in 1847.

During the early 19th century, a village developed around the post, made up of retired voyageurs and fur traders. John Jacob Astor's American Fur Company had a post here for many years. The first Protestant mission in Wisconsin was founded here in 1831.

=== Name origin ===
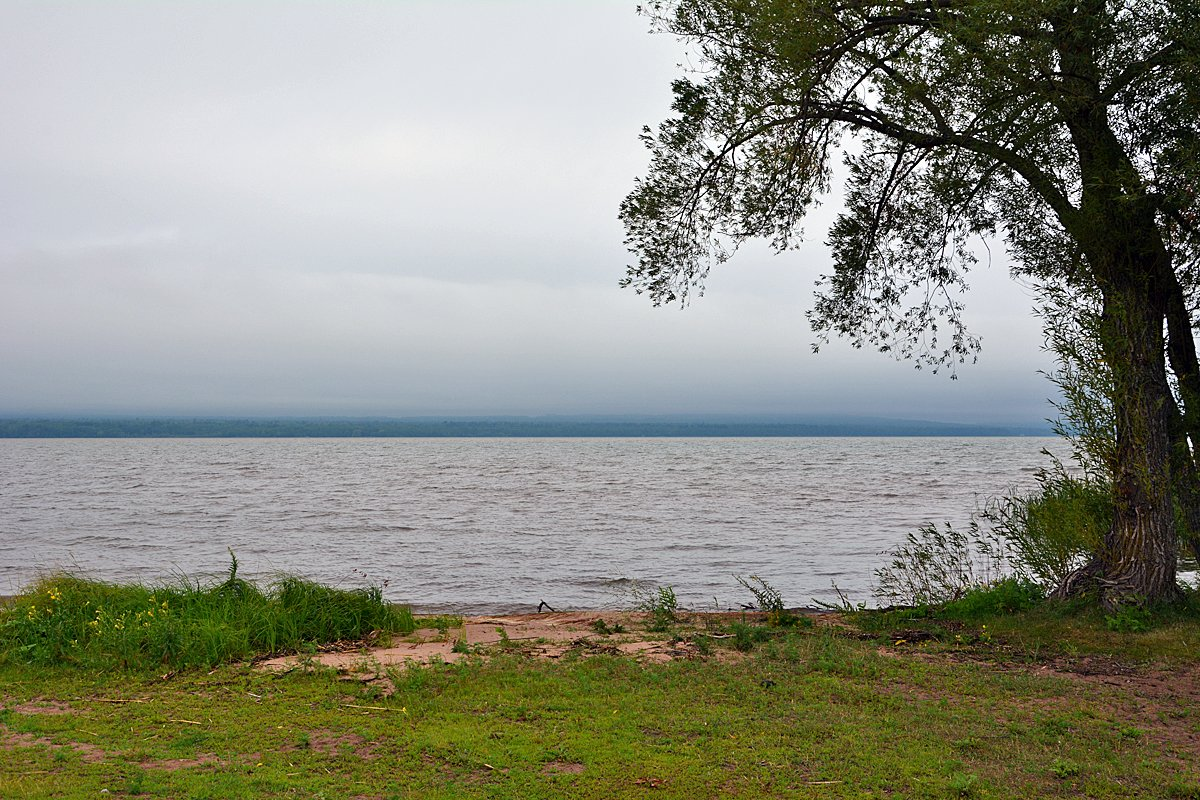
Chequamegon Bay near Ashland

The name Chequamegon is of Ojibwe origin. It is derived from chagaouamigoung, a French transliteration of the Ojibwe Zhaagawaamikong or jagawamikiong, meaning 'sand bar place; at the sand bar; strip of land running into a body of water'.

== Geography ==
Chequamegon Bay lies largely inside the barrier of Chequamegon Point and Long Island, with the Bad River Indian Reservation to the east. Ashland, Wisconsin is on its south and Washburn, Wisconsin is on its north. The 850,000 acres (3,440 km^{2}) Chequamegon National Forest lies largely to the south and west. The Ashland Harbor Breakwater Light, also known as the Ashland Breakwater Lighthouse, is an operational lighthouse located in the bay.
