= Ashland Harbor Breakwater Light =

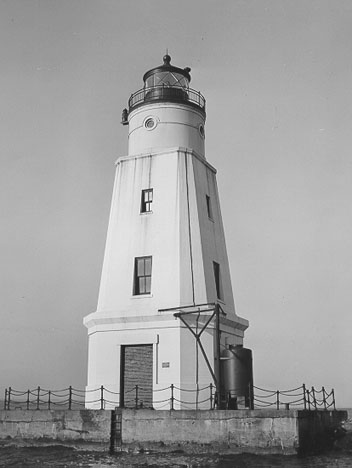
- Location: Ashland, Wisconsin
- Coordinates: 46°37′42″N 90°52′12″W

Tower
- Constructed: 1915
- Foundation: Concrete pier
- Construction: Reinforced concrete / steel
- Height: 58 feet (18 m)
- Shape: Cylindrical watch room on octagonal pyramid tower
- Markings: white with red cap on lantern
- Heritage: National Register of Historic Places listed place

Light
- First lit: 1915
- Focal height: 60 feet (18 m)
- Lens: Fourth order Fresnel lens (original), 9.8-inch (250 mm) acrylic plastic lens solar powered (current)
- Range: 9 nautical miles (17 km; 10 mi)
- Characteristic: White, Flashing, 6 sec
- Ashland Harbor Breakwater Light
- U.S. National Register of Historic Places
- Nearest city: Ashland, Wisconsin
- Area: less than one acre
- Architect: U.S. Bureau of Lighthouses; 11th District
- MPS: Light Stations of the United States MPS
- NRHP reference No.: 07000103
- Added to NRHP: March 1, 2007

The Ashland Harbor Breakwater lighthouse, also known as Ashland Breakwater Lighthouse, is an operational lighthouse located near Ashland in Ashland County, Wisconsin, USA. Located in Chequamegon Bay of Lake Superior, it is owned and managed by the National Park Service, and is a part of the Apostle Islands National Lakeshore. It sits at the end of a long and detached breakwater, which creates an artificial harbor.

A lighthouse keeper's quarters and a boathouse, constructed in 1916, are located about 2 miles (3.2 km) from the light. There are additional living quarters on the second and third stories of the lighthouse.

== Gallery ==
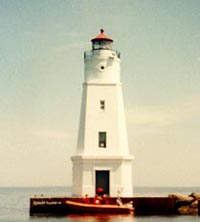
Ashland Lighthouse

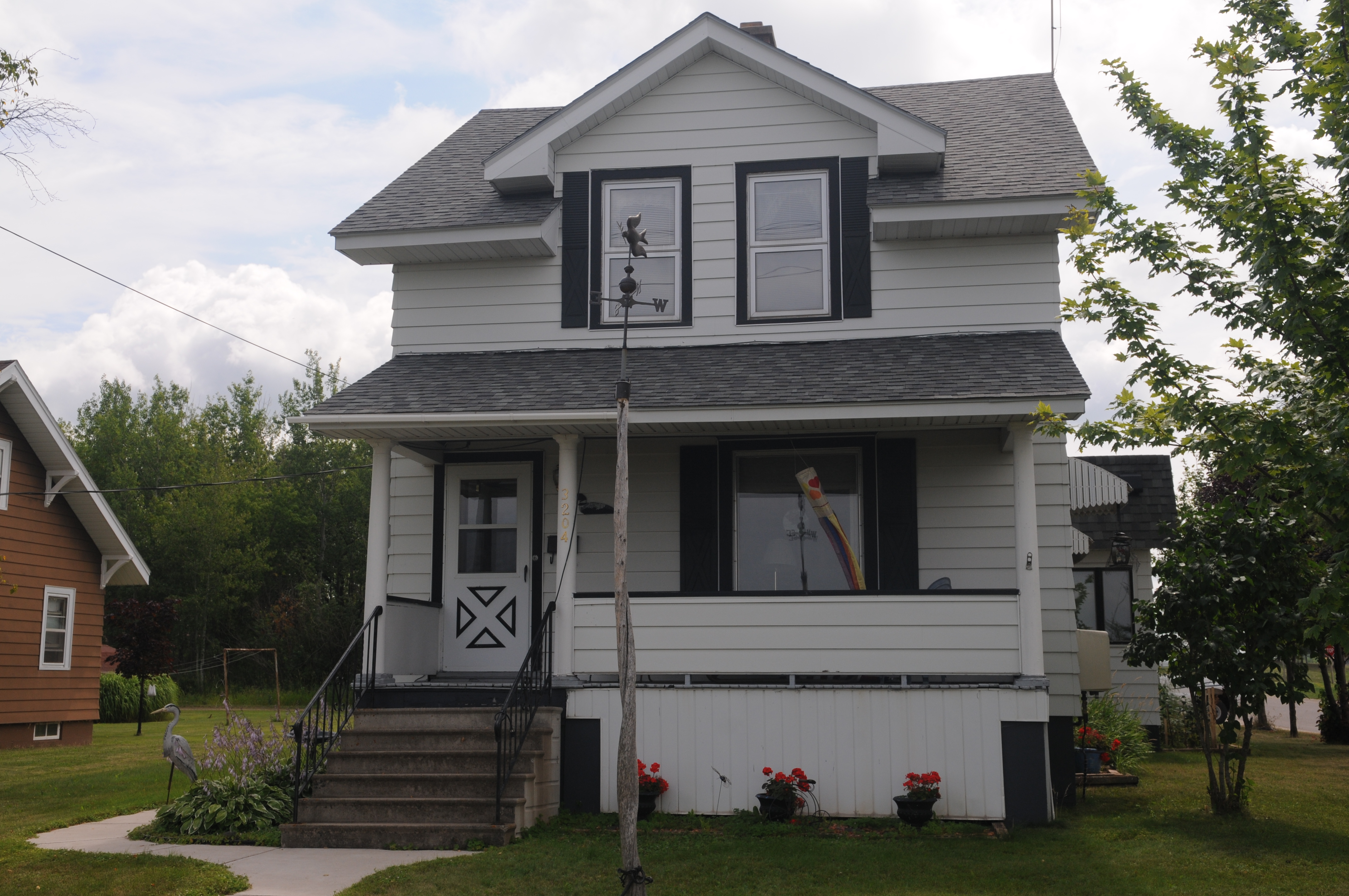
2008 Lightkeepers house

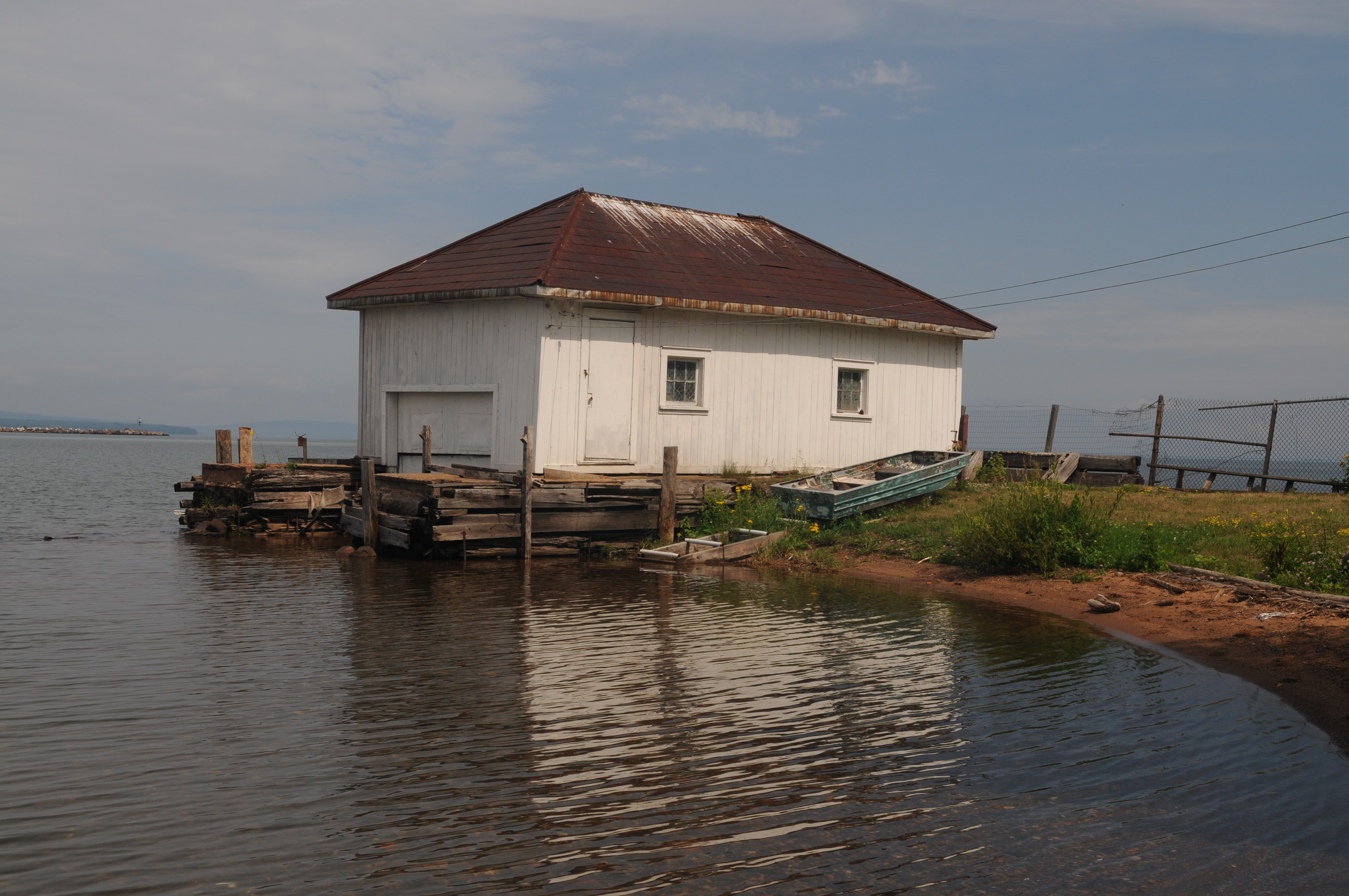
2008 Boathouse
