= Bayfield (town), Wisconsin =

Bayfield, Wisconsin
- Town
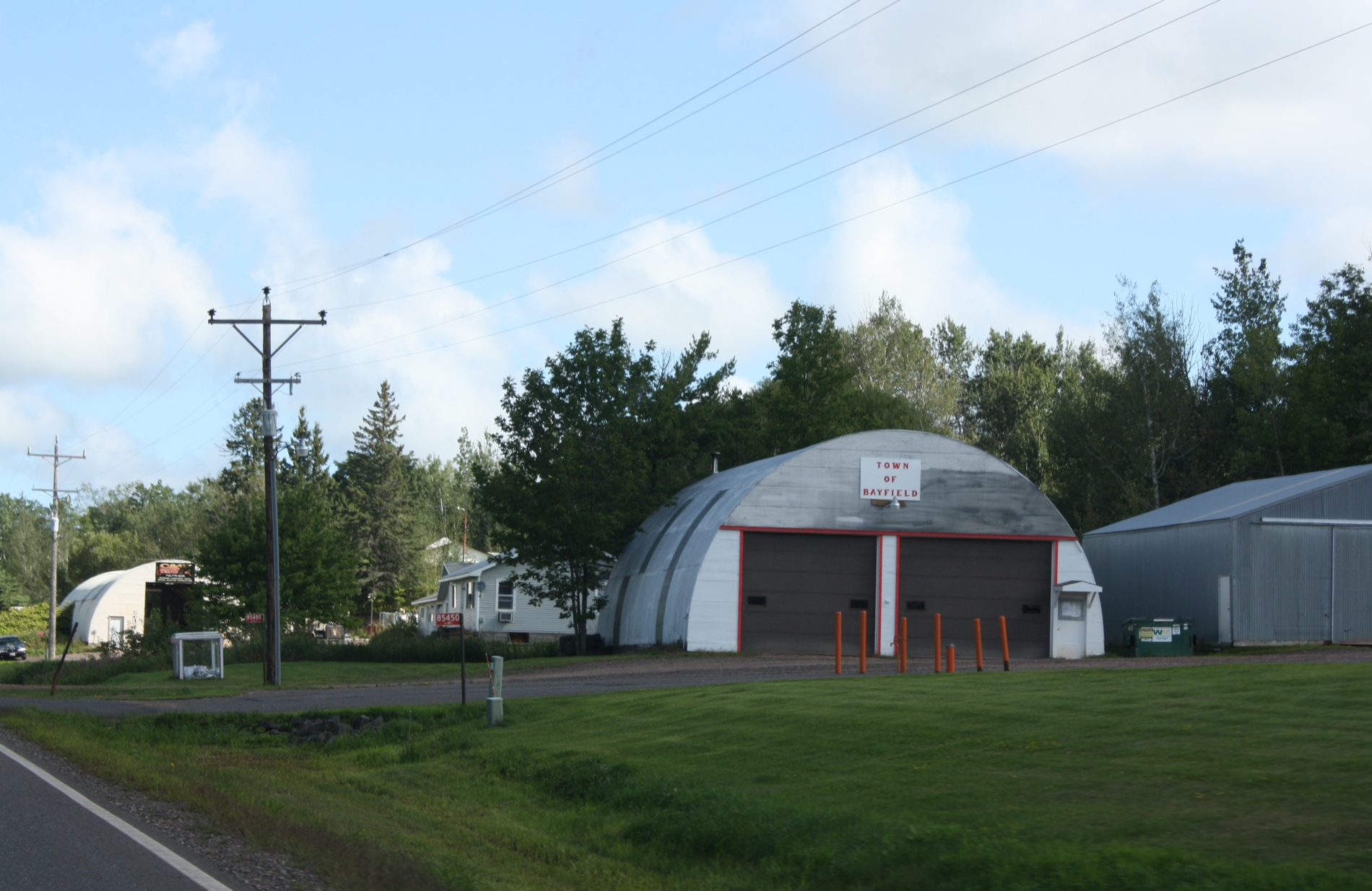
- Town garage

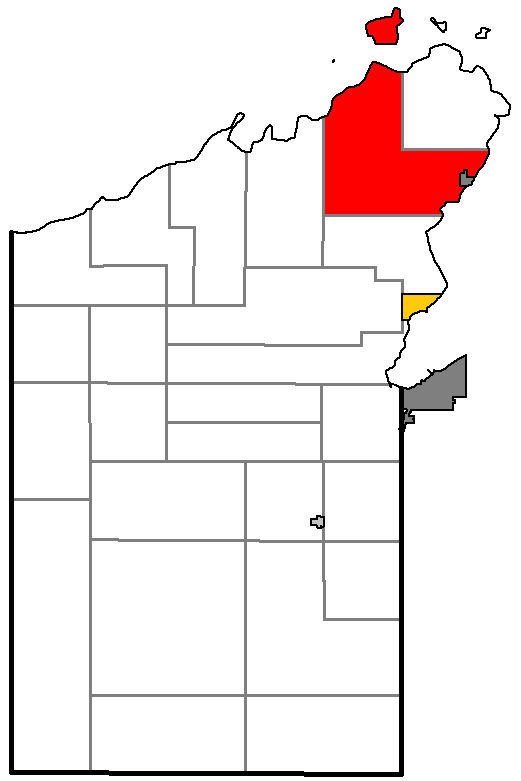
- Location of Bayfield, within Bayfield County
- Coordinates: 46°48′50″N 90°49′55″W
- Country: United States
- State: Wisconsin
- County: Bayfield

Area
  - Total: 134.0 sq mi (347.0 km^{2})
  - Land: 89.2 sq mi (230.9 km^{2})
  - Water: 44.8 sq mi (116.1 km^{2})
- Elevation: 843 ft (257 m)

Population (2020)
  - Total: 787
  - Density: 8.83/sq mi (3.41/km^{2})
- Time zone: UTC-6 (Central (CST))
  - Summer (DST): UTC-5 (CDT)
- Area codes: 715 & 534
- FIPS code: 55-05375
- GNIS feature ID: 1582765
- Website: townofbayfieldwi.gov

Bayfield is a town in Bayfield County, Wisconsin, United States. The population was 787 at the 2020 census, up from 680 at the 2010 census. The unincorporated communities of Pureair and Salmo are located in the town, as are Eagle Island and Sand Island of the Apostle Islands.

== Geography ==
According to the United States Census Bureau, the town has a total area of 134.0 square miles (347.0 km^{2}), of which 89.2 square miles (230.9 km^{2}) is land and 44.8 square miles (116.1 km^{2}), or 33.45%, is water.

The town of Bayfield has the shape of a capital "L", extending north into the main body of Lake Superior and east into a channel of the lake between the mainland and Madeline Island. The city of Bayfield is located on the shore of Lake Superior and is surrounded by the eastern leg of the town of Bayfield.

== Demographics ==
As of the census of 2000, there were 625 people, 261 households, and 194 families residing in the town. The population density was 7.0 people per square mile (2.7/km^{2}). There were 491 housing units at an average density of 5.5 per square mile (2.1/km^{2}). The racial makeup of the town was 79.52% White, 14.72% Native American, 0.16% Asian, 0.48% from other races, and 5.12% from two or more races. Hispanic or Latino of any race were 1.12% of the population.

There were 261 households, out of which 26.4% had children under the age of 18 living with them, 60.5% were married couples living together, 8.0% had a female householder with no husband present, and 25.3% were non-families. 18.8% of all households were made up of individuals, and 4.6% had someone living alone who was 65 years of age or older. The average household size was 2.38 and the average family size was 2.67.

In the town, the population was spread out, with 22.4% under the age of 18, 5.0% from 18 to 24, 23.7% from 25 to 44, 35.4% from 45 to 64, and 13.6% who were 65 years of age or older. The median age was 44 years. For every 100 females, there were 107.0 males. For every 100 females age 18 and over, there were 108.2 males.

The median income for a household in the town was $39,342, and the median income for a family was $42,750. Males had a median income of $33,750 versus $25,179 for females. The per capita income for the town was $17,890. About 6.6% of families and 9.1% of the population were below the poverty line, including 4.0% of those under age 18 and 8.1% of those age 65 or over.

== Transportation ==
Wisconsin Highway 13, County Road I, and County Road J are the main routes in the town of Bayfield.
