= Long Island (Wisconsin) =

Island in Lake Superior, Wisconsin, United States

Coordinates: 46°43′37″N 090°47′06″W

Long Island is an island in Lake Superior in Wisconsin, usually identified with the Apostle Islands. It is geologically different from the other islands, as it is just an extension of the spit off Chequamegon Point. The island is a part of the Apostle Islands National Lakeshore in the Town of Sanborn, in Ashland County, Wisconsin. It is 6.4 kilometres (4 miles) long and between 75 and 380 metres (82 and 416 yards) wide.

According to USGS GNIS, Wisconsin has five other islands with the same name.
