= Eagle Island (Wisconsin) =

Island in Wisconsin, United States

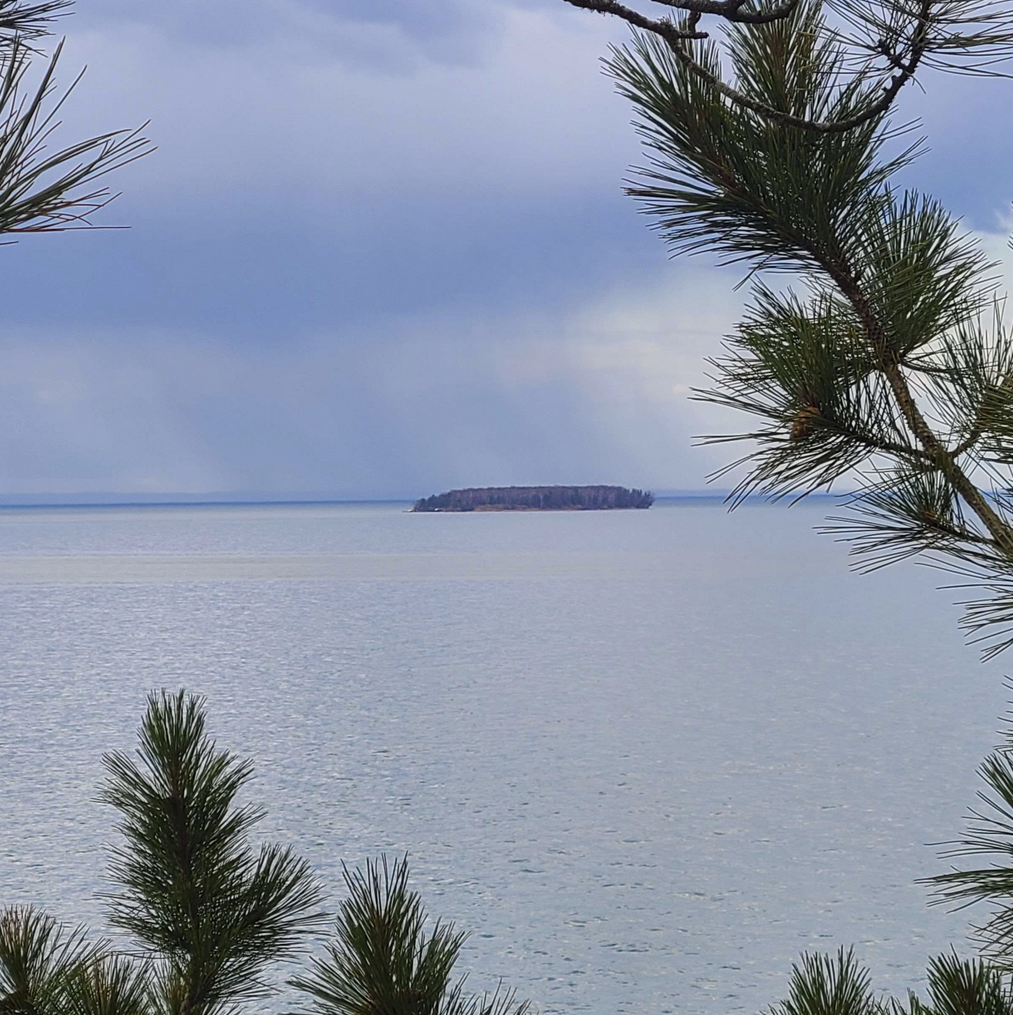
Eagle Island as viewed from Mawikwe Bay

Eagle Island, located in Lake Superior, is part of the Apostle Islands, and is located within the Apostle Islands National Lakeshore. Situated due north of the mainland sea caves and southwest of Sand Island, it is the second smallest and westernmost of the Apostle Islands, covering approximately 20 acres (8.1 hectares). Like Gull Island, Eagle Island serves as a bird rookery and sanctuary, providing important nesting habitat for species such as double-crested cormorants and herring gulls. Notably, it is the only island in the archipelago that serves as a nesting area for great blue herons.

The island is closed to public access to protect its fragile ecosystem. Researchers from the Great Lakes Inventory and Monitoring Network conduct annual studies on the bird populations inhabiting the island. In recognition of its ecological significance, Eagle Island, along with Gull Island, was designated a State Natural Area in 1992 and is part of the Apostle Islands National Lakeshore.
