= White cedar =

White cedar may refer to several different trees:

- Bignoniaceae
  - Tabebuia heterophylla - native to Caribbean islands and also cultivated as an ornamental tree
- Cupressaceae:
  - Chamaecyparis thyoides – Atlantic white cypress
  - Cupressus lusitanica – Mexican white cedar
  - Thuja occidentalis – Eastern arborvitae
- Meliaceae:
  - Melia azedarach – Chinaberry, commonly referred to as white cedar in Australia
