= Chequamegon Point =

Peninsula in northern Wisconsin, U.S.

Coordinates: 46°43′42″N 090°48′34″W

Chequamegon Point is a peninsula that extends into Chequamegon Bay of Lake Superior in northern Wisconsin, in the Town of Sanborn, in Ashland County, Wisconsin. Long Island is an extension of Chequamegon Point. Most of Chequamegon Point is owned by the Bad River Band of the Lake Superior Tribe of Chippewa Indians. There is a lighthouse on the point.
