= Big Bay State Park =

State park in Ashland County, Wisconsin

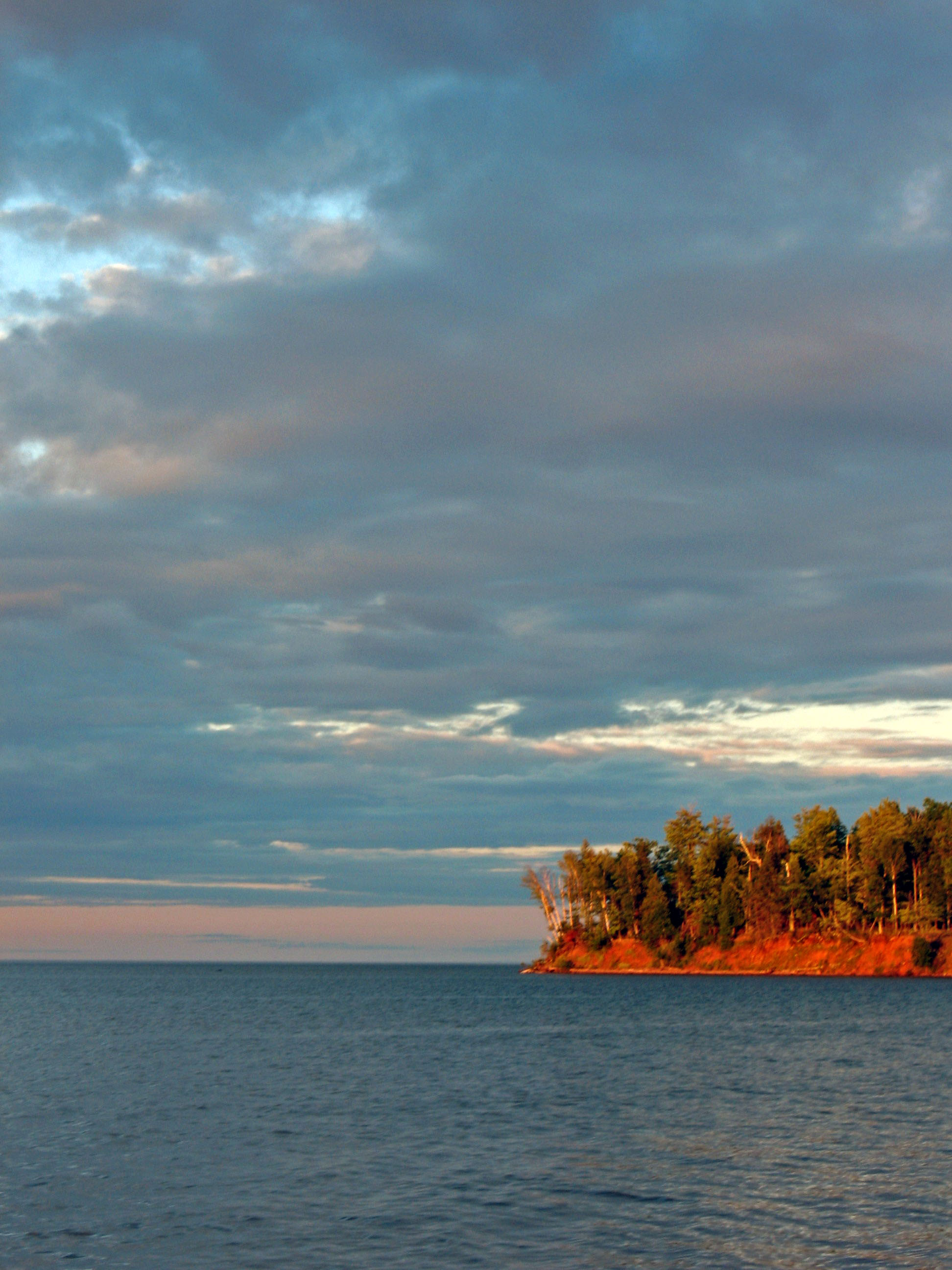

- Location within Wisconsin Location within the United States
- Interactive map of Big Bay State Park
- Location: Ashland County, Wisconsin, United States
- Coordinates: 46°48′0″N 90°40′22″W
- Area: 2,350 acres (950 ha)
- Elevation: 643 ft (196 m)
- Established: 1963
- Administrator: Wisconsin Department of Natural Resources
- Website: Official website
- Wisconsin State Parks

Big Bay State Park is a state park of Wisconsin, United States, on Madeline Island, the largest of 22 Apostle Islands in Lake Superior. The 2,350-acre (951 ha) park has picturesque sandstone bluffs and caves and a 1.5-mile-long (2.4 km) sand beach. It encloses unique habitat types including lakeside dunes, sphagnum bogs, and old-growth forest. Bald eagles return annually to the park to nest and rear offspring.

== Recreational features ==
The park offers picnicking, camping, and more than 9 miles (14 km) of trails, including nature trails. The park is open year-round, with winter visitation mostly limited to hunters, snowshoers, and cross-country skiers.

== Access ==
Reaching the park requires a 20-minute ferry ride from Bayfield, Wisconsin, and traveling approximately 5 miles (8.0 km) east on Highway H.

== Darkness ==
Big Bay State Park is 1 of 3 Wisconsin State Parks that one would have the best view the Milky Way from, in regards to available Wisconsin State Parks.
