= Michigan Island Light =

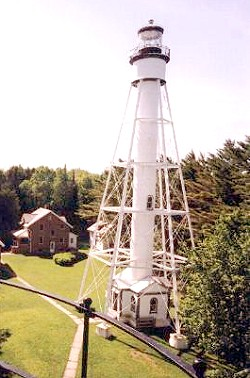
- The current tower
- Location: Michigan Island, Wisconsin
- Coordinates: 46°52′17.154″N 90°29′49.545″W

Tower
- Constructed: 1857
- Foundation: Concrete
- Construction: Steel
- Automated: 1943
- Height: 118 feet (36 m)
- Shape: White, Skeletal with a central column
- Heritage: National Register of Historic Places contributing property

Light
- First lit: 1869
- Focal height: 170 feet (52 m)
- Lens: Third and half order Fresnel lens (original), 12-inch (300 mm)Tideland Signal ML-300 Acrylic Optic (current)
- Range: 11 nautical miles (20 km; 13 mi)
- Characteristic: White, Flashing, 6 sec
- Michigan Island Light
- U.S. Historic district – Contributing property
- Area: 33.8 acres (13.7 ha)
- Built: 1857
- Built by: U.S. Lighthouse Service
- Part of: Apostle Islands Lighthouses (ID77000145)
- Designated CP: March 8, 1977

The Michigan Island Light Station is located on Michigan Island in western Lake Superior, within the Apostle Islands National Lakeshore. Two lighthouses stand on the grounds: the older tower, built in 1856, and its much taller successor, erected on the site in 1929. The latter remains in operation.

== History ==
The older of the two lighthouses that stand on Michigan Island was authorized by Congress in 1852, one of a group of eleven funded by Congress to promote navigation on the upper Great Lakes. Intended to guide mariners to the port of La Pointe on Madeline Island, plans called for the lighthouse to be built on low-lying Long Island, where it would be readily visible to ships approaching from the east. However, when construction began in the summer of 1856, Abraham Smolk, government representative on the scene, directed the builders to erect the lighthouse at the top of a bluff on Michigan Island, seventeen miles from the location initially planned. Construction was completed at the close of the 1856 shipping season, and the beacon was placed into service the following spring. However, when authorities in Washington became aware of the change in location, the lighthouse was taken out of service after only one year, then sat abandoned until it was reactivated in 1869.

Smolk’s decision would lead to consequences lasting for decades. Even at its clifftop location, the Michigan Island light was never fully satisfactory as a hazard marker. Its placement at the southern end of Michigan Island meant it was poorly positioned to warn ships away from nearby Gull Island and its surrounding shoals, leading to the loss of several ships over the years.

The situation was finally rectified in 1929, with the erection of a second, much taller tower adjacent to the original. This tower had actually been built at Schooner’s Ledge in Pennsylvania in 1881, serving as a range light on the Delaware River. Channel improvements eliminated the need for the light, so it was taken down in 1918, then shipped to Wisconsin for reassembly on Michigan Island. Lack of funding interfered with this plan and delayed its completion until 1929, when the cast-iron tower was finally placed into service.

The station remained staffed into the twentieth century and was fully automated in 1943.

In 1972, the original "third-and-a-half" order Fresnel lens was removed from the tower and replaced by an automated beacon. It is now on display at the visitor center of the Apostle Islands National Lakeshore in Bayfield.

== Status ==
Currently owned by the National Park Service and part of the Apostle Islands National Lakeshore, it is a contributing property of the Apostle Islands Lighthouses, added to the National Register of Historic Places in 1977. It is also listed in the Library of Congress, Historic American Buildings Survey, WI-317 (A-C).

== Transportation ==
Most of the Apostle Islands light stations can be reached on the Apostle Islands Cruise Service water taxi or by private boat during the summer. During the Annual Apostle Island Lighthouse Celebration, a ferry tour service is available for several of the lighthouses. During the tourist season, volunteer park rangers are on many of the islands to greet visitors.

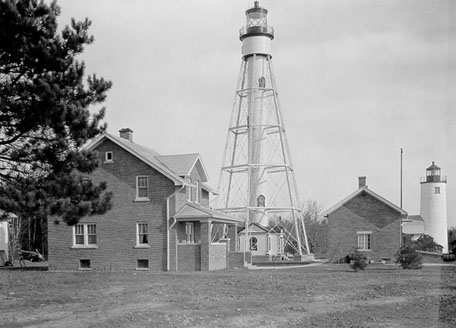
U.S. Coast Guard archive photo

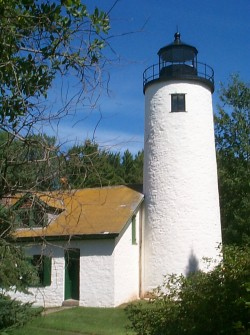
The original Michigan Island light

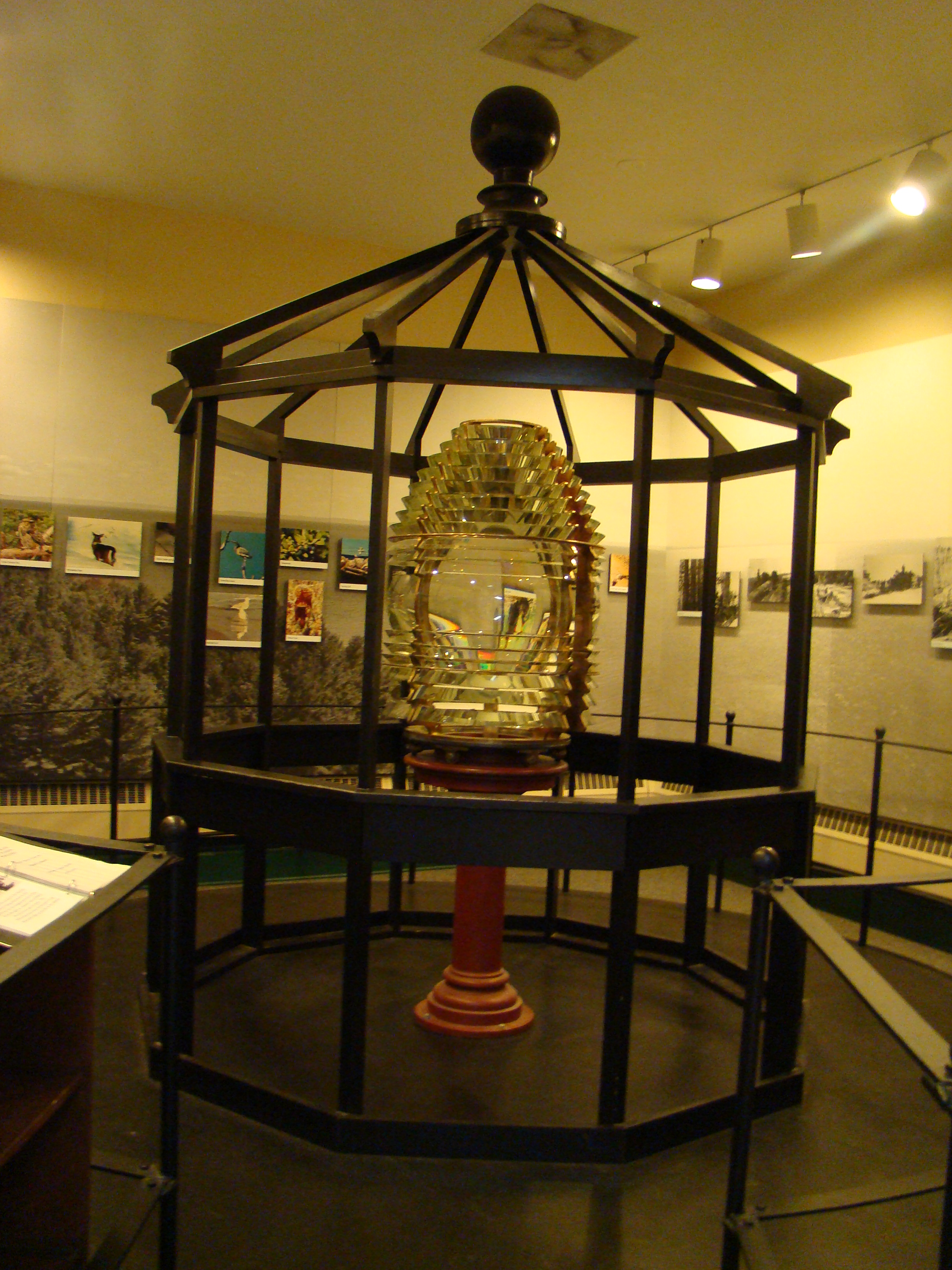
Original Michigan Island lighthouse lens, on display at the Apostle Islands National Lakeshore office in Bayfield

== See also ==
- Wisconsin lighthouses
- Apostle Islands Lighthouses
