= Michigan Island =

Island in Wisconsin, United States

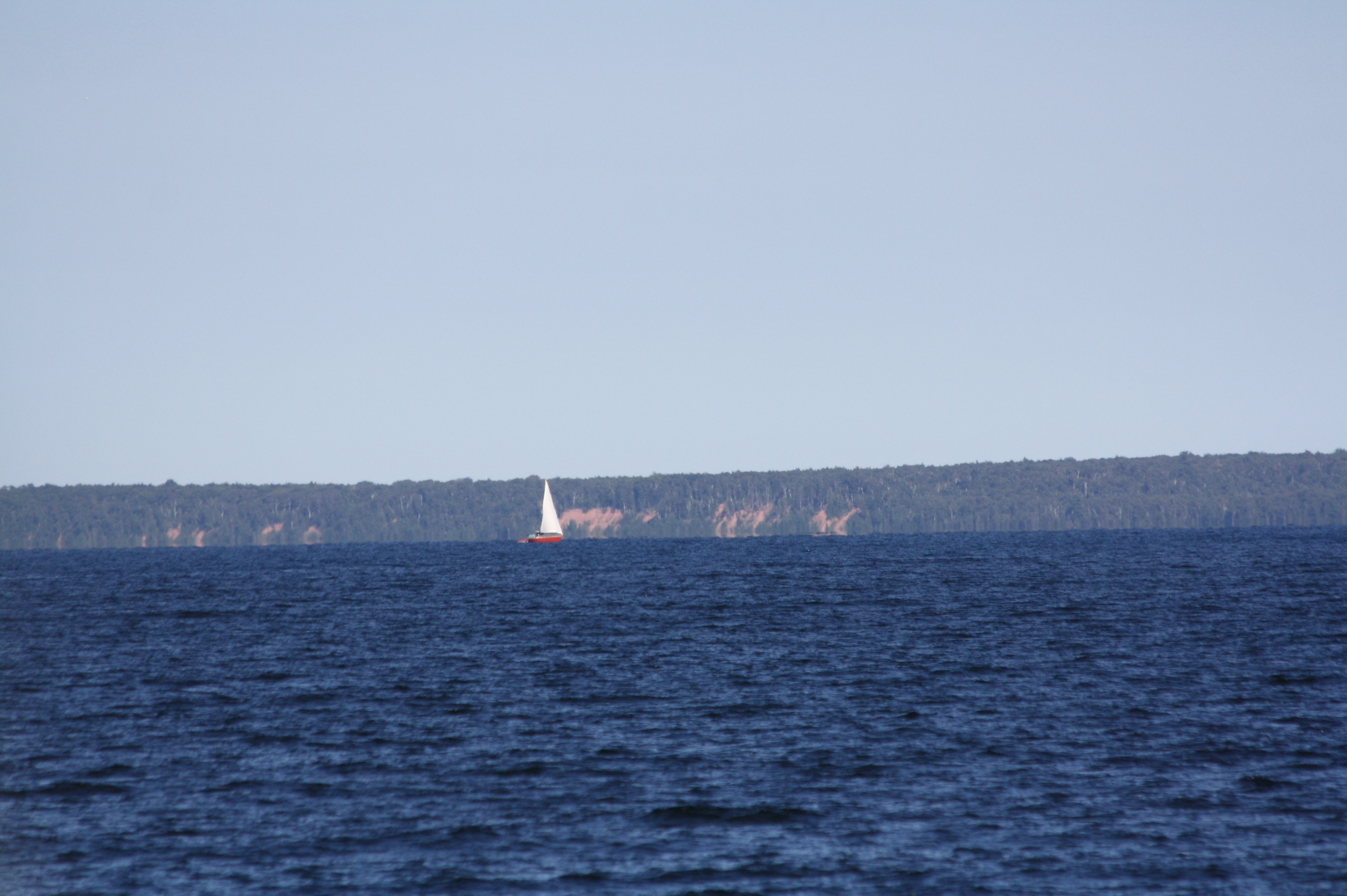
Island

Michigan Island is one of the Apostle Islands located in western Lake Superior, off the Bayfield Peninsula, in northern Wisconsin. This island has no human inhabitants, and is managed by the National Park Service as part of the Apostle Islands National Lakeshore. It is centered at approximately 46.87° N 90.49° W and has a maximum elevation of 758 feet (231 m) above sea level. Along its shores, it rises about 48 feet (15 m) above Lake Superior's official elevation of 602 feet (183 m). The Michigan Island Light, which has two towers, is located on the island.

== See also ==
- Wisconsin lighthouses
