= National Register of Historic Places listings in Ashland County, Wisconsin =

Location of Ashland County in Wisconsin

This is a list of the National Register of Historic Places listings in Ashland County, Wisconsin. It is intended to provide a comprehensive listing of entries in the National Register of Historic Places that are located in Ashland County, Wisconsin. The locations of National Register properties for which the latitude and longitude coordinates are included below may be seen in a map.

There are 42 properties and districts listed on the National Register in the county. Another property was once listed but has been removed.

This National Park Service list is complete through NPS recent listings posted November 13, 2026.

== Current listings ==
	Name on the Register	Image	Date listed	Location	City or town	Description
1	Antelope (schooner-barge) Shipwreck	Antelope (schooner-barge) Shipwreck	June 22, 2018 (#100002610)	7.5 miles (12.1 km) southeast of Michigan Island in Lake Superior	La Pointe	187-foot wood-hulled steamship built in 1861 that initially hauled passengers. Later converted to a schooner. Sank in 1897 carrying 1,000 tons of coal while being towed from the Ashland ore docks toward Duluth.
2	Apostle Islands Lighthouses	Apostle Islands Lighthouses	March 8, 1977 (#77000145)	North and east of Bayfield on Michigan, Raspberry, Outer, Sand, and Devils Islands; 46°59′38″N 90°36′06″W	Bayfield	Six lighthouses built as early as 1856, to guide ships through and around the islands.
3	Ashland County Courthouse	Ashland County Courthouse	March 9, 1982 (#82000628)	201 W. 2nd St. 46°35′28″N 90°53′07″W	Ashland	Three-story Neo-Classical building designed by H. W. Beumming of Milwaukee and Henry Wildhagen of Ashland, and built in 1915.
4	Ashland Harbor Breakwater Light	Ashland Harbor Breakwater Light	March 1, 2007 (#07000103)	Breakwater's northwest end in Chequamegon Bay, 2 miles (3.2 km) north of Bay City Creek mouth 46°37′41″N 90°52′13″W	Ashland	58 foot concrete tower at the end of the 1.5 mile artificial breakwater which the Army Corps of Engineers finished in 1915. Built primarily to protect ships in the harbor loading iron ore from the Gogebic Range.
5	Bass Island Brownstone Company Quarry	Bass Island Brownstone Company Quarry	March 29, 1978 (#78000075)	North of La Pointe on Basswood Island; 46°49′56″N 90°45′20″W	La Pointe	Site where Lake Superior Brownstone was quarried from 1868 to 1890s, and used in the old Chicago Tribune Building, among others. Boundary increased May 10, 2016.
6	Beaser School	Beaser School	July 17, 1980 (#80000102)	612 Beaser Ave. 46°34′53″N 90°53′39″W	Ashland	Partly brownstone building designed with Flemish touches by Henry Wildhagen and built in 1899. Martin Beaser was a founder of Ashland.
7	Big Bay Sloop shipwreck (sloop)		January 14, 2009 (#08001327)	300 feet east of Big Bay State Park; 46°48′31″N 90°38′44″W	La Pointe	Remains of an unidentified small sloop, probably built around 1880, lying under 25 feet of water.
8	Chapple and MacArthur Avenues Residential Historic District	Chapple and MacArthur Avenues Residential Historic District	May 27, 2014 (#14000266)	507-1023 Chapple and 600-810, 814, and 822 MacArthur Aves., 618-622 and 700-722 9th Ave., W., and 706-721 6th St., W. 46°34′55″N 90°53′10″W	Ashland	61 contributing properties, including the 1888 Shingle-style Heydlauff house, the 1891 Queen Anne/Shingle-style Charles Lamoreux house (at left), the 1893 Gothic Revival Swedish Evangelical Lutheran Church, the 1894 Stick style Lyon house, the 1904 American Foursquare Parish house, the 1911 Craftsman Frank Lamoreux house, the 1924 Dutch Colonial Revival Garnich house, and the 1933 Georgian Revival Metternich house.
9	Coole Park Manor	Coole Park Manor	June 1, 2005 (#05000529)	351 Old Fort Rd. 46°45′55″N 90°47′00″W	La Pointe	Summer home of the Hulls of Kansas City, overlooking Lake Superior, designed by Wilder and Wight and built in 1913 (or 1905?). Later Chateau Madeline.
10	Copper Falls State Park	Copper Falls State Park	December 16, 2005 (#05001425)	WI 169, 1.8 miles (2.9 km) northeast of Mellen; 46°22′33″N 90°38′50″W	Morse	Scenic gorge where Copper Culture people probably mined copper. The state park was developed in the 1930s during the Great Depression by the Works Progress Administration and Civilian Conservation Corps.
11	Ellis School	Ellis School	July 17, 1980 (#80000103)	310 Stuntz Ave. 46°35′39″N 90°52′21″W	Ashland	Simple Neoclassical school designed by Ashland architect Henry Wildhagen.
12	Fifield Place Historic District		August 30, 2023 (#100009305)	110 North Ellis Ave., 2-5 and 7 Fifield Row; 46°35′35″N 90°53′02″W	Ashland	Five Queen Anne-style homes on a block, designed by William H. Webster and built in 1887 for newspaperman and former Lieutenant Governor Sam Fifield to meet Ashland's need for housing due to the influx of people when the area's iron ore industry was established. Also Fifield's own 1883 home, designed by Antoine Perinier.
13	Glidden State Bank	Glidden State Bank	March 29, 2006 (#06000206)	216 1st St. 46°08′15″N 90°34′28″W	Jacobs	Brownstone-faced bank building constructed in Romanesque style in 1905.
14	Hadland Fishing Camp	Hadland Fishing Camp	August 18, 1977 (#77000146)	North of La Pointe on Rocky Island; 47°02′38″N 90°39′57″W	La Pointe	Norwegian immigrant Christian Hadland started this camp in 1938, and fished each year from late spring until fall. Site includes cabins, a shed for storing nets, an ice house, gill net winders, and drying frames.
15	La Pointe Indian Cemetery	La Pointe Indian Cemetery	August 3, 1977 (#77001665)	S. Old Main St. 46°46′20″N 90°46′55″W	La Pointe	Established in 1836 under La Pointe's Catholic mission headed by Father Baraga. Buried here is Chief Great Buffalo, who signed treaties for the Ojibwe with the U.S., and the Métis fur trader Michel Cadotte.
16	La Pointe Light Station	La Pointe Light Station	August 4, 1983 (#83003366)	Long Island in Chequamagon Bay; 46°43′43″N 90°47′06″W	Bayfield	Light on 65 foot skeletal tower, started in 1895 to guide ore freighters between the islands. The WPA added the lightkeeper's house in 1939.
17	Lucerne (Shipwreck)	Lucerne (Shipwreck)	December 18, 1991 (#91001775)	Off the northeastern shore of Long Island; 46°43′23″N 90°46′02″W	La Pointe	195 foot three-masted schooner built in 1873. On her last voyage in November 1886, dropped coal in Washburn, loaded 1256 tons of Gogebic iron ore at Ashland, and left for Cleveland. She sank in a snowstorm, with all crew lost.
18	Manitou Camp	Manitou Camp	January 19, 1983 (#83003367)	Manitou Island; 46°57′20″N 90°40′35″W	Apostle Islands National Lakeshore	Remote island-camp from which men logged and fished since the 1890s. Site includes cabins, twine sheds, and fishing implements.
19	Marina Site	Marina Site	December 22, 1978 (#78000076)	Address restricted	La Pointe	Site of Indian village and cemetery, probably from the 1700s and 1800s during fur trade era. Burials include nine copper bracelets.
20	Marion Park Pavilion	Marion Park Pavilion	June 4, 1981 (#81000032)	Marion Park; 46°08′03″N 90°35′23″W	Glidden	Eight-sided dance hall with maple floor and domed roof, designed by Frank Huber and built in 1938 with help from the WPA.
21	Marquette (shipwreck)	Marquette (shipwreck)	February 13, 2008 (#08000027)	5 miles (8.0 km) east of Michigan Island in Lake Superior; 46°50′02″N 90°25′47″W	La Pointe	235 foot wooden bulk freighter built in 1881 in Cleveland. On Oct 15, 1903, heading east with iron ore in fair weather, she sprang a leak and sank. The crew escaped.
22	Mellen City Hall	Mellen City Hall	September 20, 1979 (#79000341)	Bennett and Main Sts. 46°19′37″N 90°39′37″W	Mellen	The Queen Anne-style city hall designed by Henry Wildhagen and built in 1895 has housed police and fire department, an opera house on the second floor, a library, and now a museum.
23	Memorial Hall	Memorial Hall	April 27, 1995 (#95000503)	1511 Ellis Ave. 46°34′47″N 90°52′25″W	Ashland	Residence hall and one-time commons (with attached root cellar) at Northland College, designed by Thomas Shefchik and built in 1928.
24	Moonlight shipwreck	Moonlight shipwreck	October 1, 2008 (#08000979)	7 miles (11 km) east of Michigan Island; 46°49′56″N 90°22′42″W	La Pointe	Graceful sailing schooner built in 1874 by Wolf & Davidson in Milwaukee. Her topmasts were removed in 1889 when she was converted to a barge. Sank in a storm in September 1903 while being towed with a load of iron ore out of Ashland.
25	Morty Site (47AS40)		June 13, 1988 (#88000145)	Address restricted	Bayfield	Prehistoric site on Stockton Island - probably a moose-hunting camp. Pottery fragments indicate one occupation around 900 CE and another around 1685.
26	Noquebay (Schooner-Barge) Shipwreck Site	Noquebay (Schooner-Barge) Shipwreck Site	June 4, 1992 (#92000593)	Julian Bay off Stockton Island; 46°55′45″N 90°32′39″W	La Pointe	205-foot schooner-barge built in 1872 in Trenton, Michigan. On October 6, 1905, it was loaded with 600,000 board feet of hemlock lumber and being towed toward Bay City, Michigan when she caught fire and eventually sank.
27	Old Ashland Post Office	Old Ashland Post Office	January 21, 1974 (#74000054)	601 W. 2nd St. 46°35′20″N 90°53′24″W	Ashland	Monumental public building designed by Willoughby J. Edbrooke and built with locally quarried brownstone in 1892-93 as a post office. Has also housed a vocational school and now the city hall. It is considered by some the best example of Richardsonian Romanesque architecture in northern Wisconsin.
28	P-Flat Site (47AS47)		September 19, 1988 (#88000144)	Address restricted	Bayfield	Late fall fishing station on Manitou Island, used in the late 1600s and/or early 1700s.
29	Pretoria (schooner-barge) Shipwreck Site	Pretoria (schooner-barge) Shipwreck Site	August 17, 1994 (#94000835)	1 mile (1.6 km) northeast of Outer Island; 47°05′22″N 90°23′40″W	Bayfield	338-foot schooner-barge built in 1900 in West Bay City, Michigan. On Sept. 1, 1905 she left Superior with a load of iron ore, towed by a steamer heading for Chicago. They were caught by the same storm that sank the Sevona, and the Pretoria sank with five crew lost. A boundary increase was approved April 14, 2025.
30	R.G. Stewart (shipwreck)	R.G. Stewart (shipwreck)	December 27, 1991 (#91001850)	Chequamegon Bay off Michigan Island; 46°52′24″N 90°28′30″W	La Pointe	100 foot wooden passenger steamer built in 1878 in Buffalo. On June 4, 1899 she ran off course in a fog and ran aground on Michigan Island, then caught fire. One crewman died.
31	Rocky Island Historic District	Rocky Island Historic District	July 3, 2008 (#08000016)	Rocky Island, Apostle Islands National Lakeshore; 47°01′25″N 90°40′57″W	La Pointe	Cluster of fish camps on the east end of Rocky Island, small-scale enterprises operated from 1938 to 1958: Hadland, Benson, Edwards, Nelson & Erickson.
32	Security Savings Bank	Security Savings Bank	December 27, 1974 (#74000055)	212-214 W. 2nd St. 46°35′26″N 90°53′06″W	Ashland	Richardsonian Romanesque bank designed by local architects Conover and Porter and built in 1889 in brick and brownstone. Later occupied by the Ashland Light, Power and Street Railway Company. In 1935 the lower exterior was refinished with black granite.
33	Soo Line Depot	Soo Line Depot	November 3, 1988 (#88002177)	3rd Ave., W., at 4th St. 46°35′20″N 90°53′03″W	Ashland	Large Brownstone union depot built in 1889 by the Wisconsin Central Railway in Richardsonian Romanesque style.
34	T.H. Camp (shipwreck)	T.H. Camp (shipwreck)	September 15, 2004 (#04001001)	Address restricted	La Pointe	Steam-powered tugboat built in 1876. Served as a "purchase boat," collecting catch from remote fish camps as far away as Isle Royale or Canada. Sank in 1900.
35	Trout Point Logging Camp		December 16, 1988 (#88002756)	Address restricted	Bayfield	Site of logging camp on Stockton Island where as many as 100 men worked from the 1890s to 1920.
36	Union Depot	Union Depot	March 23, 1979 (#79000058)	417 Chapple Ave. 46°35′09″N 90°53′21″W	Ashland	Queen Anne-styled depot designed by Charles Sumner Frost of Chicago and built in 1900.
37	Wakefield Hall	Wakefield Hall	May 4, 1995 (#95000466)	1409 Ellis Ave. 46°34′51″N 90°52′26″W	Ashland	Georgian Revival building designed by Thomas Shefchik and built in 1940 as a library at Northland College. Now offices.
38	West Second Street Historic District	West Second Street Historic District	February 2, 1984 (#84003619)	W. 2nd St. from Ellis Ave. to 6th Ave. 46°35′24″N 90°53′10″W	Ashland	45 contributing commercial buildings built from 1884 to 1937 varying in style from the Blue Ribbon Bar to the Northern National Bank and the Royal Theatre
39	Wheeler Hall, Northland College	Wheeler Hall, Northland College	September 13, 1977 (#77000029)	1411 Ellis Ave. 46°34′50″N 90°52′27″W	Ashland	The original building of Northland College, then called the North Wisconsin Academy. Designed by H. P. Padley of Madison in Richardsonian Romanesque style and built in 1893.
40	Lewis C. and Caroline Wilmarth House	Lewis C. and Caroline Wilmarth House	January 29, 2013 (#12001252)	622 Chapple Ave. 46°35′07″N 90°53′14″W	Ashland	Georgian Revival mansion built in 1885 by Lewis Cass Wilmarth, Ashland's first banker. In 1918 a hospital wing was added, and the mansion end served as entry and offices for Ashland General Hospital until 1972. Now apartments.
41	Wilmarth School	Wilmarth School	July 17, 1980 (#80000104)	913 3rd Ave., W. 46°35′02″N 90°52′49″W	Ashland	Public school designed by local architect Henry Wildhagen with Palladian shape and brownstone accents and built in 1895, when Ashland was booming.
42	Winston-Cadotte Site	Winston-Cadotte Site	December 16, 2005 (#05001424)	Address restricted 46°45′15″N 90°47′00″W	La Pointe	Site on a point of Madeline Island where Ojibwe, Odawa and Huron may have traded between 1600 and 1650. Later the site of Michel Cadotte's trading post, from roughly 1790 to 1833.

== Former listing ==
	Name on the Register	Image	Date listed	Date removed	Location	City or town	Description
1	Ashland Middle School	Ashland Middle School	July 17, 1980 (#80000101)	May 12, 2009	1000 Ellis Ave.	Ashland	Brick and brownstone Neoclassical school designed by Henry Wildhagen. Served as high school from around 1904 until 1973, then as middle school.

== See also ==
- List of National Historic Landmarks in Wisconsin
- National Register of Historic Places listings in Wisconsin
- Listings in neighboring counties: Bayfield, Iron, Price, Sawyer
