= National Register of Historic Places listings in Apostle Islands National Lakeshore =

This is a list of the National Register of Historic Places listings in Apostle Islands National Lakeshore.

This is intended to be a complete list of the properties and districts on the National Register of Historic Places in Apostle Islands National Lakeshore, Wisconsin, United States. The locations of National Register properties and districts for which the latitude and longitude coordinates are included below, may be seen in a Google map.

There are thirteen properties and districts listed on the National Register in the park.

This National Park Service list is complete through NPS recent listings posted March 21, 2025.

== Current listings ==
	Name on the Register	Image	Date listed	Location	City or town	Description
1	Apostle Islands Lighthouses	Apostle Islands Lighthouses	March 8, 1977 (#77000145)	N and E of Bayfield on Michigan, raspberry, Outer, Sand and Devils Islands; 46°59′38″N 90°36′06″W	Bayfield	
2	Bass Island Brownstone Company Quarry	Bass Island Brownstone Company Quarry	March 29, 1978 (#78000075)	N of La Pointe on Basswood Island; 46°49′56″N 90°45′20″W	La Pointe	
3	Hadland Fishing Camp	Hadland Fishing Camp	August 18, 1977 (#77000146)	N of La Pointe on Rocky Island; 47°02′38″N 90°39′57″W	La Pointe	
4	Hokenson Fishing Dock	Hokenson Fishing Dock	June 18, 1976 (#76000050)	N of Bayfield at Little Sand Bay; 46°56′48″N 90°53′29″W	Bayfield	
5	La Pointe Light Station	La Pointe Light Station	August 4, 1983 (#83003366)	Long Island in Chequamagon Bay; 46°43′43″N 90°47′06″W	Bayfield	Light on 65 foot skeletal tower, started in 1895 to guide ore freighters between the islands. The WPA added the lightkeeper's house in 1939.
6	Manitou Camp	Manitou Camp	January 19, 1983 (#83003367)	Manitou Island; 46°57′20″N 90°40′35″W	Apostle Islands National Lakeshore	
7	Morty Site (47AS40)	Morty Site (47AS40)	June 13, 1988 (#88000145)	Address Restricted	Bayfield	
8	P-Flat Site (47AS47)	P-Flat Site (47AS47)	September 19, 1988 (#88000144)	Address Restricted	Bayfield	
9	Rocky Island Historic District	Rocky Island Historic District	July 3, 2008 (#08000016)	Rocky Island, Apostle Islands National Lakeshore; 47°02′45″N 90°39′58″W	La Pointe vicinity	
10	Sevona Cabin		September 29, 1976 (#76000051)	N of Bayfield on Sand Island; 46°57′49″N 90°56′14″W	Bayfield	
11	Shaw Farm		June 18, 1976 (#76000052)	Sand Island; 46°57′47″N 90°56′03″W	Bayfield	
12	Trout Point Logging Camp	Trout Point Logging Camp	December 16, 1988 (#88002756)	Address Restricted	Bayfield	
13	West Bay Club		July 28, 2015 (#14000385)	Sand Island; 46°58′19″N 90°58′35″E	Bayfield	

== See also ==
- National Register of Historic Places listings in Ashland County, Wisconsin
- National Register of Historic Places listings in Bayfield County, Wisconsin
- National Register of Historic Places listings in Wisconsin
