= Glidden State Bank =

- U.S. National Register of Historic Places
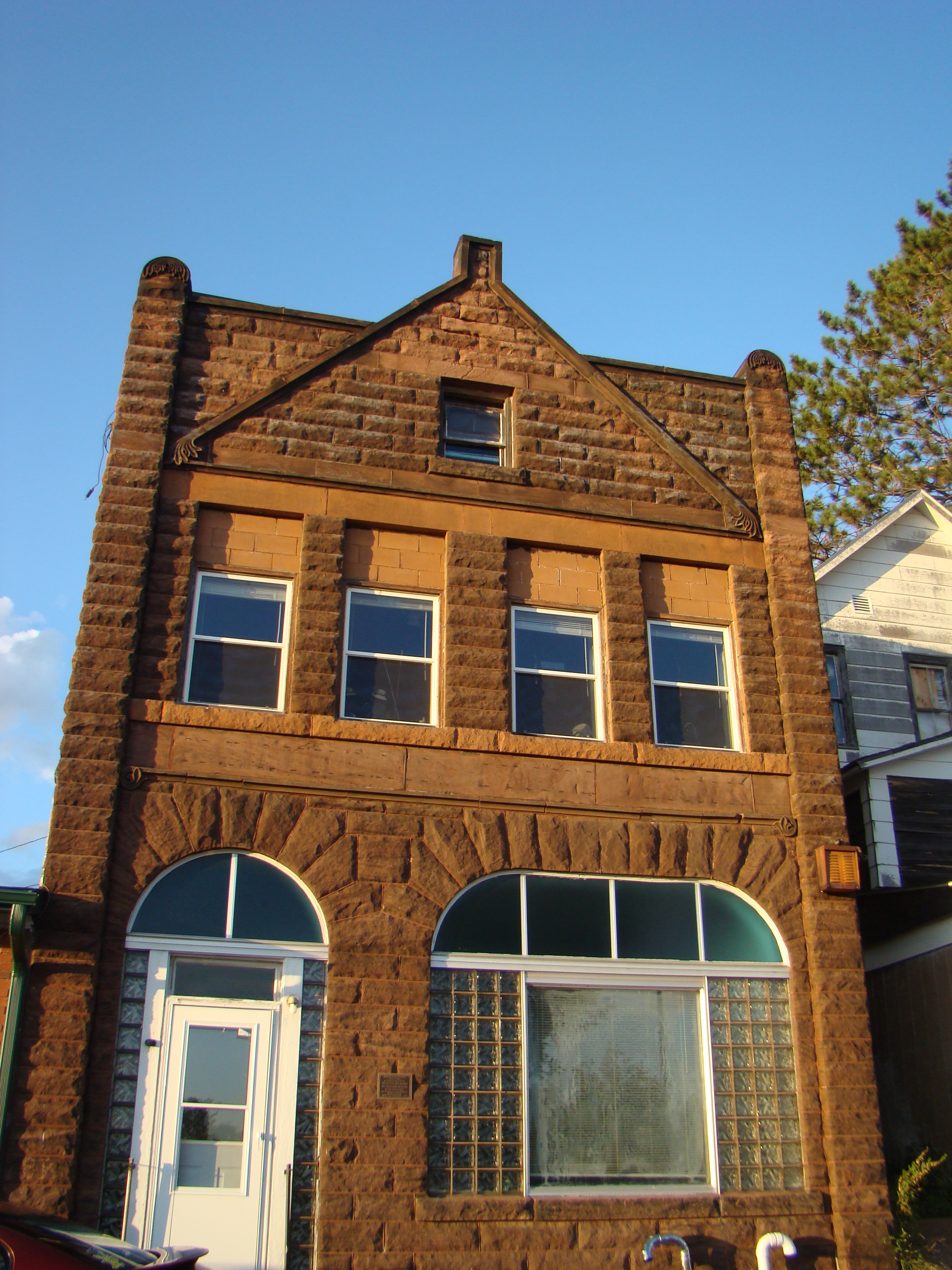

- Location within Wisconsin Location within the United States
- Location: 216 First St. Jacobs, Wisconsin
- Coordinates: 46°8′15″N 90°34′28″W
- Area: less than one acre
- Built: 1905
- Built by: Conrad Mohr
- Architectural style: Romanesque
- NRHP reference No.: 06000206
- Added to NRHP: March 29, 2006

Glidden State Bank was a bank in Glidden, Wisconsin. It was added to the National Register of Historic Places in 2006. The builder was Conrad Mohr.

== History ==
The bank, established in 1902, moved into its newly built location at 216 First Street in 1905. Glidden State Bank later went through a series of changes to its name, eventually becoming the Northern Street Bank. The Northern State Bank would move to a different location in Glidden in 1978.

== See also ==
- National Register of Historic Places listings in Ashland County, Wisconsin
