= T.H. Camp (shipwreck) =

Wooden tugboat which sank in Lake Superior

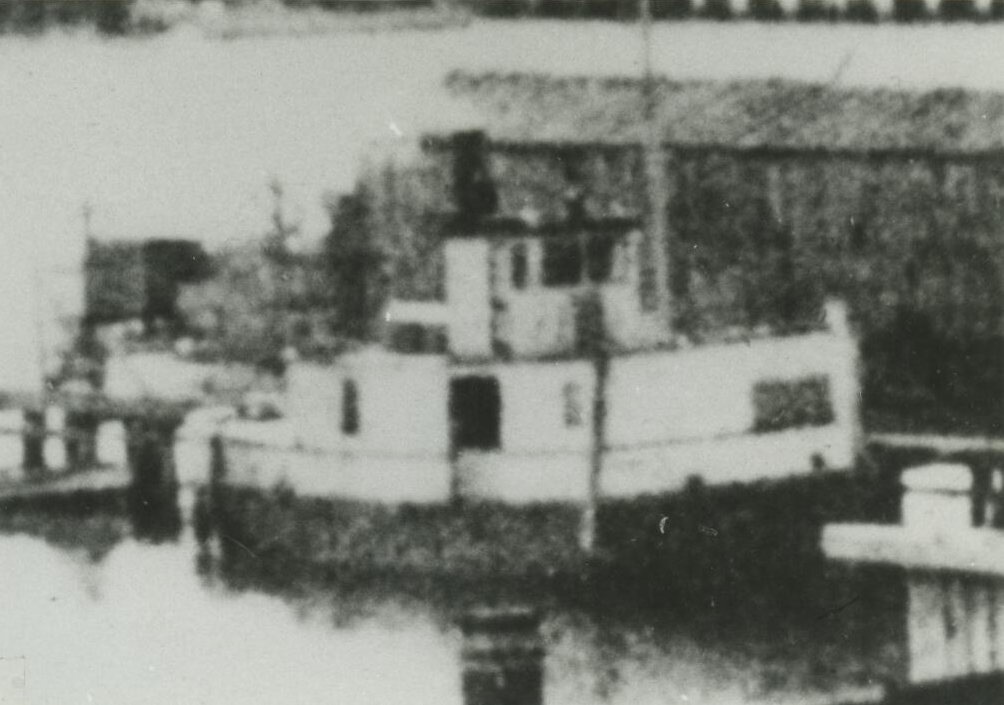
- The T.H. Camp circa 1885

History
- Name: T.H. Camp
- Owner: Booth Packing Company
- Port of registry: United States
- Launched: 1876
- Fate: Sank November 16, 1900
- Notes: Added to the National Register of Historic Places in 2004

General characteristics
- Type: Tugboat
- Tonnage: 58 gross tons
- Length: 64.5 feet (20 m)
- Beam: 28 feet (9 m)
- Depth of hold: 5 feet (2 m)

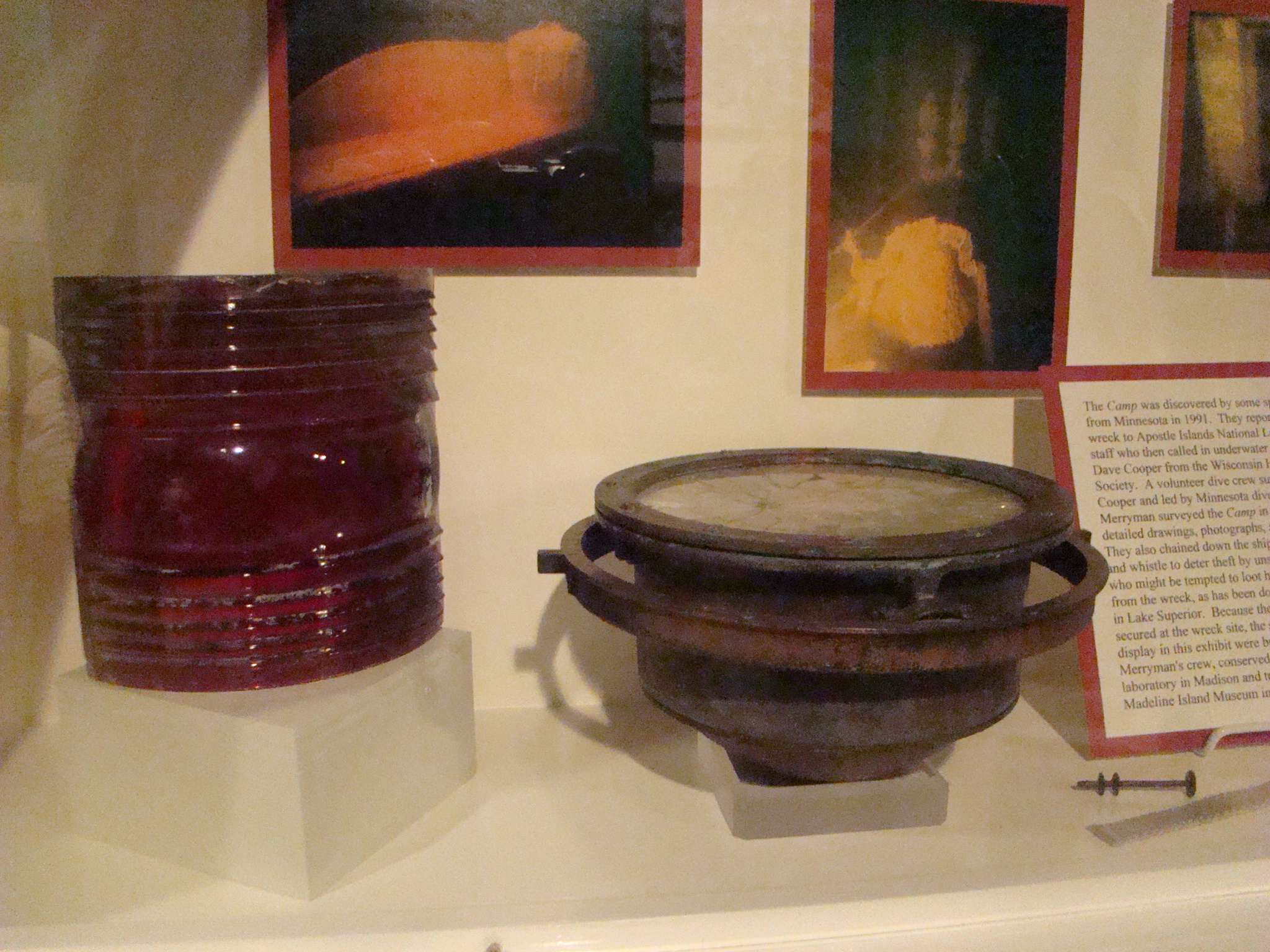
Items recovered from the wreck of T.H. Camp, on display at the Madeline Island Historical Museum.

T. H. Camp was a wooden tugboat, operated by the Booth Packing Company of Bayfield, Wisconsin. On November 16, 1900, she sank in Lake Superior, between Madeline and Basswood Islands. The site of the wreck was added to the National Register of Historic Places in 2004.

== History ==
T. H. Camp was built in 1876 at Cape Vincent, New York. She measured 64.5 feet in length and was rated at 58 gross register tons.

On the afternoon of November 16, 1900, 'T. H. Camp left Ashland, Wisconsin, with a heavy load of cargo, consisting mostly of camp supplies. She made a brief stop by nearby Bayfield and took on additional cargo, adding to her already heavy load. The waters of Lake Superior were choppy as she departed Bayfield bound for the northern end Brigham and Gardner logging camp on the northern end of Madeline Island.

During the trip, T. H. Camp′s crew noticed a sailboat that looked like it was in distress. At a point nearly opposite the Bass Island Brownstone Company Quarry on Basswood Island, the tug′s captain ordered her engines put in reverse, with the intention of giving the sailboat a tow. Suddenly, the tug′s cargo shifted, and she lurched over to one side, taking on a dangerous list. The problem worsened until the tug started taking on water and sank.

The wreck of T. H. Camp remains upright and intact at the bottom of the lake with its 20 tons of logging camp supplies still on board.

== See also ==
- List of shipwrecks in the Great Lakes
- Apostle Islands
