= Manitou Island (Wisconsin) =

Island in Wisconsin, United States

Coordinates: 46°57′55.77″N 90°39′25.75″W

One of the twenty-two Apostle Islands of northern Wisconsin, Manitou Island has also been known as New Jersey Island (Henry R. Schoolcraft's 1820 map) and Tait's Island (Asaph Whittlesey's 1871 map).

The island is located in western Lake Superior off the Bayfield Peninsula, is centered at approximately 46°57'55.77" N 90°39'25.75" W and has a maximum elevation of 728' above sea level.

The island has no human inhabitants and is managed by the National Park Service as part of the Apostle Islands National Lakeshore. Manitou Camp is on the island.
