= Rocky Island (Wisconsin) =

Island in Wisconsin, United States

Coordinates: 47°02′21″N 090°40′44″W

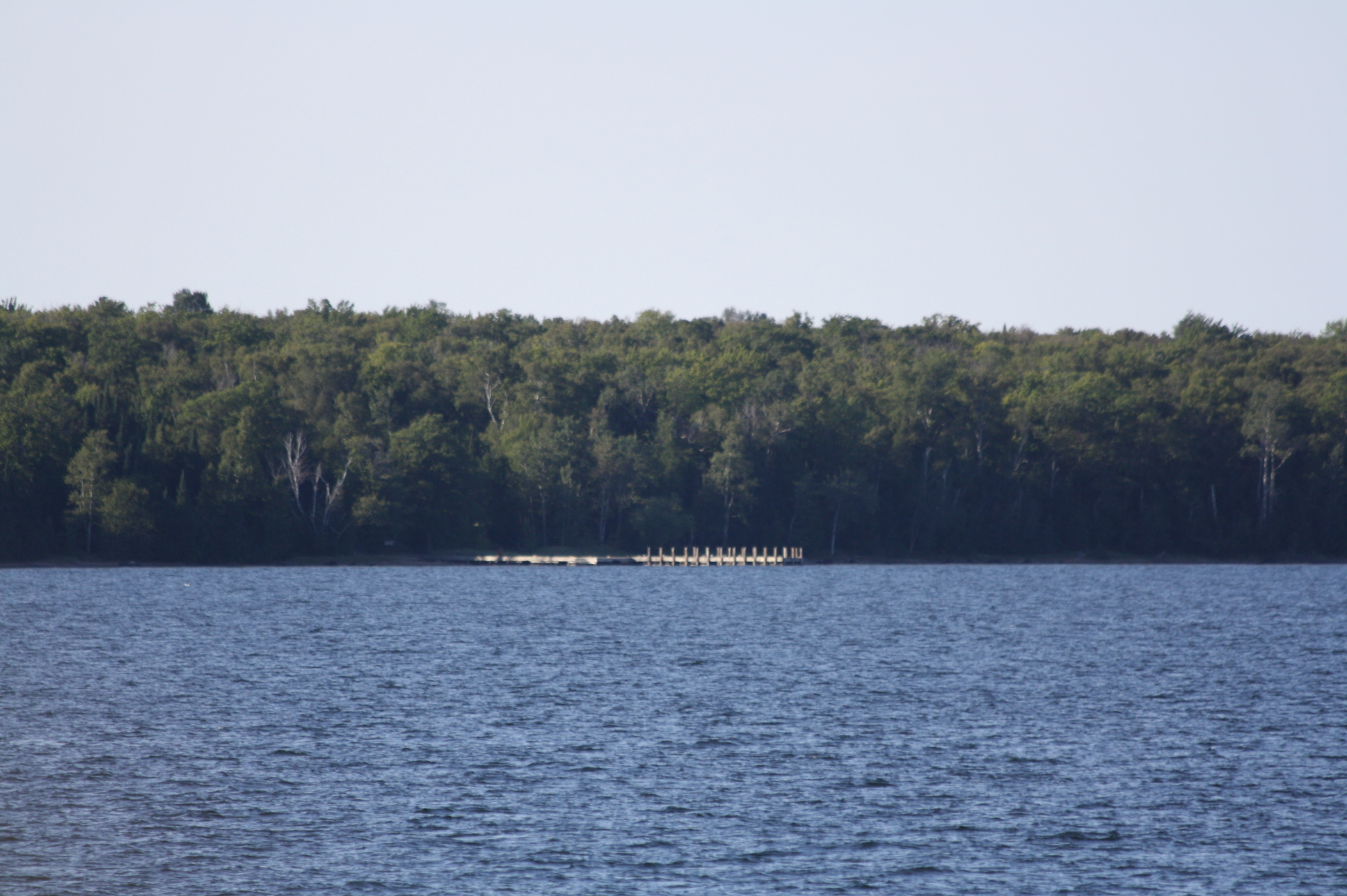
Rocky Island

Rocky Island is one of the Apostle Islands in northern Wisconsin, in Lake Superior, and is part of the Apostle Islands National Lakeshore. Two listings on the National Register of Historic Places are located on the island: Hadland Fishing Camp and the Rocky Island Historic District.
