= Marion Park Pavilion =

- U.S. National Register of Historic Places
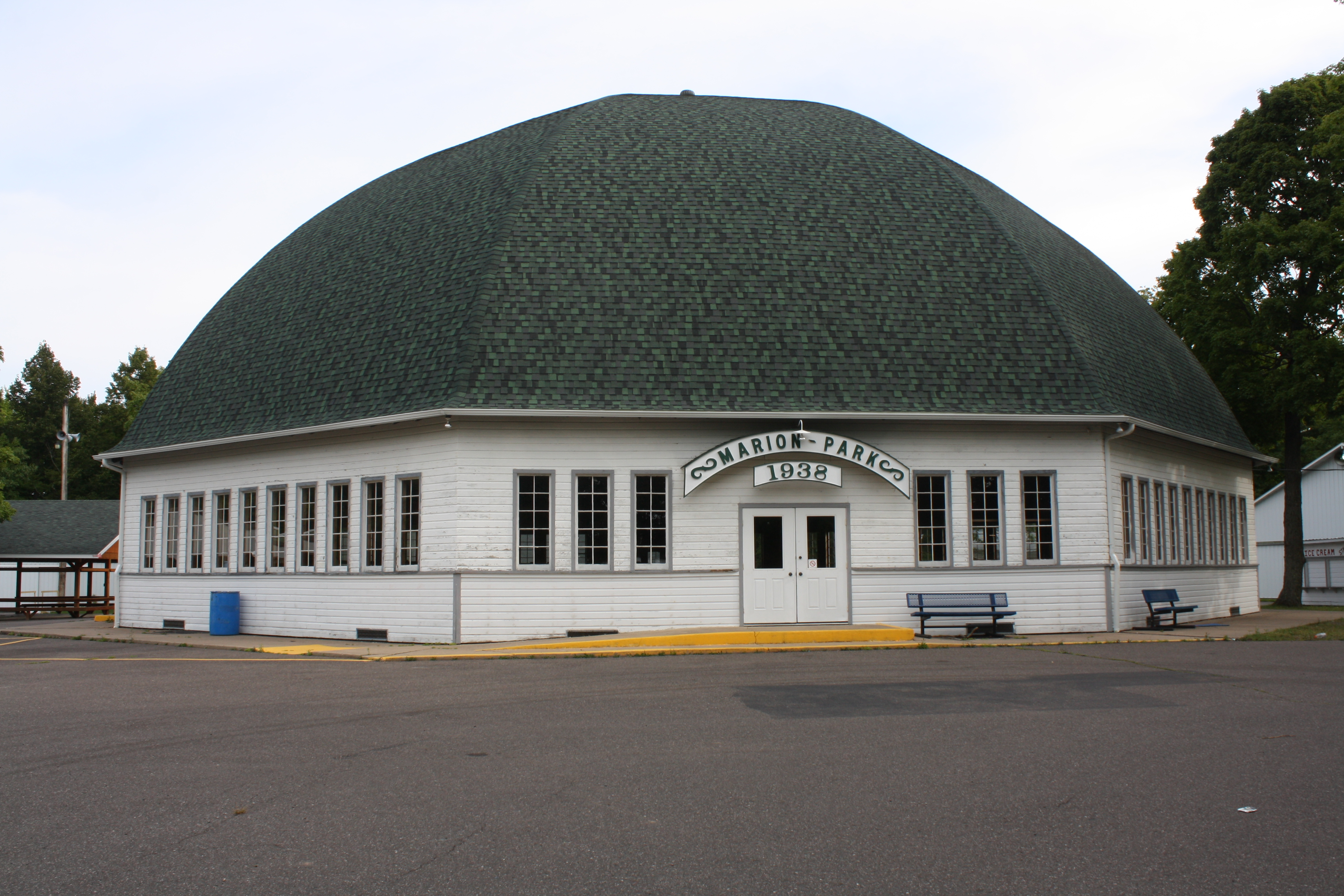

- Location within Wisconsin Location within the United States
- Location: Marion Park; Glidden, Wisconsin
- Coordinates: 46°8′3″N 90°35′23″W
- Built: 1938
- NRHP reference No.: 81000032
- Added to NRHP: June 4, 1981

The Marion Park Pavilion is a multi-use dance hall and Pavilion in Glidden, Wisconsin, United States. It was added to the National Register of Historic Places in 1981.

== History ==
The pavilion is located in Marion Park and was built in 1938. It was designed to provide unobstructed space for dancing. The building is now used as a community gathering place, such as during the local Glidden Community Fair. The building has an unusual octagonal shape, with a domed roof. The building is considered seasonal, and therefore does not have a heating system for winter use. However, the building does have electricity.

== See also ==
- National Register of Historic Places listings in Ashland County, Wisconsin
