= Brownstone =

Type of sandstone, or U.S. townhouse built thereof

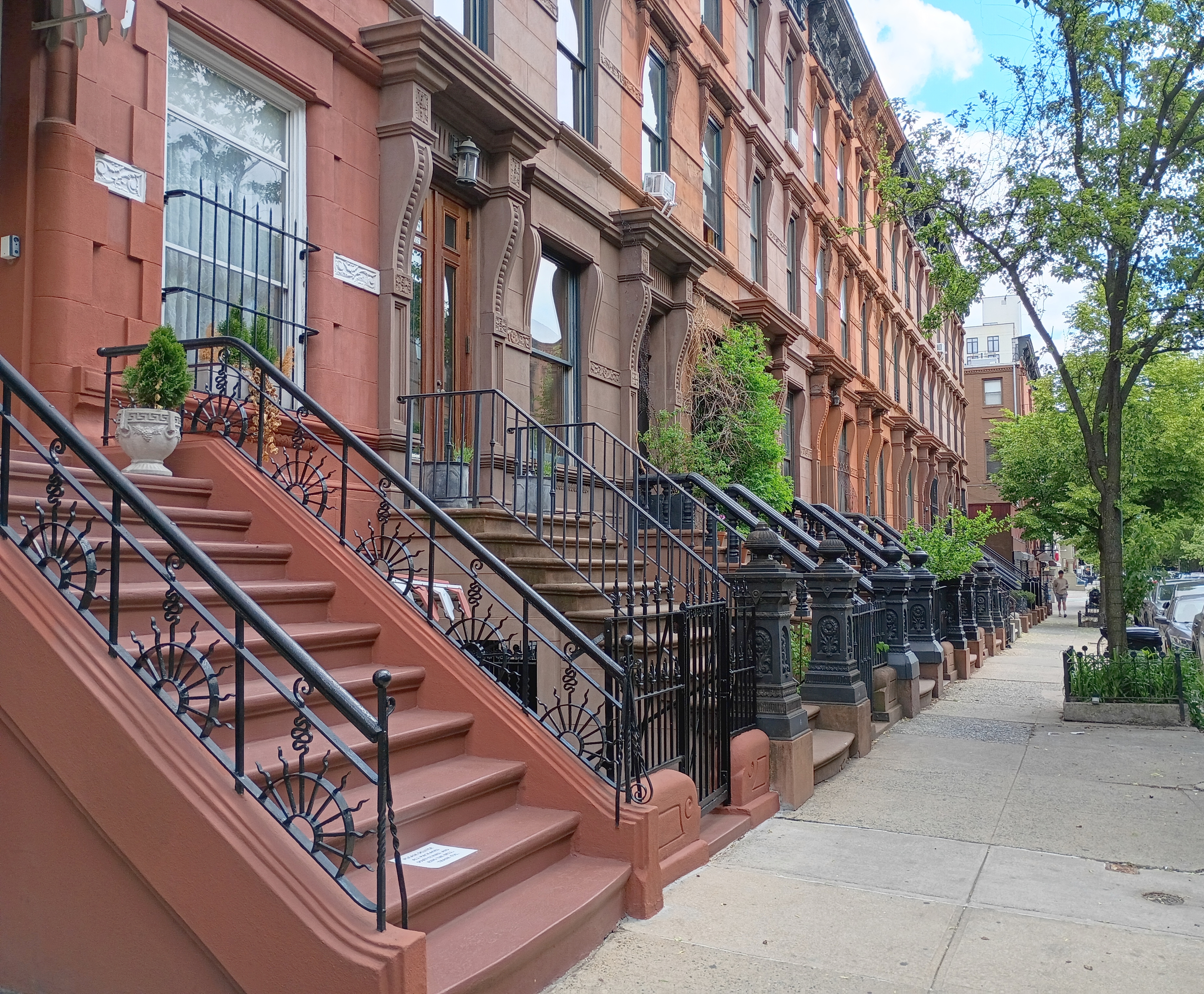
Brownstones in Harlem, Manhattan, New York City

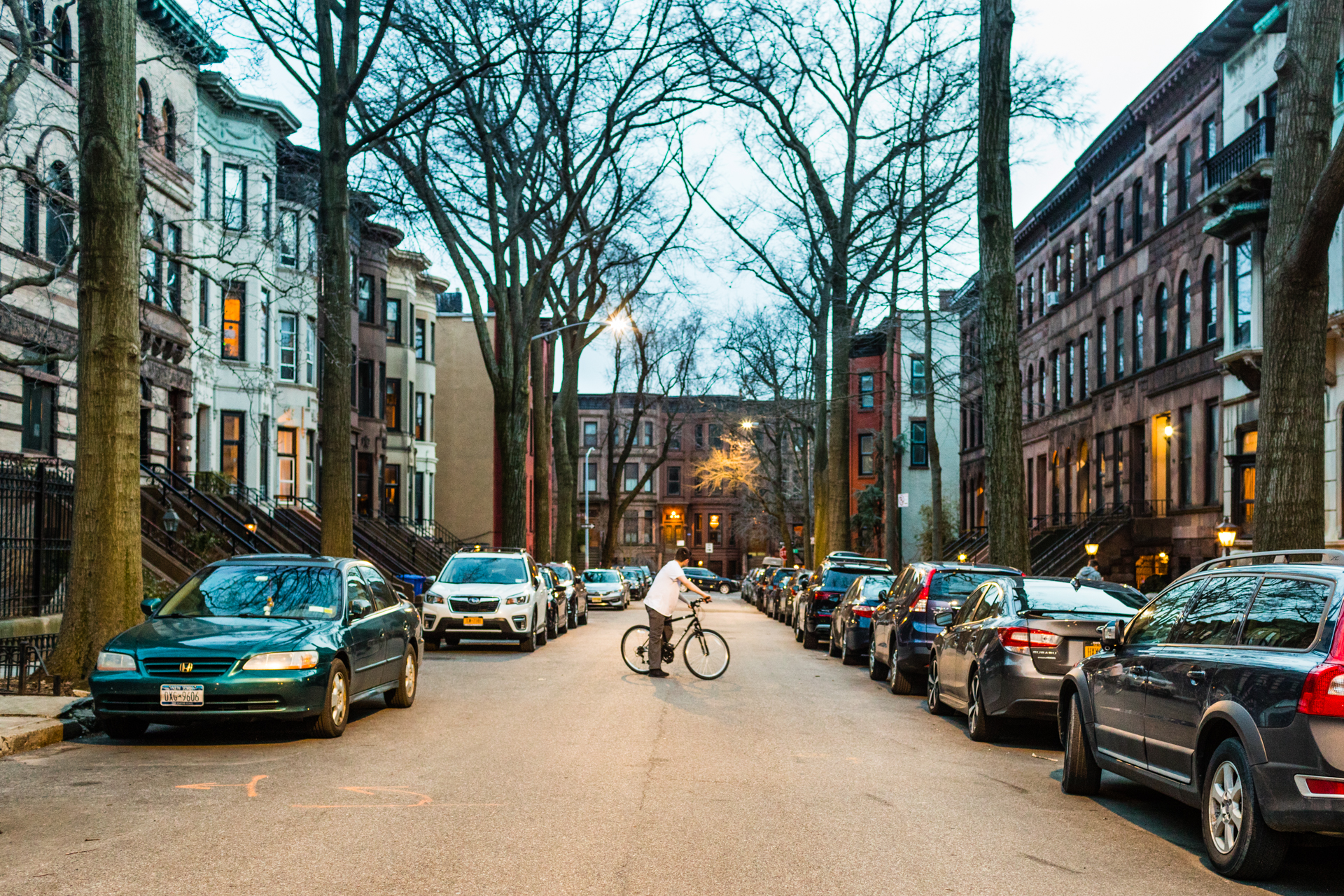
Biking among brownstones in Park Slope, Brooklyn

Brownstone is a brown Triassic–Jurassic sandstone that was historically a popular building material. The term is also used in the United States and Canada to refer to a townhouse clad in this or any other aesthetically similar material.

Brownstone was a popular building material because it is unusually easy to quarry and carve; these qualities also make structures clad in it susceptible to weathering and damage over time.

== Types ==
=== Apostle Island brownstone ===
In the 19th century, Basswood Island, Wisconsin, was the site of a quarry run by the Bass Island Brownstone Company, which operated from 1868 into the 1890s. The brownstone from this and other quarries in the Apostle Islands was in great demand, with brownstone from Basswood Island being used in the construction of the first Milwaukee County Courthouse in the 1860s.

=== Hummelstown brownstone ===
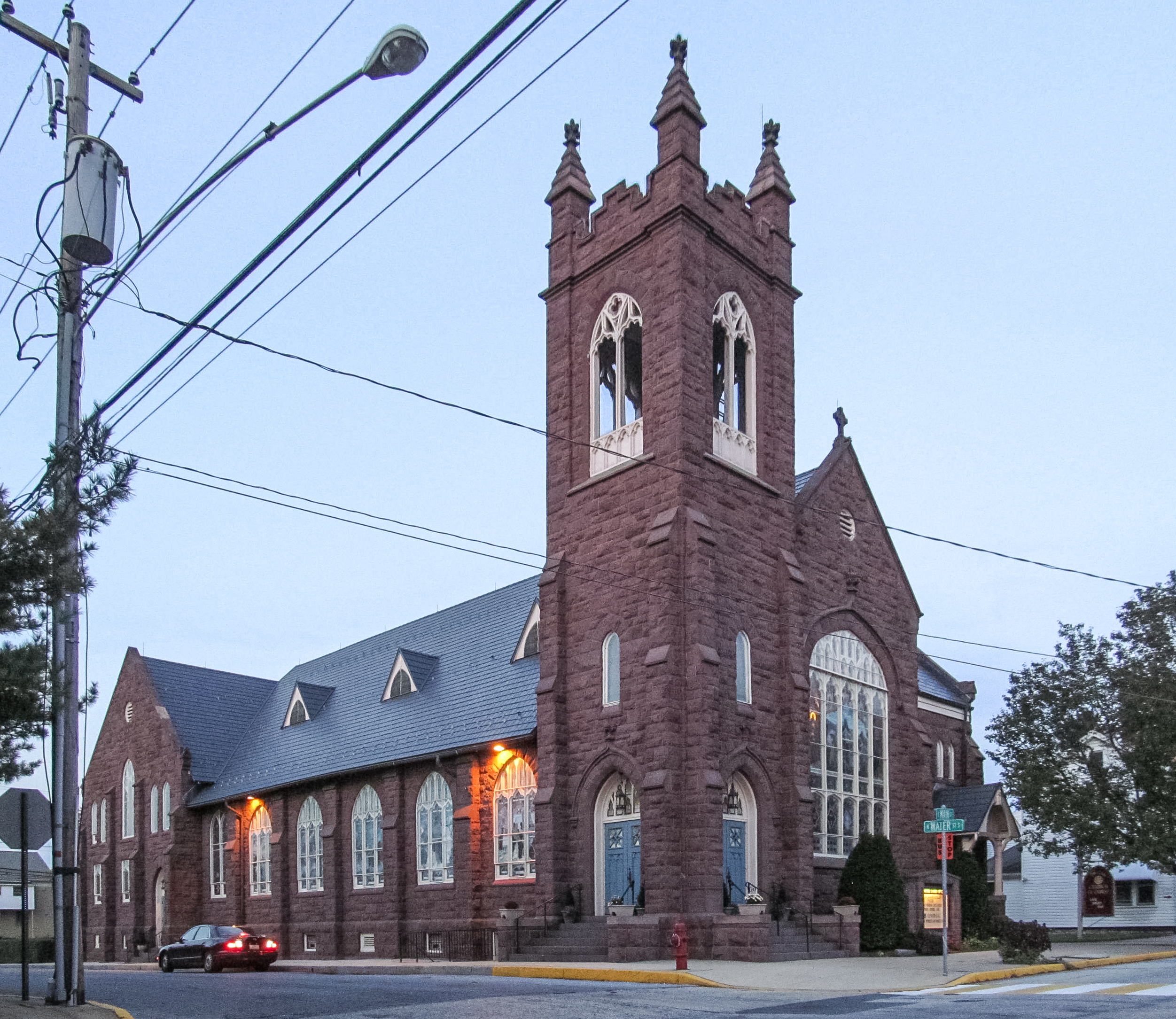
Many buildings in Hummelstown, Pennsylvania, are constructed of Hummelstown brownstone.

Hummelstown brownstone is extremely popular along the East Coast of the United States, with numerous government buildings throughout West Virginia, Pennsylvania, New York, Maryland, and Delaware being faced entirely with the stone, which comes from the Hummelstown Quarry in Hummelstown, Pennsylvania, a small town outside of Harrisburg, Pennsylvania. The Hummelstown Quarry is the largest provider of brownstone on the east coast. Typically, the stone was transported out of Hummelstown through the Brownstone and Middletown Railroad.

=== Portland brownstone ===
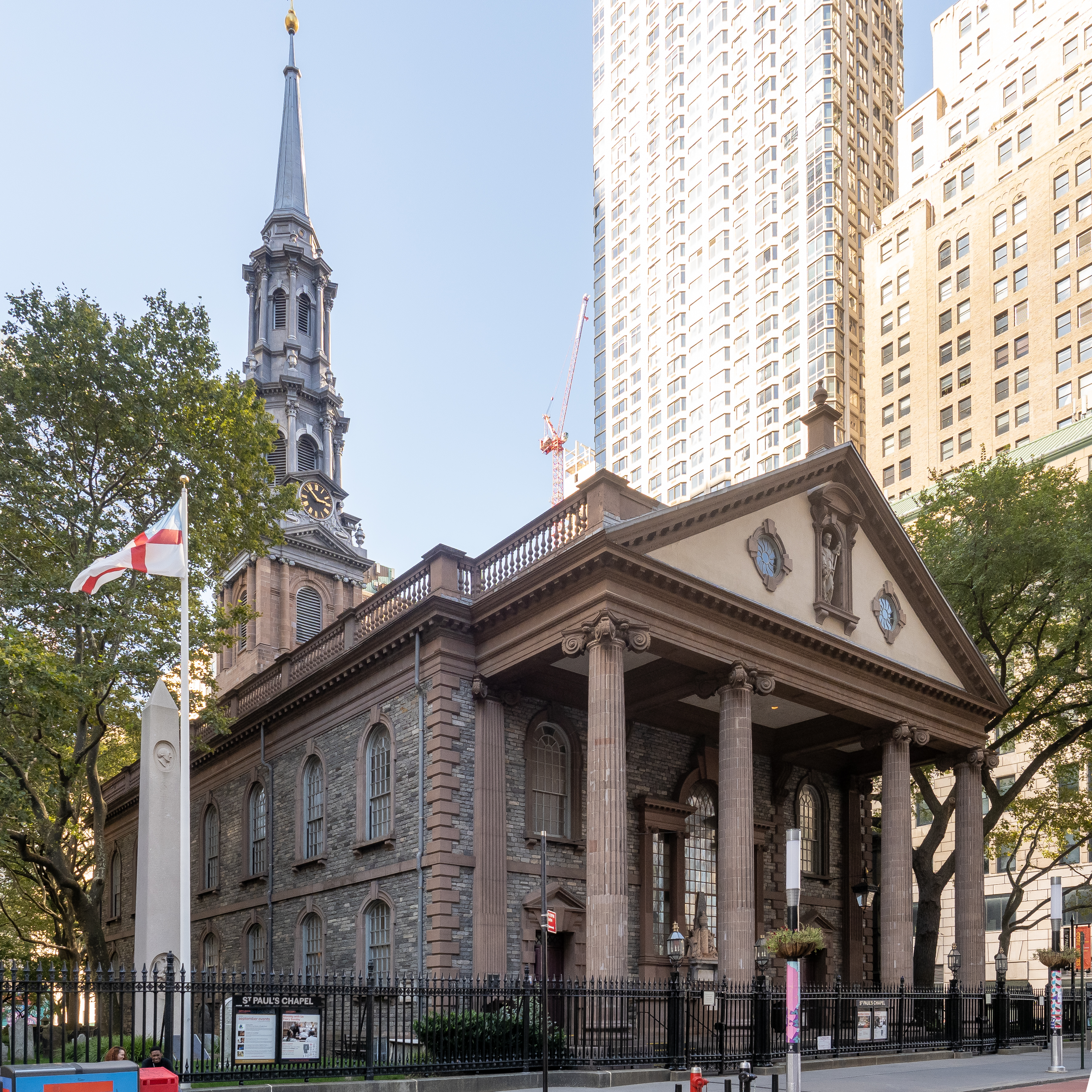
St. Paul's Chapel in lower Manhattan features Portland Brownstone quoins.

Portland brownstone, also known as Connecticut River Brownstone, is also very popular. The stone from quarries located in Portland, Connecticut, and environs was used in a number of landmark buildings in Chicago, Boston, New York City, Philadelphia, New Haven, Hartford, Washington, D.C., and Baltimore.

=== New Jersey brownstone ===
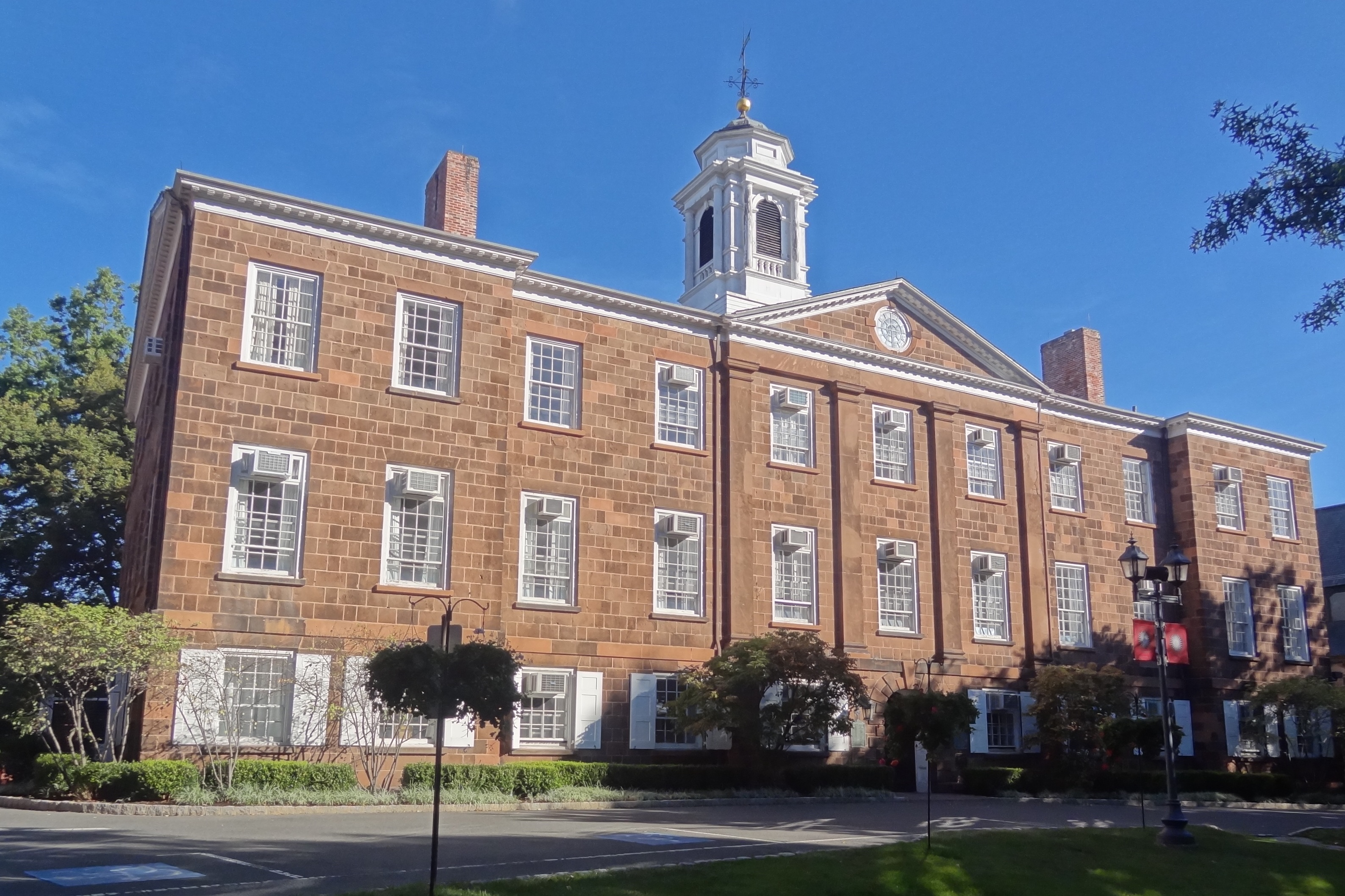
Old Queens (built 1809–1823) at Rutgers University was constructed from ashlar brownstone quarried near New Brunswick, New Jersey.

Quarries from the Passaic Formation in northern New Jersey once supplied most of the brownstone used in New York City and New Jersey.

=== South Wales brownstone ===
Devonian aged sandstone is commonly used in Southern Wales.

== Use ==
=== In urban private residences ===
Brownstones appear throughout numerous New York City neighborhoods, especially in the Brooklyn areas of Park Slope, Clinton Hill, Fort Greene, Cobble Hill, Carroll Gardens, Boerum Hill, Gowanus, Windsor Terrace, Prospect Heights, Crown Heights, Brooklyn Heights, Bedford Stuyvesant, and Sunset Park. Smaller concentrations exist in parts of Bay Ridge, Williamsburg, Bushwick, Greenpoint, and Prospect Lefferts Gardens.

Brownstones are also scattered throughout Manhattan from the Lower East Side to Washington Heights, with notable concentrations in the Upper West Side, Upper East Side, Harlem and East Harlem. In Queens and The Bronx, the historic districts of Long Island City and Mott Haven also host many brownstones. Brownstones also predominate in some Hudson County neighborhoods directly across the Hudson River from Manhattan, especially in Hoboken and around Paulus Hook, Van Vorst Park, Harsimus Cove, Hamilton Park and Bergen Hill in Jersey City. New York City brownstones can cost several million dollars to purchase. A typical architectural detail of brownstones in and around New York City is the stoop, a steep staircase rising from the street to the entrance on what amounts to almost the second-floor level. This design was seen as hygienic at the time many were built, because the streets were so foul with animal waste.

It has become fashionable to use the term "brownstone" to refer to almost any townhouse from a certain period, even though they may not have been built of brownstone. For example, many townhouses in Boerum Hill in Brooklyn are built of brick, but have concrete masonry cladding which resembles stone. There are also many brick townhouses that have brownstone-built stoops throughout the outer boroughs. Such neighborhoods that consist of these homes are Borough Park, Dyker Heights, Bensonhurst, Bath Beach, Sunset Park, Kensington, Flatbush, Midwood, East New York, Cypress Hills in Brooklyn, Long Island City, Ridgewood, Glendale, Astoria, Woodhaven in Queens, and Longwood and Morrisania in the Bronx.

The Rittenhouse Square and Fairmount neighborhoods of Philadelphia also include examples of brownstone architecture. Many of these homes have been converted into apartment buildings.

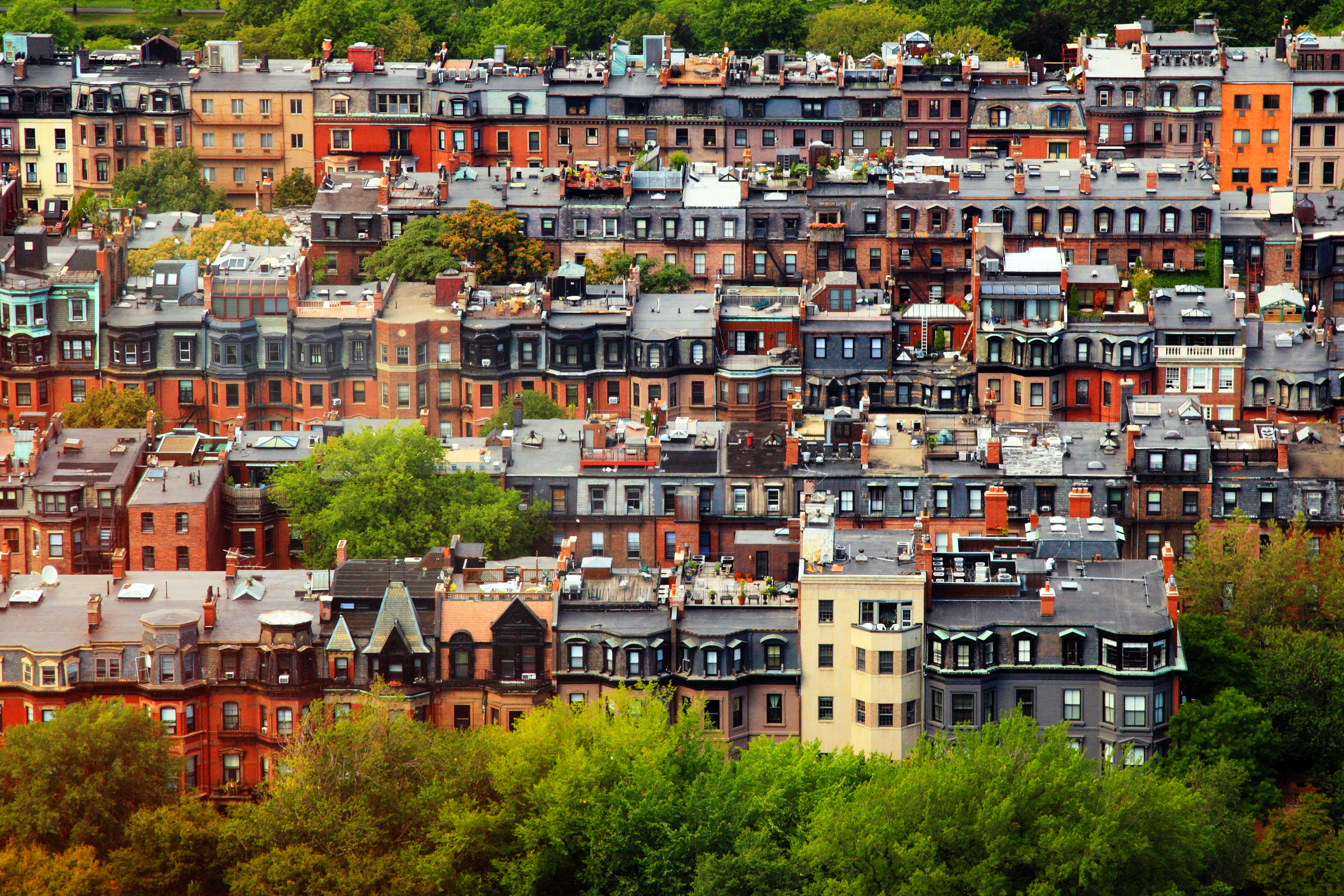
Brownstones in Boston's Back Bay neighborhood

Back Bay, Boston, is known for its Victorian brownstone homes – considered some of the best-preserved examples of 19th-century urban design in the United States.

Although some brownstones exist in Chicago, a similar residential form known as "greystones" is far more prevalent. A greystone is a type of residential structure that utilizes Indiana limestone for its facade, regardless of its overall architectural style. As in Brooklyn, there is a "Greystone Belt" in Chicago, with large numbers of such structures located in the south and northwest quadrants of the city. It is estimated that around 30,000 of Chicago's greystones built between 1890 and 1930 are still standing.

=== In colonial country homes ===
Brownstone, also known as freestone because it can be cut freely in any direction, was used by early Pennsylvanian Quakers to construct stone mills and mill houses. In central Pennsylvania, some 1700s-era structures survive, including a residence known as the Quaker Mill House.

=== In tombstones ===
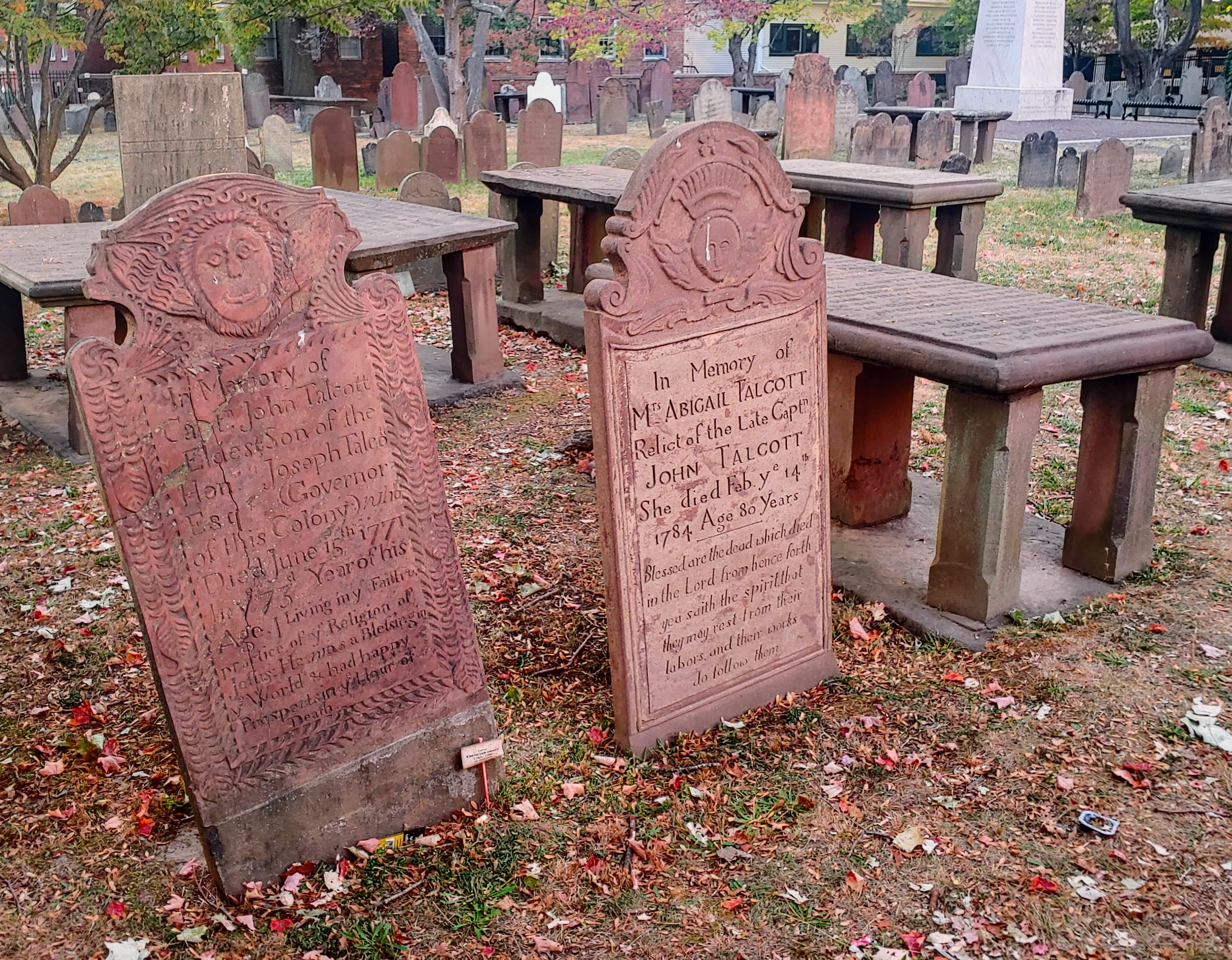
Example of Portland Brownstone used on colonial tombstones and tabletop markers in Hartford, Connecticut

Brownstone was prized by tombstone carvers in southern New England and the Mid-Atlantic region during the Colonial era. Table-type memorials in particular were often carved out of brownstone as well as regular headstones. Especially valued for being easy to carve, those same characteristics often resulted in stones being less durable and prone to heavy erosion and wear over time, especially when compared to slate or schist gravestones of the same time period. Brownstone began losing popularity among carvers during the first few decades of the 1800s owing to the rising popularity of marble, though it continued to be used for obelisks and other grave monuments until much later. Brownstone used for headstones was usually quarried from the Connecticut River Valley and New Jersey, and many carvers especially in Connecticut, New York and New Jersey worked with it.

== See also ==
- Besançon, France, noted for building façades made of stone from the Chailluz Quarry
- Dimension stone
- Greystone
- Hummelstown Brownstone Company
- Railroad apartment
- Sandstone
