= Coole Park Manor =

- U.S. National Register of Historic Places
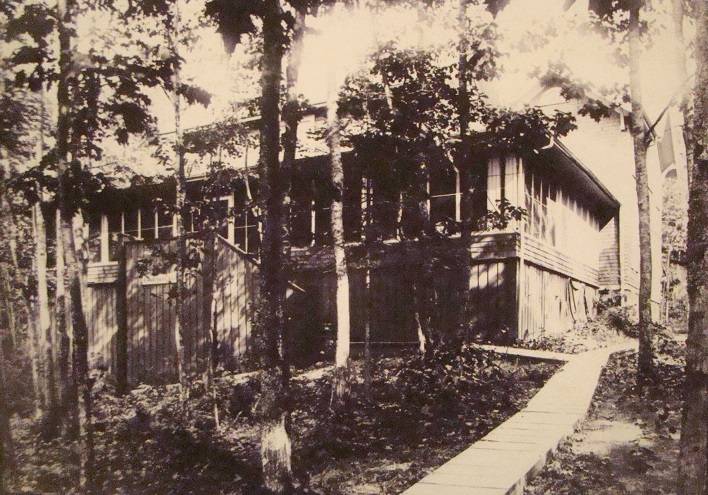

- Location within Wisconsin Location within the United States
- Location: 351 Old Fort Road; La Pointe, Wisconsin
- Coordinates: 46°45′55″N 90°47′00″W
- Built: 1913
- NRHP reference No.: 05000529
- Added to NRHP: June 1, 2005

Coole Park Manor is a historic summer cottage in La Pointe, Wisconsin. It was built in 1913 and added to the National Register of Historic Places on July 1, 2005.

The property is located on the southern shoreline of Madeline Island, and consists of the main house, workshop, garden, and three cabins. The property is also located in the neighborhood of a few other historically important places, including the La Pointe Indian Cemetery, and the LaPointe headquarters of the American Fur Company.

== See also ==
- National Register of Historic Places listings in Ashland County, Wisconsin
