= Basswood Island =

Island in Wisconsin, United States

Coordinates: 46°51′01″N 90°44′47″W

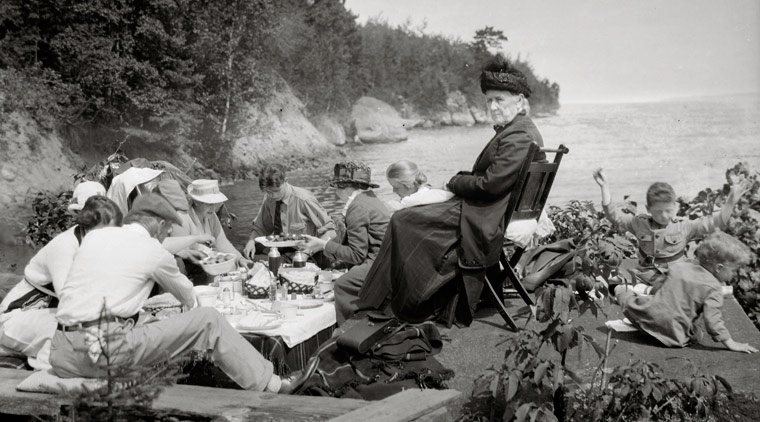
A family gathering on Basswood Island in 1916

Basswood Island is a Wisconsin island in Lake Superior. It is one of the Apostle Islands and a part of the Apostle Islands National Lakeshore.

From 1865 to 1923, the island was home to a farm run by Richard McCloud and Elisha Brigham. It was also the site of a quarry run by the Bass Island Brownstone Company which operated from 1868 into the 1890s. The brownstone from this and other Apostle Islands quarries was in great demand, and brownstone from Basswood Island was used in the construction of the first Milwaukee County Courthouse in the 1860s. The quarry was listed on the National Register of Historic Places in the 1970s.

== Images ==
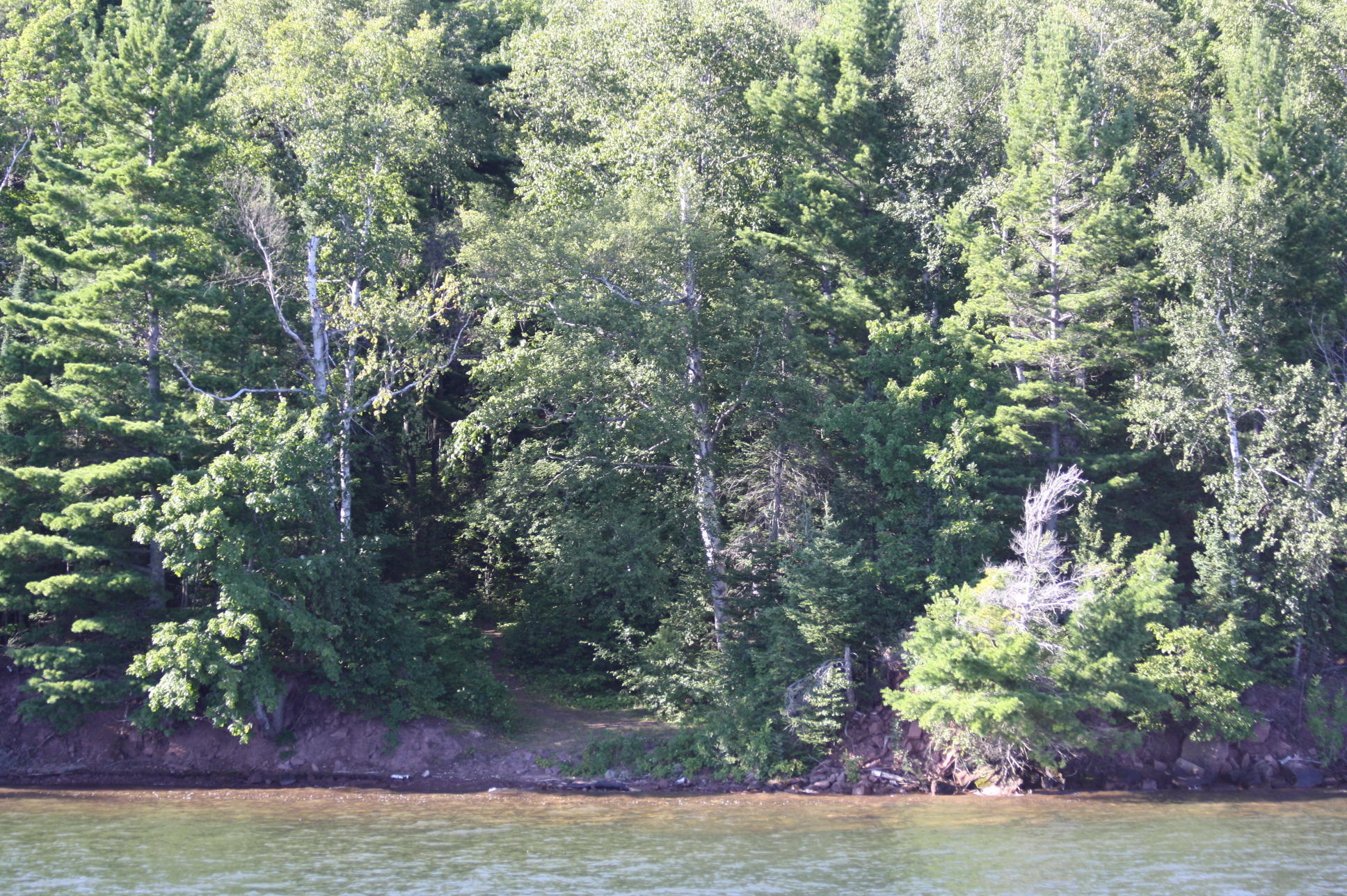
Path to the Basswood Island quarry

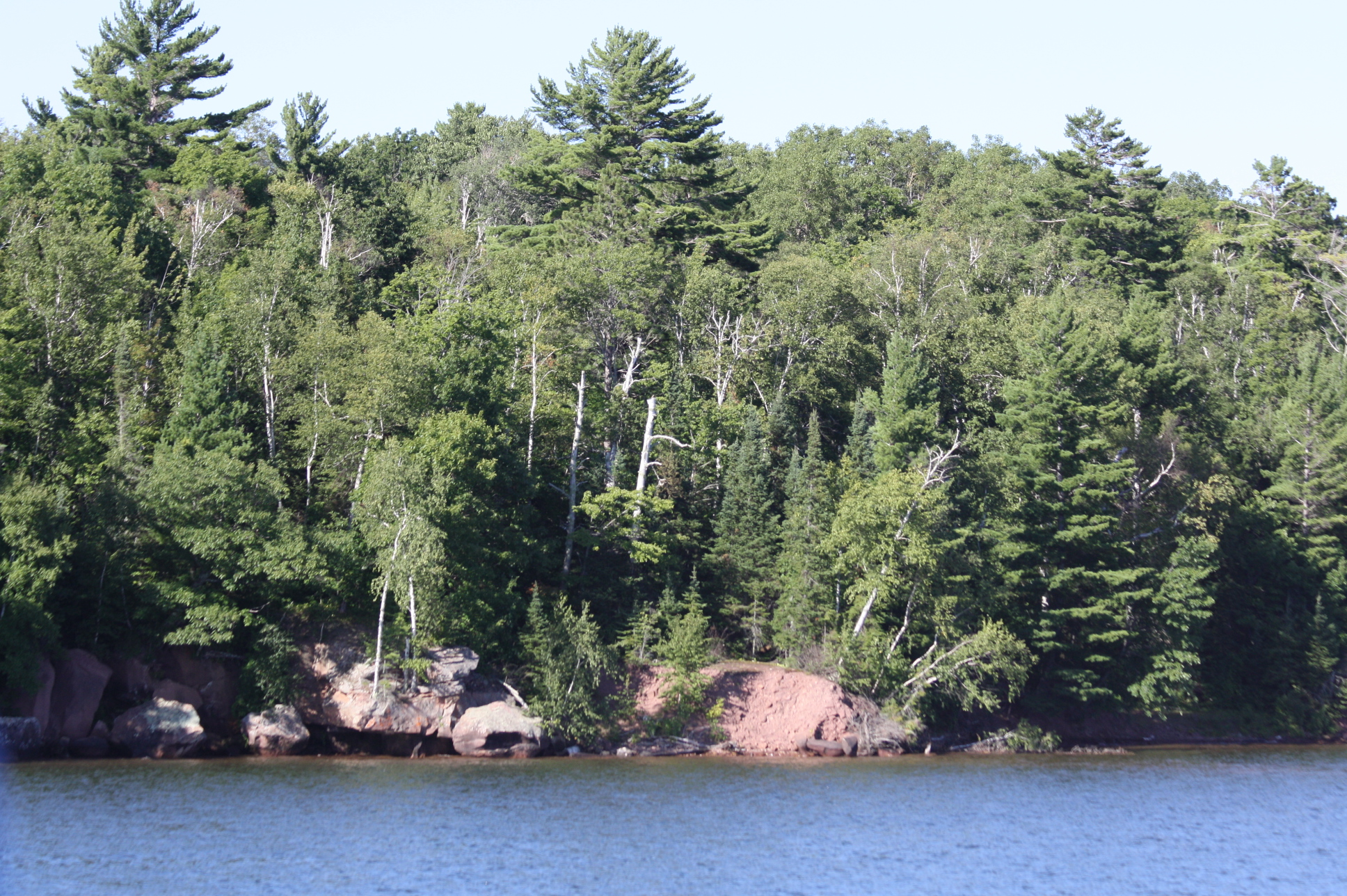
Shore in 2012

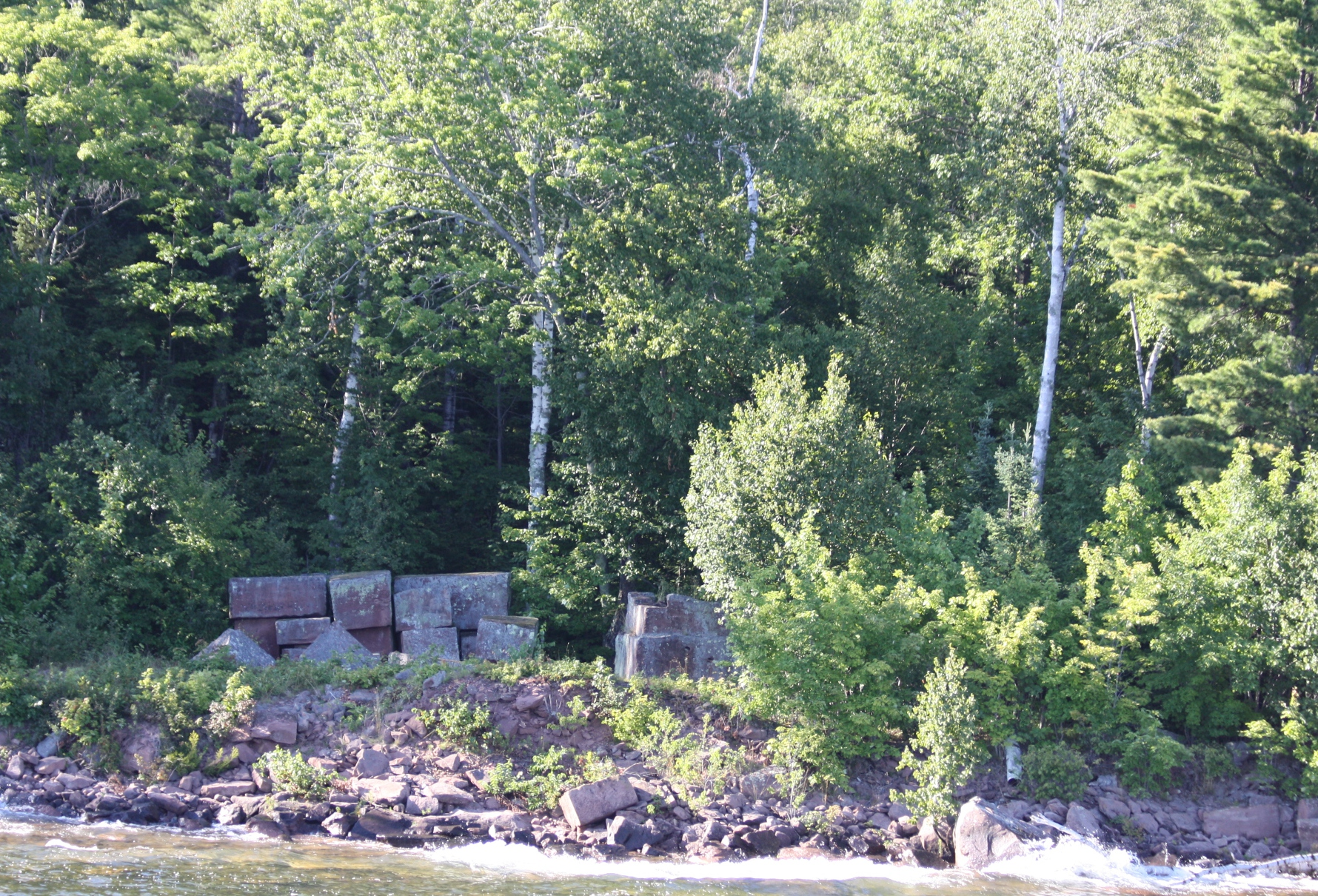
Quarry remnants in 2012
