= Forest of Chailluz =

Coordinates: 47°18′N 6°4′E

The Forest of Chailluz is a wooded area comprising 1,673 hectares, located in Besançon, in the Doubs, France. It is bisected by Highway A36. Its elevation ranges from 319 metres (1,047 ft) around Thise to 619 metres (2,031 ft) at the Fort de la Dame Blanche.

== Quarry ==
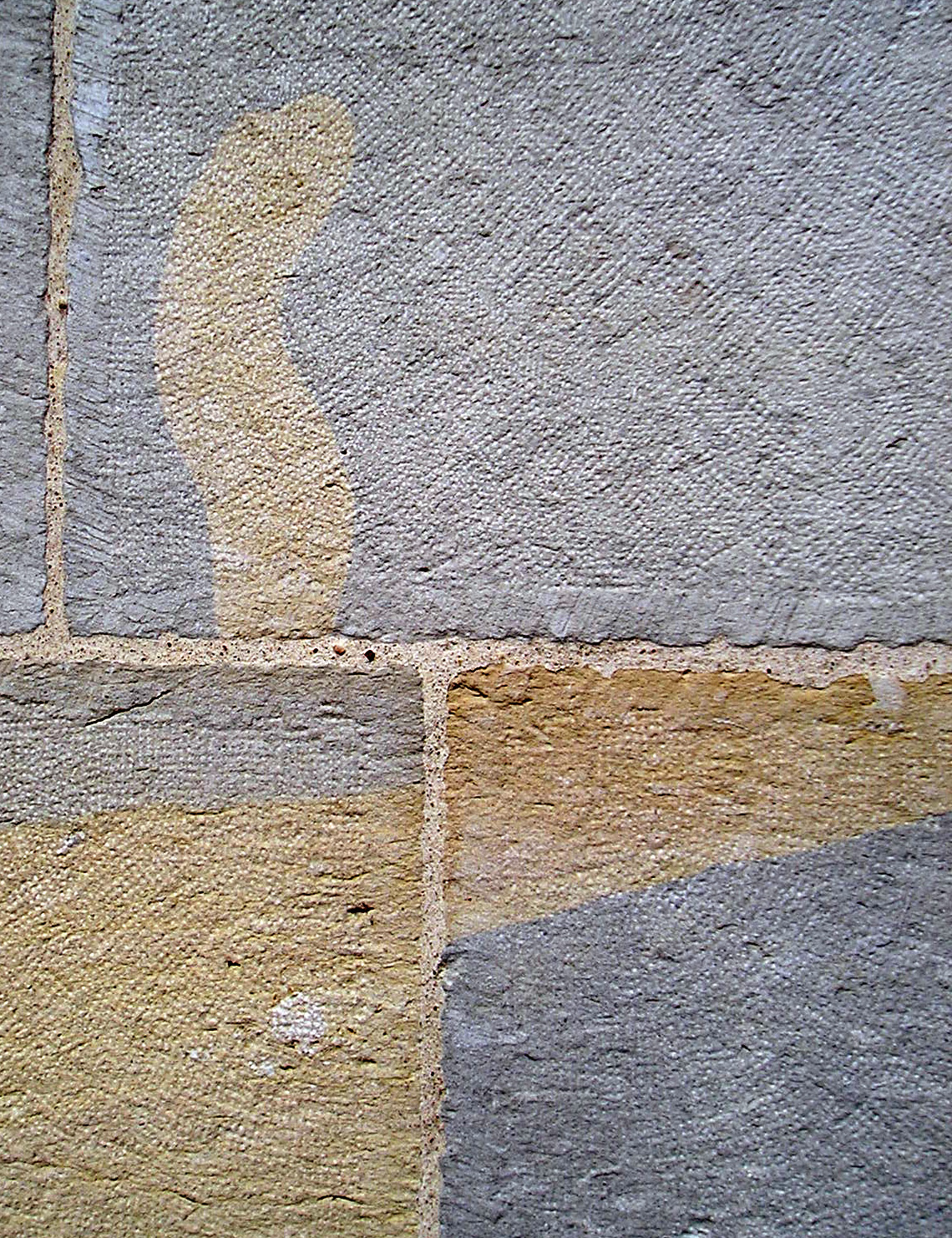
The multicoloured stone from the quarries are used in the buildings of Besançon

- Historically, quarries in Chailluz provided the chalky, blue and beige mottled stone from which the majority of old buildings in the center of Besançon were built.

== Notable sites ==
- Hamlet of the "Grandes Baraques"
- Fort de Chailluz (Fort de la Dame Blanche; Fort of the White Lady)
