= Stockton Island =

Island in Wisconsin, United States

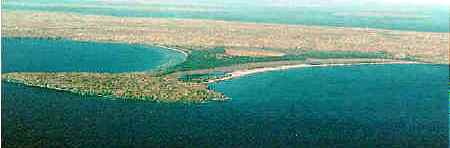
- Aerial view

- Stockton Island in the Wisconsin Stockton Island in the United States Stockton Island in the World

Geography
- Location: Lake Superior
- Coordinates: 46°56′17″N 90°34′43″W

Administration
- United States
- State: Wisconsin
- County: Ashland County

Stockton Islands is also a group of islands north of Alaska.

Stockton Island is one of the Apostle Islands, in Lake Superior, in northern Wisconsin, and is part of the Apostle Islands National Lakeshore.

The largest island included in the national lakeshore, it is host to numerous trails and campsites. The island is known for its unique lagoon ecosystem with multiple carnivorous plants and low bush blueberries, as well as the singing sand found in Julian Bay. Stockton Island also has one of the highest concentration of black bears in North America, with a 2002 study finding 26 bears on the island (0.64 bears/km^{2}). The Trout Point Logging Camp is located on the island.

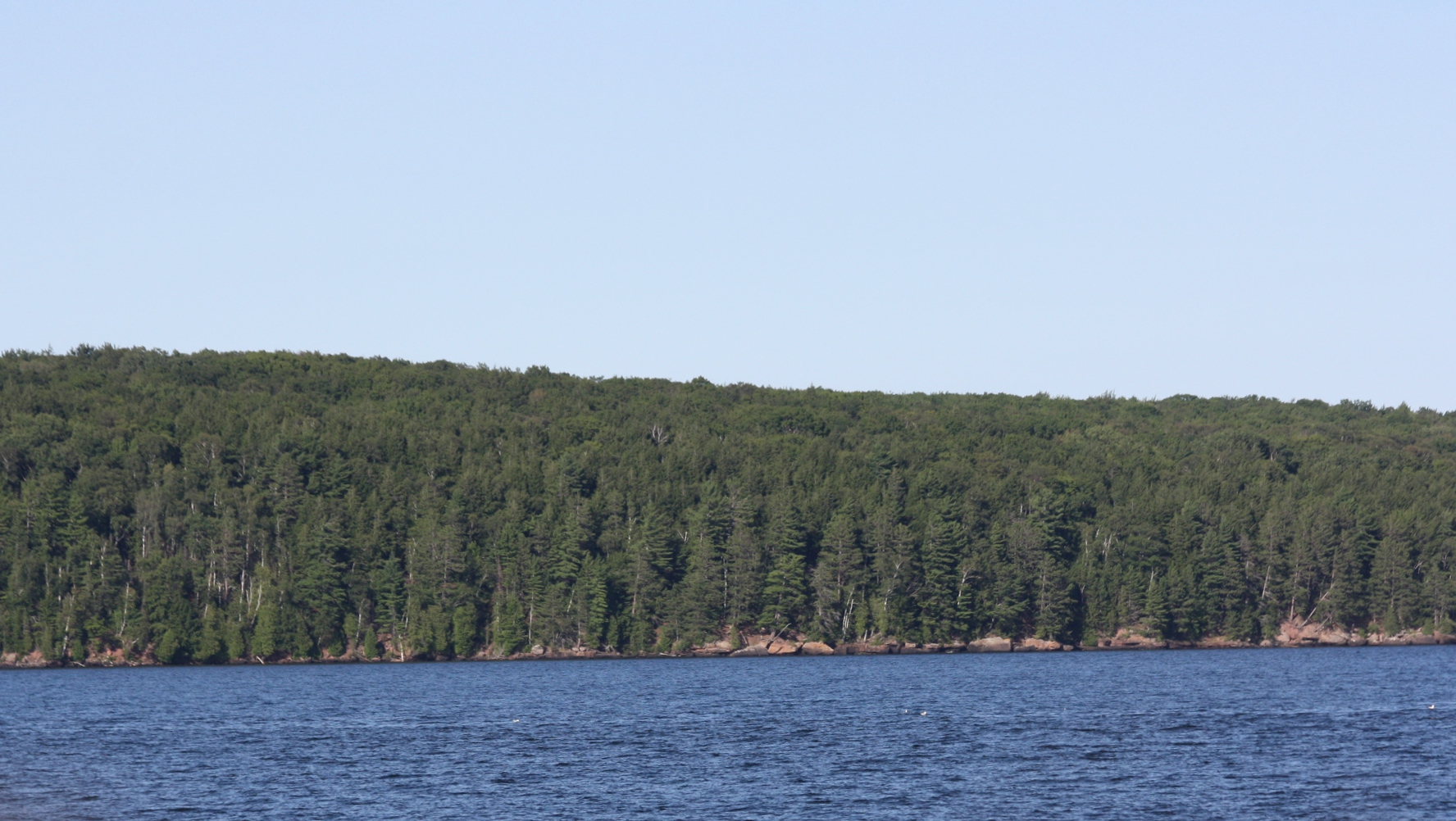
Shore
