= Hokenson Fishing Dock =

- U.S. National Register of Historic Places
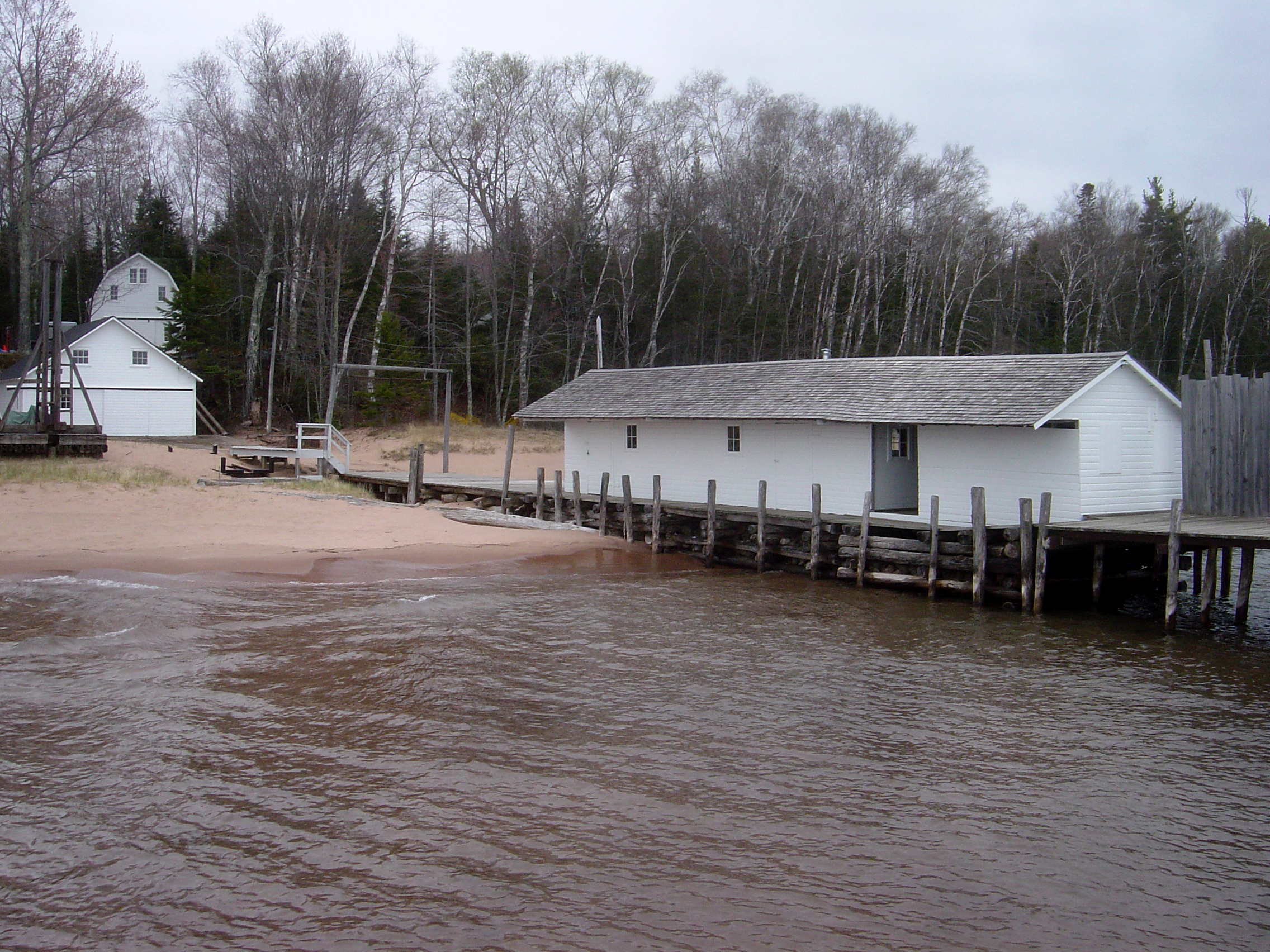
- Hokenson Fishing Dock
- Location: Sand Island
- Nearest city: Bayfield, Wisconsin
- Coordinates: 46°56′48″N 90°53′29″W
- Area: less than one acre
- Built: 1931
- NRHP reference No.: 76000050
- Added to NRHP: June 18, 1976

The Hokenson Fishing Dock is located on Sand Island of the Apostle Islands National Lakeshore.

== History ==
The fishing dock was operated by brothers Leo, Roy and Eskel Hokenson. It was added to the National Register of Historic Places in 1976 and to the Wisconsin State Register of Historical Places in early 1989.
