= Glidden, Wisconsin =

Census-designated place in Wisconsin, United States

- Census-designated place
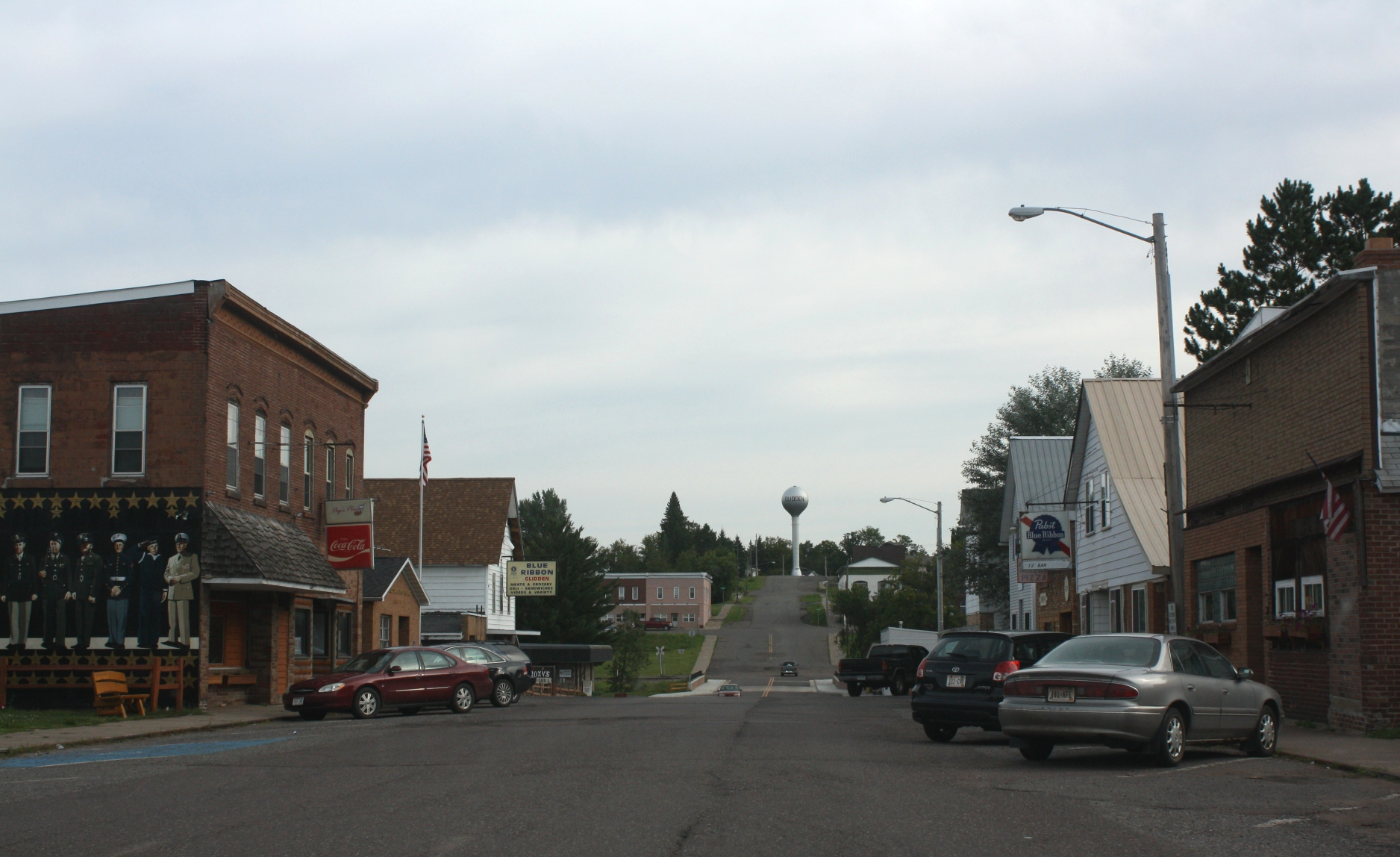
- Looking east at downtown Glidden

- Location within the state of Wisconsin
- Coordinates: 46°8′6″N 90°34′43″W
- Country: United States
- State: Wisconsin
- County: Ashland
- Town: Jacobs

Area
  - Total: 2.151 sq mi (5.57 km^{2})
  - Land: 2.151 sq mi (5.57 km^{2})
  - Water: 0 sq mi (0 km^{2})

Population (2020)
  - Total: 437
  - Density: 203/sq mi (78.4/km^{2})
- Time zone: UTC-6 (Central (CST))
  - Summer (DST): UTC-5 (CDT)
- ZIP codes: 54527
- Area codes: 715 & 534
- GNIS feature ID: 1579335
- Public Transit: Bay Area Rural Transit

Glidden (also Chippewa Crossing) is an unincorporated census-designated place in the town of Jacobs in Ashland County, Wisconsin, United States. It is located on County Highway N near Wisconsin Highway 13. As of the 2020 census, its population was 437, down from 507 at the 2010 census.

== History ==
The community is named after Charles R. Glidden, a founder of the Wisconsin Central Railroad, along which it is located. Marion Park Pavilion was built in 1938 during the depression and is listed in the National Register of Historic Places. In 1963, a 10 ft 7 in (3.23 m), 665-pound (302 kg) Black Bear was hunted in the Glidden area. The town immediately took on the title of "Black Bear Capital of the World", and many local businesses made "Black Bear" a part of their name. Glidden Public School also changed its mascot from the Viking to the Black Bear.

== Geography ==
Glidden is located at 46°8′6″N 90°34′43″W (46.1349525, -90.5785090). According to the U.S. Census Bureau, it has an area of 2.151 square miles (5.57 km^{2}), all land.

== Education ==
Local children are a part of the Chequamegon School District, which was created for the 2009–10 school year. Elementary students of the former Glidden School District - which served all students from the towns of Gordon, Jacobs, Peeksville, and Shanagolden, plus those from parts of the towns of Namakagon and Spider Lake- attend the Glidden campus building. Middle school students attend Chequamegon Middle School, which is also at the Glidden campus. High school students attend Chequamegon High School in Park Falls, Wisconsin.
Glidden Public School was the home to all area students through the 2008–09 school year. The school's mascot was the Black Bear. The school was a part of a sports co-op with the Butternut School District from 2006–09 and won Indianhead Conference championships in baseball (2006) and softball (2009).

== Transportation ==
Bus service to the community is provided by Bay Area Rural Transit.

== Notable person ==
- Franklin Matthias, United States Army officer, was born in Glidden.

== Images ==
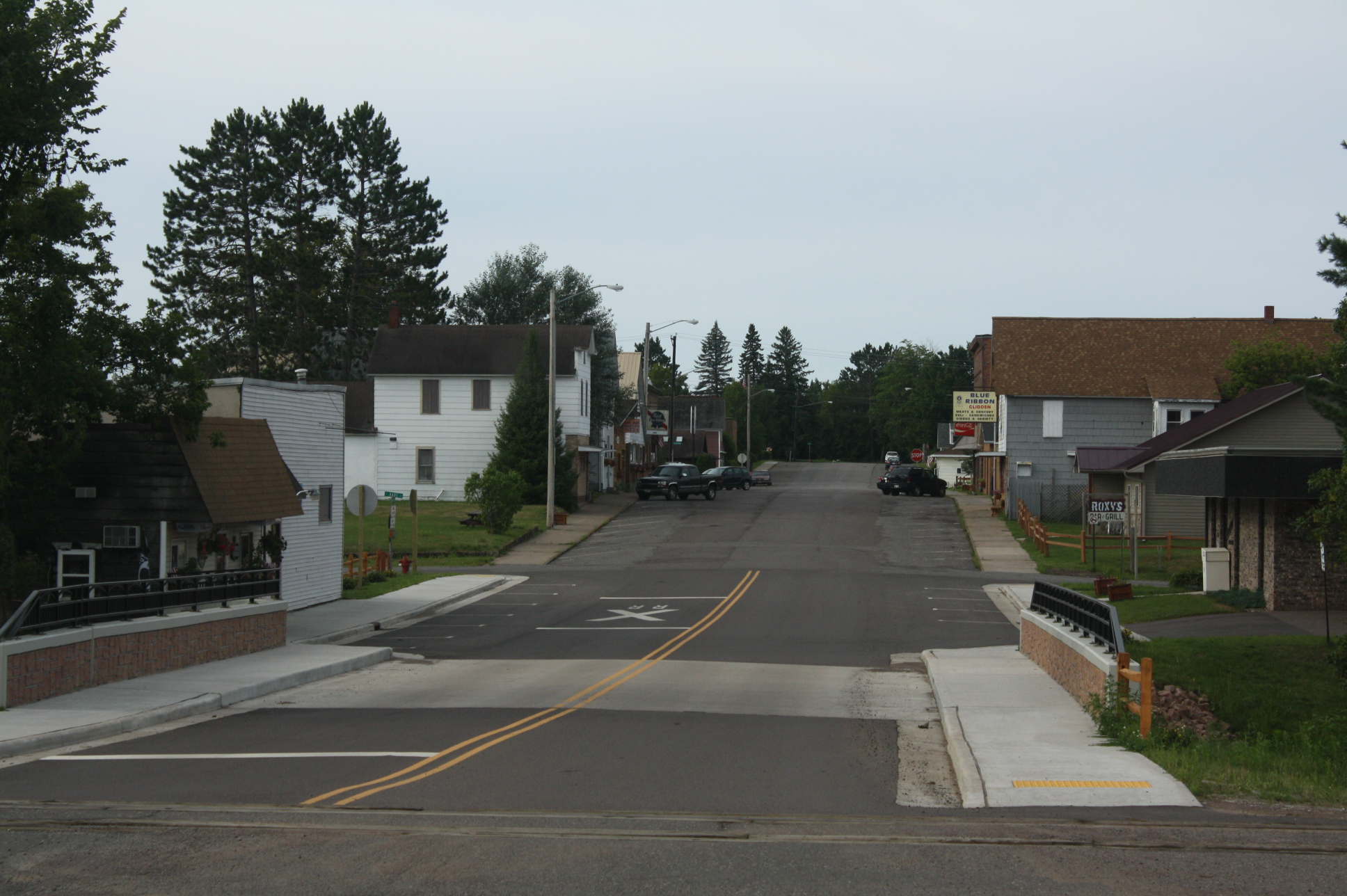
Looking west at downtown Glidden

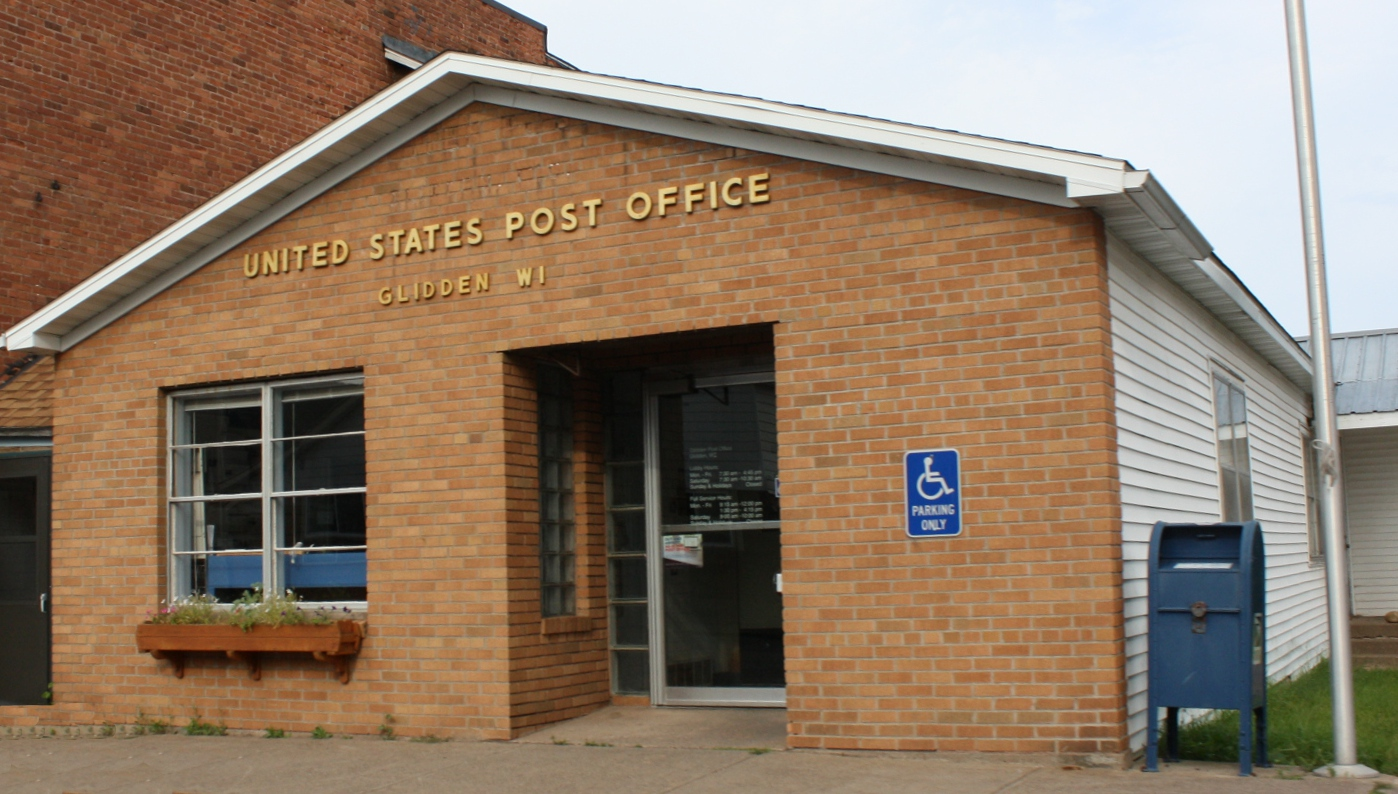
Post office

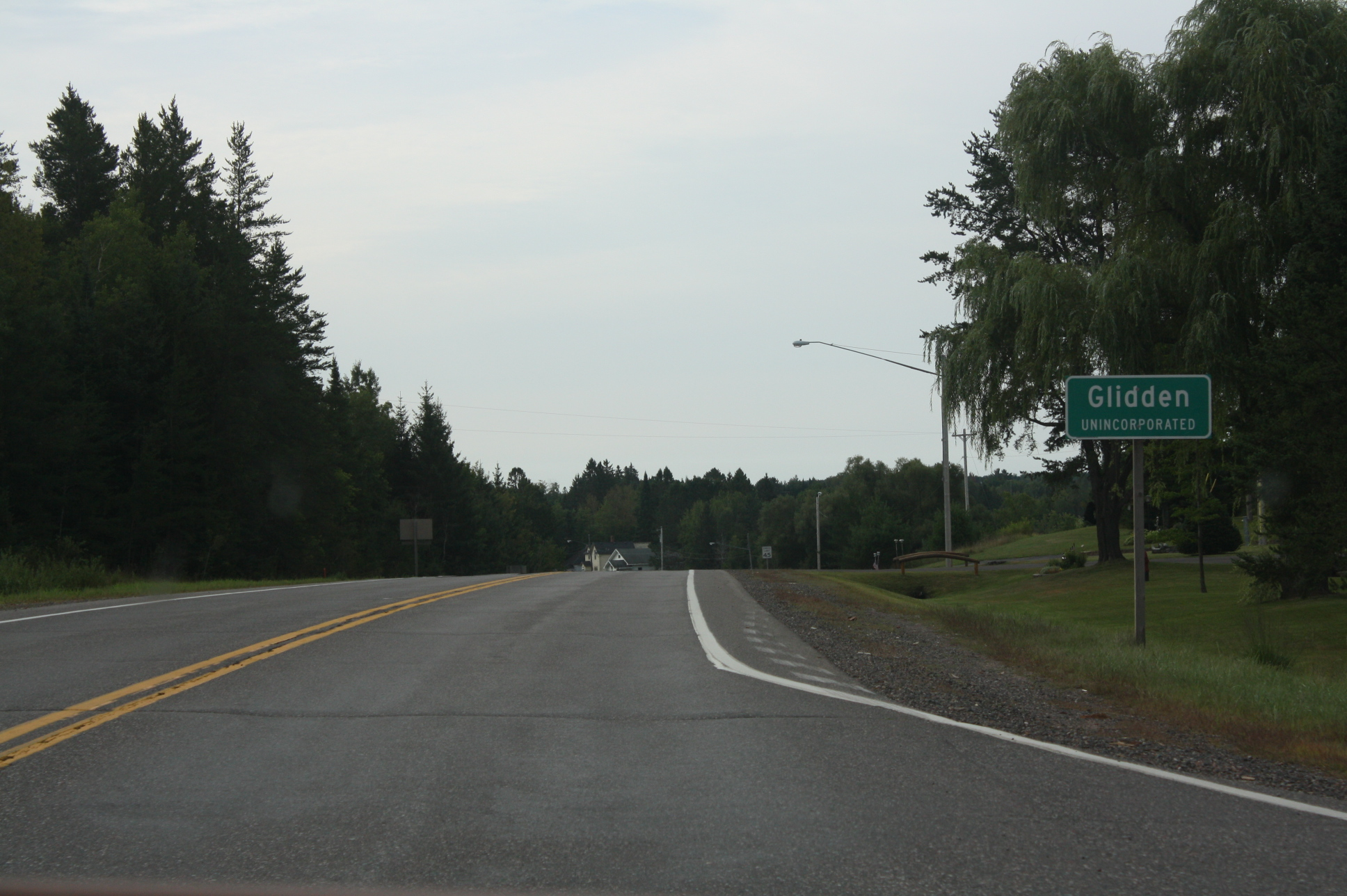
Sign on Wisconsin Highway 13

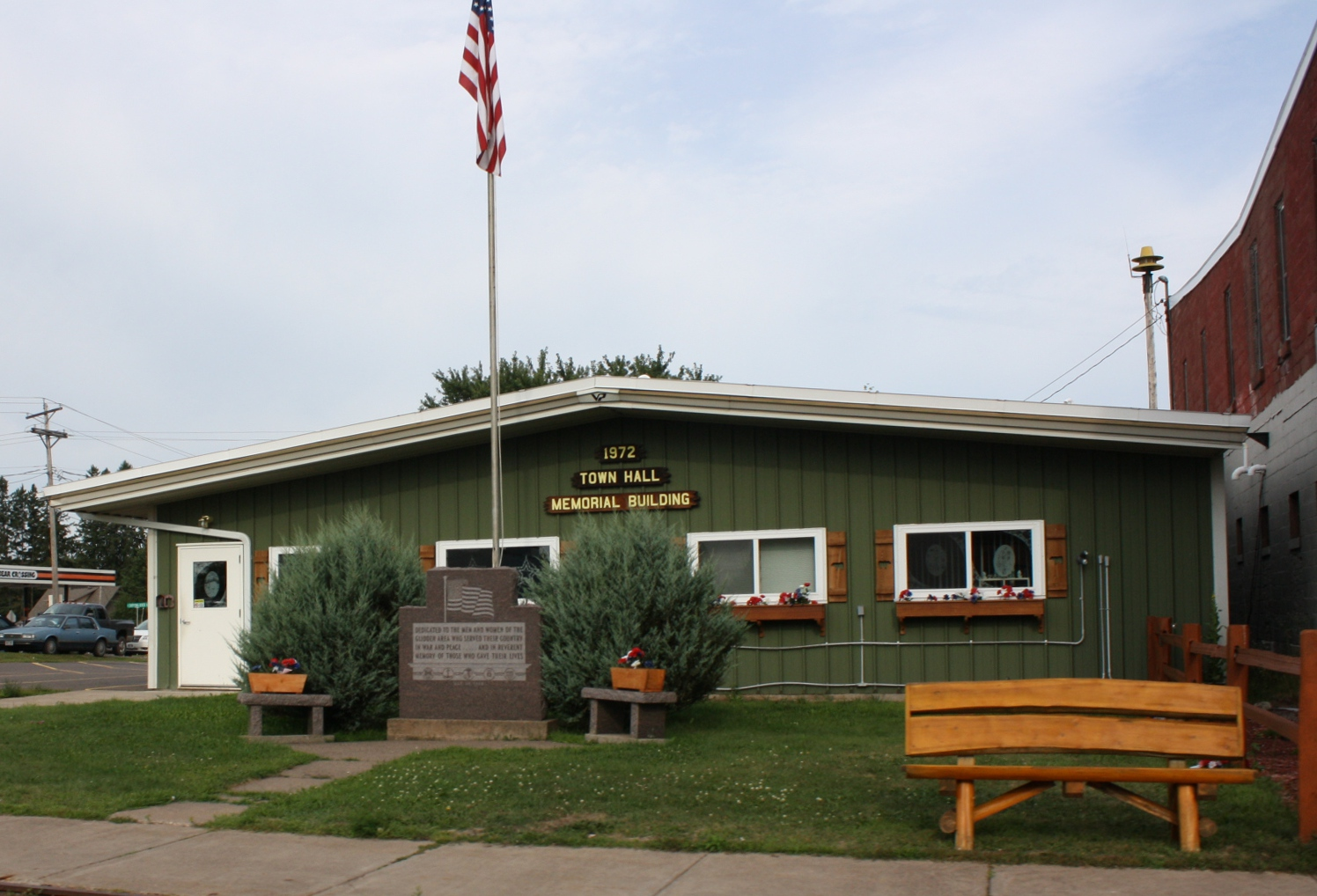
Town hall and memorial building

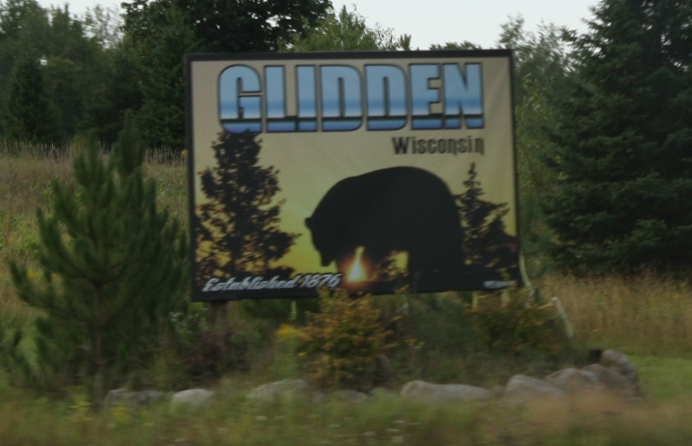
Welcome sign

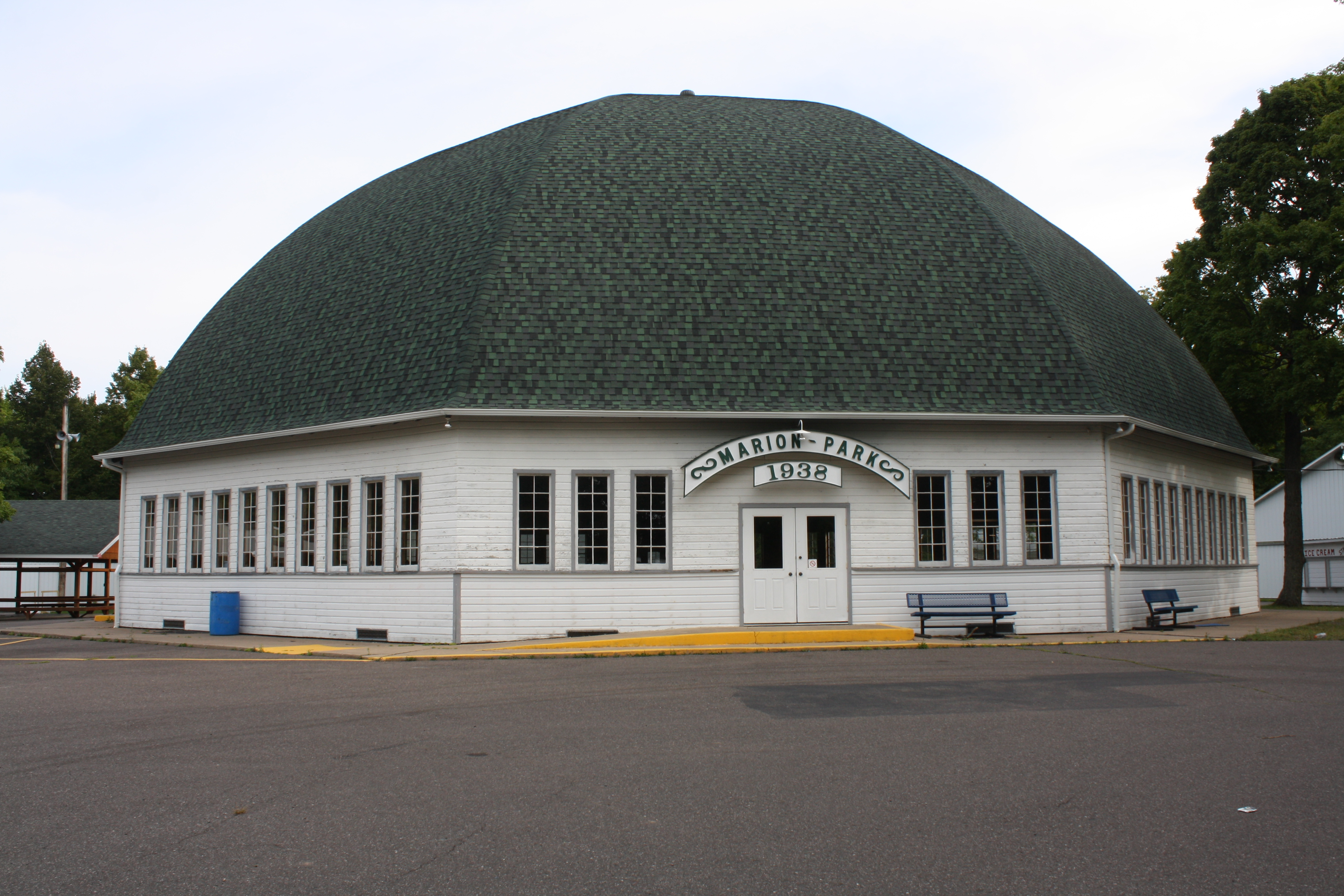
Marion Park Pavilion
