= Trout Point Logging Camp =

- U.S. National Register of Historic Places
- Location: Stockton Island
- Nearest city: Bayfield, Wisconsin
- Area: 1.4 acres (0.57 ha)
- NRHP reference No.: 88002756
- Added to NRHP: December 16, 1988

The Trout Point Logging Camp was in operation from the late 19th century to the 20th century. Located on Stockton Island near Bayfield, Wisconsin, it was added to the National Register of Historic Places in 1988 and the State Register of Historic Places early the following year.

== Background ==
It is an archeological site on the northeast shore of Stockton Island. A 2008 study reported:

The Trout Point logging camp site (47AS218) on the northeast shore of Stockton Island has been investigated more thoroughly than other logging camp sites on the island. Archaeological surveys and test excavations in 1982 showed the Trout Point site to be highly intact with undisturbed features and artifacts in their original contexts. This is in contrast to most mainland logging sites, which have been disturbed by collecting and other activities. The thirty-six features that archaeologists identified at the Trout Point site take the form of a variety of depressions, some of them enclosed by embankments that are the remains of building walls. Buildings that have been identified include a kitchen, dining hall, root cellar, two bunkhouses with space for fifty-six men in each, filer’s shack, and office/store. The buildings were constructed of logs, and nails, window glass, and hardware have been found in association with their remains. Other features include a well, privies, trash pits, and drainage ditches. Many artifacts from the site relate to preparing, serving, eating, and storing food including bottles, jars, table settings, pitchers, and stove fragments. Animal bones show that the loggers ate more beef than pork. Personal items range from buttons to part of a harmonica. Numerous tobacco tins and snuff cans attest to extensive use of these substances. Tools were too expensive to leave behind; the few examples found include a cant hook, saw, and wedge. Artifact dates indicate occupation of the camp between ca. 1912–20, which correlates with the historical record. The planned layout of the camp suggests that most of it was constructed at one time. Archaeological evidence dates this construction to ca. 1912 and indicates that the camp was occupied for several seasons. The Trout Point logging camp has been listed in the National Register of Historic Places for the wealth of information that it holds on an important phase of logging in the Lake Superior region.
