= Rocky Island Historic District =

Historic district in Wisconsin, United States

- U.S. National Register of Historic Places
- U.S. Historic district
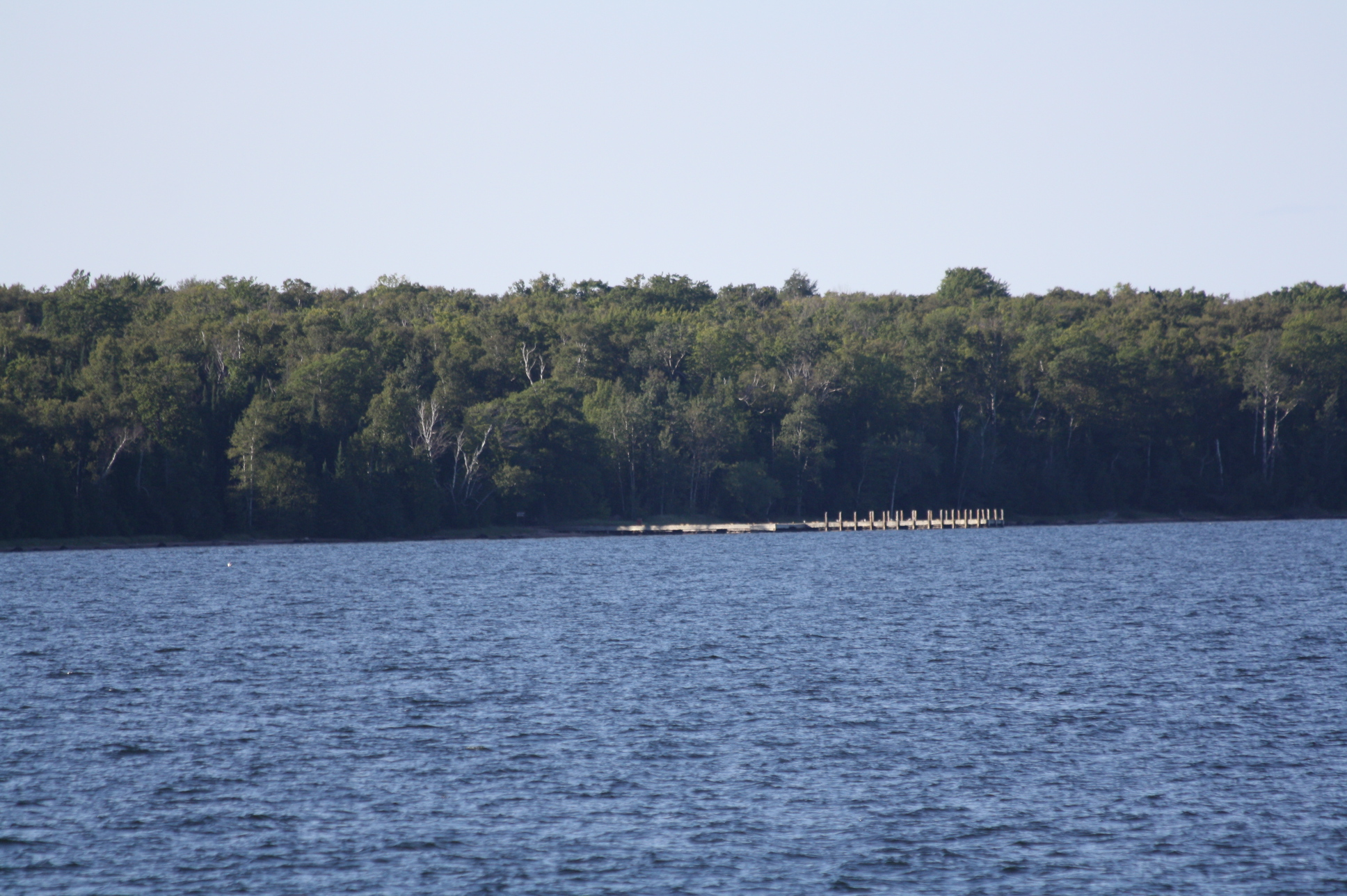

- Location within Wisconsin Location within the United States
- Nearest city: La Pointe, Wisconsin
- Coordinates: 47°2′45″N 90°39′58″W
- Area: 13.7 acres (5.5 ha)
- Built by: Olaf Edwards; Christian Hadland; Charlie & Fred Benson; Julian Nelson; Mel & Martin Erickson
- Architectural style: Utilitarian, Balloon Frame
- NRHP reference No.: 08000016
- Added to NRHP: July 3, 2008

The Rocky Island Historic District is a historic district in the Apostle Islands in Ashland County, Wisconsin. It is composed of the Hadland, Benson, Edwards, Nelson, and Erickson fish camps, which were located on the eastern shore of Rocky Island. The district represents the historical significance of commercial fishing on Lake Superior, which was primarily conducted by Scandinavian immigrants. The Rocky Island Historic District was added to the National Register of Historic Places on July 3, 2008.

Builders of the camps were Olaf Edwards, Christian Hadland, Charlie & Fred Benson, Julian Nelson, Mel & Martin Erickson, and others.
