= Manitou Camp =

United States Historic Place in Wisconsin

- U.S. National Register of Historic Places
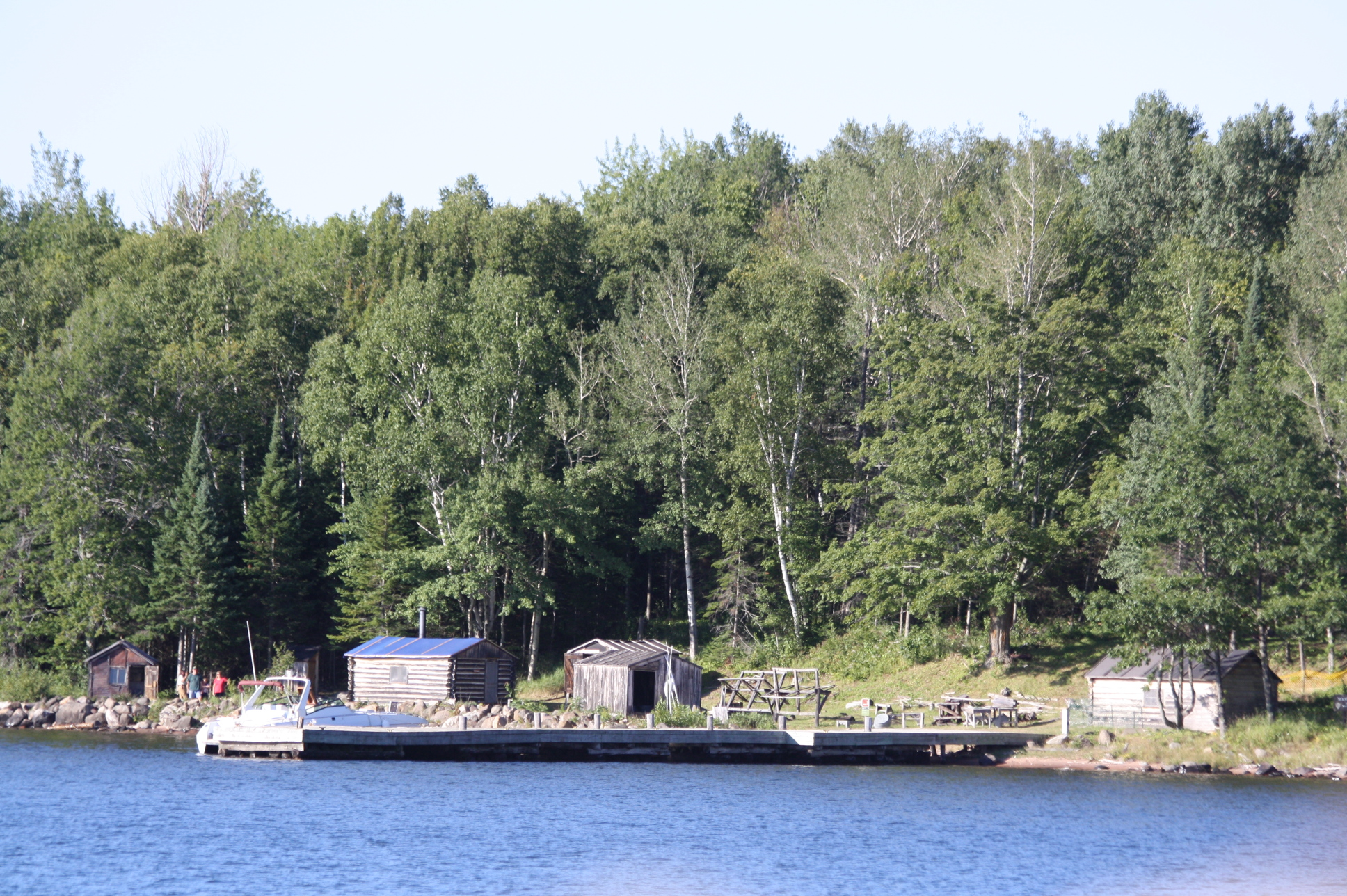

- Location within Wisconsin Location within the United States
- Location: Manitou Island, Apostle Islands National Lakeshore, Wisconsin
- Coordinates: 46°57′20″N 90°40′35″W
- Area: 2.9 acres (1.2 ha)
- Built: 1890
- Architect: Multiple; Olson, Hjalmer
- Architectural style: Scandinavian Log Cabin
- NRHP reference No.: 83003367
- Added to NRHP: January 19, 1983

Manitou Camp is a logging and fishing camp started in the 1890s on Manitou Island, part of the Apostle Islands National Lakeshore. Historically, Manitou Camp was used as a campground and as a facility for fishing. It has been listed on the National Register of Historic Places since 1983 and is owned by the National Park Service.

In the 1890s four Swedes who were cutting cedar on the island built a cabin in a northern European style. Their cabin remains at the camp to this day, built of cedar logs hand-flattened on two sides, joined with half-dove-tailed notches, chinked with moss, with a small cellar beneath a trapdoor in the floor. When the Swedes finished logging three of them left, but John Hanson stayed on.

Hanson fished year-round, smoked meat, gardened, and had a horse on this remote island. He built a twine shed which remains. He was joined by a Frenchman, Gus Plud. In the 1920s or 1930s Frank Childs built a cabin there and fished in the winter with a man named Black Pete. In the early 1930s John Hanson built a smokehouse for smoking herring and venison. Later a Captain Bark winter-fished from the camp.

One objective of these fishermen was the November–December herring run. The herring were cleaned and salted right at Manitou camp, then packed into barrels for transport to Bayfield. After the lake froze, the fishermen drove dogsleds out over the ice. They hung gill nets on lines and poles under the ice and after a day or two, collected a catch of whitefish and lake trout. (One wooden fish sled remains at the camp.)

In the 1930s two Norwegian brothers, Theodore and Hjalmer Olson, fished out of Manitou Camp in winters. In 1938 they bought the camp and lived there year-round. They constructed a 14 by 18 foot log bunkhouse in a Scandinavian style, which remains, and a twine shed for storing fishing nets. The Olsons rented cabins to loggers and fishermen, and lived at Manitou camp at least into the 1980s.

Around camp there are also a couple old outhouses, a handmade windlass, boat skids, the remains of a pier, handmade fish boxes, a net reel, a net fork, tarring tank, gutting board, and salt barrels. These remnants of the fishing industry remain where they were used and left. That they were not cleaned up and redeveloped like the valuable land around most docks is what makes Manitou Camp unique in the area.
