= Hadland Fishing Camp =

- U.S. National Register of Historic Places
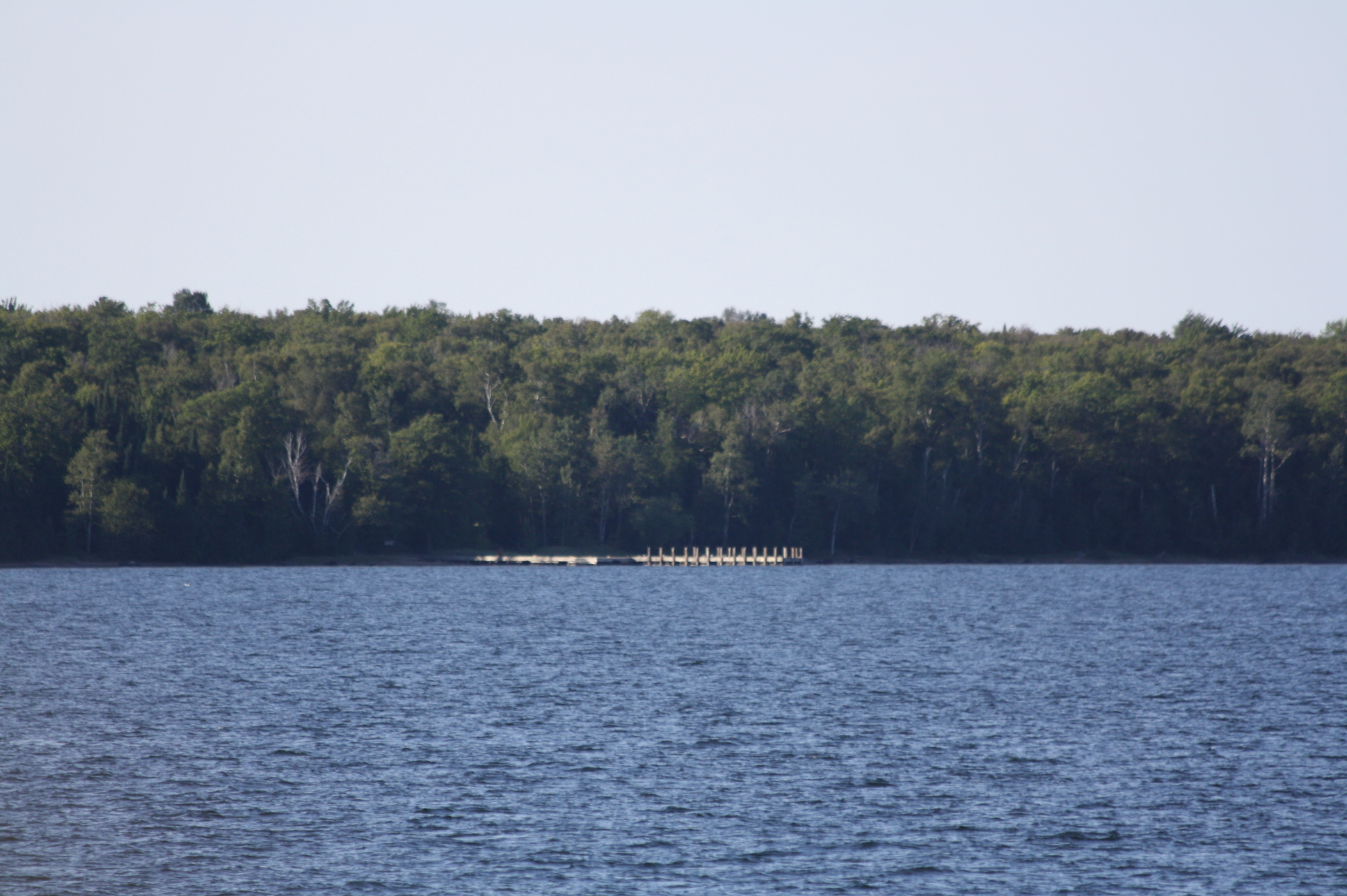

- Location within Wisconsin Location within the United States
- Nearest city: La Pointe, Wisconsin
- Coordinates: 47°2′38″N 90°39′57″W
- Area: 2.8 acres (1.1 ha)
- Built: 1938
- Built by: John Freed, Christian Hadland
- NRHP reference No.: 77000146
- Added to NRHP: August 18, 1977

The Hadland Fishing Camp is a historic fishing camp in the Apostle Islands of Ashland County, Wisconsin. Built in 1938, the camp is located on the eastern shore of Rocky Island and is part of the Rocky Island Historic District. It was added to the National Register of Historic Places on August 18, 1977.

Christian Hadland emigrated from Egersund, Norway, in 1905 and fished with his brother from a camp on Outer Island. In 1938 he moved his operations to this site on Rocky Island. Each year he net-fished from late spring until bad weather in the fall. Mrs. Hadland and their children joined him on the island each summer and returned to the mainland when school resumed. As many as eight hired hands also lived on the island at times. Hadland's sons Clifford and Harvey still fished from the island at least into the 1970s.

The site includes a log cabin that Hadland built in 1920 in the French piece-sur-piece style on Outer Island, then moved to Rocky Island in 1938. There are also other cabins, a shed for storing nets, an ice house, gill net winders, and drying frames.
