= Bass Island Brownstone Company Quarry =

- U.S. National Register of Historic Places
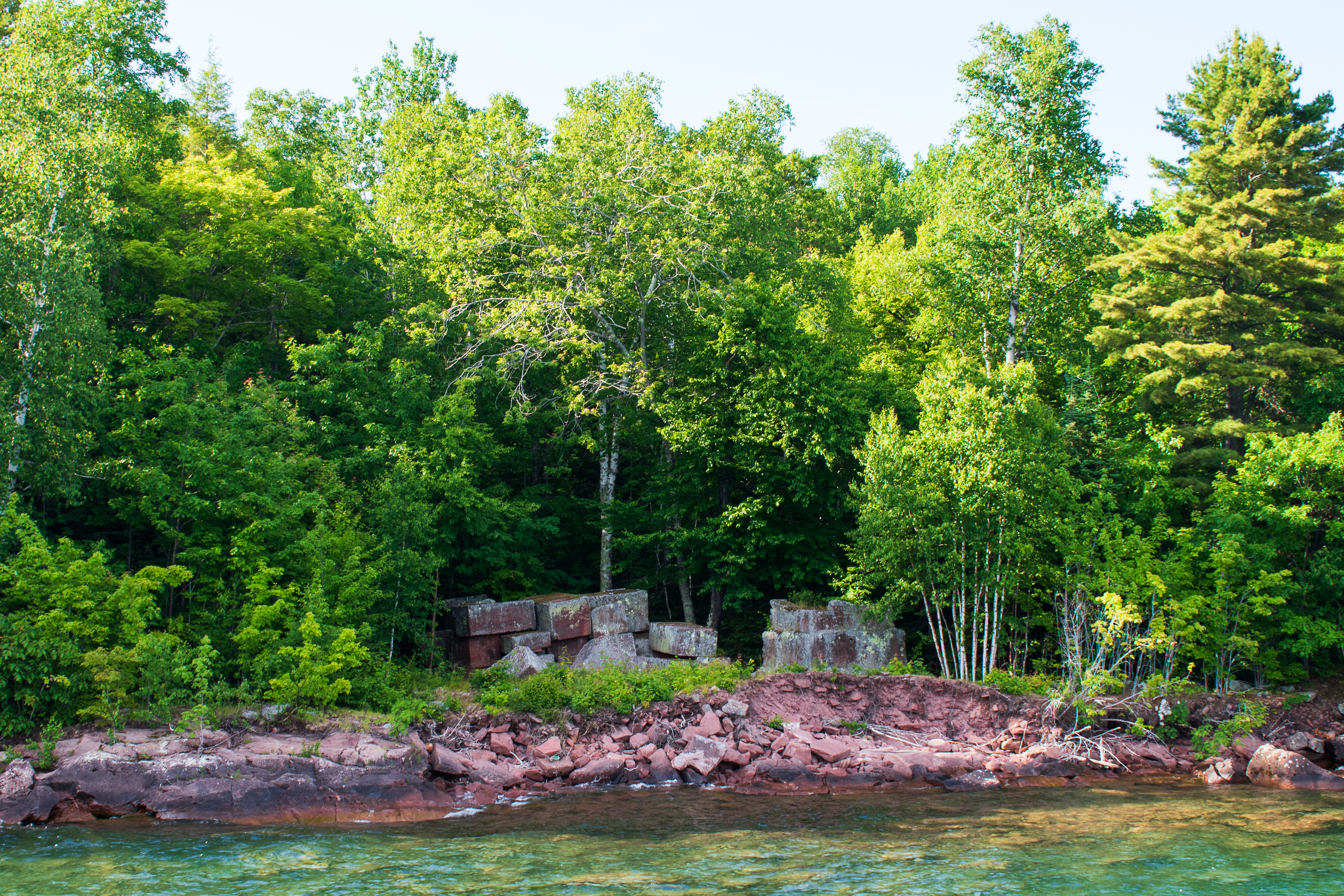
- Stone blocks from Bass Island Brownstone Quarry

- Location within Wisconsin Location within the United States
- Nearest city: La Pointe, Wisconsin
- Coordinates: 46°49′56″N 90°45′20″W
- Area: 9.7 acres (3.9 ha)
- Built: 1893
- Built by: Sweet, Almson
- NRHP reference No.: 78000075 (original); 16000241 (increase)

Significant dates
- Added to NRHP: March 29, 1978
- Boundary increase: May 10, 2016

The Bass Island Brownstone Company Quarry, also known as the Basswood Island Quarry, on Basswood Island in Lake Superior was operational from 1868 to 1893. The brownstone was first used for construction of the second Milwaukee County Courthouse, now demolished. The quarry, now filled with water, is about 200 feet (61 m) long and about 25 feet (7.6 m) deep. Blocks of sandstone remain, together with the rusting remains of quarrying machinery. All company buildings and workers' cabins have disappeared.

Other buildings built with the quarry's product include the old Chicago Tribune building, the Landmark Chapel at the Forest Home Cemetery and St. Paul's Episcopal Church, both in Milwaukee. The island and quarry are presently included in Apostle Islands National Lakeshore and are administered by the National Park Service. The quarry was placed on the National Register of Historic Places on March 29, 1978.
