= National Register of Historic Places listings in Bayfield County, Wisconsin =

Location of Bayfield County in Wisconsin

This is a list of the National Register of Historic Places listings in Bayfield County, Wisconsin. It is intended to provide a comprehensive listing of entries in the National Register of Historic Places that are located in Bayfield County, Wisconsin. The locations of National Register properties for which the latitude and longitude coordinates are included below may be seen in a map.

There are 26 properties and districts listed on the National Register in the county. Another 2 properties were once listed but have been removed.

This National Park Service list is complete through NPS recent listings posted June 26, 2026.

== Current listings ==
	Name on the Register	Image	Date listed	Location	City or town	Description
1	Apostle Islands Lighthouses	Apostle Islands Lighthouses	March 8, 1977 (#77000145)	N and E of Bayfield on Michigan, Raspberry, Outer, Sand and Devils Islands; 46°59′38″N 90°36′06″W	Bayfield	Six lighthouses built on various islands as early as 1856, to guide ships through and around the islands.
2	Bank of Washburn	Bank of Washburn	January 17, 1980 (#80000105)	Bayfield St. and Central Ave. 46°40′24″N 90°53′29″W	Washburn	Monumental building designed by Conover and Porter in Romanesque style and built in 1890, of brownstone quarried north of Washburn. Now houses historical museum and cultural center.
3	Bayfield County Courthouse	Bayfield County Courthouse	January 17, 1975 (#75000060)	117 E. 5th St. 46°40′37″N 90°53′34″W	Washburn	Courthouse designed by James Nader of Madison in Neoclassical revival style and built in 1894 of locally quarried brownstone.
4	Bayfield Fish Hatchery	Bayfield Fish Hatchery	July 22, 1981 (#81000033)	WI State Highway 13; 46°47′10″N 90°51′49″W	Salmo	R. D. Pike operated a private fish hatchery on this site from the 1860s to 1895, when he donated the land to the state. The state built a new hatchery, with the gambrel-roofed Victorian building holding an office, living quarters, and a fish egg propagation area washed by the waters of Birch Run Creek.
5	Bayfield Historic District	Bayfield Historic District	November 25, 1980 (#80000106)	WI J and WI 13; 46°48′43″N 90°49′07″W	Bayfield	A 60-block area in the city of Bayfield, encompassing commercial buildings from wooden false front to brownstone, and residences from modest to Queen Anne.
6	Booth Cooperage	Booth Cooperage	August 13, 1976 (#76000049)	1 East Washington St. 46°48′45″N 90°48′47″W	Bayfield	Built as a fish storehouse around 1900, partly on cribbing. In 1914, Booth Fisheries converted part of the building to a factory in which five coopers hand-made wooden barrels - up to 75,000 a year - for packing locally caught salted fish.
7	Frank Boutin, Jr. House	Frank Boutin, Jr. House	December 27, 1974 (#74000056)	7 Rice St. 46°48′50″N 90°48′50″W	Bayfield	Queen Anne home built in 1908 with exterior of sandstone, brick and clapboard. Boutin's father was an early lumberman and fisherman in Bayfield.
8	Christ Episcopal Church	Christ Episcopal Church	December 27, 1974 (#74000057)	121-125 North 3rd. St. 46°48′47″N 90°49′08″W	Bayfield	The chapel was built in 1870, the first Episcopal church in northern Wisconsin. The whole is in Carpenter Gothic style, with board and batten exterior.
9	East Third Street Residential Historic District	East Third Street Residential Historic District	July 18, 2014 (#14000430)	E. 3rd St. from Central Ave. to 4th Ave. E. 46°40′32″N 90°53′22″W	Washburn	31 contributing homes built from 1885 through 1950 including Colonial Revival style, Queen Anne, Prairie School, and Craftsman. Some were constructed by DuPont for employees who worked at its Barksdale explosives plant.
10	Forest Lodge	Forest Lodge	February 14, 2002 (#02000031)	Garmisch Rd. 46°12′13″N 91°06′31″W	Namakagon	Rustic retreat of the Livingston/Griggs family of St. Paul on Namekagon Lake, on the site of a logging camp. Buildings constructed from 1893 to 1950 include the lodge, two-story boathouse, and maid's cabin.
11	Forest Lodge Library	Forest Lodge Library	July 11, 2001 (#01000735)	13450 Cty Hwy M 46°12′28″N 91°17′30″W	Cable	St. Paul socialite Mary Livingston Griggs built this Rustic log building in 1925-26 for the community of Cable, in honor of her mother and their family lodge on Namekagon Lake.
12	Herbster Community Center	Herbster Community Center	August 15, 1997 (#97000888)	Lenawee Rd., S of jct. of Lenawee Rd. and WI 13; 46°49′51″N 91°15′44″W	Herbster	Town hall/gymnasium/community center constructed in Rustic style in 1939-40, a WPA project.
13	Hokenson Fishing Dock	Hokenson Fishing Dock	June 18, 1976 (#76000050)	N of Bayfield at Little Sand Bay; 46°56′48″N 90°53′30″W	Bayfield	Dock built on crib piers in 1927 by the three Hokensen brothers, who ran an independent fishing boat and packing operation out of Sand Island from the 1920s to the 1950s.
14	Island Lake Camp		March 12, 1982 (#82000629)	Island Lake Rd. 46°23′11″N 91°31′50″W	Drummond	Rustic log cabin built in 1888, summer retreat of the McCormick family and Dr. William Gray, newspaperman and editor of "The Interior," a Presbyterian publication.
15	Lake Owen Archeological District	Lake Owen Archeological District	October 11, 2012 (#12000333)	Address Restricted	Drummond vicinity	
16	Old Bayfield County Courthouse	Old Bayfield County Courthouse	December 27, 1974 (#74000058)	Washington St. between 4th and 5th Sts. 46°48′47″N 90°49′14″W	Bayfield	Built in 1884 of local brownstone with elements of Neoclassical and Romanesque Revival styles, served as county courthouse until 1892, when Washburn snatched the county seat. Later used as school, German POW camp, community center, and warehouse. Now headquarters for the Apostle Islands National Lakeshore.
17	Ottawa (Tug) Shipwreck Site	Ottawa (Tug) Shipwreck Site	June 8, 1992 (#92000594)	northern edge of Red Cliff Bay; 46°53′00″N 90°45′49″W	Russell	151-foot tugboat built in Chicago in 1881 that first towed rafts of logs across Lake Michigan. In November 1909, after helping free a grounded steamship, she mysteriously caught fire in the night, burned and sank.
18	John and Justina Palo Homestead		September 12, 2002 (#02001007)	71055 Muskeg Rd. 46°36′19″N 91°28′12″W	Oulu	Log house and outbuildings, including sauna, built from 1910 to 1949 by Finnish immigrant farmers.
19	Pureair Sanatorium	Pureair Sanatorium	August 20, 1981 (#81000034)	S of Bayfield; 46°47′27″N 90°50′50″W	Bayfield	Tuberculosis sanatorium, built from 1918 to 1923 before antibiotics, when TB was called consumption and treatment consisted of isolation, rest, and fresh air. Also called the Tri-County Sanatorium because it was shared by Bayfield, Ashland and Iron counties.
20	Sevona (Bulk Carrier) Shipwreck Site	Sevona (Bulk Carrier) Shipwreck Site	April 9, 1993 (#93000229)	north of Sand Island; 47°00′24″N 90°54′32″W	Bayfield	372 foot steel steamer, built 1890 in Bay City, Michigan. Caught by a nor-easter on Sept 2, 1905, running from West Superior for Erie with 6000 tons of iron ore. Tried to shelter in Apostle Islands but ran aground on shoals north of Sand Island. Seven died - 16 escaped in lifeboats.
21	Sevona Cabin	Sevona Cabin	September 29, 1976 (#76000051)	N of Bayfield on Sand Island; 46°57′49″N 90°56′14″W	Bayfield	Cottage built partly from salvage from the nearby Sevona shipwreck in its memory by Samuel Fifield, an Ashland businessman and lieutenant governor of Wisconsin.
22	Shaw Farm		June 18, 1976 (#76000052)	Sand Island; 46°57′47″N 90°56′03″W	Bayfield	Francis Shaw received land on Sand Island for his Civil War service and built a cabin in 1871, the first permanent home on the island. For 50 years he and the next generation fished and farmed, and later ran a workshop and a store, serving as the social center of the island.
23	Shaw Point Historic District		July 27, 2020 (#100005371)	Sand Island; 46°57′48″N 90°56′02″W	Bayfield	Group of historic buildings on Sand Island: Shaw Hill farm, an early fishing camp and farm; Camp Stella resort; and the Campbell-Jensch summer cottage.
24	Thomas Friant shipwreck (gill net tug)	Thomas Friant shipwreck (gill net tug)	November 18, 2019 (#100004627)	13 miles (21 km) southeast of Two Harbors, Minnesota; 46°52′00″N 91°29′00″W	Port Wing vicinity	Built in 1884 by Duncan Robertson in Grand Haven, the 96-foot wooden steam screw initially operated as a ferry on the Grand River before moving out to Lake Michigan. In 1908 she burned to the waterline in Sault Ste. Marie. Rebuilt as a fish tug in 1911. Sank off Two Harbors in January 1924, damaged by ice.
25	Washburn Public Library	Washburn Public Library	March 1, 1984 (#84003621)	Washington Ave. and W. 3rd St. 46°40′22″N 90°53′43″W	Washburn	Carnegie library, designed by Henry Wildhagen and built in Neoclassical style in 1904. Still in use!
25	West Bay Club		July 28, 2015 (#14000385)	Sand Island; 46°58′19″N 90°58′35″W	Bayfield	Rustic-styled clubhouse designed by Buechner & Orth and built in 1913 for hay fever sufferers from St. Paul.

== Former listings ==
	Name on the Register	Image	Date listed	Date removed	Location	City or town	Description
1	Reiten Boatyard		May 13, 1982 (#82000630)	June 15, 1984	Broad St. on The Waterfront	Bayfield	Boneyard of lake-going wooden boats, docks and engines, demolished in 1984.
2	South Shore Public School		November 15, 1978 (#78003443)	July 16, 1980	Grand Ave. and WI 13	Port Wing	Known as the "Big White School"

== See also ==
- List of National Historic Landmarks in Wisconsin
- National Register of Historic Places listings in Wisconsin
- Listings in neighboring counties: Ashland, Douglas, Sawyer, Washburn
