= Oulu (disambiguation) =

Oulu is a city in North Ostrobothnia, Finland.

Oulu may also refer to:

== Places ==
=== Finland ===
- Oulu (parliamentary electoral district)
- Oulu Airport
- Oulu Province, one of the provinces of Finland (Oulun lääni/Uleåborgs län)
- Oulu railway station
- Oulujärvi, a lake
- Oulujoki, a river
- Port of Oulu
- University of Oulu, a university located in Oulu

=== United States ===
- Oulu, Wisconsin, a town
  - Oulu (community), Wisconsin, an unincorporated community

== Other uses ==
- 1512 Oulu (1939 FE), an asteroid
