= Big Top Chautauqua =

Performing arts center in Wisconsin, USA

- Interactive map of Big Top Chautauqua
- Address: 84810 State Hwy 13; Bayfield, Wisconsin; United States
- Coordinates: 46°46′40″N 90°53′32″W
- Capacity: 900
- Type: performing arts center
- Public transit: Bay Area Rural Transit

Construction
- Opened: 1986

Website
- www.bigtop.org

The Lake Superior Big Top Chautauqua is a 900-seat music venue and performing arts center, located near Bayfield, Wisconsin. It is an all-canvas tent-theater which has operated since 1986, primarily during the summer, and has hosted such entertainers as Johnny Cash, Willie Nelson, Loretta Lynn, B.B. King, Merle Haggard, Emmylou Harris, Joan Baez and Lyle Lovett.

The venue is known for its characteristic blue canvas tent, which is set up annually during the summer at the base of the Mount Ashwabay Ski Hill, three miles south of Bayfield.

Operated as a nonprofit organization, some goals of the venue are to showcase local and regional performers, present internationally acclaimed artists, and present original musical theater with a historical and local element. A weekly network radio program, Tent Show Radio, is broadcast by radio stations across the country. Each one-hour program features digitally recorded highlights from the previous summer season at the tent.
