= Forest Lodge =

Forest Lodge may refer to:

== Australia ==
- Forest Lodge, New South Wales

== United Kingdom ==
- Forest Lodge, Windsor, an 18th century Georgian manor in Windsor, currently the home to William and Kate, the Prince of Wales and Princess of Wales and their family.

== United States ==
- Forest Lodge (Upton, Maine), listed on the National Register of Historic Places in Oxford County, Maine
- Forest Lodge (Namakagon, Wisconsin), listed on the National Register of Historic Places in Bayfield County, Wisconsin
