= Bayfield Historic District =

Historic district in Wisconsin, United States

- U.S. National Register of Historic Places
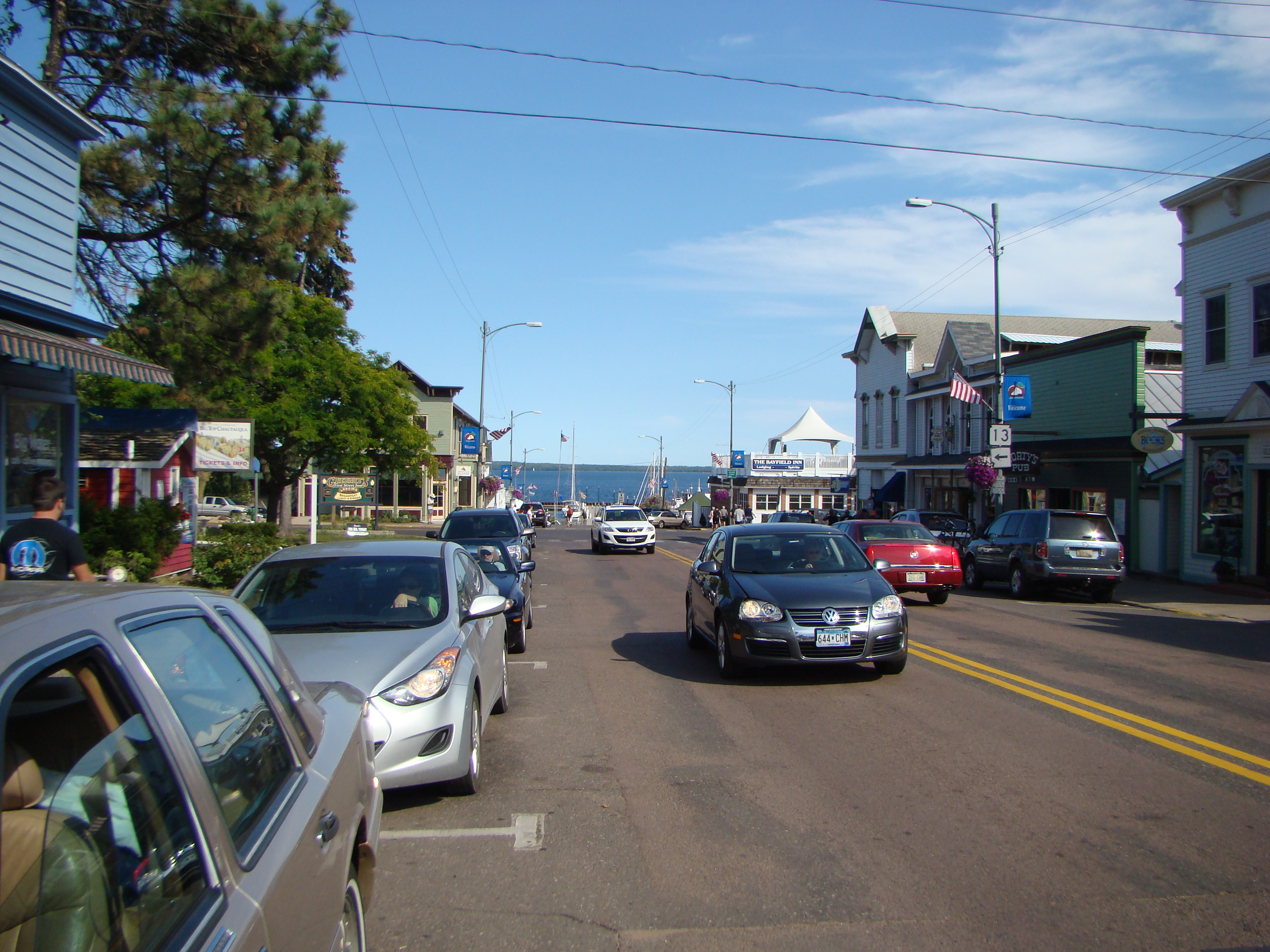
- A portion of the Bayfield Historic District.

- Location within Wisconsin Location within the United States
- Location: Bayfield, Wisconsin
- Coordinates: 46°48′43″N 90°49′07″W
- NRHP reference No.: 80000106
- Added to NRHP: November 25, 1980

The Bayfield Historic District is an area spanning 60 blocks in Bayfield, Wisconsin. It was added to the National Register of Historic Places in 1980.
