= Salmo, Wisconsin =

- Unincorporated community
- Location within Wisconsin Location within the United States
- Coordinates: 46°46′53″N 90°51′55″W
- Country: United States
- State: Wisconsin
- County: Bayfield
- Town: Bayfield
- Elevation: 620 ft (190 m)
- Time zone: UTC-6 (Central (CST))
  - Summer (DST): UTC-5 (CDT)
- Area codes: 715 and 534
- GNIS feature ID: 1573636

Salmo is an unincorporated community in Bayfield County, Wisconsin, United States.

Wisconsin Highway 13 serves as a main route in the community. Salmo is located three miles southwest of the city of Bayfield, in the town of Bayfield.

The community is also located 19 miles north of the city of Ashland.

== History ==
The community was named after Salmo, a genus of fish which includes the Atlantic salmon.

The Bayfield Fish Hatchery, which is listed on the National Register of Historic Places, is located in Salmo.

== Climate ==
Bayfield Fish Hatchery is a weather station near Salmo.

Climate data for Bayfield Fish Hatchery, Wisconsin, 1991–2020 normals: 615ft (187m)
Month	Jan	Feb	Mar	Apr	May	Jun	Jul	Aug	Sep	Oct	Nov	Dec	Year
Record high °F (°C)	54 (12)	57 (14)	78 (26)	81 (27)	94 (34)	93 (34)	97 (36)	96 (36)	89 (32)	85 (29)	79 (26)	53 (12)	97 (36)
Mean maximum °F (°C)	42.1 (5.6)	45.6 (7.6)	60.8 (16.0)	71.5 (21.9)	83.8 (28.8)	86.7 (30.4)	91.3 (32.9)	88.9 (31.6)	83.8 (28.8)	74.8 (23.8)	60.2 (15.7)	44.3 (6.8)	91.8 (33.2)
Mean daily maximum °F (°C)	22.5 (−5.3)	26.1 (−3.3)	36.6 (2.6)	48.7 (9.3)	60.0 (15.6)	71.2 (21.8)	77.3 (25.2)	75.9 (24.4)	68.4 (20.2)	54.6 (12.6)	39.5 (4.2)	28.0 (−2.2)	50.7 (10.4)
Daily mean °F (°C)	13.1 (−10.5)	16.0 (−8.9)	26.7 (−2.9)	38.9 (3.8)	49.8 (9.9)	60.7 (15.9)	66.7 (19.3)	65.5 (18.6)	58.0 (14.4)	45.1 (7.3)	32.3 (0.2)	20.2 (−6.6)	41.1 (5.0)
Mean daily minimum °F (°C)	3.6 (−15.8)	5.9 (−14.5)	16.7 (−8.5)	29.0 (−1.7)	39.5 (4.2)	50.1 (10.1)	56.1 (13.4)	55.0 (12.8)	47.5 (8.6)	35.5 (1.9)	25.0 (−3.9)	12.3 (−10.9)	31.4 (−0.4)
Mean minimum °F (°C)	−17.8 (−27.7)	−16.1 (−26.7)	−6.6 (−21.4)	15.1 (−9.4)	27.1 (−2.7)	34.9 (1.6)	45.8 (7.7)	44.0 (6.7)	34.7 (1.5)	23.2 (−4.9)	9.5 (−12.5)	−8.5 (−22.5)	−20.5 (−29.2)
Record low °F (°C)	−27 (−33)	−27 (−33)	−21 (−29)	1 (−17)	23 (−5)	30 (−1)	40 (4)	39 (4)	29 (−2)	16 (−9)	−4 (−20)	−22 (−30)	−27 (−33)
Average precipitation inches (mm)	1.54 (39)	1.27 (32)	1.60 (41)	2.68 (68)	3.51 (89)	3.88 (99)	3.85 (98)	3.59 (91)	3.41 (87)	3.22 (82)	2.09 (53)	1.98 (50)	32.62 (829)
Average snowfall inches (cm)	19.7 (50)	18.8 (48)	8.5 (22)	11.1 (28)	1.2 (3.0)	0.0 (0.0)	0.0 (0.0)	0.0 (0.0)	0.0 (0.0)	0.6 (1.5)	10.8 (27)	26.2 (67)	96.9 (246.5)
Source 1: NOAA
Source 2: XMACIS (2009-2020 snowfall, records & monthly max/mins)
