= Reiten Boatyard =

- Formerly listed on the U.S. National Register of Historic Places
- Location: Broad St. Bayfield, Wisconsin
- Built: 1909
- Demolished: 1984
- NRHP reference No.: 82000630

Significant dates
- Added to NRHP: May 13, 1982
- Removed from NRHP: June 15, 1984

The Reiten Boatyard was located in Bayfield, Wisconsin.

== History ==
The Reiten Boatyard was a marina and a boatyard for boats and other aquatic equipment. It was added to the National Register of Historic Places in 1982. However, it was removed after it was demolished in 1984.
