= Frank Boutin Jr. House =

Historic house in Wisconsin, United States

- U.S. National Register of Historic Places
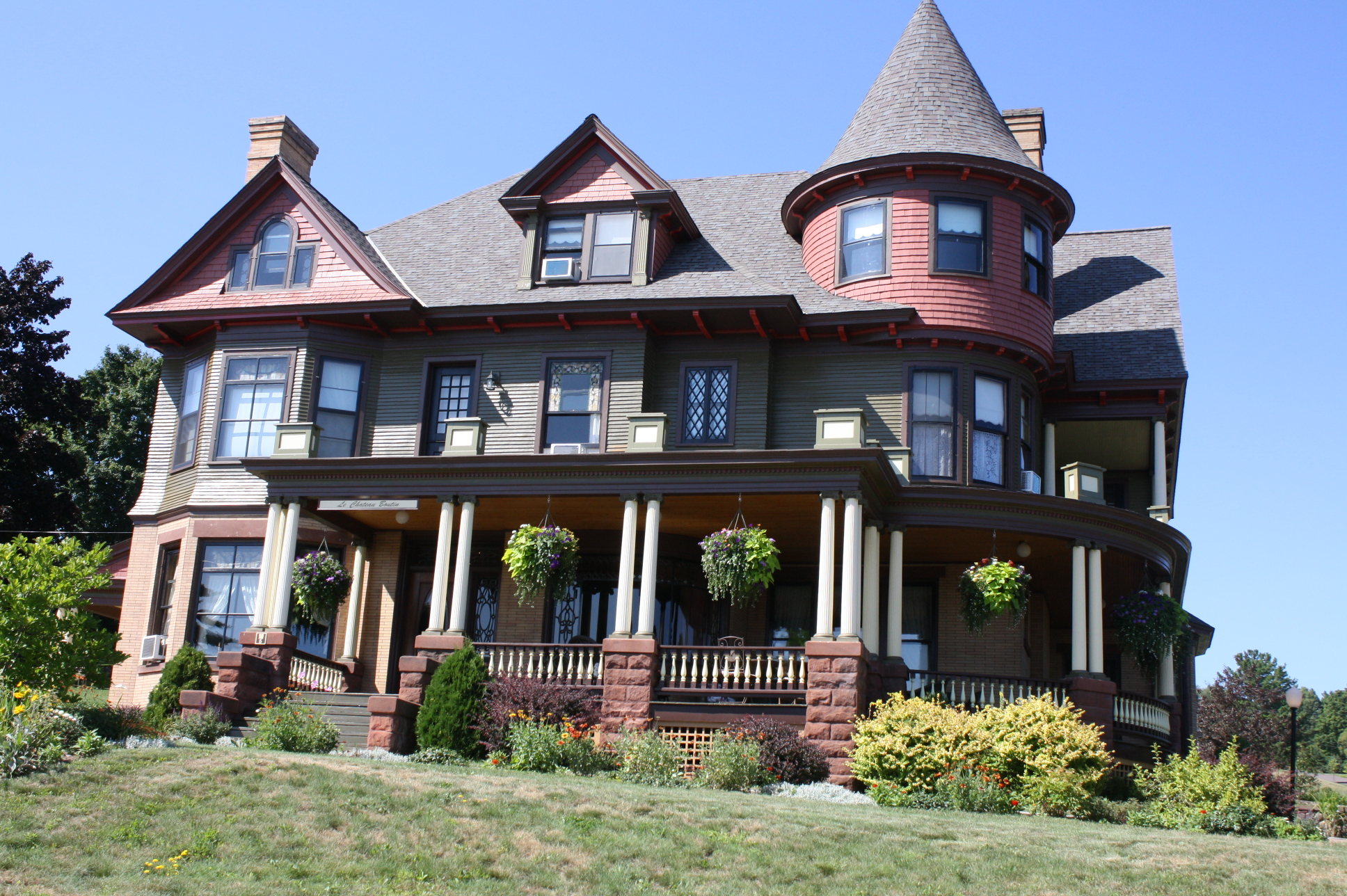
- Le Chateau Boutin

- Location within Wisconsin
- Location: 7 Rice Ave. Bayfield, Wisconsin
- Coordinates: 46°48′48.7548″N 90°48′52.5414″W
- Built: c. 1908
- Architect: Frank Boutin Jr.
- Architectural style: Queen Anne style architecture
- NRHP reference No.: 74000056
- Added to NRHP: December 27, 1974

The Frank Boutin Jr. House is a historic single dwelling in Bayfield, Wisconsin, United States. The property was added to the National Register of Historic Places on December 27, 1974.

== History ==
The house was built in 1908 by Frank Boutin Jr. in the Queen Anne style architecture which is exemplified by its sweeping porches, corner turret, dormer windows, and complex gable roof. Boutin Jr. lived in the house for only a few years before moving to Idaho, where he was successful in the lumber industry.

== Present ==
The house has been restored by its current owners and is now run as a bed and breakfast called Le Chateau Boutin.
