= Pureair Sanatorium =

- U.S. National Register of Historic Places
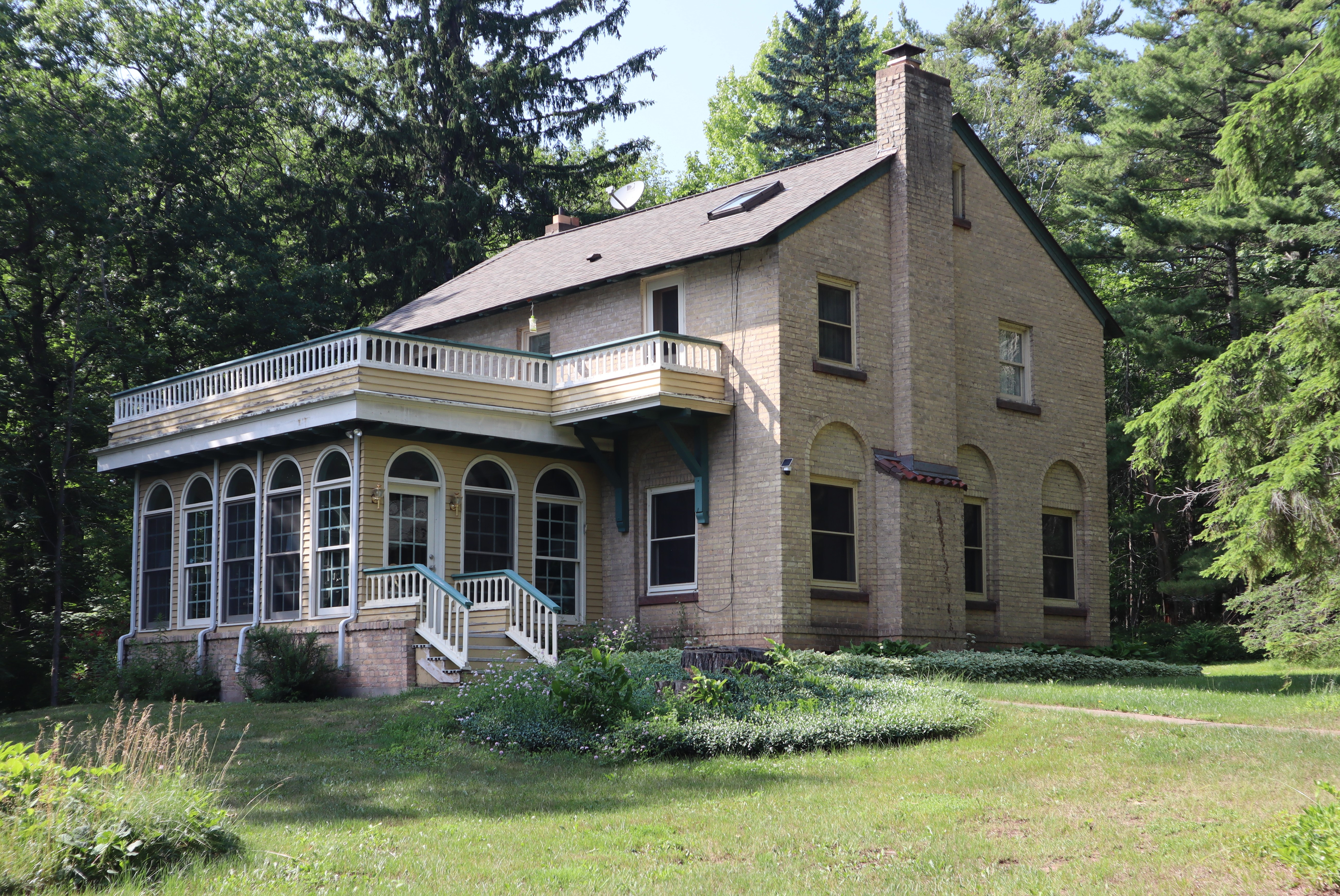
- Nearest city: Bayfield, Wisconsin
- Area: 4.7 acres (1.9 ha)
- Built: 1918-1923
- Architectural style: Vernacular
- NRHP reference No.: 81000034
- Added to NRHP: August 20, 1981

Pureair Sanatorium is located in Bayfield County, Wisconsin.

== History ==
Construction of the sanatorium began in 1918 as an effort to combat tuberculosis. The facility opened in 1920 despite the fact that the construction was not yet finished because the disease had become particularly widespread among the Bad River Band of the Lake Superior Tribe of Chippewa Indians and a nearby community of iron miners. In 1923, additions were added to accommodate World War I veterans who had contracted the disease while overseas.

The sanatorium ceased operations in 1975. It was added to the National Register of Historic Places in 1981. The site was also added to the state register in 1989.

Pureair, Wisconsin is named after it.
