= Bayfield Fish Hatchery =

- U.S. National Register of Historic Places
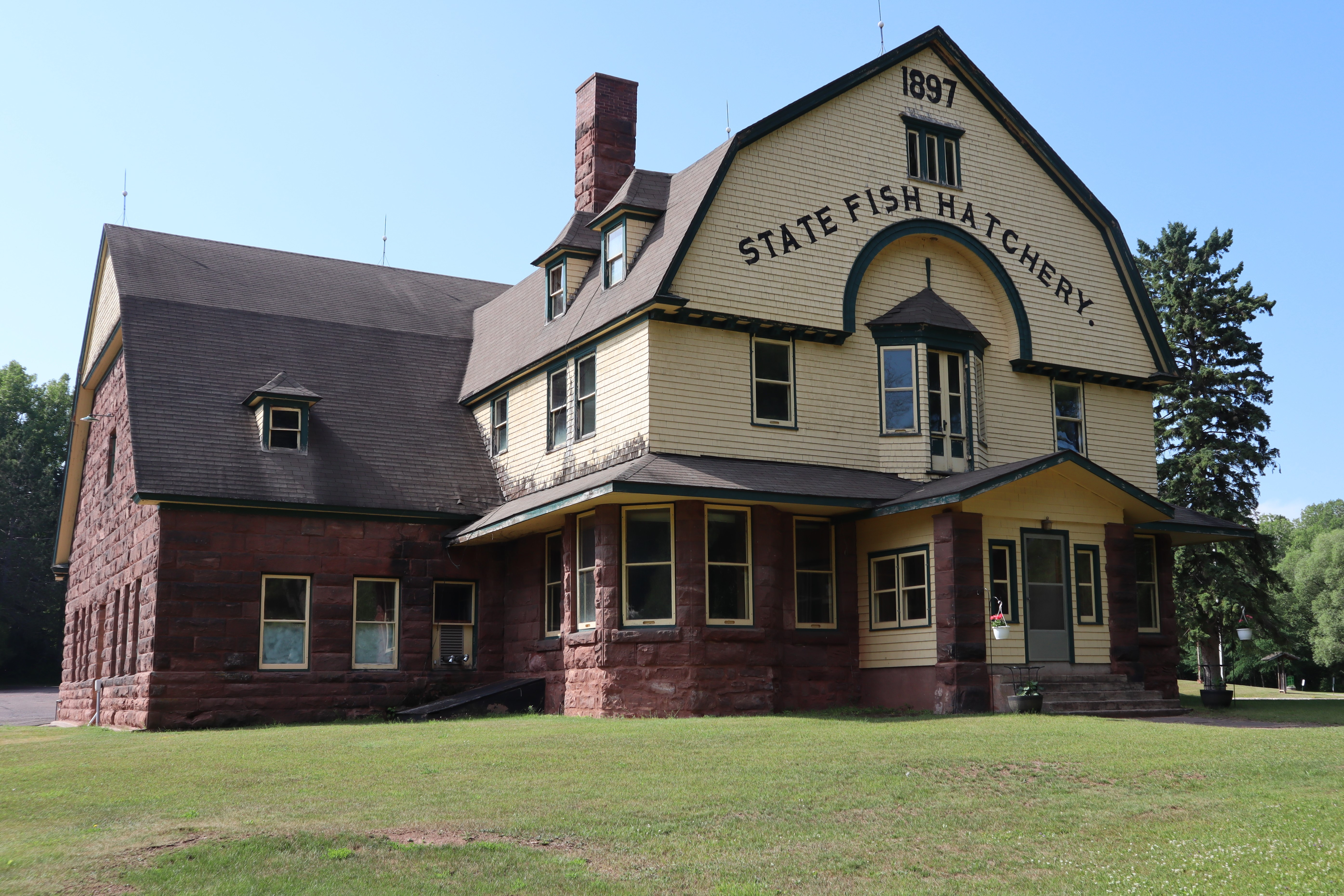
- The building in 2026

- Location within Wisconsin Location within the United States
- Nearest city: Salmo, Wisconsin
- Coordinates: 46°47′10″N 90°51′49″W
- Area: 0.1 acres (0.040 ha)
- Built: 1897
- Built by: Van Nest & Paulissen
- Architect: H.P. Hadley
- Architectural style: Queen Anne, Shingle Style
- NRHP reference No.: 81000033
- Added to NRHP: July 22, 1981

The Bayfield Fish Hatchery is a historic fish hatchery in Salmo, Wisconsin, located 2.3 miles (3.7 km) southwest of Bayfield. The hatchery was built in 1897 in the Queen Anne style and Shingle style using local brownstone and played a historically significant role in the fishing industry on Lake Superior. On July 22, 1981, the hatchery was listed on the National Register of Historic Places.

== History ==
Elisha and R.D. Pike owned a private fish hatchery in Bayfield County from the 1860s to 1895. The Wisconsin State Legislature mandated the construction of a fish hatchery in northern Wisconsin in 1895, so R.D. Pike donated 405 acres (1.64 km^{2}) from his hatchery to serve as the state hatchery. The state built the main hatchery building in 1897 using brownstone from nearby Pike's Quarry. The Chicago, St. Paul, Minneapolis and Omaha Railway built a siding to the hatchery, and a special railcar known as The Badger brought fish from the hatchery to Wisconsin waterbodies. In 1974, new buildings and wells were constructed to modernize the hatchery. The hatchery was renamed in honor of longtime Wisconsin Department of Natural Resources secretary Les Voigt in 2006, and the main building was named for R.D. Pike in 2011. The hatchery currently spawns five types of trout and salmon and also includes a visitor center and aquarium.
