= John and Justina Palo Homestead =

Homestead in Oulu, Wisconsin, USA

The John and Justina Palo Homestead is located in Oulu, Wisconsin, United States. It was added to the National Register of Historic Places in 2002.

== History ==
The homestead was built by John Palo, a Finnish immigrant, and his wife, Justina. It is made up of a house, a wellhouse, an outhouse and a combination building. The latter contains a sauna, a woodshed and a shop. After John's death in 1949 and Justina's death in 1977, the property was vacant, though it remained in the family. Restoration of the property began in 1997 by the couple's grandson, Duane Lahti.
