= Pureair, Wisconsin =

- Unincorporated community
- Location within Wisconsin Location within the United States
- Coordinates: 46°47′25″N 90°50′51″W
- Country: United States
- State: Wisconsin
- County: Bayfield
- Town: Bayfield
- Elevation: 650 ft (200 m)
- Time zone: UTC-6 (Central (CST))
  - Summer (DST): UTC-5 (CDT)
- Area codes: 715 and 534
- GNIS feature ID: 1577781

Pureair is an unincorporated community located in the town of Bayfield, Bayfield County, Wisconsin, United States.

== History ==
The area was named after the Pureair Sanatorium which treated tuberculosis patients from Bayfield County, Iron County and Ashland County, as well as some veterans of World War I, between the years 1920–1975. The sanatorium has since been demolished.
