= Bay Area Rural Transit =

Public transportation system in northern Wisconsin

Coordinates: 46°35′58″N 90°51′11″W

- Founded: 1981
- Headquarters: 2216 6th St. E., Ashland, WI
- Locale: Ashland County and Bayfield County, Wisconsin
- Service type: bus service, paratransit
- Routes: 14
- Fleet: 24
- Annual ridership: 123,214
- Website: http://www.bartbus.com/

Bay Area Rural Transit is a public transportation system in Ashland County, Bayfield County and Price County, Wisconsin.

== History ==
In 1980 a group of individuals determined to find a solution to the transportation needs of area residents, researched ways to establish a transit system that would help people get back and forth to work. With the help of some very determined area leaders and a representative from the Department of Transportation, Bay Area Rural Transit was born in 1981.

- In 1981 Bay Area Rural Transit first began with only two Routes, Route 1 (Red Cliff to Ashland) and Route 2 (Ashland to Odanah).
- In 2006 BART took over operations for the Washburn Blue Goose.
- In 2009 BART added Route 8 (City of Ashland) and Route 6 (Mellen) services.
- In the Summer of 2013, BART moved into its new building at 2216 East 6th Street.
- In 2016 BART began its first service in Price County with Route 11 (Park Falls).
- In 2018 BART expanded service to Price County with Route 12 (Phillips).
- In 2019 BART started Route 7. This route operates three times a day on Tuesdays between Ashland and Prentice servicing all of the communities in between on the Highway 13 corridor.
- In 2020 BART expanded service in Price County with Routes 16 and 17. These routes operate Monday through Saturday and travel between Phillips/Park Falls and Minocqua.
- In 2020 BART began its first service in Iron County with Routes 18 and 19. Route 18 operates on Tuesdays and travels between Hurley and Bad River. Route 19 operates on Wednesdays and travels between Hurley and Woodruff.

== Services ==
The transit system currently operates twelve routes, which run as follows:

- Route 1: Bad River-Red Cliff, Monday-Friday
- Route 2: Red Cliff-Bad River, Monday-Friday
- Route 3: Ashland-Red Cliff-Ashland, Saturday
- Route 4: "Blue Goose" Demand Response, Monday-Friday
- Route 6: Mellen-Ashland-Mellen, Monday, Thursday
- Route 8: Ashland City, Demand Response, Monday-Friday
- Route 9: Glidden-Park Falls-Glidden, Demand Response, Monday-Friday
- Route 10: Glidden-Mellen-Glidden, Demand Response, Monday-Friday
- Route 11: Park Falls-Phillips, Demand Response, Monday-Saturday
- Route 12: Phillips-Park Falls, Demand Response, Monday-Saturday
- Route 16: Phillips-Minocqua-Phillips, Demand Response, Monday-Friday
- Route 17: Phillips-Minocqua-Phillips, Demand Response, Saturday
- Route 18: Hurley, Canceled
- Route 19: Hurley, Canceled

== Communities Served ==
- Ashland
- Bad River
- Bayfield
- Butternut
- Glidden
- Highbridge
- Marengo
- Mellen
- Minocqua
- Park Falls
- Phillips
- Red Cliff
- Washburn

== Ridership ==
	Ridership	Change over previous year
2014	152,074	n/a
2015	139,601	▼8.2%
2016	133,625	▼4.28%
2017	140,341	▲5.03%
2018	124,367	▼11.38%
2019	136,981	▲10.14%
2020	124,022	▼9.46%
2021	75,804	▼38.88%
2022	88,599	▲16.88%
2023	123,214	▲39.07%

== See also ==
- Duluth Transit Authority
- List of bus transit systems in the United States
