= Herbster Community Center =

- U.S. National Register of Historic Places
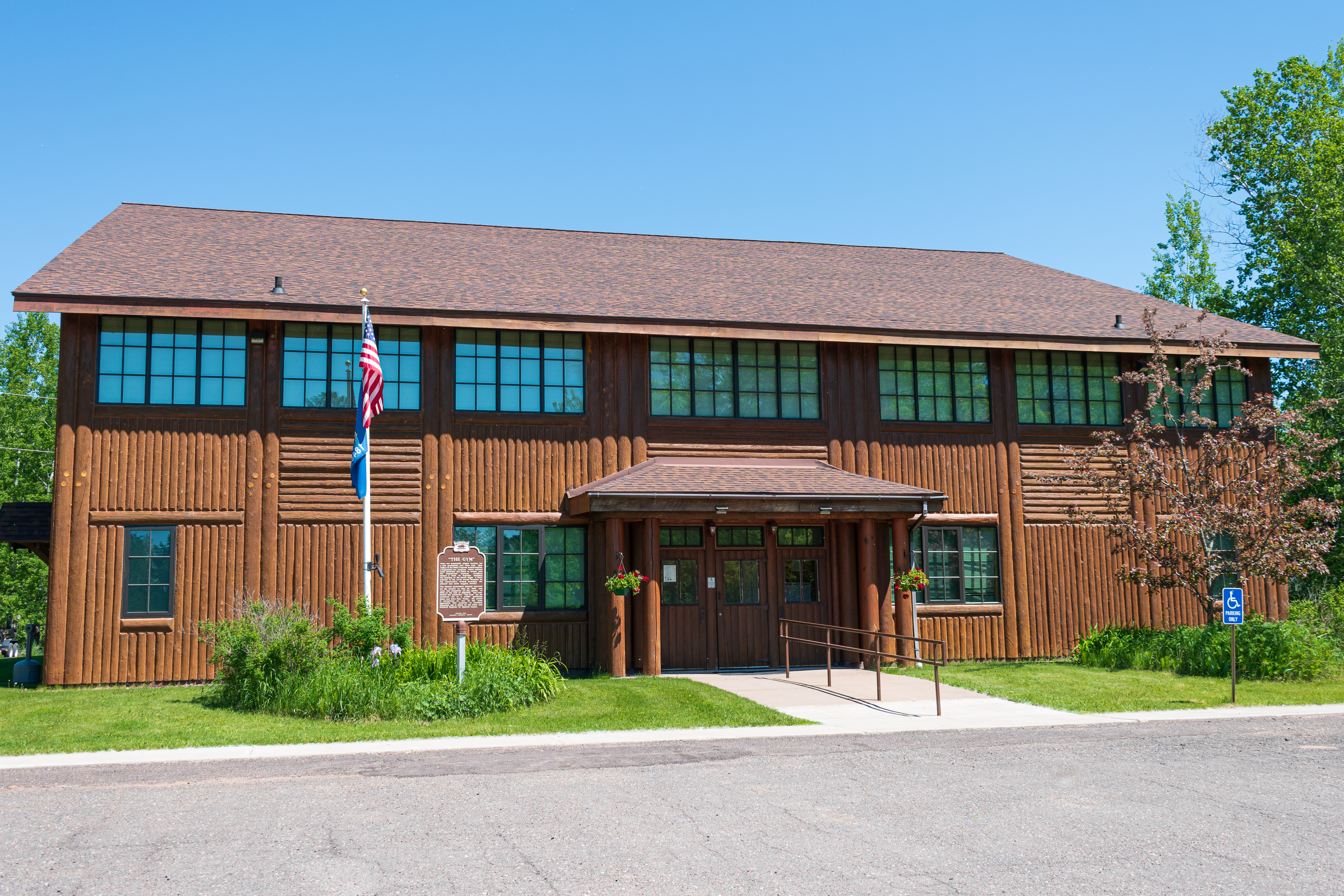
- Location: Lenawee Rd., S of jct. of Lenawee Rd. and WI 13, Herbster, Wisconsin
- Coordinates: 46°49′51″N 91°15′43″W
- Built: 1939-40
- Architect: Buck, Roland C.
- Architectural style: Rustic
- NRHP reference No.: 97000888
- Added to NRHP: August 15, 1997

Herbster Community Center is located in the community of Herbster, Wisconsin in the town of Clover, Wisconsin. It was added to the National Register of Historic Places in 1997.

== History ==
The community center was funded by the Works Progress Administration in 1939. Construction was completed the following year. It became a gym and the Clover Town Hall.
