= Forest Lodge (Namakagon, Wisconsin) =

- U.S. National Register of Historic Places
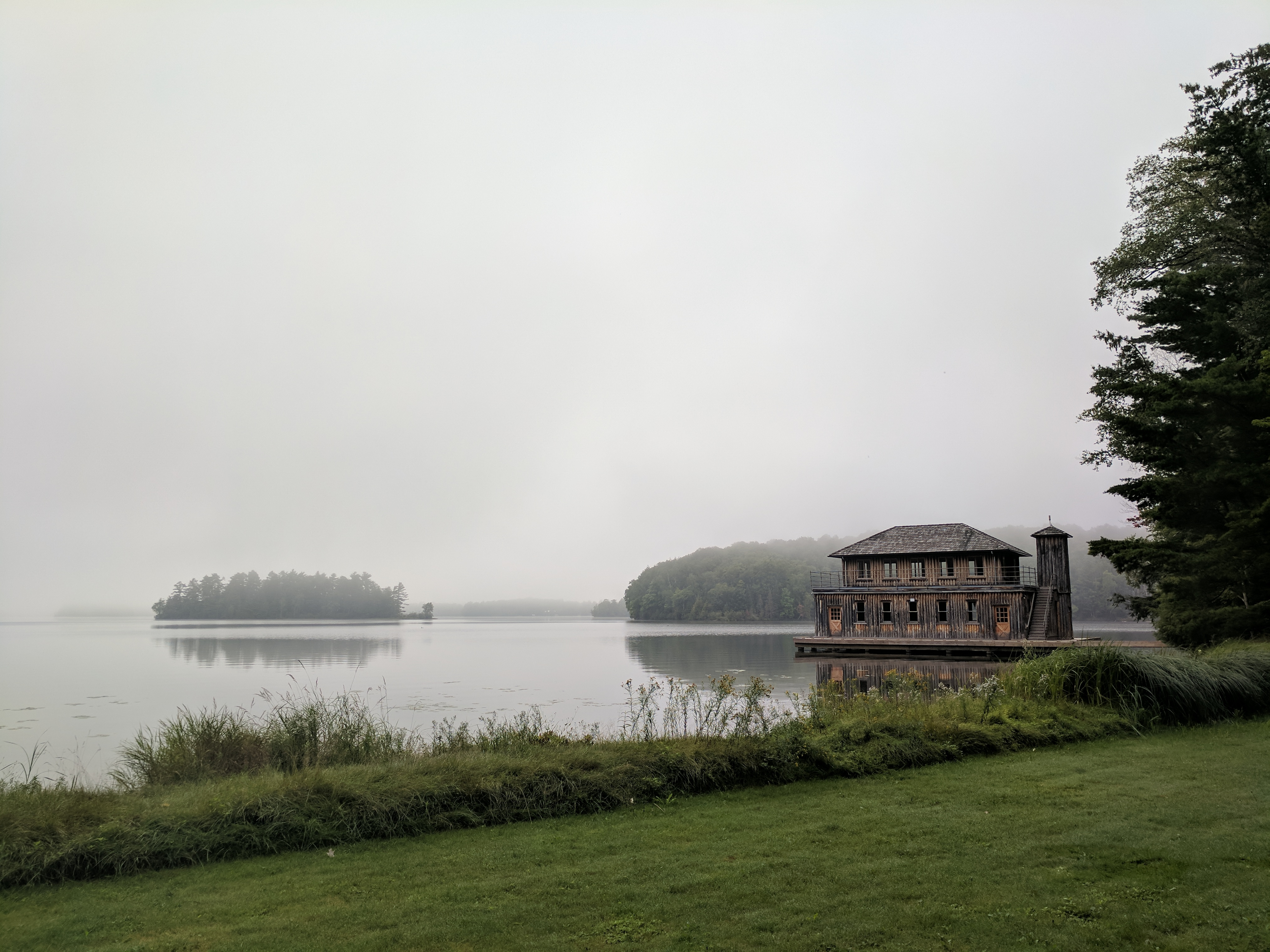
- Boathouse viewed from the bowling green
- Location: Namakagon, Wisconsin
- Built: 1893-1950
- NRHP reference No.: 02000031

Forest Lodge is a hunting and vacation retreat of the Livingston/Griggs family on the shore of Lake Namekagon within the town of Namakagon, Wisconsin. The complex consists of 16 rustic structures built from 1893 to about 1950. Since 1999 it has been managed by the Chequamegon-Nicolet National Forest. It was added to the National Register of Historic Places in 2002.

== History ==
Crawford Livingston Jr. was born in 1848 to a prominent New York family. In 1870 he came to St. Paul and became involved in railroad, gas, electric and lumber ventures. In 1875 he married Mary Steele Potts and they had daughter Mary Steele Livingston the following year.

In 1884 the Northern Wisconsin Lumber Company bought the land that would become Forest Lodge, and by 1888 the company had built a logging camp there, on the south side of a bay of Lake Namekagon. Soon the timber was cut and in 1889 Crawford Livingston and some hunters and fishermen from Chicago leased the land around the camp as a hunting retreat. It is said that a blacksmith shop, bunkhouse, cookhouse and other log buildings were still present from the logging camp. The first new construction was probably a cabin in 1893.

With the decline of logging, people realized the potential of the area around Lake Namekagon for recreation. In 1890 and 1891 two homes were constructed on Champaign Island, and in 1890 a home on Anderson Island. The area was connected by rail to Minneapolis and St. Paul and became a vacation destination. By 1911 six resorts were operating on the lake.

Meanwhile, the focus of Livingston's camp shifted from a men's hunting camp to a family retreat. In 1902 Livingston assumed full ownership of 100 acres including the camp. Substantial remodelings in the 1910s, 1920s and 1930s expanded the retreat's size. Many of the additions came after 1927 when Crawford's daughter Mary and her husband Theodore Griggs owned Forest Lodge. Some came later after their daughter, Mary Griggs Burke, inherited it in 1943.

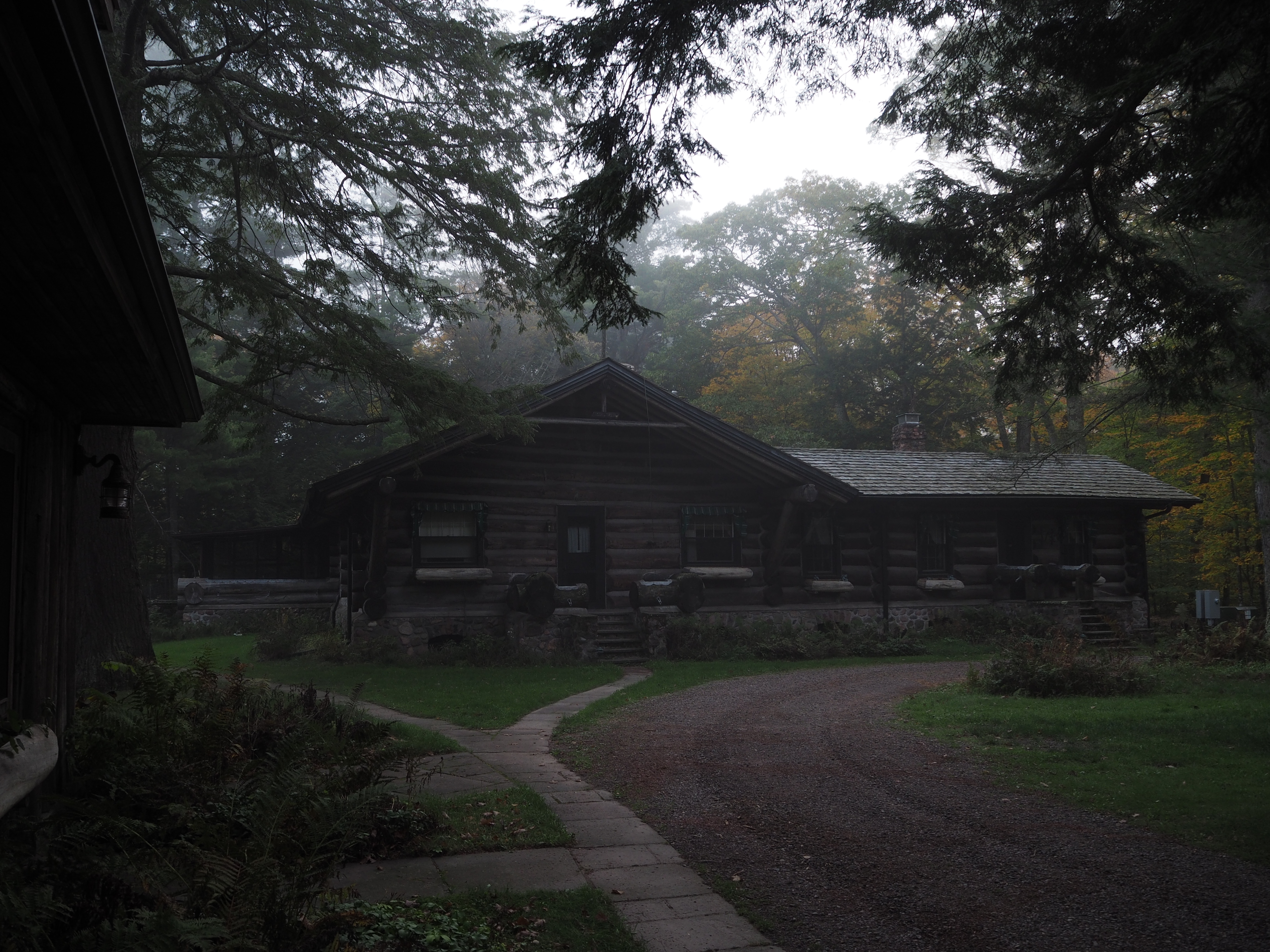
Original Main Lodge at Forest Lodge

The 1893 cabin was expanded or rebuilt into the main lodge in 1914-1915, then remodeled in 1928-29. The result is a rustic-styled log building on a stone foundation with full logs joined by saddle notches. Its roof is covered with wood shakes, pierced by four stone chimneys. An open porch spans the front. In the 1930s Edwin Lundie designed some improvements to the lodge. Inside are a dining room, living room, kitchen, maid's dining room, three bedrooms, library, sitting room, and three bathrooms. Decoration is simple - largely logs, wood paneling, and wood floors.

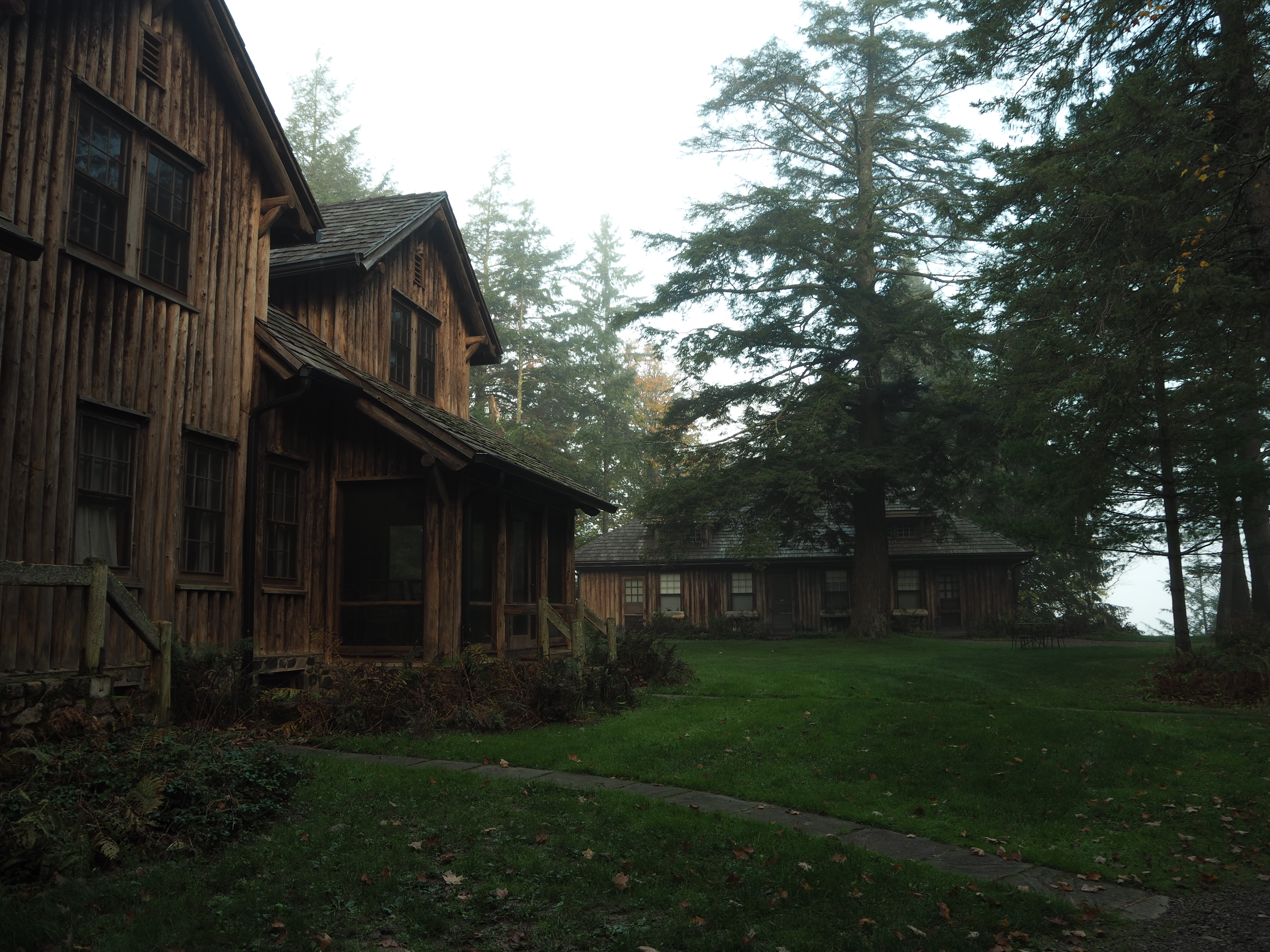
View of the Forest Lodge Guest House and Maids Cabin

The maid's cabin was built 1911-1912 and rebuilt in 1929. It is built into the hillside, one story, with walls of vertical logs and a hipped roof. Inside are five bedrooms, two bathrooms, a living room, kitchen and laundry room.

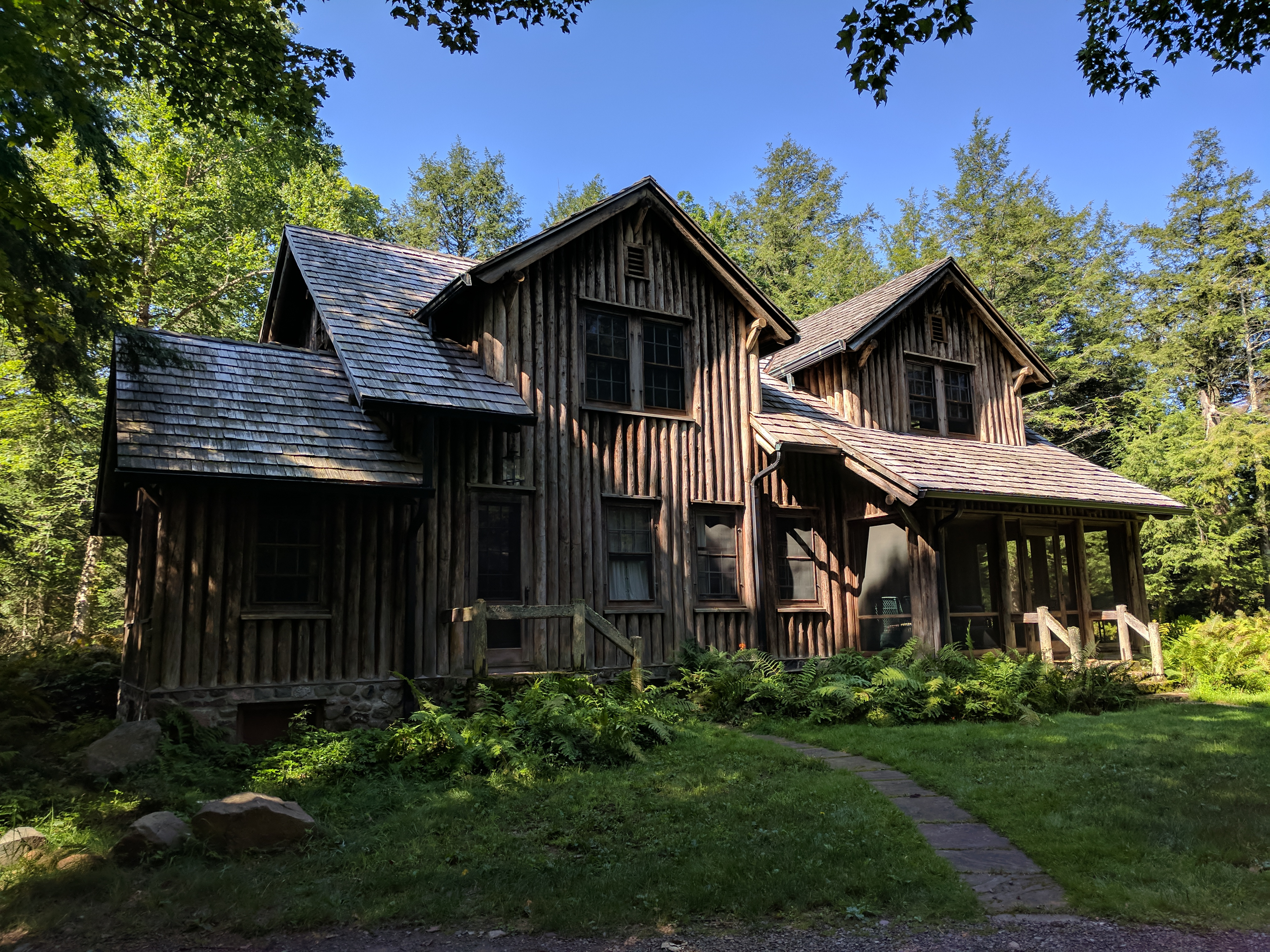
Forest Lodge Guest House

The 2-story guest house was designed by Magnus Jemne and built 1928-29. Inside is a 24x34 foot "old English great room" with a vaulted ceiling and a kitchen with a dumbwaiter to deliver food to the great room.

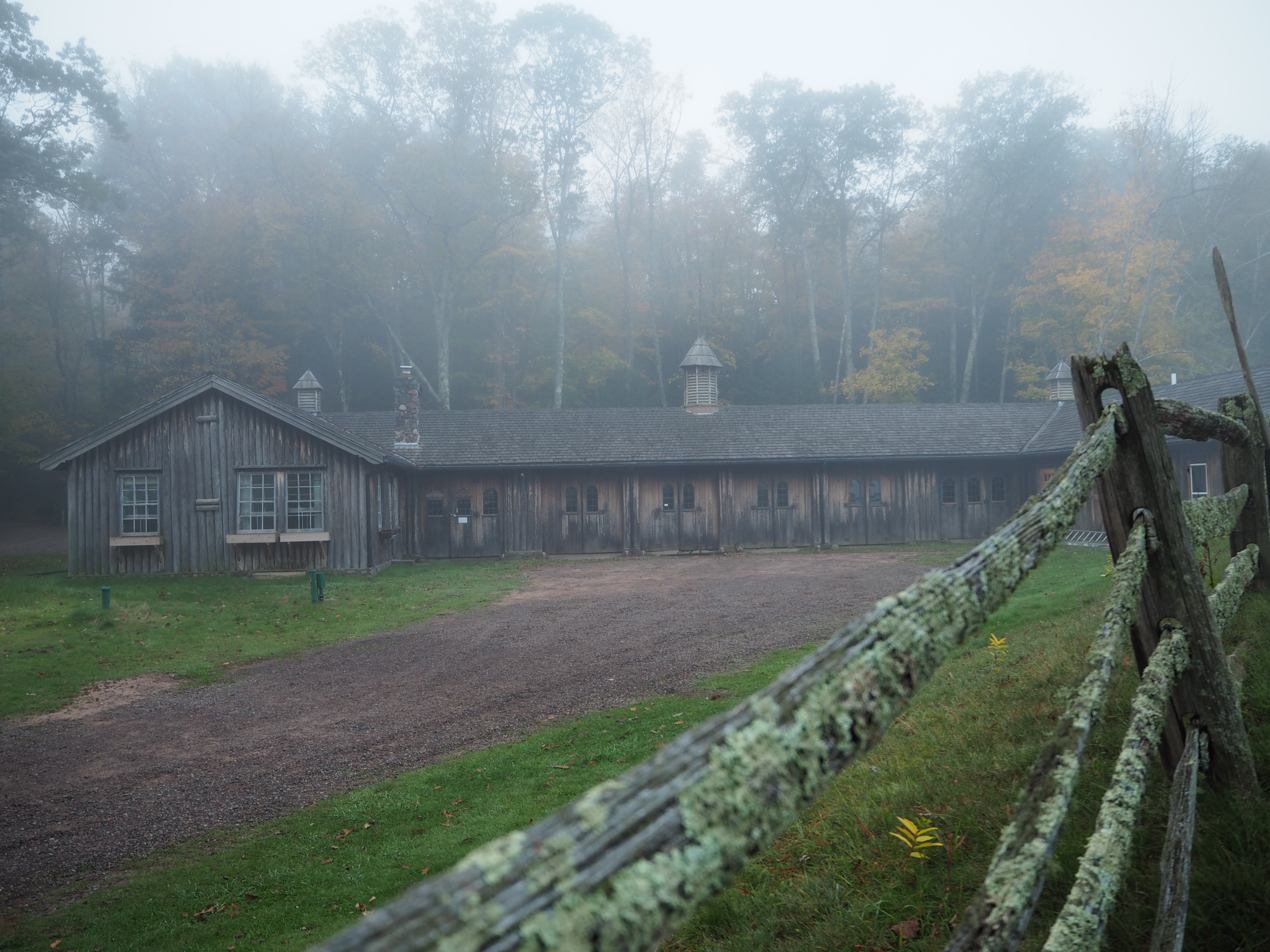
View of the garage and cow barn at Forest Lodge

The "Cow Palace" was built in 1929 and expanded in 1940. It served as garage, stable, and living quarters for chauffeurs, gardeners, and the dairyman's family. Like other buildings, the walls are vertical logs on a stone foundation. The footprint is an 'H'. Milk and cream were processed right in the building and the Forest Lodge Dairy supplied the lodge until 1961.

The complex also includes a pumphouse/storage cabin built in 1912, a 1920 garage, a 1922 playhouse which was a gift for Mary Griggs Burke from her parents, a 1923 stonehouse/storage building, a gatehouse built 1928-29, a large wet boathouse built the same year, an icehouse built in 1940 and restored in 1999. It also includes a 1929 tennis court, a greenhouse and gardens built in the 1930s, a storm shelter/root cellar built in the 1930s, a steamer/fire engine shed, and various paths and walls built throughout the life of the complex.

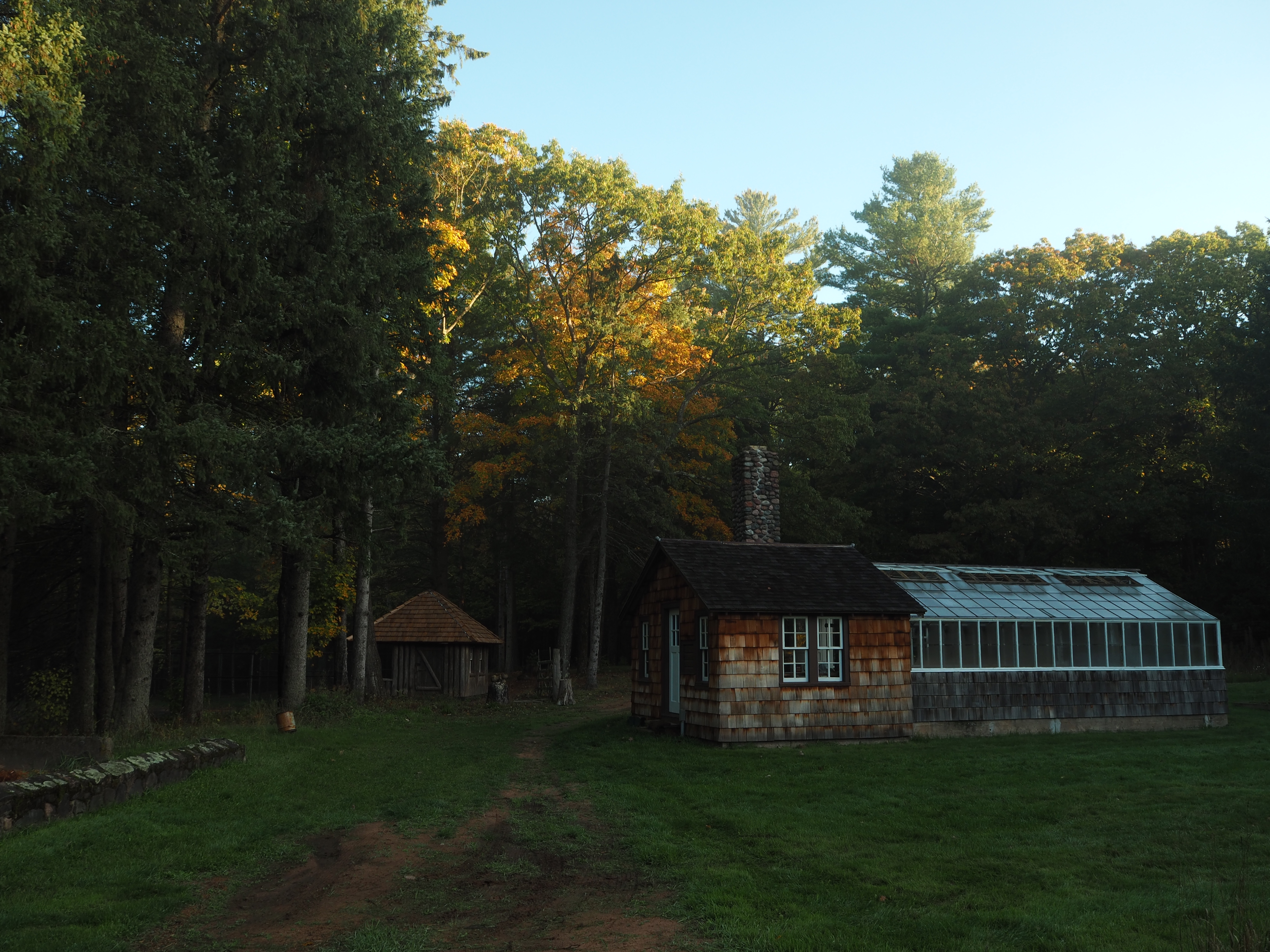
Forest Lodge Greenhouse and Tennis Hut

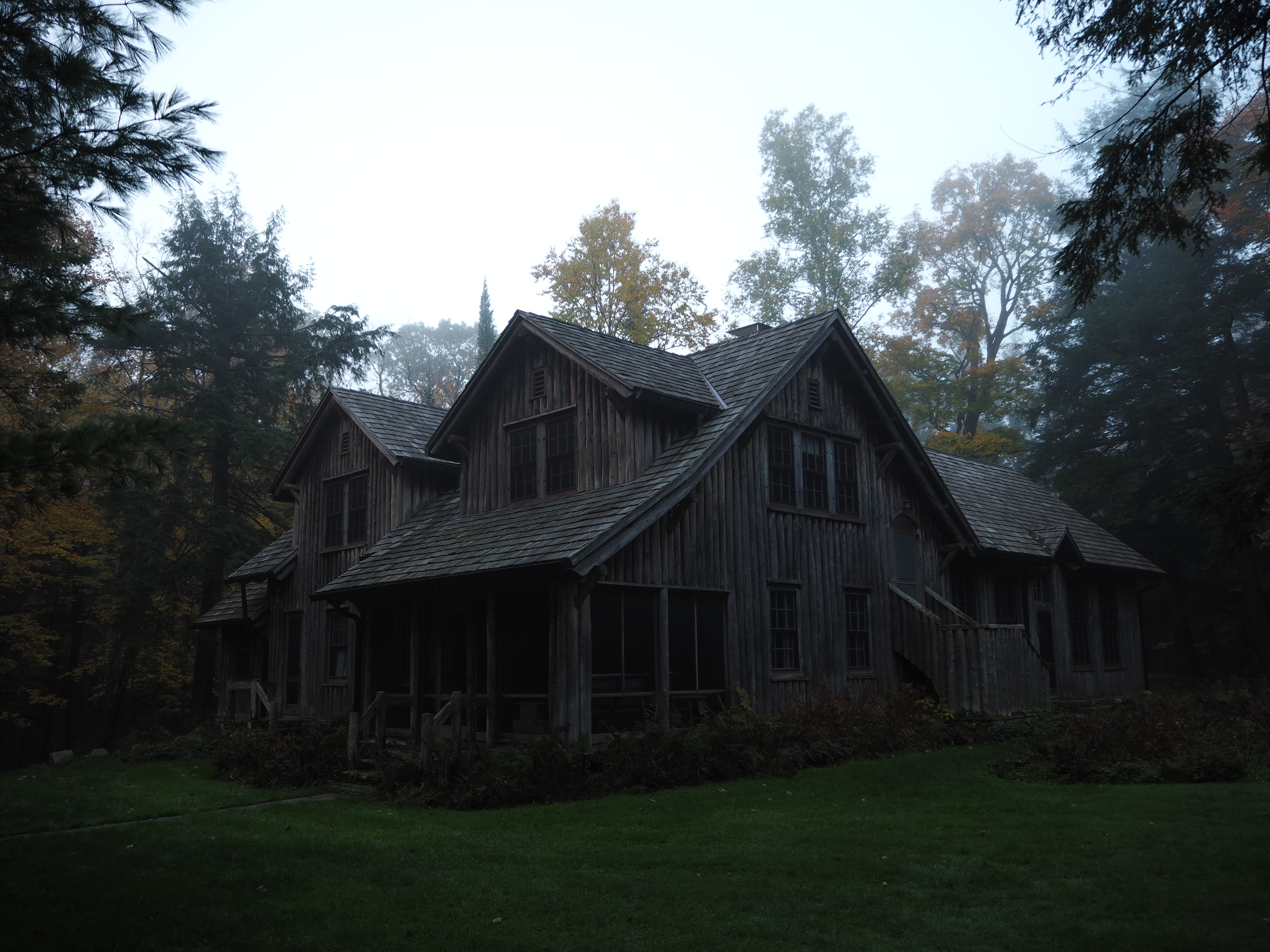
View of the Eastern and Northern sides of the Guest House at Forest Lodge

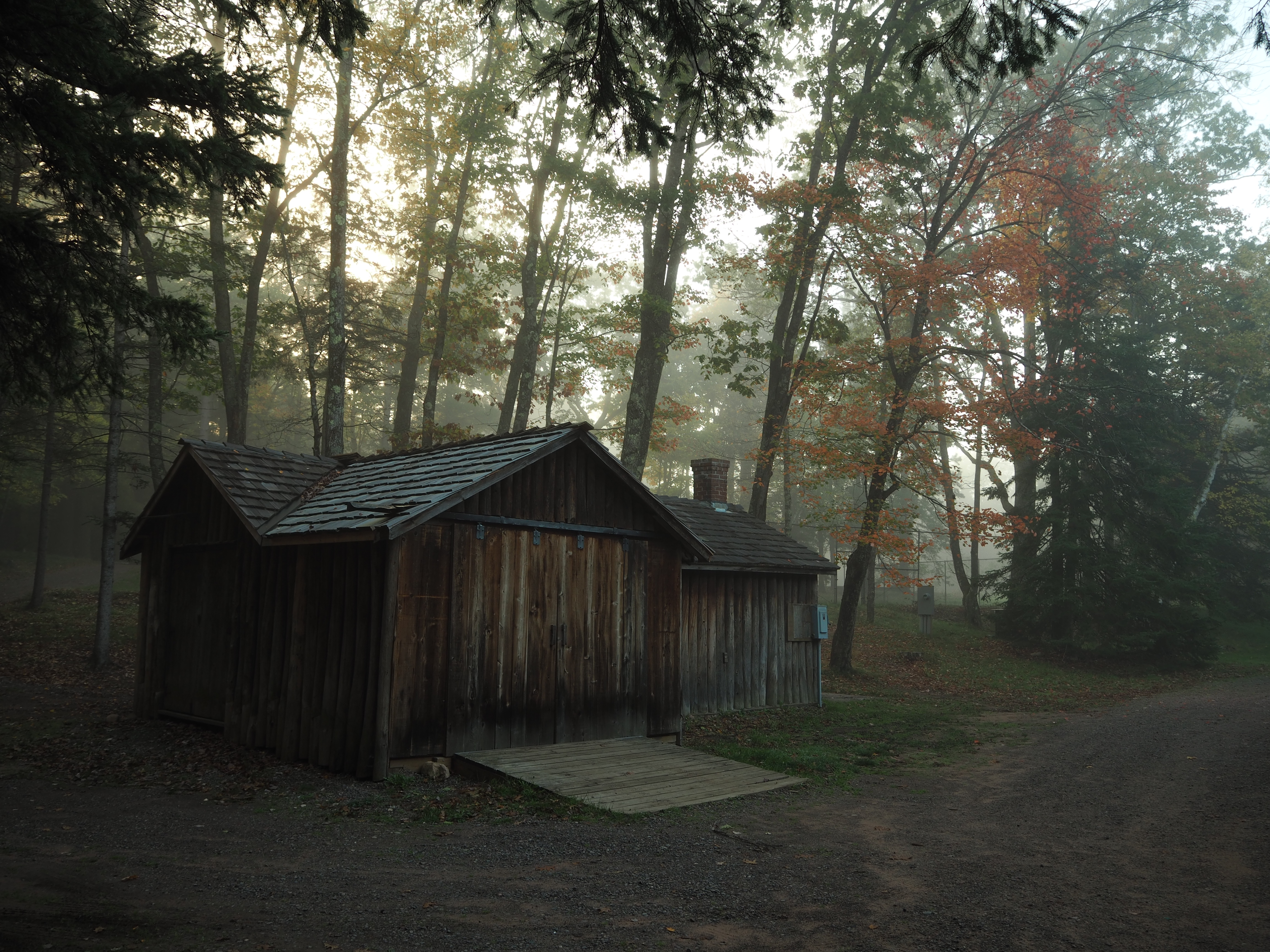
Forest Lodge Maintenance Garage

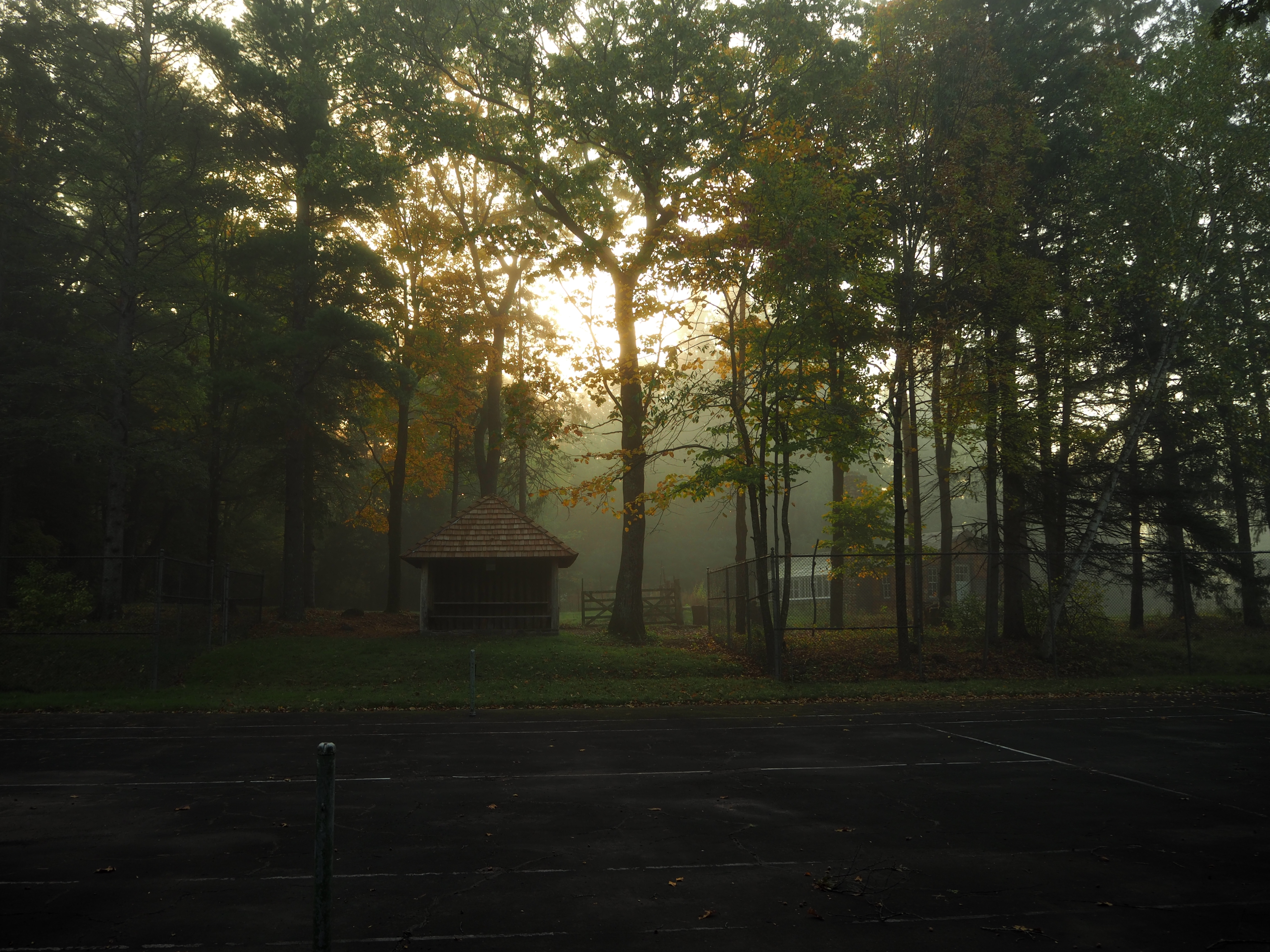
Forest Lodge Tennis Court and Hut

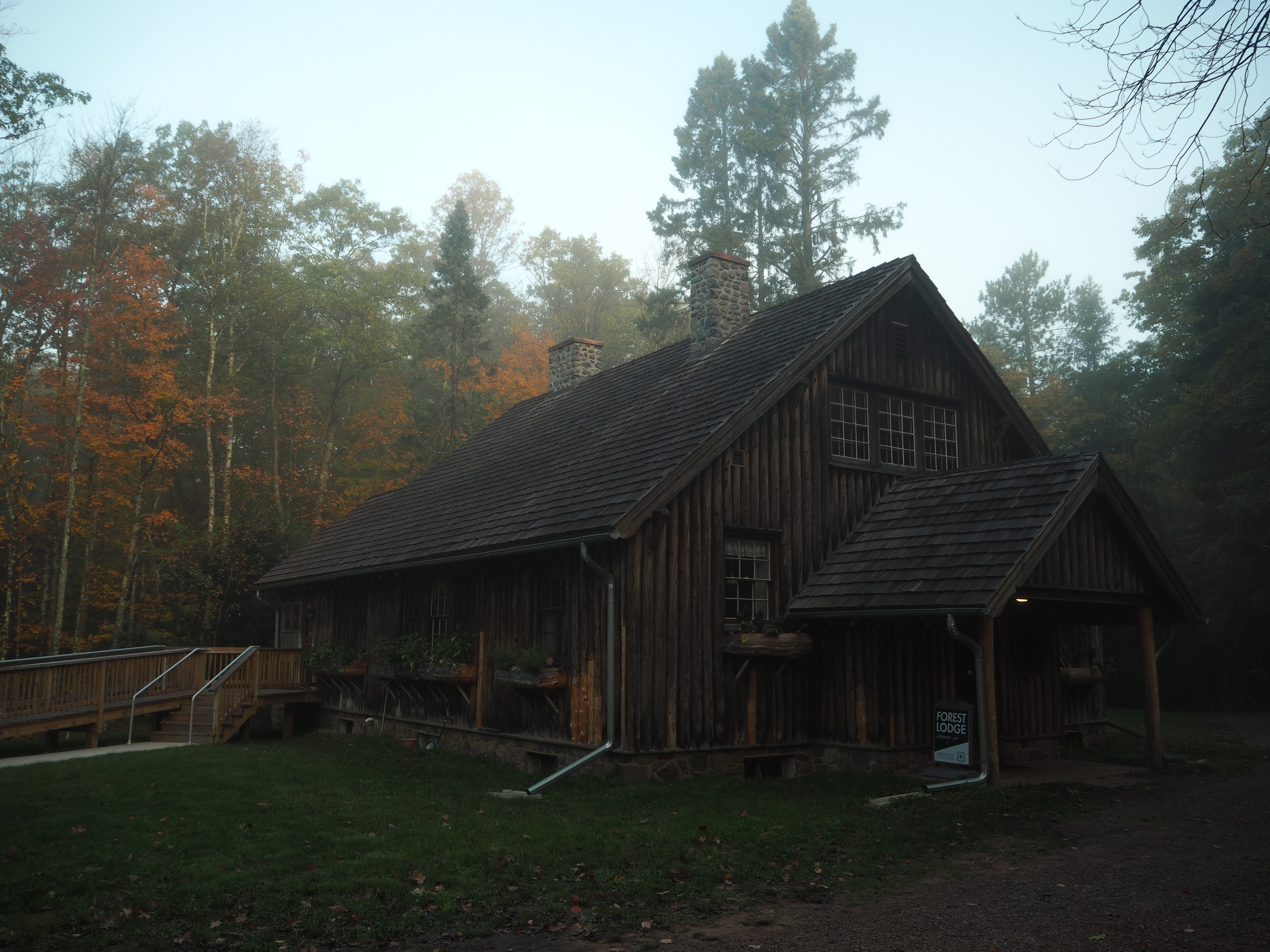
Forest Lodge Keepers House

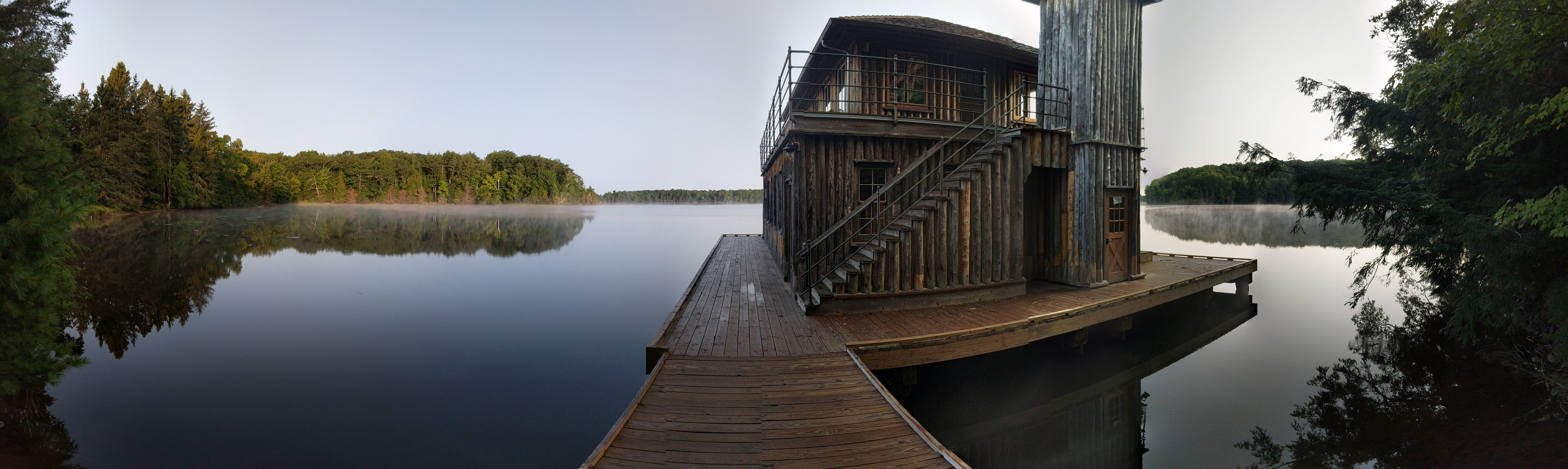
A panorama of the Boathouse on Lake Namekagon

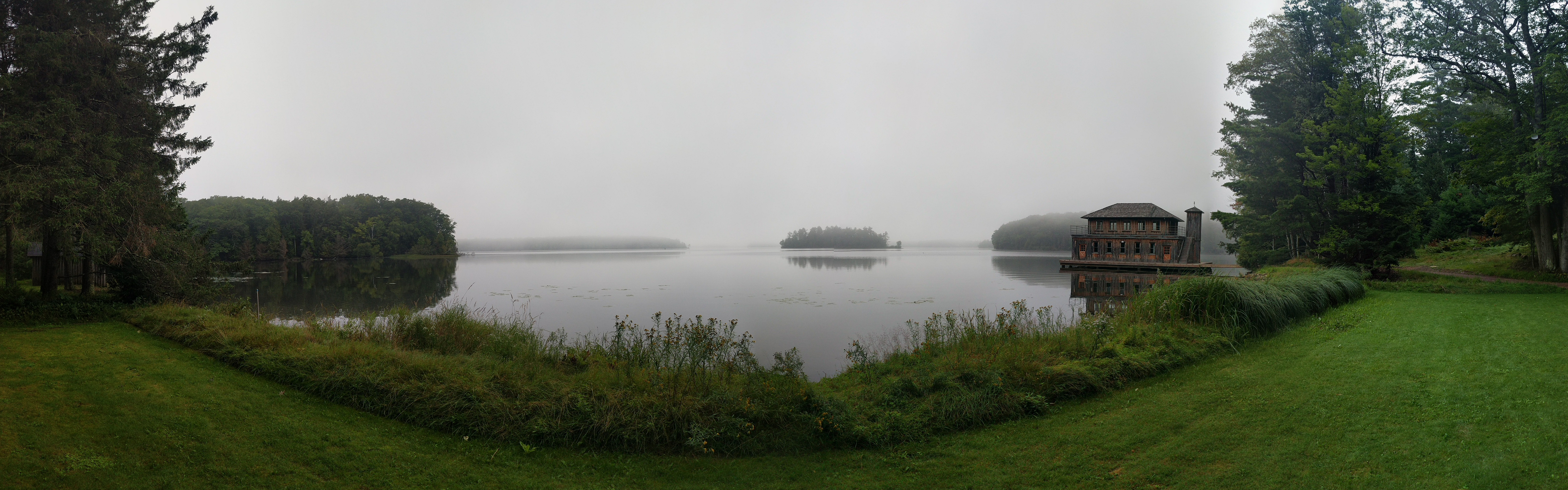
Panorama of Boathouse on Lake Namekagon at Forest Lodge from the Bowling Green

In 1999 an archaeological survey discovered Native American artifacts on the grounds.

In that same year, Mary Griggs Burke donated her 872-acre estate to the Chequamegon-Nicolet National Forest, requiring that it be used to "provide environmental research and educational programs." Since then, they have partnered with Northland College to deliver those goals. Tours of the estate can be arranged through Northland.
