= Oulu, Wisconsin =

- Town
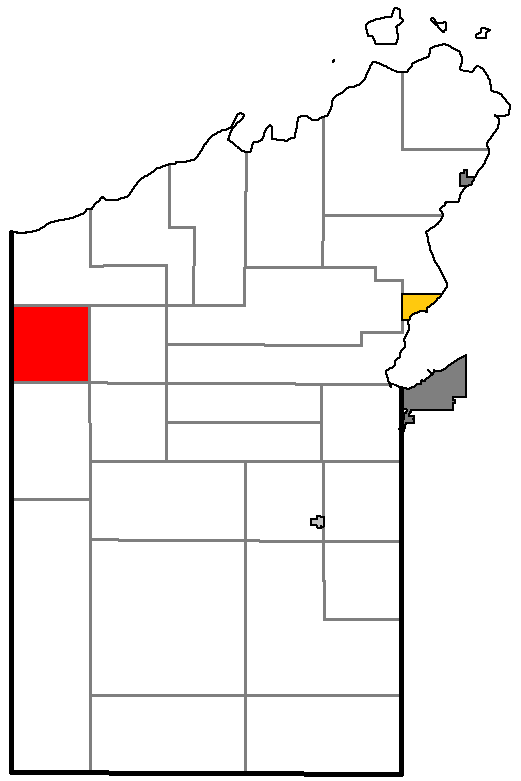
- Location of Oulu, within Bayfield County
- Coordinates: 46°37′34″N 091°30′02″W
- Country: United States
- State: Wisconsin
- County: Bayfield

Area
  - Total: 35.4 sq mi (91.8 km^{2})
  - Land: 35.4 sq mi (91.8 km^{2})
  - Water: 0 sq mi (0.0 km^{2})
- Elevation: 1,010 ft (308 m)

Population (2020)
  - Total: 560
  - Density: 16/sq mi (6.1/km^{2})
- Time zone: UTC-6 (Central (CST))
  - Summer (DST): UTC-5 (CDT)
- Area codes: 715 & 534
- FIPS code: 55-60775
- GNIS feature ID: 1583883
- Website: ouluwisconsin.com

Oulu (/ˈuːluː/ OO-loo) is a town in Bayfield County, Wisconsin, United States. The population was 560 at the 2020 census, up from 527 at the 2010 census. The town is named after Oulu, the fifth most populous city of Finland located in the North Ostrobothnia region.

== History ==
Finnish immigrants were settling in the area around Oulu since 1889. Although other immigrants came, including German and Norwegian settlers, around 75% of the population were still Finnish immigrants.

== Geography ==
According to the United States Census Bureau, the town has a total area of 35.4 square miles (91.8 km^{2}), all land.

== Demographics ==
=== 2020 census ===
As of the 2020 census, there were 560 people, 313 housing units, and 221 families in the town. The racial makeup was 94.8% White, 0.3% African American, 0.3% Native American, 0.0% Asian, 0.1% from some other race, and 4.2% from two or more races. Those of Hispanic or Latino origin made up 1.6% of the population.

The ancestry was 21.6% German, 10.7% Swedish, 10.5% Norwegian, 9.0% English, 8.6% Irish, and 3.2% Polish.

The median age was 53.4 years old. 21.6% of the population were 65 or older, 17.8% were between 65 and 74, 3.4% were between 75 and 84, and 0.4% were 85 or older. 13.7% of the population were under 18, with 2.4% under 5, 7.7% between the ages of 5 and 14, and 3.6% between 15 and 17.

The median household income was $77,625, families had $77,969, married couples had $78,281, and non-families had $77,000. 6.9% of people were in poverty.

=== 2000 census ===
As of the census of 2000, there were 540 people, 192 households, and 134 families residing in the town. According to the 2000 census, 44.7% of the population claimed Finnish as their primary ancestry.

The population density was 15.2 people per square mile (5.9/km^{2}). There were 267 housing units at an average density of 7.5 per square mile (2.9/km^{2}). The racial makeup of the town was 98.52% White, 0.56% Native American, 0.19% Asian, and 0.74% from two or more races. Hispanic or Latino of any race were 0.19% of the population. 44.7% were of Finnish, 16.8% German and 7.5% Irish ancestry.

There were 192 households, out of which 36.5% had children under the age of 18 living with them, 59.4% were married couples living together, 6.8% had a female householder with no husband present, and 29.7% were non-families. 25.5% of all households were made up of individuals, and 9.4% had someone living alone who was 65 years of age or older. The average household size was 2.81 and the average family size was 3.46.

In the town, the population was spread out, with 32.2% under the age of 18, 6.9% from 18 to 24, 27.2% from 25 to 44, 22.8% from 45 to 64, and 10.9% who were 65 years of age or older. The median age was 34 years. For every 100 females, there were 97.8 males. For every 100 females age 18 and over, there were 104.5 males.

The median income for a household in the town was $35,625, and the median income for a family was $45,750. Males had a median income of $32,321 versus $25,938 for females. The per capita income for the town was $15,017. About 7.5% of families and 11.4% of the population were below the poverty line, including 12.0% of those under age 18 and 15.9% of those age 65 or over.

== Culture ==
The Ostrobothnian-based Pudas House in town is the main building of the Oulu Cultural & Heritage Center.

Oulu, Wisconsin is also the name of a single released on January 7, 2022, by Finnish Musician J. Karjalainen.
