= Bayfield, Wisconsin =

- City
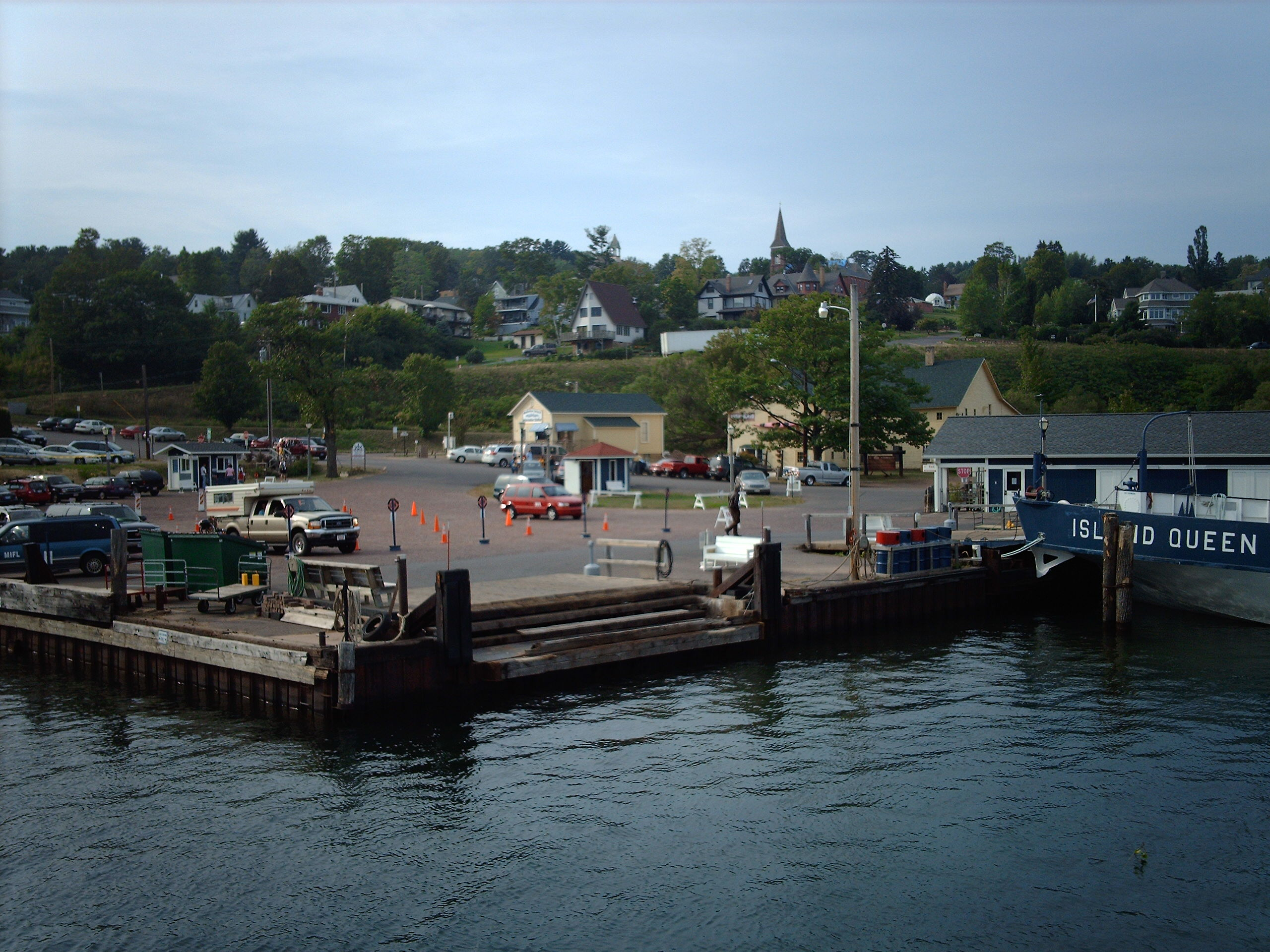
- Bayfield from the harbor

- Location of Bayfield in Bayfield County, Wisconsin.

- Location within Wisconsin Location within the United States
- Coordinates: 46°48.7′N 90°49.2′W
- Country: United States
- State: Wisconsin
- County: Bayfield

Area
  - Total: 0.86 sq mi (2.23 km^{2})
  - Land: 0.86 sq mi (2.23 km^{2})
  - Water: 0 sq mi (0.00 km^{2})
- Elevation: 830 ft (253 m)

Population (2020)
  - Total: 584
  - Density: 678.3/sq mi (261.9/km^{2})
- Time zone: UTC-6 (Central (CST))
  - Summer (DST): UTC-5 (CDT)
- ZIP codes: 54814
- Area codes: 715 and 534
- FIPS code: 55-05350
- GNIS feature ID: 1582764
- Public Transit: Bay Area Rural Transit
- Website: cityofbayfield.com

Bayfield is a city in Bayfield County, Wisconsin, United States. The population was 584 at the 2020 census, making it the city with the smallest population in Wisconsin.

Wisconsin Highway 13 serves as a main route in the community. Formerly the county seat and home to industries in lumbering and commercial fishing, today it is a tourist and resort destination referred to as the "Gateway to the Apostle Islands".

== History ==
Bayfield was named in 1856 for Henry Bayfield, a British Royal Topographic Engineer who explored the region in 1822–23. A post office has been in operation at Bayfield since 1856.

The first Catholic church was built in Bayfield in 1860, with the Franciscans following in 1878. Mass was held in the English and Ojibwe languages. In 1879, the Sisters of St. Francis of Mary Immaculate established an Indian residential school in Bayfield at the request of the Franciscan pastor. Bayfield Mission Boarding and Day School, also known as Holy Family Mission School, included students from the Fond du Lac Band Chippewa and the Saulteaux Ojibwe. In an 1889 report the school's superintendent said that his goals for the school were "civilizing the children and entirely abolishing the use of the Chippewa language." The school operated until 1999.

== Geography ==
Bayfield is located at 46°48.7′N 90°49.2′W (46.8115, -90.8203).

According to the United States Census Bureau, the city has a total area of 0.87 square miles (2.25 km^{2}), of which 0.86 square miles (2.23 km^{2}) is land and 0.01 square miles (0.03 km^{2}) is water.

Bayfield is the main gateway to the Apostle Islands National Lakeshore, a group of 21 islands in Lake Superior. Madeline Island is the largest of the Apostle Islands and the only one not in the National Lakeshore. A ferry to Madeline Island links Bayfield with La Pointe, Wisconsin, a community on the island. Bayfield's position on the lake was instrumental for transportation and commerce when the city was first established; common destinations were the nearby cities of La Pointe and Ashland.

=== Climate ===
Climate data for Bayfield 6 N, Wisconsin (1991–2020 normals, extremes 1893–2005)
Month	Jan	Feb	Mar	Apr	May	Jun	Jul	Aug	Sep	Oct	Nov	Dec	Year
Record high °F (°C)	57 (14)	61 (16)	83 (28)	89 (32)	95 (35)	98 (37)	104 (40)	99 (37)	99 (37)	88 (31)	76 (24)	61 (16)	104 (40)
Mean daily maximum °F (°C)	21.7 (−5.7)	26.2 (−3.2)	37.0 (2.8)	49.0 (9.4)	62.8 (17.1)	71.3 (21.8)	76.9 (24.9)	75.5 (24.2)	67.5 (19.7)	54.0 (12.2)	39.6 (4.2)	27.6 (−2.4)	50.8 (10.4)
Daily mean °F (°C)	14.4 (−9.8)	17.2 (−8.2)	27.5 (−2.5)	39.6 (4.2)	51.7 (10.9)	60.2 (15.7)	66.4 (19.1)	65.9 (18.8)	57.9 (14.4)	46.0 (7.8)	32.6 (0.3)	21.0 (−6.1)	41.7 (5.4)
Mean daily minimum °F (°C)	7.2 (−13.8)	8.2 (−13.2)	17.9 (−7.8)	30.2 (−1.0)	40.5 (4.7)	49.1 (9.5)	56.0 (13.3)	56.3 (13.5)	48.4 (9.1)	38.0 (3.3)	25.5 (−3.6)	14.5 (−9.7)	32.6 (0.3)
Record low °F (°C)	−34 (−37)	−34 (−37)	−25 (−32)	2 (−17)	17 (−8)	25 (−4)	36 (2)	34 (1)	27 (−3)	15 (−9)	−13 (−25)	−24 (−31)	−34 (−37)
Average precipitation inches (mm)	1.70 (43)	1.12 (28)	1.61 (41)	3.08 (78)	3.49 (89)	3.34 (85)	4.11 (104)	3.64 (92)	3.69 (94)	3.15 (80)	2.44 (62)	1.92 (49)	33.29 (846)
Average snowfall inches (cm)	29.5 (75)	15.8 (40)	14.6 (37)	5.1 (13)	0.8 (2.0)	0.0 (0.0)	0.0 (0.0)	0.0 (0.0)	0.0 (0.0)	1.0 (2.5)	13.3 (34)	26.2 (67)	106.3 (270)
Average precipitation days (≥ 0.01 in)	17.5	11.4	11.8	11.0	11.8	11.9	14.1	11.2	14.3	12.8	11.9	14.2	153.9
Average snowy days (≥ 0.1 in)	19.8	12.4	9.9	4.1	0.6	0.0	0.0	0.0	0.0	0.7	9.0	15.2	71.7
Source: NOAA

== Demographics ==
Historical population
Census	Pop.	Note	%±
1880	495		—
1890	1,373		177.4%
1900	1,689		23.0%
1920	1,441		—
1930	1,195		−17.1%
1940	1,212		1.4%
1950	1,153		−4.9%
1960	969		−16.0%
1970	874		−9.8%
1980	778		−11.0%
1990	686		−11.8%
2000	611		−10.9%
2010	487		−20.3%
2020	584		19.9%
U.S. Decennial Census

=== 2020 census ===
As of the census of 2020, the population was 584. The population density was 678.3 inhabitants per square mile (261.9/km^{2}). There were 458 housing units at an average density of 531.9 per square mile (205.4/km^{2}). The racial makeup of the city was 80.1% White, 11.0% Native American, 0.7% Black or African American, 0.2% Asian, 0.5% from other races, and 7.5% from two or more races. Ethnically, the population was 1.5% Hispanic or Latino of any race.

=== 2010 census ===
At the 2010 census there were 487 people in 261 households, including 130 families, in the city. The population density was 566.3 inhabitants per square mile (218.6/km^{2}). There were 482 housing units at an average density of 560.5 per square mile (216.4/km^{2}). The racial makeup of the city was 77.8% White, 0.2% African American, 14.8% Native American, 1.0% Asian, and 6.2% from two or more races. Hispanic or Latino of any race were 1.8%.

Of the 261 households, 16.5% had children under the age of 18 living with them, 39.5% were married couples living together, 8.8% had a female householder with no husband present, 1.5% had a male householder with no wife present, and 50.2% were non-families. 44.1% of households were one person and 18.7% were one person aged 65 or older. The average household size was 1.87 and the average family size was 2.58.

The median age was 53.2 years. 15.4% of residents were under the age of 18; 3.2% were between the ages of 18 and 24; 18.6% were from 25 to 44; 36% were from 45 to 64; 26.9% were 65 or older. The gender makeup of the city was 48.9% male and 51.1% female.

=== 2000 census ===
At the 2000 census there were 611 people in 289 households, including 167 families, in the city. The population density was 703.3 people per square mile (271.2/km^{2}). There were 403 housing units at an average density of 463.8 per square mile (178.8/km^{2}). The racial makeup of the city was 76.92% White, 0.65% Black or African American, 15.22% Native American, 1.31% from other races, and 5.89% from two or more races. Hispanic or Latino of any race were 0.49%. 10.5% were of American, 10.1% German, 9.4% Norwegian, 8.1% Irish, 7.4% Swedish and 5.4% English ancestry according to Census 2000.

Of the 289 households, 22.8% had children under the age of 18 living with them, 41.2% were married couples living together, 11.4% had a female householder with no spouse present, and 41.9% were non-families. 35.6% of households were one person and 15.9% were one person aged 65 or older. The average household size was 2.10 and the average family size was 2.64.

The age distribution was 20.9% under the age of 18, 6.9% from 18 to 24, 21.4% from 25 to 44, 33.1% from 45 to 64, and 17.7% 65 or older. The median age was 45 years. For every 100 females, there were 89.8 males. For every 100 females age 18 and over, there were 85.8 males.

The median household income was $32,266 and the median family income was $36,500. Males had a median income of $34,375 versus $25,875 for females. The per capita income for the city was $18,377. About 10.5% of families and 11.8% of the population were below the poverty line, including 20.5% of those under age 18 and 4.6% of those age 65 or over.

== Arts and culture ==
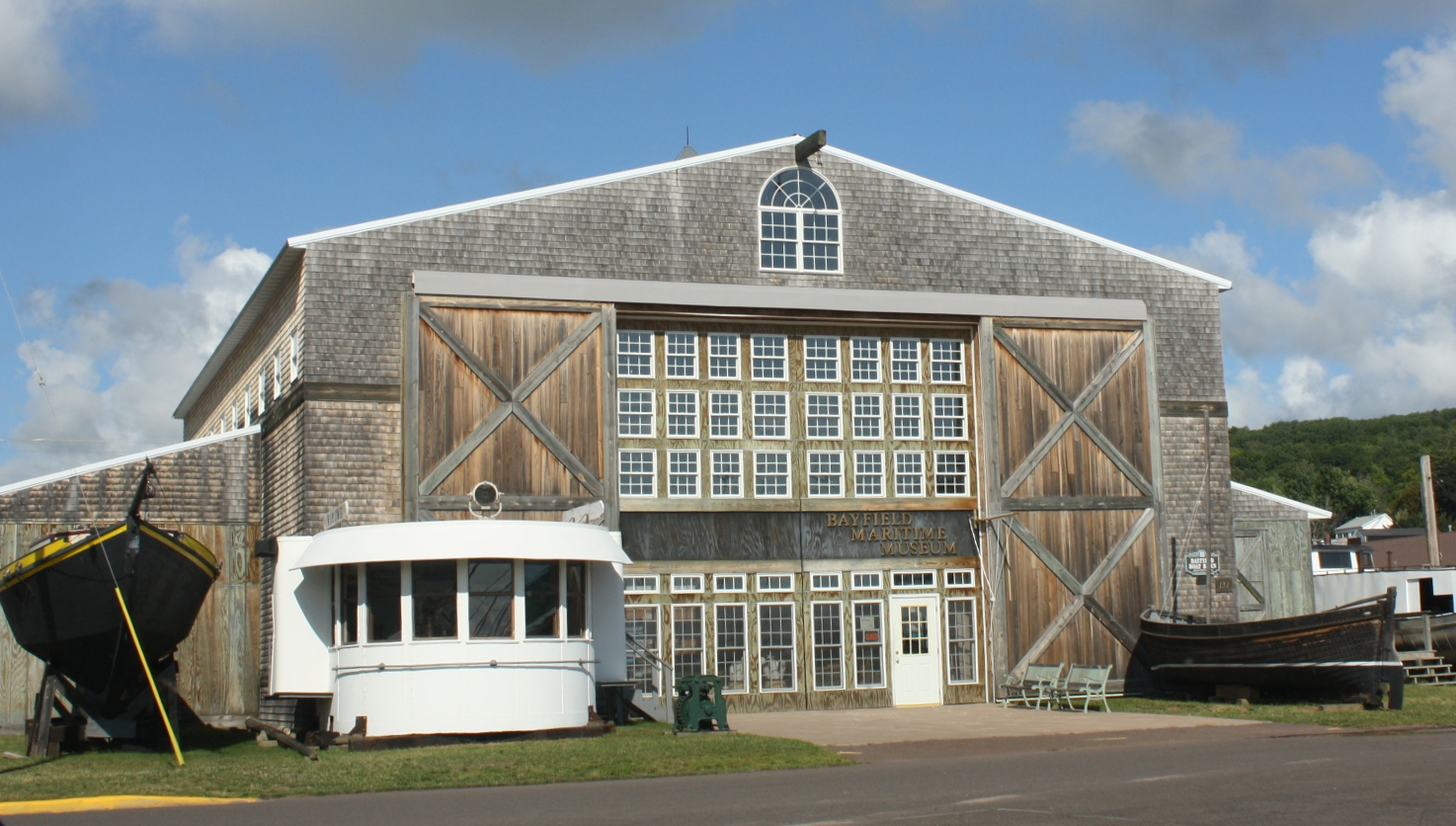
Bayfield Maritime Museum

The Bayfield Maritime Museum and Bayfield Heritage Museum are the city's two museums. There are several art galleries. Nearby is the 950 seats all-canvas tent theater known as Big Top Chautauqua which during its summer season has hosted such entertainers as Willie Nelson and Lyle Lovett.

Bayfield's annual Apple Fest draws about 60,000 visitors during the first weekend in October. Popular summertime events include the Bayfield Race Week regatta, held during the week of the 4th of July, and the Festival of Arts and Gallery Tour, which takes place the third weekend of July. It features artists from across the midwest, along with tours and demos at a diverse array of local galleries.

== Government ==
As of May 7, 2025, there is no current official Mayor of Bayfield. The position was formerly held by Ted Daugherty, but after his resignation the position has been filled in the interim by City Council President Lyn Cornelius.

City of Bayfield vote by party in presidential elections
Year	Democratic	Republican	Third parties
2024	81.2% 306	17.8% 67	1.0% 4
2020	84.2% 314	15.3% 57	0.5% 1

== Recreation ==
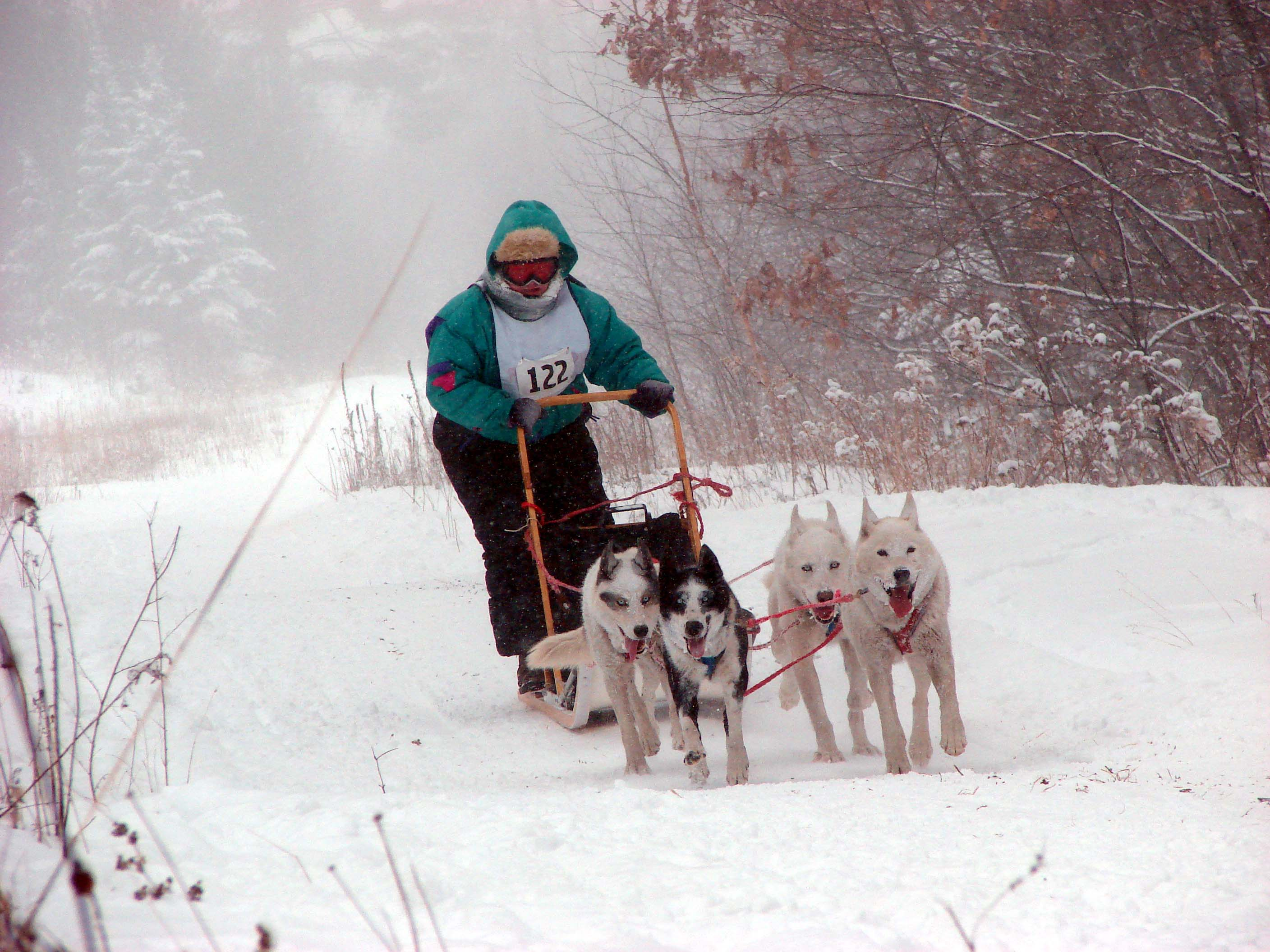
2007 Apostle Island Sled Dog Race

The Apostle Islands Sled Dog Race takes place the first weekend of February. It is the largest sled dog race in the Midwest, with between 50 and 75 teams competing annually.

== Transportation ==
Bus service to the community is provided by Bay Area Rural Transit.

== Media ==
Bayfield receives three radio stations from Ashland; WATW, WBSZ and WJJH. Television stations come from the Duluth–Superior market; KDLH, KBJR, WDSE and WDIO.

== Gallery ==
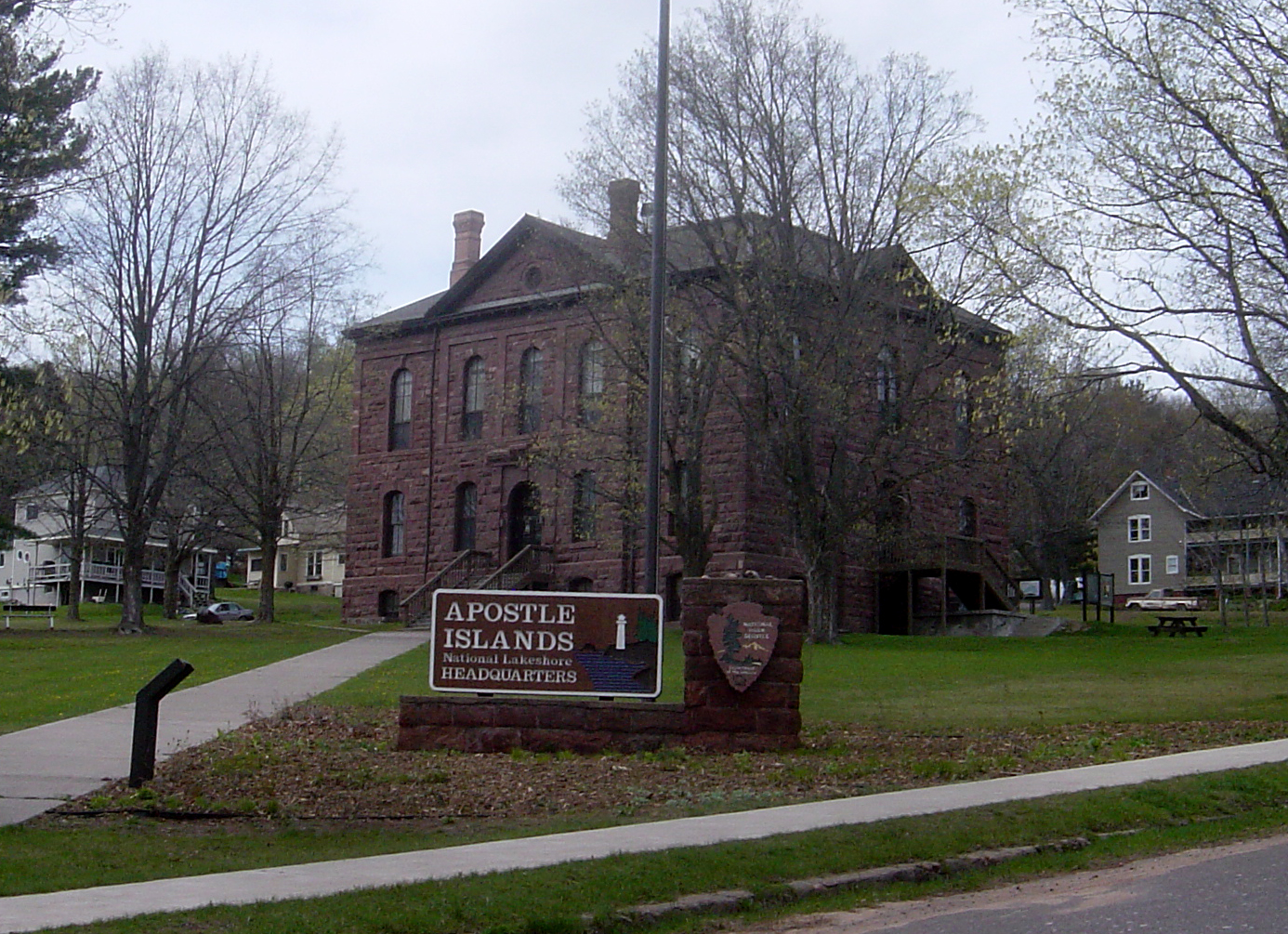
The headquarters of the Apostle Islands National Lakeshore, in Bayfield, is actually made out of rock quarried from the islands before they were made a park

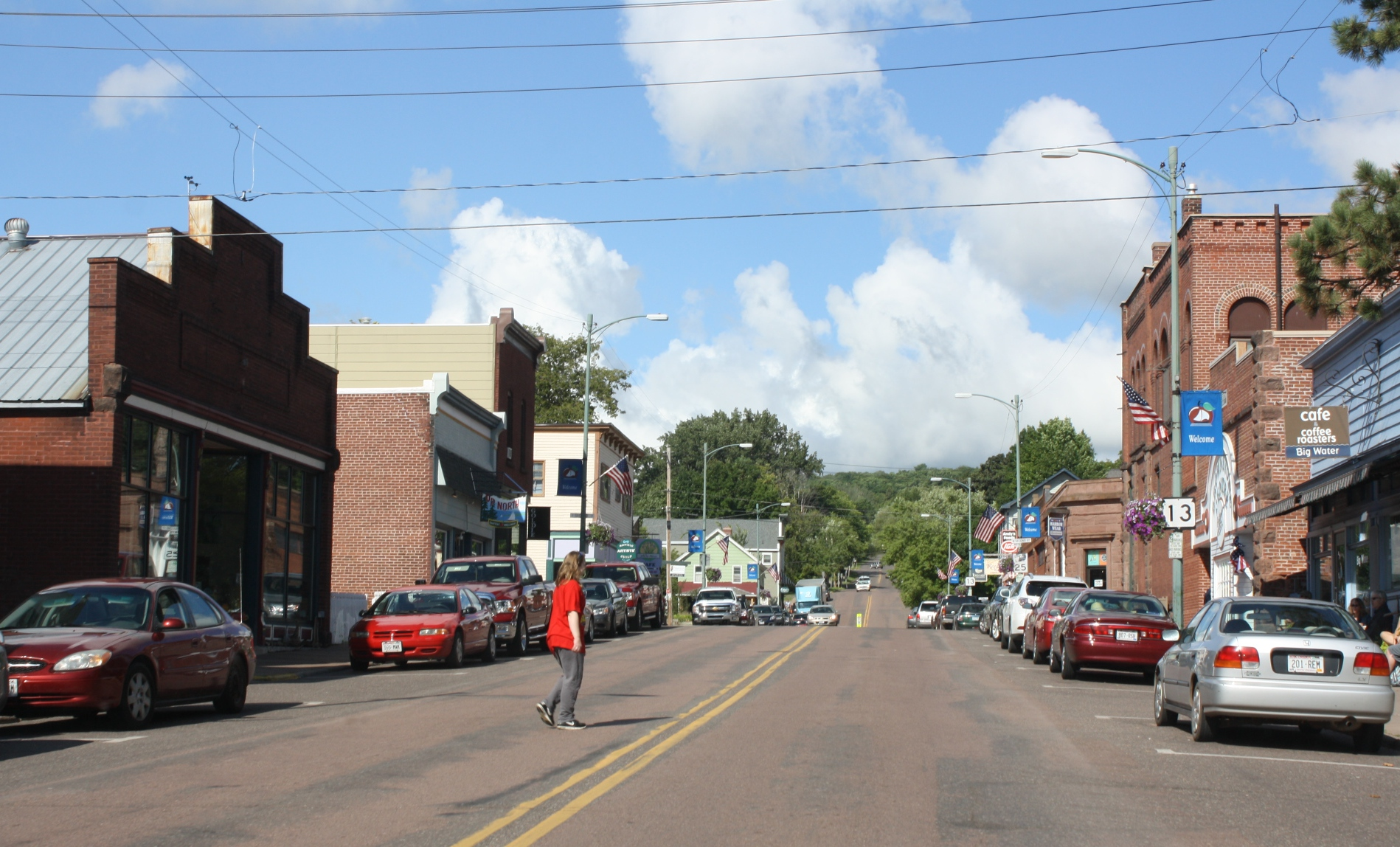
Downtown Bayfield

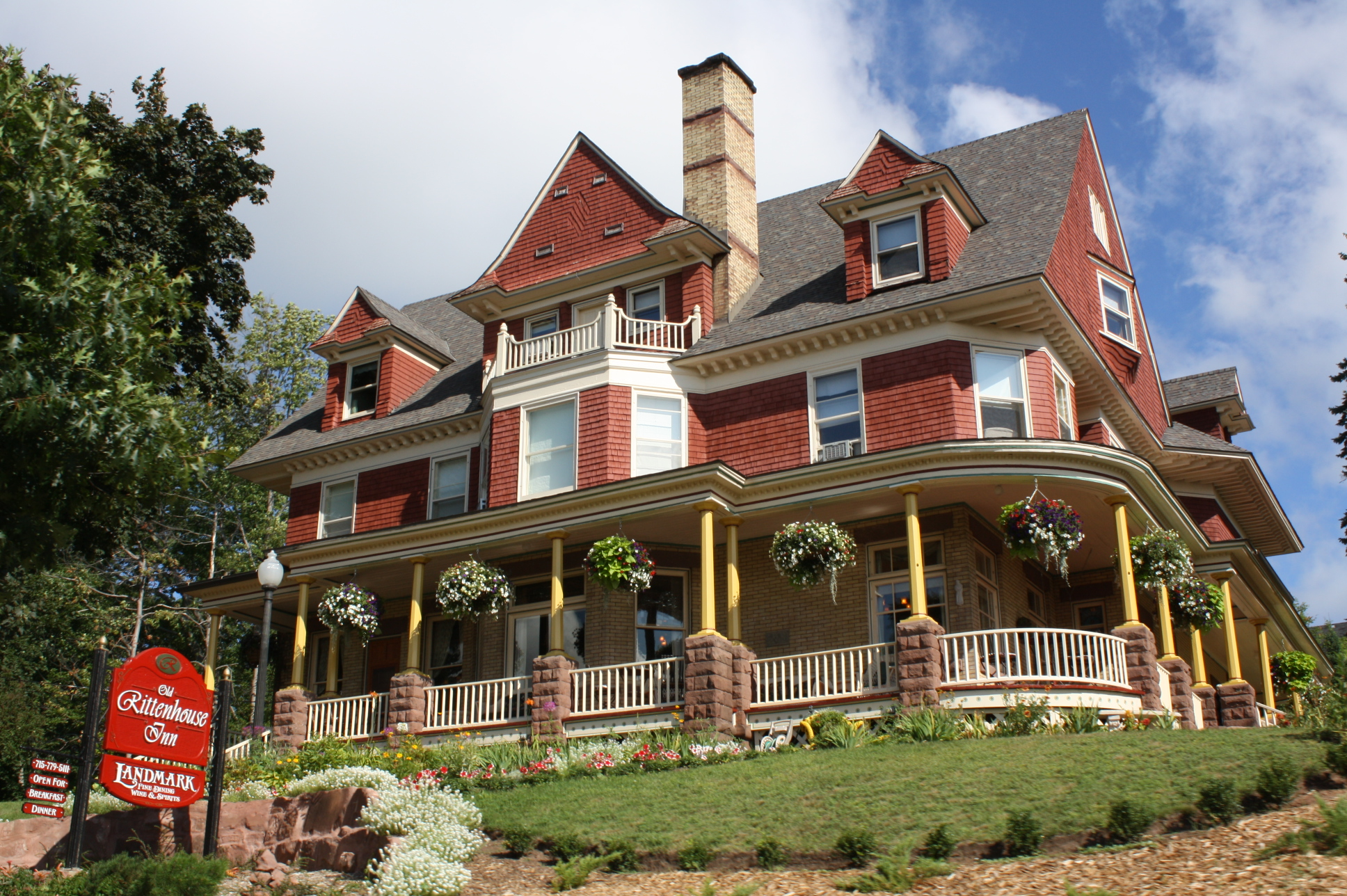
Rittenhouse Inn

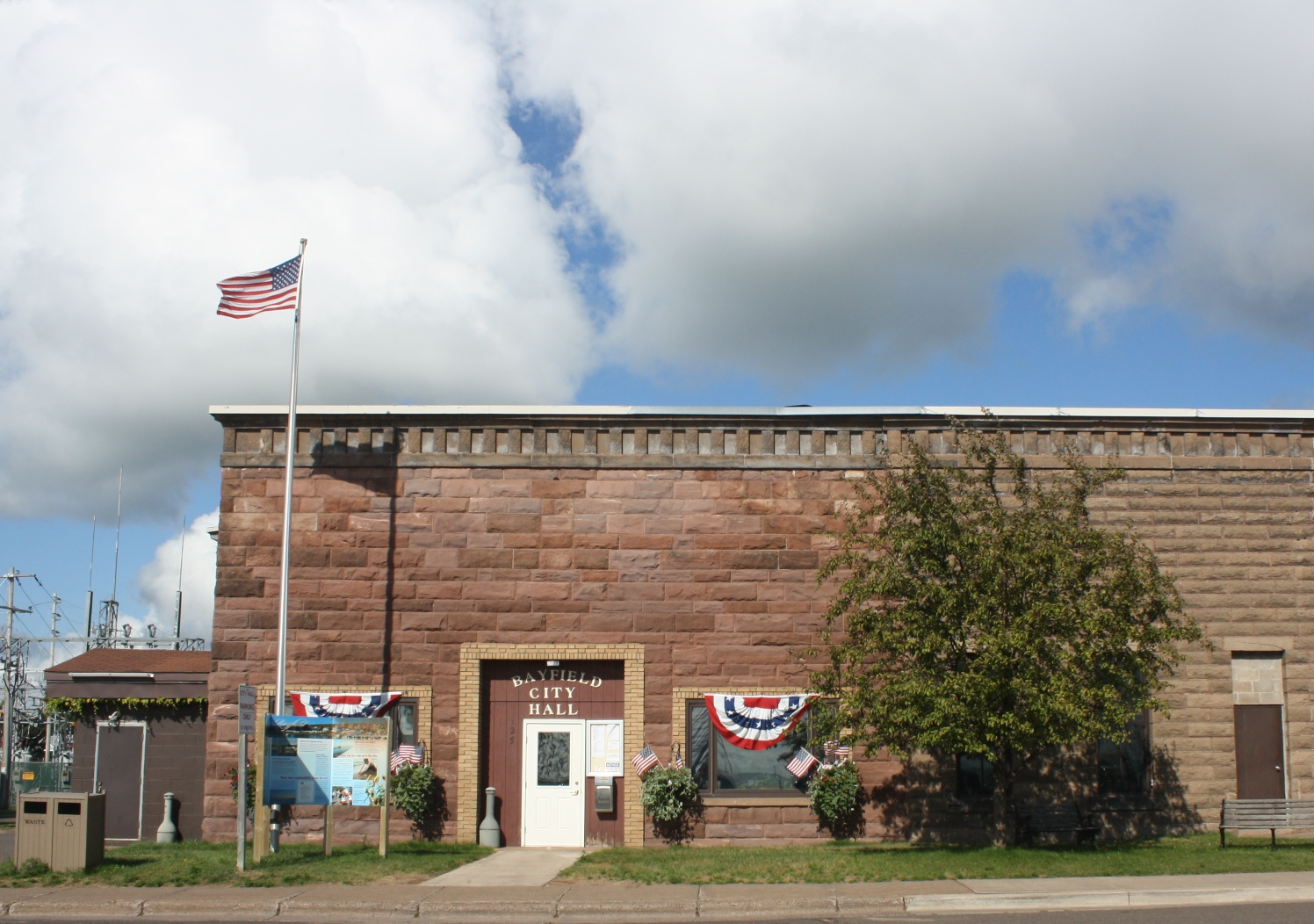
City hall

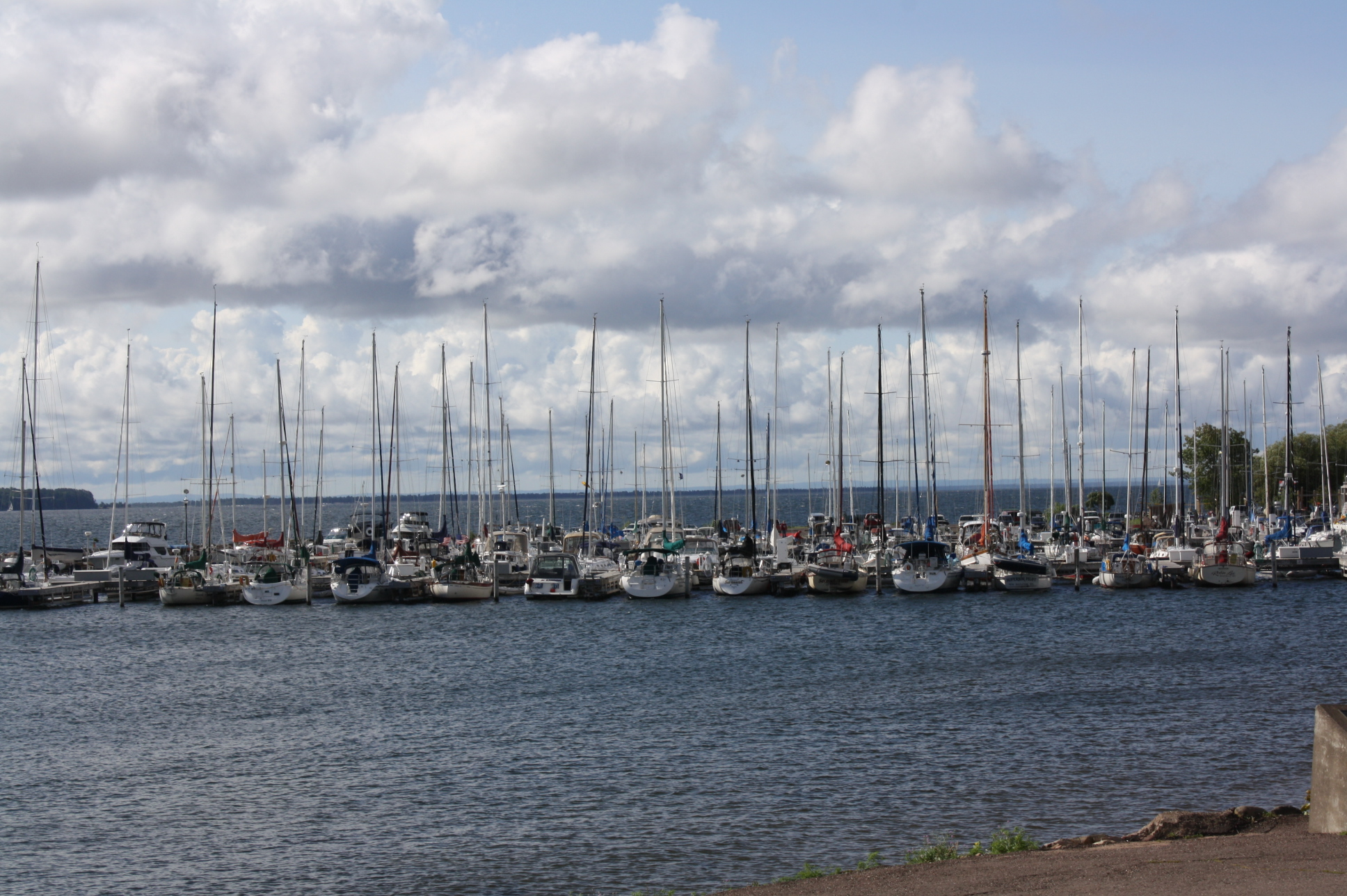
Bayfield Marina

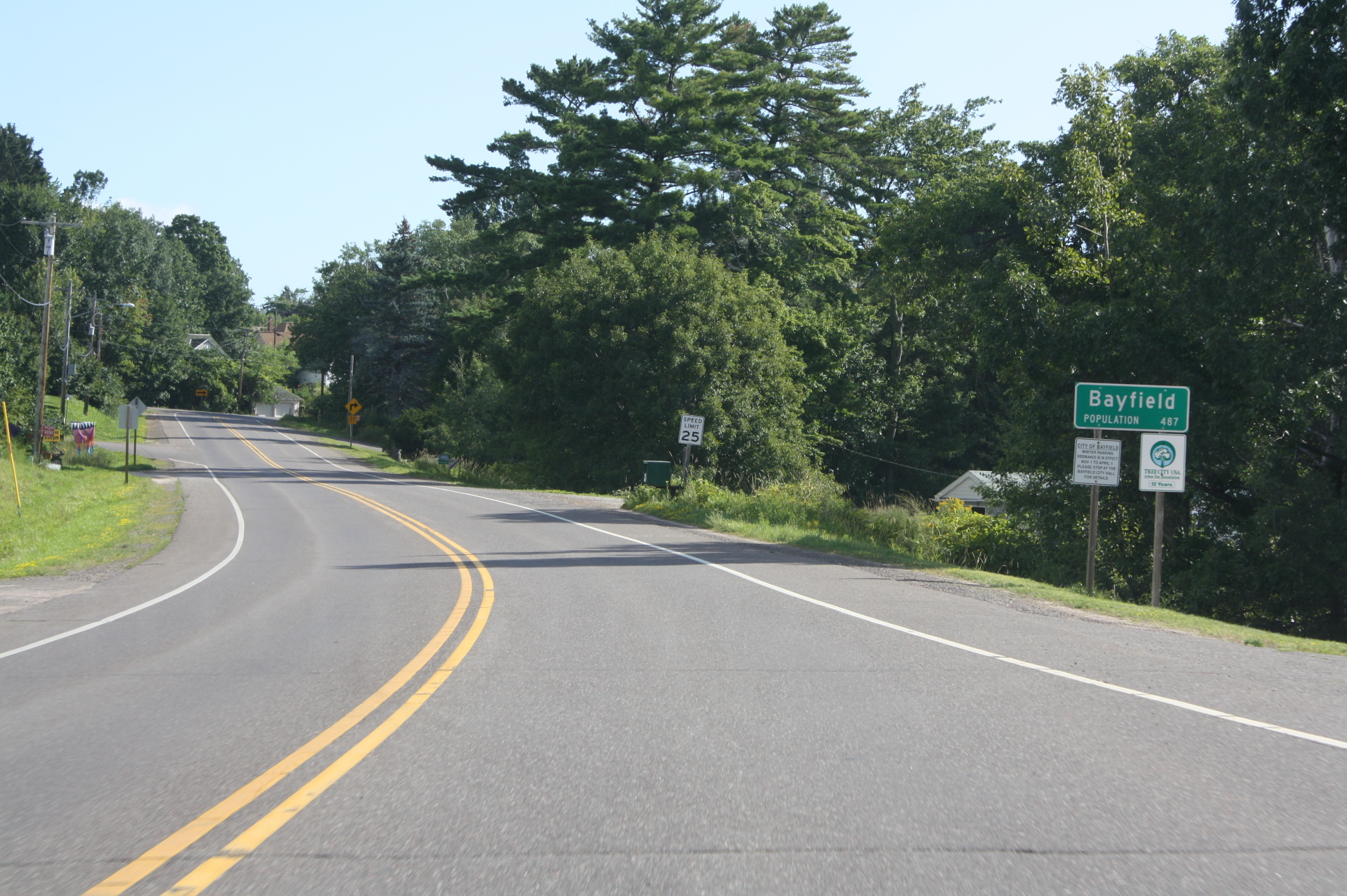
Bayfield sign

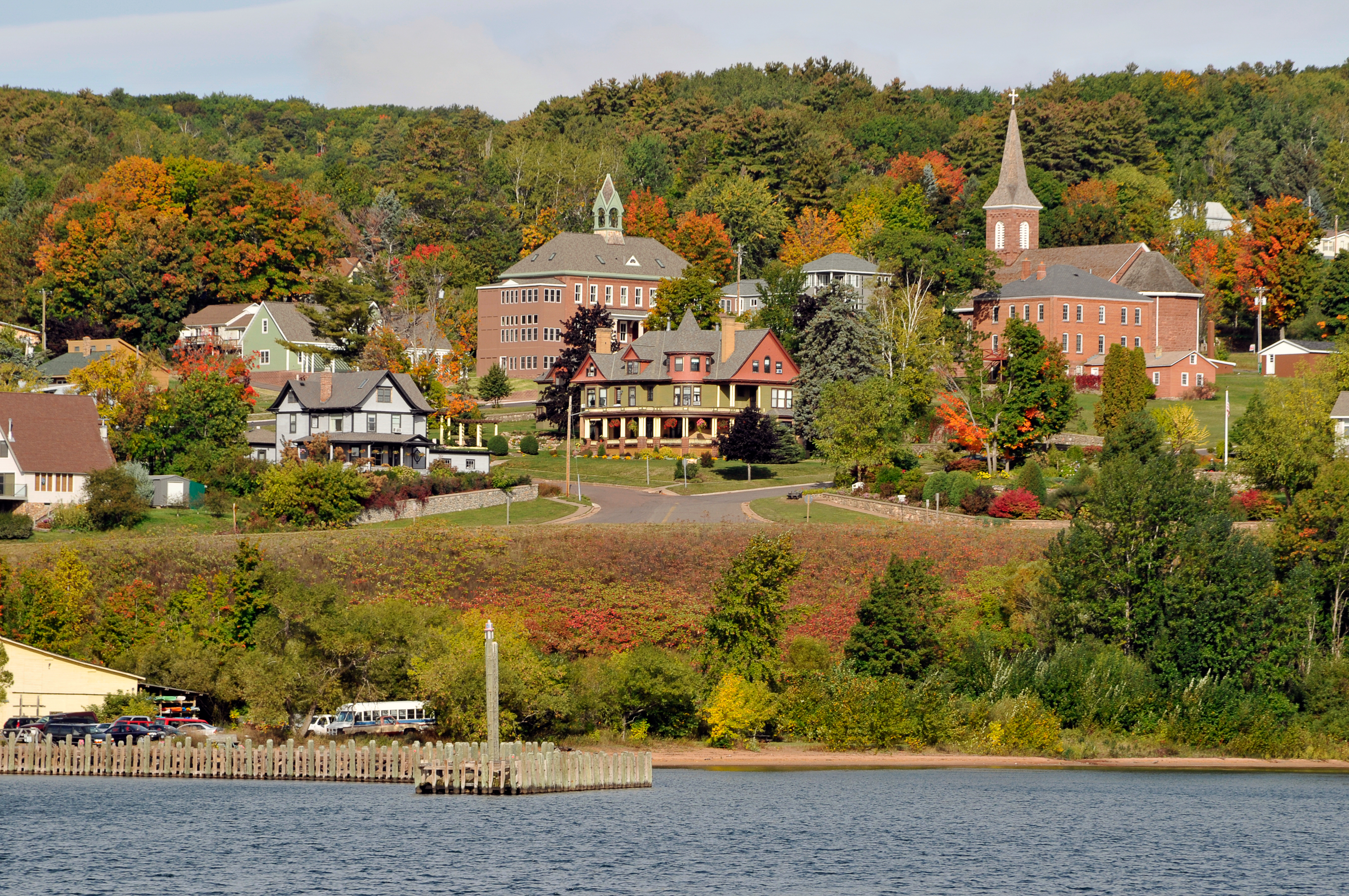
Bayfield, Wisconsin seen from the harbor

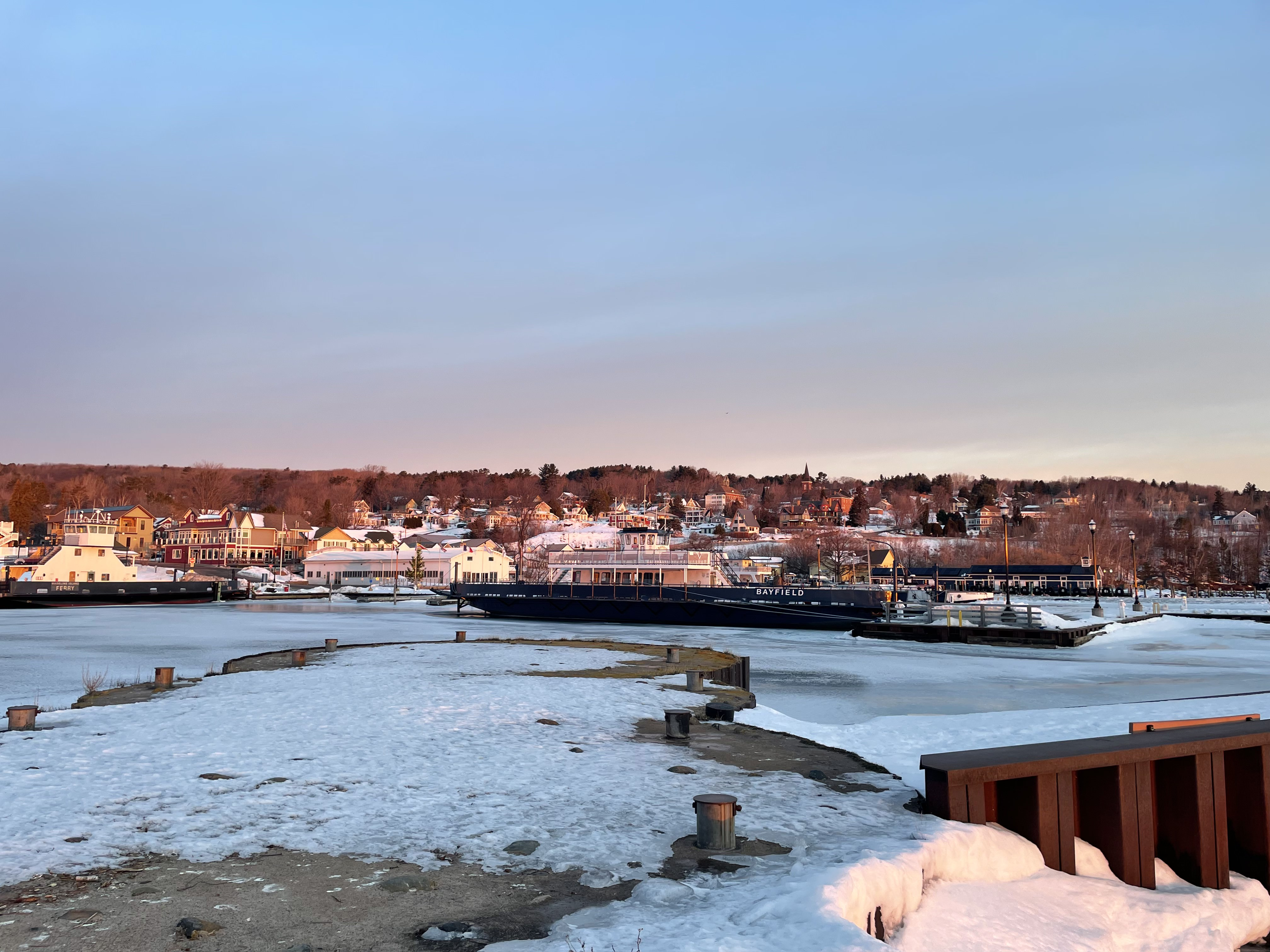
Bayfield in winter

== Notable people ==
- Laurie E. Carlson, Wisconsin State Representative, 1937–42, born in Bayfield
- Norris J. Nelson, Los Angeles City Council member, 1939–43, born in Bayfield
- Nathan Van Cleave, Composer for Television, including "The Twilight Zone," born in Bayfield
- Lou Alta Melton (1895 – 1974), an American civil engineer and bridge engineer

== See also ==
- Bayfield group
