= Raspberry Island =

Raspberry Island may refer to:

- Raspberry Island (Alaska)
- Raspberry Island (Minnesota)
  - Minnesota Boat Club Boathouse on Raspberry Island
- Raspberry Island (Wisconsin)
  - Raspberry Island Light
