= Sand Island Light (Wisconsin) =

Lighthouse in Wisconsin, United States

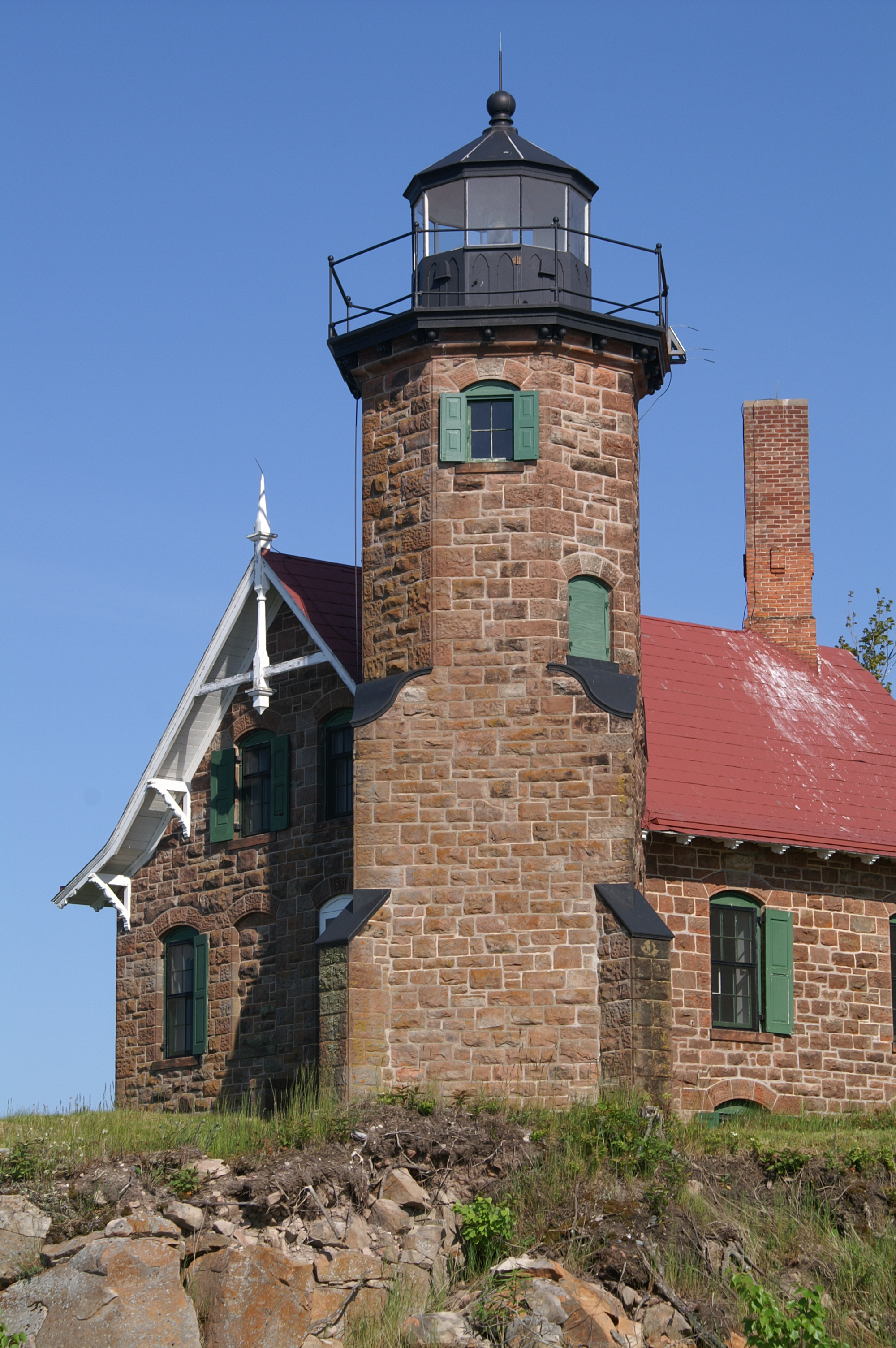
- Location: Sand Island, Wisconsin
- Coordinates: 47°00′11.91″N 90°56′14.72″W

Tower
- Foundation: Stone
- Construction: Sandstone
- Automated: 1921
- Height: 42 feet (13 m)
- Shape: Octagonal
- Heritage: National Register of Historic Places contributing property

Light
- First lit: 1881
- Focal height: 56 feet (17 m)
- Lens: Fourth order Fresnel lens (original), SeaLite LED Marine Lantern (current)
- Range: 9 nautical miles (17 km; 10 mi)
- Characteristic: White, flashing, 6 s

The Sand Island Light is a lighthouse located on the northern tip of Sand Island, one of the Apostle Islands, in Lake Superior in Bayfield County, Wisconsin, near the city of Bayfield.

Currently owned by the National Park Service and part of the Apostle Islands National Lakeshore, it was added to the National Register of Historic Places in 1977, part of reference number 77000145. Listed in the Library of Congress Historic American Buildings Survey, WI-313.

The Sand Island lighthouse consists of an octagonal tower and attached two-story dwelling, all built from brown sandstone cut from the promontory on which it stands. Visitors to the lighthouse today can still see marks on the rock ledges in front of the lighthouse that were made in the process of quarrying. The lighthouse was built to a standard Gothic Revival design already used at several light stations in Wisconsin and Michigan. The lighthouses previously built at McGulpin Point, Eagle Harbor, and White River, along with the St. Clair Flats Canal beacon (no longer standing), follow the same plan, while the Chambers Island lighthouse is a “mirror twin” to the Sand Island structure, with the same design reversed right to left. Unlike these others, which were made out of brick, the Sand Island lighthouse is constructed of brown sandstone, quarried from the ledge where it sits. Subsequently, additional stone excavated at Sand Island was transported to Passage Island near Isle Royale where it was used to construct an additional mirror twin lighthouse.

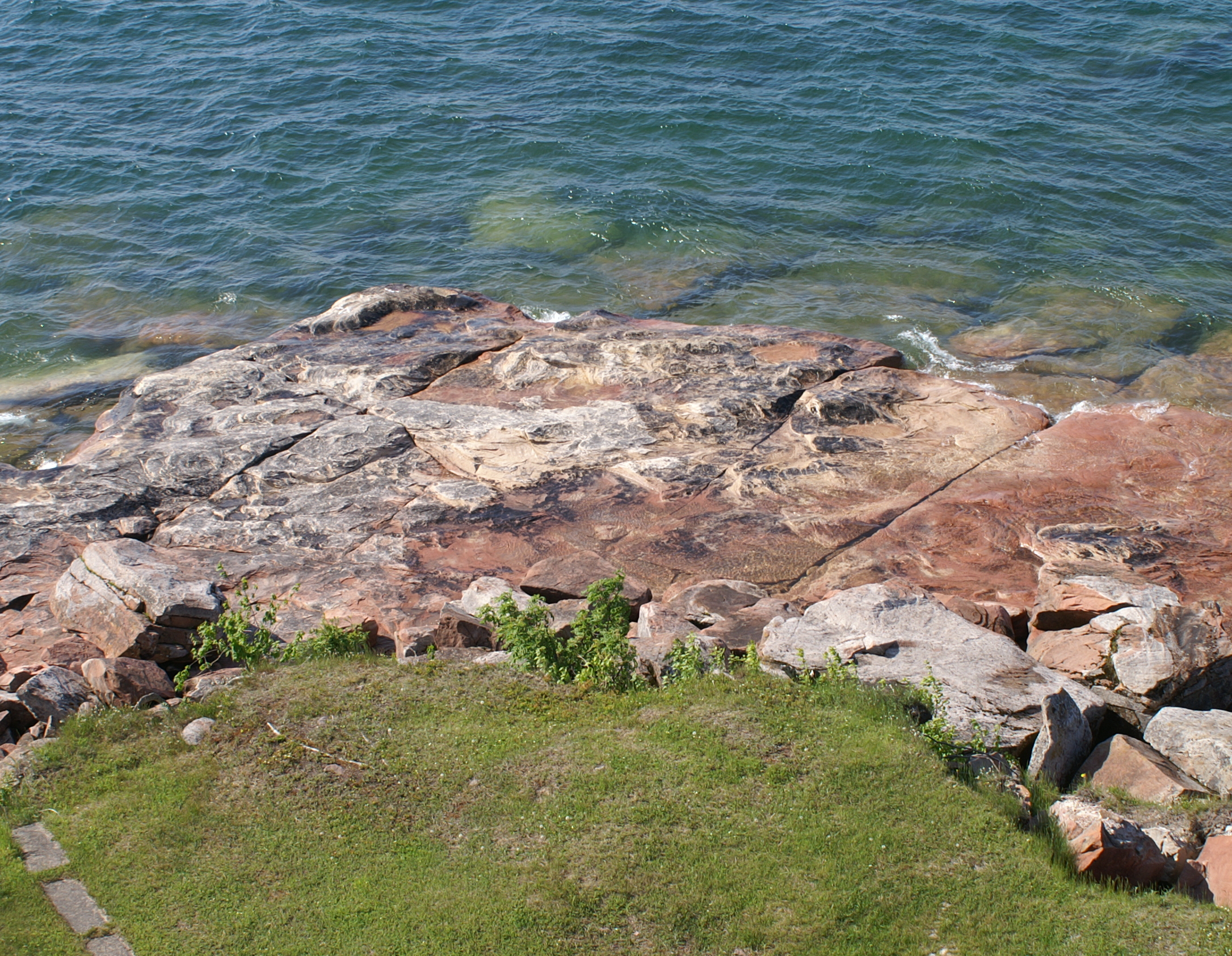
Evidence of quarrying on the ledge in front of the Sand Island Lighthouse, seen from the tower.

== Early history ==
In 1871, the Lighthouse Board asked Congress for funds to construct a lighthouse on Sand Island to guide ships toward the Raspberry Island Light and mark the western edge of the Apostle Islands, noting,

Incoming from Duluth the Raspberry Island light is not visible until abreast of Sand Island, and there being no coast light in this distance of 80 miles, causes much distress and danger to the increasing commerce of the west end of Lake Superior. An appropriation of $18,000 for the building of this station is recommended.

However, Congress rejected this and several subsequent requests until finally appropriating funds for the lighthouse in 1880. Construction began on June 6, 1881, when a crew under the direction of Superintendent Lewis Lederle began clearing the heavily wooded area, excavating a site for the foundation and basement, and cutting stone from the shoreline ledges for use as building material. The structure, comprising a 26-by-30-foot (7.9 by 9.1 m) two-story dwelling, a 44-foot-tall (13 m) tower, and a small lean-to summer kitchen at the rear, would be finished by the end of that summer. As the lighthouse neared completion, a fixed white Fourth Order Fresnel lens was placed in the lantern room, and the light was displayed for the first time on September 25, 1881. Charles Lederle, nephew of the construction superintendent, was appointed acting Keeper, and was confirmed as permanent Keeper the following year.

Lederle’s tenure at the lighthouse was distinguished by his heroic rescue of the crew of the Canadian steamer Prussia, which caught fire about ten miles off Sand Island on Sept. 12, 1885. Rowing the light station boat into heavy seas, Lederle was able to reach one of the ship’s lifeboats which was being blown toward the open lake by the gale. Transferring all seven men aboard to his own boat, Lederle brought them safely back to land. The Prussia’s captain and officers later sent Lederle a letter of thanks stating that had he not come to their aid, “ ...the yawl boat and crew… would most likely have been lost as there was a heavy sea running against the southeast and they were unable to pull up against it)

Another noteworthy event took place on July 15, 1884, when Lederle’s wife Marguerite gave birth at the lighthouse. According to the local newspaper, “Lightkeeper Lederle of Sand Island rejoices over the arrival of an assistant lightkeeper who arrived Tuesday evening."

When Lederle’s children reached school age, he arranged for a transfer to the position of Keeper at the Two Harbors Light in Minnesota. Emmanuel Luick, the first assistant at the Outer Island Lighthouse, at the opposite end of the archipelago, was offered the position of Keeper at the Sand Island Light, and arrived there on April 1, 1892, to put the lighthouse in operation for the season.

Luick was single during his first few years at the lighthouse, but in February 1896, he married 16-year-old Ella Richardson in Providence, Rhode Island. From then on, in a departure from usual practice, Ella would often fill in the day’s entries in the light station’s logbook instead of her husband. In contrast to the terse accounts of weather and station upkeep typically found in these journals, Ella treated the logbook more like a personal diary, detailing each days’ events in her life. Her log entries provide a valuable source of information on daily life at the light station during that era.

These daily journals also show that Ella was frequently left on her own for several days at a time to tend the light while her husband went to the mainland to get mail and supplies. They also detail an episode in 1901 when Emmanuel Luick fell ill and was incapacitated for three weeks at the end of the shipping season. During that time, 22-year-old Ella took on the responsibilities both of caring for her sick husband during the day and tending the lamp through the night, then finally completing the numerous chores involved in closing the lighthouse for the winter.

Perhaps in response to this episode, the Lighthouse Service authorized an Assistant Keeper position at the start of the following year. Luick went through fifteen assistants in his subsequent years at the lighthouse, and on two occasions, Ella was appointed as acting Assistant Keeper during the interim period after one of them left, briefly receiving a salary for her work until a man could be found for the job.

Ella Luick would not remain at the lighthouse through her husband’s entire tenure as Keeper. On May 9, 1905, she boarded a steamer for nearby Bayfield and never returned to the island or her husband again. The couple’s divorce became final in 1906, and census records show that Ella returned to her native Rhode Island where she embarked on a new career in nursing, and eventually remarried.

In 1911, Luick, now 44, married 23-year-old Harriet Oramill Buck, a native of Iron River, Wisconsin. Oramill, as she was known, eventually gave birth to four children, including one who was born at the lighthouse, but only two of her children survived infancy. Oramill’s life on the island was very different from that of Luick’s first wife: with an Assistant Keeper already assigned to the station, she was never asked to tend the lamp, nor left at the station alone. Over the course of his time as Keeper, Luick went through fifteen assistants, with the longest tenure being only two years.

== The Wreck of the Sevona ==
The most memorable event of Emmanuel Luick’s time on Sand Island was the sinking of the steamer Sevona on Sept. 2, 1905. The Sevona was actually one of two ships lost off the Apostle Islands that day; several hours later, the wooden schooner barge Pretoria went down off Outer Island with the loss of five men.

Built in 1890, the 372-foot Sevona was one of the largest ships on the Great Lakes at the time. It had left the Allouez ore docks, near Superior, Wisconsin, the previous evening, bound for Erie, Pennsylvania with 6,000 tons of iron ore and twenty-four men and women aboard. At 2:00 a.m. the next morning, with the weather worsening rapidly, the captain decided to seek shelter among the Apostle Islands. Slowing to half speed in the blinding conditions, the Sevona struck the Sand Island shoal, breaking in half about 1.5 miles northeast of the lighthouse.

With both of the ship’s lifeboats in the aft section, the crew and passengers there survived after struggling to reach land. One boat reached Sand Island's East Bay settlement two miles south of the lighthouse, while the other fought wind and waves for six hours before coming ashore on the mainland at Little Sand Bay. With no lifeboats forward, the seven men in that section did their best to construct a makeshift raft to reach safety, but it capsized in the surf and all seven aboard lost their lives.

Though many modern accounts describe lightkeeper Luick as watching helplessly from his tower while the drama unfolded, the station logbook shows otherwise. The keeper’s entry that day reads,

“Sept. 2. At 5:45 a.m. a steamer whistled a distress, not visible, but for fog and heavy raining. We were unable to see or tell where the steamer was, only knew she was NE of the station. At 10 am, it clear up some so we could see a steamer drifting in/out the East side of the station where she soon struck bottom. We could see no life on board or see any distress signal. We patrolled the beach from 10 to 12 but found nothing.”

This confusion may have arisen due to Luick’s habit of embellishing the story in later years, placing himself in an unearned role as a hero. One example can be seen in an interview he gave on the occasion of his 1937 retirement, in which he told the reporter that he went out in a small boat that night and saved the lives of four men, including the captain. (In the same interview, he described living a “solitary, Robinson Crusoe existence” for his first nine years at the lighthouse until an assistant arrived, writing his first wife Ella out of the story entirely.)

== Automation ==
In 1921 the Sand Island light was the first among the Apostle Islands light stations to be automated, and Luick transferred to the Grand Marais light station in Minnesota, where he eventually retired in 1937. Automating the beacon was made possible by the use of the Dalén Sun Valve developed by Swedish inventor Gustaf Dalén. This device focused the rays of the sun on metal rods, functioning much like a modern thermostat. As the rods’ temperature changed, they would expand or contract, opening or closing a valve which allowed acetylene gas to flow to the lamp where a pilot light would ignite it. This complex system was delicate, so keepers at the nearby Raspberry Island Lighthouse were given the additional duty of checking the visibility of the Sand Island light every night, relighting the lamp when necessary, and taking regular readings of the gas pressure remaining in the acetylene tanks.

Some time around 1933, the Lighthouse Service removed the automatic beacon from the lighthouse lantern, and moved it to a newly-constructed 50-foot (15 m) steel tower in front of the lighthouse. The original Fresnel lens was removed at this time, and its disposition is unknown. The automated light remained on the tower until 1985, when the Coast Guard removed the tower and placed the apparatus back in the lighthouse.

== Post Automation ==
With no need for a resident keeper, the lighthouse sat vacant for several years. However, in 1925, a young St. Paul schoolteacher, Gertrude Wellisch, who’d spent many summers at a vacation home on the island partly owned by her family, persuaded the Commerce Department to lease her the vacant lighthouse. The terms of the lease, at $25.00 per year, gave Wellisch responsibility for maintaining the structure, a duty the single woman discharged faithfully with the occasional help of family and friends.

Wellisch was the first of three private citizens to take responsibility for the lighthouse after automation, setting a precedent that was critical in preserving the structure for the next fifty years. In 1937, when control of the island was shifted from the Commerce Department to the U.S. Forest Service of the Department of Agriculture, Wellisch offered to buy the lighthouse from the government, but her proposal failed due to disagreements over the price. It appears she continued to lease the building for several more years, but in 1941 she purchased a parcel of land on the island and a summer cottage constructed that she occupied no later than 1943.

Shortly afterward, in either 1943 or 1944, the Forest Service rented the lighthouse to Ashland, Wisconsin newspaper publisher and politician John Chapple about 1943. Chapple rented the building for a number of years, then in 1953 he was replaced by Minnesota businessman A.D. Hulings, who held his lease until the U.S. National Park Service, new owners of Sand Island, terminated the arrangement in 1975

== Getting there ==
National Park Service volunteers provide guided tours of the lighthouse during the summer season, usually between the hours of 12:00 and 4:00 pm. There is no scheduled boat service to Sand Island, but located two miles from the mainland, the island is a popular destination for boaters and kayakers who are prepared for the challenges of Lake Superior. The nearest dock on the island is at the East Bay campground, about two miles away by trail.

== See also ==
- Wisconsin lighthouses
- Apostle Islands Lighthouses
