= Outer Island Light =

Lighthouse in Wisconsin, United States

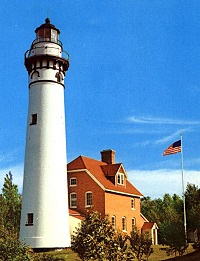
- Location: Wisconsin
- Coordinates: 47°04′35.5″N 90°25′00.11″W

Tower
- Foundation: Stone
- Construction: Brick with Italianate bracketing
- Automated: 1961
- Height: 90 feet (27 m)
- Shape: Frustum of a cone with attached brownstone keeper's house
- Markings: White with black trim and lantern
- Heritage: National Register of Historic Places contributing property

Light
- First lit: 1874
- Focal height: 130 feet (40 m)
- Lens: Third-order Fresnel lens (original), solar powered Vega VRB-25 (current)
- Range: 12 nautical miles (22 km; 14 mi)
- Characteristic: White, flashing, 10 sec

The Outer Island lighthouse is a lighthouse located on the northern tip of Outer Island, one of the Apostle Islands, in Lake Superior in Ashland County, Wisconsin, near the city of Bayfield.

The light was designed by United States Lighthouse Board Eleventh District Chief Engineer Orlando Poe and constructed under the supervision of his successor, Godfrey Weitzel.

Currently owned by the National Park Service and part of the Apostle Islands National Lakeshore, it was added to the National Register of Historic Places in 1977, part of reference number 77000145. It is listed in the Library of Congress Historic American Buildings Survey, WI-318. The lighthouse is attached to a two-story, red brick keeper's quarters.

== Access ==
Most of the Apostle Islands light stations may be reached on the Apostle Islands Cruise Service water taxi or by private boat during the summer. During the Annual Apostle Island Lighthouse Celebration ferry tour service is available for all the lighthouses. In the tourist season, volunteer park rangers are on many of the islands to greet visitors.

== Erosion control ==
In 2004–2005, the National Park Service undertook a significant erosion control project at Outer Island, to stabilize the bluff which had proved susceptible to erosion since the station's earliest days. The project followed a similar effort completed the previous year at the Raspberry Island Lighthouse, and consisted of a three-part strategy: armoring the cliff base with a massive stone wall; improving drainage on the upper grounds to prevent runoff from undercutting the clay bank; and stabilizing the bluff face with "bio-engineering," i.e. planting carefully selected vegetation to anchor the slope. The rock wall at the bottom and drainage system at the top were completed, but a shortage of funds required scaling back the bio-engineering plans, and only the most critical sections of the bluff face were treated.

== Notable incidents ==
On September 2, 1905, Outer Island Keeper John Irvine performed a heroic rescue, when the 337-foot, three-masted schooner-barge Pretoria lost the line to its towing steamer Venezuela during a fierce storm. The Pretoria attempted to anchor about 1.5 miles (2.4 km) off the island, but when the ship began to break up, the ten-man crew attempted to flee in a lifeboat. Sixty-one-year-old keeper Irvine was alone on the island, his assistants having gone to town, but when the lifeboat flipped in the surf, he waded into the waves and rescued five of the ten men. On that same night, the steamer Sevona also sank in the Apostle Islands, striking a reef near the Sand Island Lighthouse, with the loss of seven men. This double tragedy preceded the better-known Mataafa Storm by several weeks.

== See also ==
- Apostle Islands Lighthouses
