= Apostle Islands Lighthouses =

- U.S. National Register of Historic Places
- U.S. Historic district
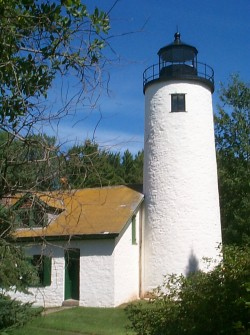
- The original Michigan Island light, one of the six lighthouses listed

- Location within Wisconsin Location within the United States
- Nearest city: Bayfield, Wisconsin
- Built: 1857
- Architect: U.S. Lighthouse Service
- NRHP reference No.: 77000145
- Added to NRHP: March 8, 1977

There are several historic lighthouses on Lake Superior on or near the Apostle Islands in Wisconsin. Six of these lighthouses, all in the Apostle Islands National Lakeshore, were listed as a group on the National Register of Historic Places in 1977 under the name Apostle Islands Lighthouses.

The lighthouses are generally located at the edge of the group of islands, as beacons to guide shipping through and around the islands. The need for guidance increased in 1855 when the Soo Locks opened, connecting Lake Superior to the St. Lawrence Seaway to the east. Shipping also increased as Duluth-Superior grew, and with the opening of Ashland's first ore dock in 1886.

The Apostle Islands lighthouses are popular among tourists. Lighthouse historian Terry Pepper has described them as "one of the more interesting geographically centered collection of [lighthouse] structures" in the United States. Another lighthouse historian, F. Ross Holland, has called them "the largest and finest single collection of lighthouses in the country."

The following lighthouses were included in the 1977 National Register listing:

- Michigan Island Lighthouse 1857 (Two lighthouses located at this site)
- Raspberry Island Lighthouse 1862
- Outer Island Lighthouse 1874
- Sand Island Light 1881
- Devils Island Lighthouse 1891

Other lighthouses are in the area, but are not included in the Apostle Islands Lighthouses listing:

- La Pointe Lighthouse and Chequamegon Point Lighthouse (listed together as the La Pointe Light Station, #83003366)
- Ashland Harbor Breakwater Lighthouse - In the vicinity, but not technically in the Apostle Islands.
- Gull Island Light, Gull Island

Major restoration projects were initiated at several of the lighthouses of the Apostle Islands in 2013.

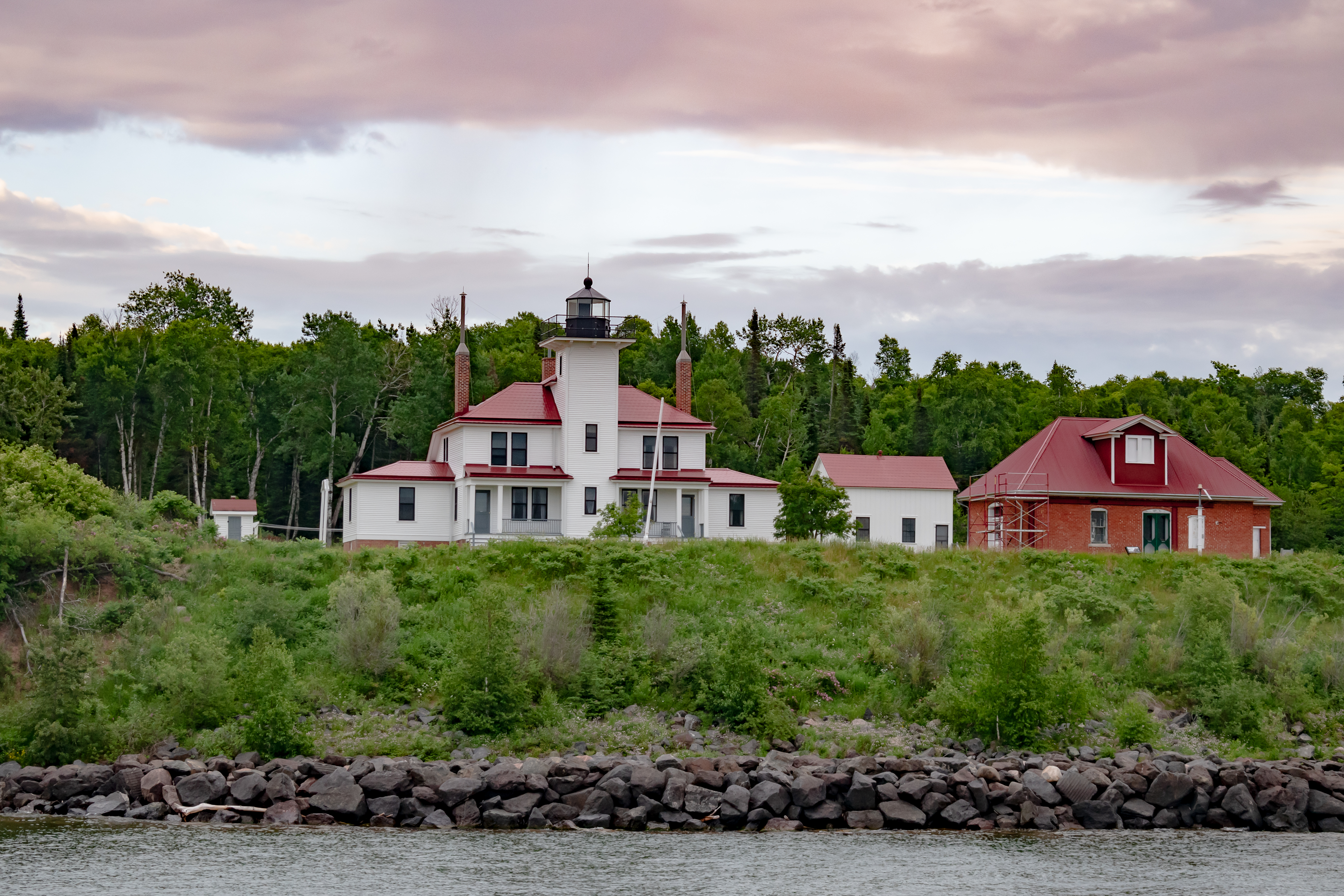
Raspberry Island Lighthouse

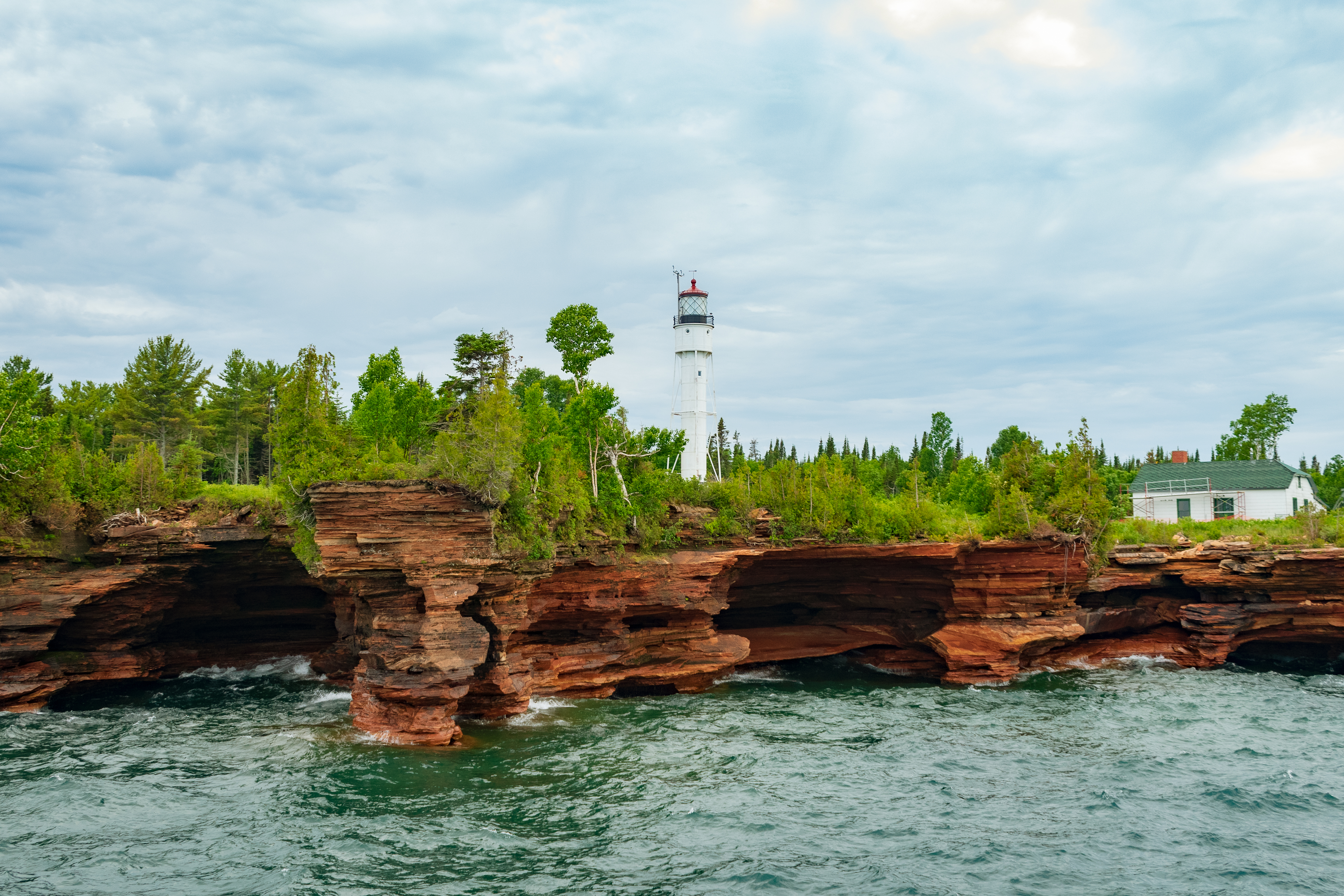
Devils Island Lighthouse
