= Sand Island Light =

Sand Island Light may refer to:

- Sand Island Light (Alabama) at the mouth of Mobile Bay
- Sand Island Light (Wisconsin) in Lake Superior
