= Sam Fifield =

19th century American businessman and politician

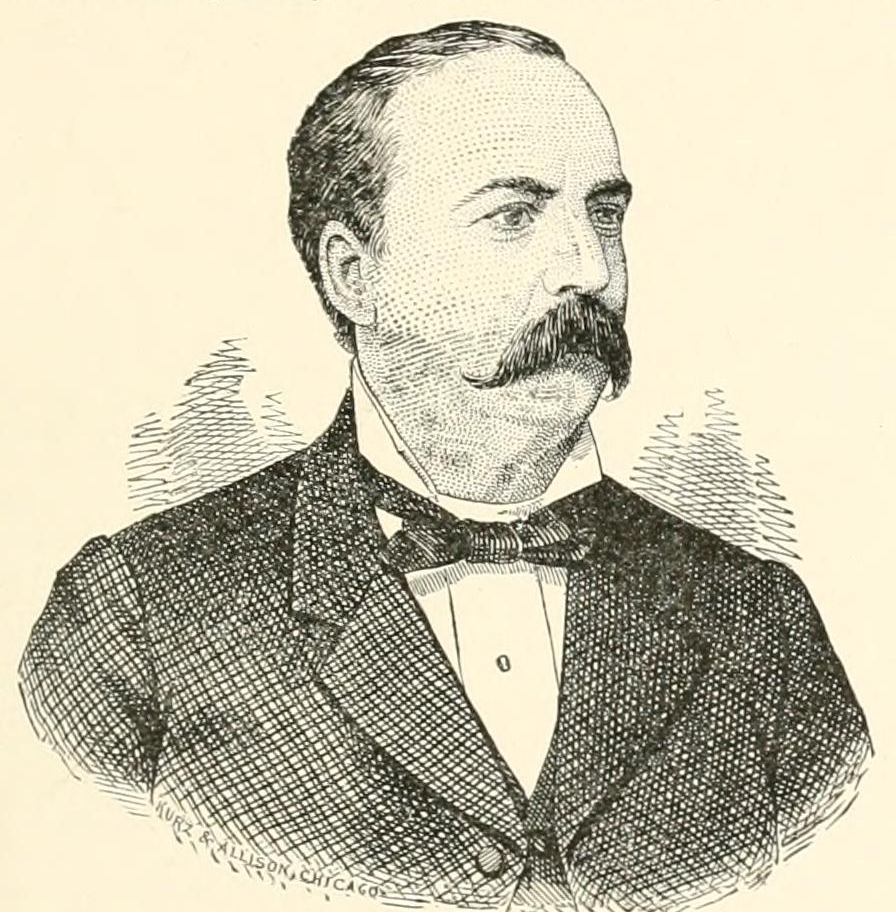

14th Lieutenant Governor of Wisconsin
- In office January 2, 1882 – January 3, 1887
- Governor: Jeremiah Rusk
- Preceded by: James M. Bingham
- Succeeded by: George W. Ryland

26th Speaker of the Wisconsin Assembly
- In office January 12, 1876 – January 1, 1877
- Preceded by: Frederick W. Horn
- Succeeded by: John B. Cassoday

Member of the Wisconsin Senate from the 24th district
- In office January 1, 1880 – January 1, 1882
- Preceded by: Dana Reed Bailey
- Succeeded by: James Hill
- In office January 1, 1877 – January 1, 1878
- Preceded by: Henry D. Barron
- Succeeded by: Dana Reed Bailey

Member of the Wisconsin State Assembly from the Ashland-Barron-Bayfield-Burnett-Douglas-Polk district
- In office January 1, 1874 – January 1, 1877
- Preceded by: Henry D. Barron
- Succeeded by: Woodbury S. Grover

Personal details
- Born: June 24, 1839 Corinna, Maine, U.S.
- Died: February 17, 1915 (aged 75) Ashland, Wisconsin, U.S.
- Resting place: Mount Hope Cemetery; Ashland, Wisconsin
- Party: Republican
- Spouses: Stella Grimes; (died 1913)
- Children: Lillian (Payne); (b. 1868; died 1956)

Samuel S. Fifield (June 24, 1839 – February 17, 1915) was a Wisconsin politician and influential businessperson. The Town of Fifield in Price County, Wisconsin is named after him.

== Biography ==
He was born in Corinna, Maine, in 1839 and received an education as a printer. He moved to Wisconsin in 1854, where he worked as a clerk on a steamboat on the St. Croix River. He founded the Polk County Press in 1861.

After the American Civil War, he entered politics and served as a Sergeant-at-Arms for the Wisconsin State Assembly in 1871 and 1872. He later served as a Republican member of the Assembly from 1874 through 1876, serving as speaker the last year. He was elected to the Wisconsin State Senate in 1876, to fill the vacancy caused by the resignation of Henry D. Barron. He served in the state senate until 1881, at which time he was elected as Wisconsin's 14th Lieutenant Governor.

He lived in Ashland from 1872, and helped found the Ashland Press newspaper. He was the chairman of the first board of supervisors in June 1872.

After retiring from politics in 1887, he served as postmaster in Ashland, and opened a summer resort on Sand Island in Lake Superior. Named Camp Stella, after Fifield's wife, the camp was one of the first successful resorts in northern Wisconsin. The site is now within the boundaries of the Apostle Islands National Lakeshore; many of the buildings are still standing, and one, the Sevona Memorial Cottage, is listed on the National Register of Historic Places.

Fifield died in 1915 at his home in Ashland. In Ashland, there is a street of historic homes named Fifield Row in his honor.

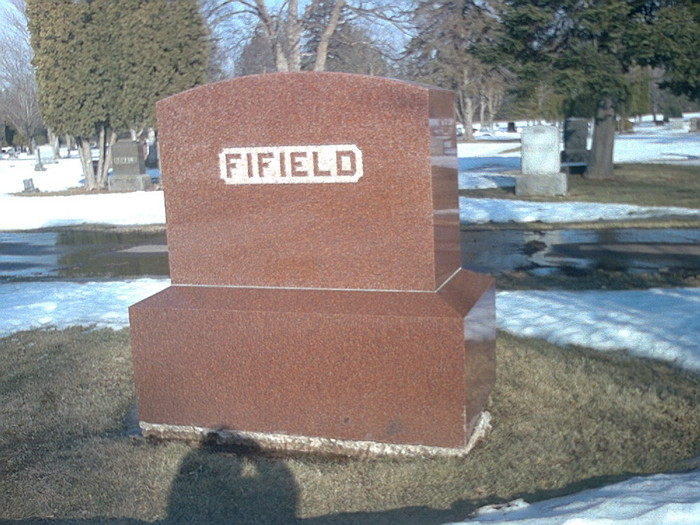
Sam Fifield is buried next to his wife, Stella, at Mount Hope Cemetery in Ashland.

Wisconsin Senate
Preceded by Henry D. Barron	Member of the Wisconsin Senate from the 24th district 1877 – 1878	Succeeded by Dana Reed Bailey
Preceded by Dana Reed Bailey	Member of the Wisconsin Senate from the 24th district 1880 – 1882	Succeeded by James Hill
Political offices
Preceded by Frederick W. Horn	Speaker of the Wisconsin State Assembly; 1876 – 1877	Succeeded by John B. Cassoday
Preceded by James M. Bingham	Lieutenant Governor of Wisconsin; 1882 – 1887	Succeeded by George W. Ryland
