= Sevona =

Steel-hulled lake freighter that sank in Lake Superior

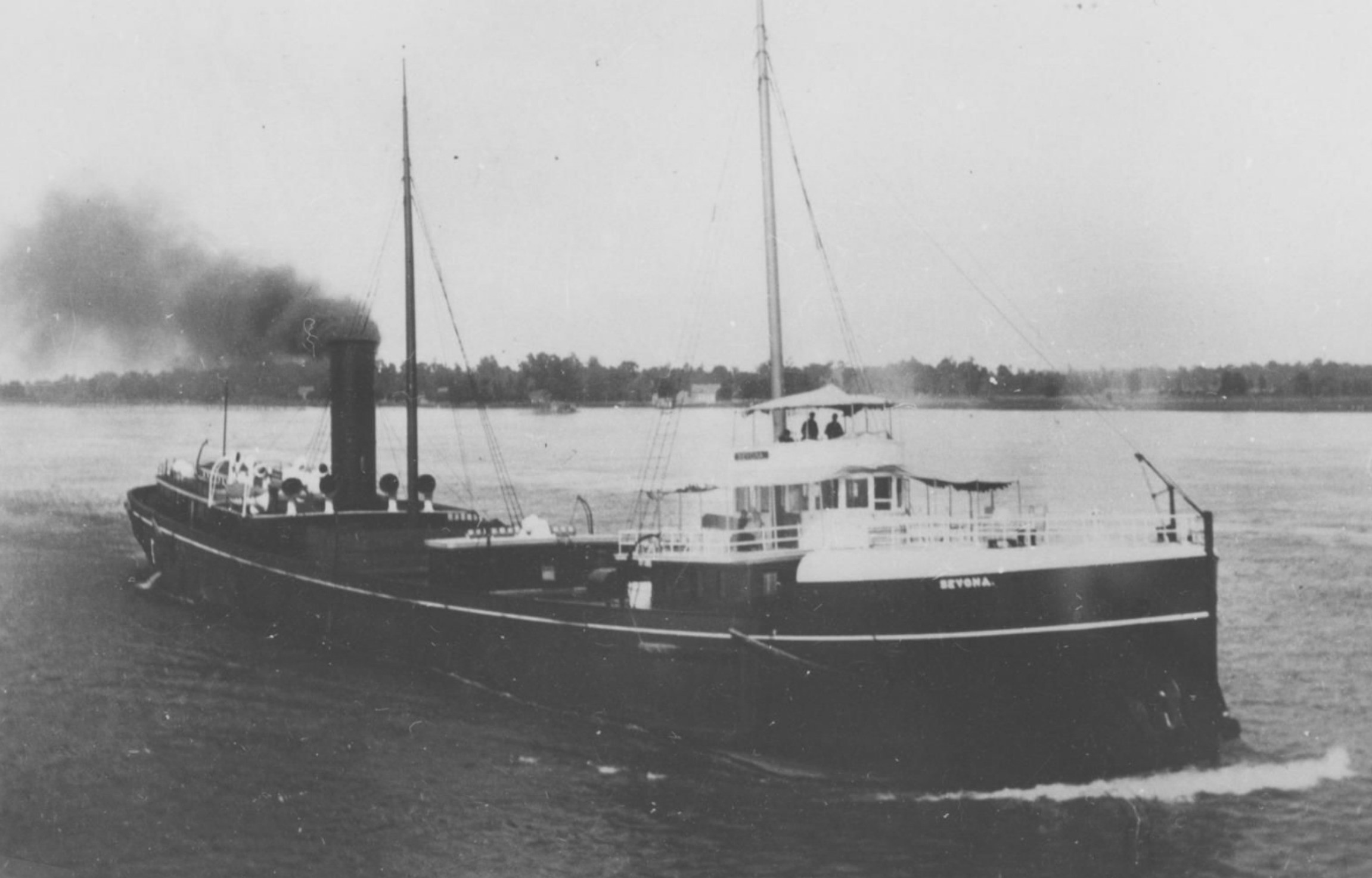
- Sevona was a relatively large ship.

History

United States
- Name: Emily P. Weed 1890-1897; Sevona 1897-1905
- Owner: James McBrier, and Donald Sutherland McDonald (second owners)
- Operator: Captain Donald Sutherland McDonald
- Port of registry: United States
- Builder: Built in 1890 at West Bay City, Michigan
- Launched: 1890
- Fate: Sank September 2, 1905
- Status: Added to the National Register of Historic Places in 1991
- Notes: Location: 47°00.410′N 90°54.520′W

General characteristics
- Type: Lake freighter
- Tonnage: 728 gross tons
- Length: Originally 300 feet (91 m), later extended to 373 feet (114 m)
- Beam: 41 feet
- Depth of hold: 21 feet
- Capacity: 3,166 tons (gross), 2,258 tons (net)
- Notes: The ship contained the first electric searchlight ever used on America's inland lakes.

Sevona was a steel-hulled lake freighter that sank in Lake Superior off the coast of Sand Island in Bayfield County, Wisconsin, United States. The wreckage site was added to the National Register of Historic Places in 1993.

== History ==
Sevona, originally named Emily P. Weed, was launched in 1890. She was renamed Sevona in 1897.

On September 1, 1905, Sevona left Allouez, Wisconsin, bound for Erie, Pennsylvania, with a cargo of iron ore and a crew of twenty men and four women. Later that night, an unexpected storm hit the area. By midnight, the wind had reached gale-force strength. At around 6:00 a.m. on September 2, Sevona ran aground on a shoal and broke in half. No other vessel was in the area to aid Sevona, so crew members on the stern section of the ship boarded the lifeboats. Crew members on the bow section, separated from the lifeboats, were forced to construct a raft out of hatch covers and doors. All crew members on the makeshift raft later lost their lives in the storm. Three other vessels, including the schooner-barge Pretoria, were lost in the storm.

In 1909, the United States Army Corps of Engineers, who were concerned about navigation hazards posed by the wreck of Sevona, blew it up with dynamite. Several parts of the ship were recovered and brought to shore following the explosion, but what was left became a popular site for scuba diving. The wreck site is managed jointly by the Wisconsin Historical Society, the Apostle Islands National Lakeshore, and the Wisconsin Department of Natural Resources.

Sam Fifield, a former Lieutenant governor of Wisconsin, had a summer resort on Sand Island, and salvaged some of the wreckage of Sevona. With this material, he built a house on Sand Island, and named it the Sevona Memorial Cottage. The house still stands today, and has undergone some preservation work over the years.

== See also ==
- Apostle Islands
- List of shipwrecks in the Great Lakes
