= Chequamegon Point Light =

Lighthouse in Wisconsin, United States

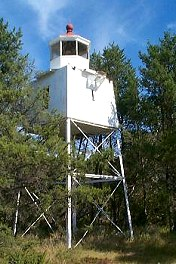
- Location: Long Island, Wisconsin
- Coordinates: 46°43′42.55″N 90°48′33.38″W

Tower
- Constructed: 1897
- Foundation: Originally on a concrete pier
- Construction: Steel
- Automated: 1964
- Height: 42 feet (13 m)
- Shape: White skeletal

Light
- First lit: 1897
- Focal height: 42 feet (13 m)
- Lens: Fourth order Fresnel lens
- Range: 7 nautical miles (13 km; 8.1 mi)
- Characteristic: Fl G 4s

The Chequamegon Point Light is a lighthouse located at the western tip of Long Island, within the Apostle Islands National Lakeshore, in Ashland County, Wisconsin. Built in 1897, the tower served to guide ships into Chequamegon Bay, toward the harbors of Ashland and Washburn, Wisconsin. The point of land where the tower sits has been subject to problems with erosion throughout the tower’s existence, and in 2026, the National Park Service announced plans to dismantle the structure.

The lighthouse consists of a 42-foot skeletal steel tower standing on a concrete base, supporting an enclosed watch room and surmounted by an octagonal lantern. As originally built, the tower was equipped with a fourth order Fresnel lens and a mechanical fog bell.

== History ==
The Chequamegon Point tower was built as part of a major upgrade to the original La Pointe light station on Long Island, a measure brought on by shifting patterns of maritime traffic in the area.

The first lighthouse on Long Island, built in 1858, was located about eight-tenths of a mile from the western tip of the island. It was established for the purpose of guiding ships toward the harbor at La Pointe, on the west, or hidden, side of Madeline Island, the primary settlement on western Lake Superior at the time. As a result, the beacon was given the name "La Pointe Lighthouse," despite the fact that it sat on a different island than its namesake port. However, in the decades that followed, new towns sprang up in the Chequamegon region, and the old fur trade settlement at La Pointe receded in significance. In the latter decades of the nineteenth century, traffic at the Ashland harbor increased substantially with the opening of mines in the Gogebic Range on Michigan's Upper Peninsula. Calls for a light to mark the entrance to Chequamegon Bay began as early as 1874.

In 1895, Congress appropriated funds for major improvements to the La Pointe light station. The project included replacement of the old wooden lighthouse with a taller steel tower, construction of an additional tower at Chequamegon Point, and conversion of the original lighthouse into housing for keepers. The keepers of the La Pointe station would be responsible for tending both beacons, and an additional assistant keeper position was added to the light station staff.

Construction at the site began in summer 1896, but was forced to halt in October that year when the appropriated funds ran out before completion. Congress appropriated additional funds the following year, and construction resumed in August 1897. On October 11, 1897, a Lighthouse Service technician removed the Fresnel lens from the 1858 lighthouse and installed it in the new Chequamegon Point tower, then lit the lamp for the first time at the new site. Along with the lamp, the tower was equipped with a mechanically operated bell, to be used when fog obscured the view of the light. The bell is now on exhibit at the Madeline Island Museum on Madeline Island.

Tending the beacon required keepers to walk more than a mile from the main La Pointe light to Chequamegon Point several times a day. In 1909, the Lighthouse Service installed a concrete sidewalk between the two sites, so the keepers would no longer have to trudge through the sand. In 1937, an electric light replaced the original oil lamp, further lessening the workload on the lightkeepers. Two years later, the U.S. Coast Guard absorbed the Lighthouse Service, and as time went by, enlisted Coast Guard personnel replaced the civilian keepers. The station was automated in 1964, and all Coast Guard personnel were removed from the island.

In 1986 Long Island was added to the Apostle Islands National Lakeshore, and ownership of the light station, including both towers, transferred from the U.S. Coast Guard to the National Park Service. However, the terms of the arrangement allowed the Coast Guard to retain control of the actual beacon.

== Erosion problems ==
Erected at the tip of a shifting sand bar, exposed to the waves of Lake Superior, the Chequamegon Point tower encountered the effects of erosion from the very beginning. By 1911, when the tower was only fourteen years old, the Lighthouse Service found the problem serious enough to surround the site with log cribs filled with stone. Although issues of erosion continued over the years, the matter came to a climax in 1987, when the Coast Guard decided the best course of action was relocate the navigational beacon to a modern "D9" tower and move the historic tower inland. On June 8 of that year, the agency brought in one of their largest helicopters, attached cables to the tower, and attempted to lift the structure and move it inland.

The effort failed. Instead of lifting the tower, the helicopter merely dragged it along the ground about 100 feet, then let it drop. Damage to the structure was significant.

Nineteen years later, in 2006, the National Park Service finally received funding to repair the damage this episode caused. New concrete footings were put in place as part of the project, but even so, erosion continued to have serious adverse effects on the site. On May 20, 2026, the National Park Service announced that, after consultation with the Wisconsin State Historic Preservation Officer and the federal Advisory Council on Historic Preservation, it would dismantle the tower later that summer.
