= Minnesota Boat Club Boathouse on Raspberry Island =

- U.S. National Register of Historic Places
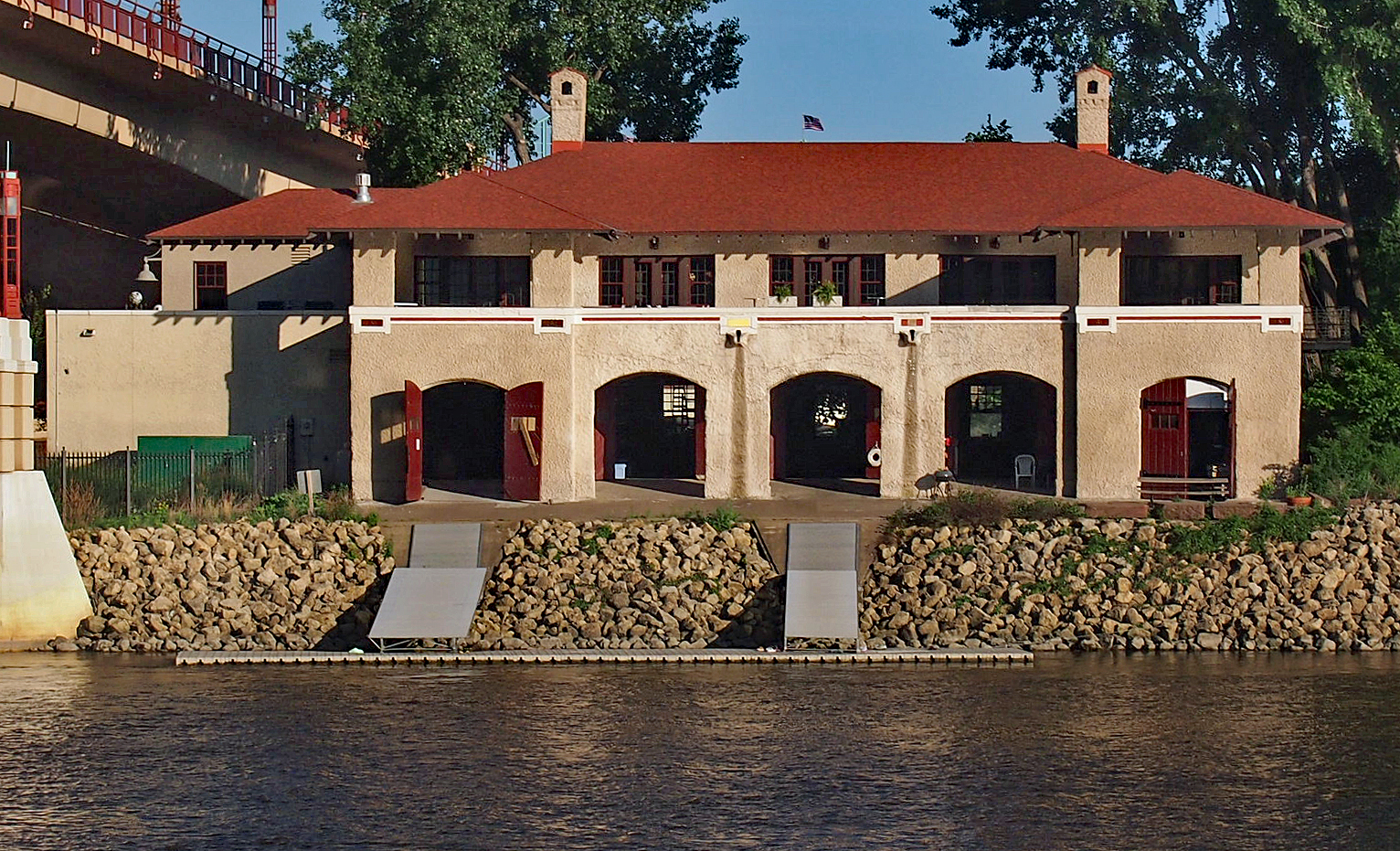
- The Minnesota Boat Club Boathouse from the northwest

- Location within Minnesota Location within the United States
- Location: 1 Wabasha Street South; Saint Paul, Minnesota
- Coordinates: 44°56′31″N 93°5′29″W
- Built: 1910
- Architect: H.G. Carlsey; George J. Grant Construction Co.
- Architectural style: Mission/Spanish Revival
- NRHP reference No.: 82004627
- Added to NRHP: February 4, 1982

The Minnesota Boat Club Boathouse on Raspberry Island is a historic structure in Saint Paul, Minnesota, United States. It is the home of the Minnesota Boat Club, a rowing club founded in 1870, that is Minnesota's oldest athletic organization. In 1885, a wooden structure was built on Raspberry Island to house the Minnesota Boat Club. The club constructed a new boathouse in 1910, which was designed by George H. Carsley in the style of Mission Revival architecture. The boathouse building was listed on the National Register of Historic Places in 1982.

== See also ==
- History of Saint Paul, Minnesota
- Mississippi National River and Recreation Area
- Upper Mississippi River
- Wabasha Street Bridge
