= La Pointe Light =

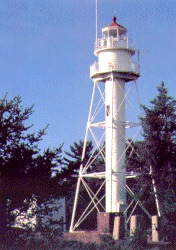
- Location: Long Island, Wisconsin
- Coordinates: 46°43′43.2″N 90°47′6.4″W

Tower
- Constructed: 1896
- Foundation: Concrete
- Construction: Cast iron
- Automated: 1964
- Height: 65 feet (20 m)
- Shape: White, Skeletal with a central column
- Heritage: National Register of Historic Places listed place

Light
- First lit: 1896
- Focal height: 70 feet (21 m)
- Lens: Fourth order Fresnel lens (original), 12-inch (300 mm)Tideland Signal ML-300 Acrylic Optic (current)
- Range: 8 nautical miles (15 km; 9.2 mi)
- Characteristic: Green, Isophase (Equal interval), 6 sec
- La Pointe Light Station
- U.S. National Register of Historic Places
- Nearest city: Bayfield, Wisconsin
- Area: 2 acres (0.81 ha)
- MPS: U.S. Coast Guard Lighthouses and Light Stations on the Great Lakes TR
- NRHP reference No.: 83003366
- Added to NRHP: August 04, 1983

The La Pointe Light is a lighthouse located on Long Island, one of the Apostle Islands, in Lake Superior in Ashland County, Wisconsin, near the city of Bayfield.

Currently owned by the National Park Service and part of the Apostle Islands National Lakeshore, it was added to the National Register of Historic Places in 1983, as reference number 83003366. Listed in the Library of Congress, Historic American Buildings Survey, WI-325 and WI-325-A. One of the oldest skeletal lighthouses on the Great Lakes, it played an important role in transportation on Lake Superior.

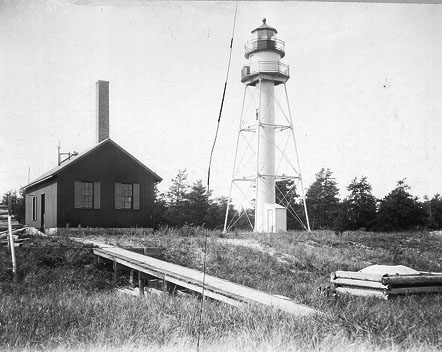
USCG archive photo

A square wooden tower, constructed in 1858, was located around 3,000 feet (910 m) west of the current light. The previous lens was moved to the Chequamegon Point Lighthouse in 1897. It is one of the Apostle Islands Lighthouses.

== Getting there ==
Most of the Apostle Islands light stations may be reached on the Apostle Islands Cruise Service water taxi or by private boat during the summer.
