= Sevona Cabin =

Historic house in Wisconsin, United States

- U.S. National Register of Historic Places
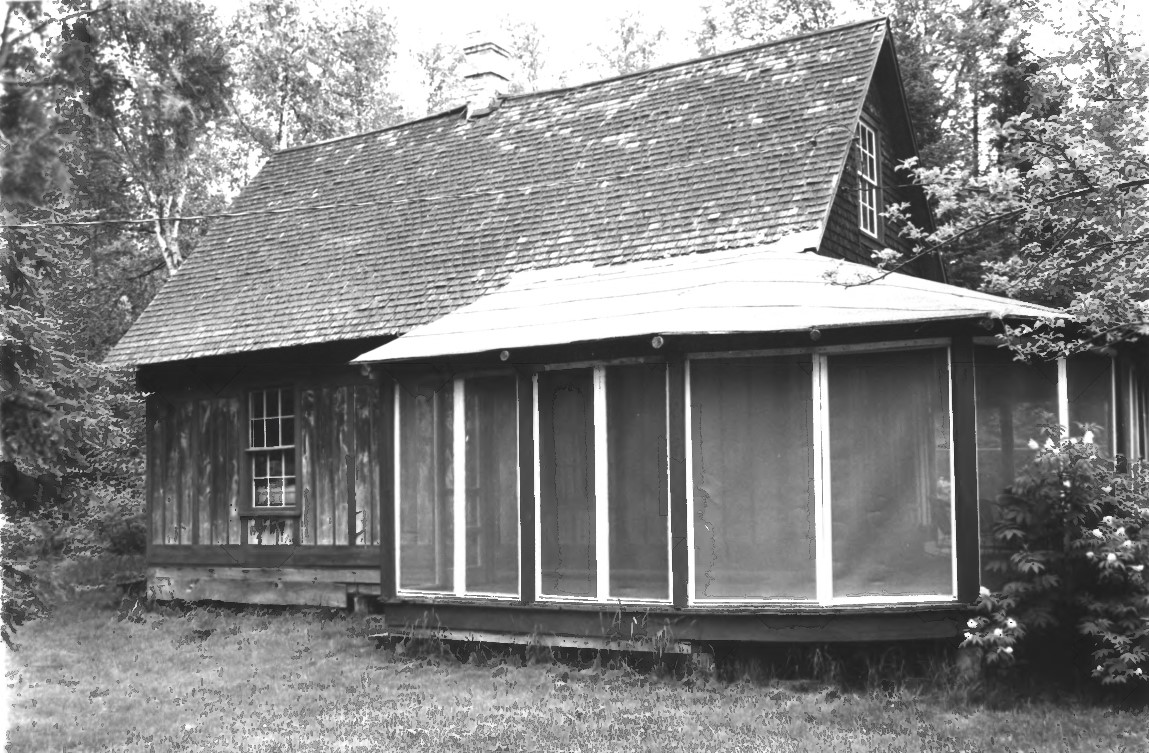
- Location: Sand Island
- Nearest city: Bayfield, Wisconsin
- Coordinates: 46°57′49″N 90°56′14″W
- Area: less than one acre
- Built: 1905
- Architect: Sam Fifield
- Architectural style: Gablefront
- NRHP reference No.: 76000051
- Added to NRHP: September 29, 1976

The Sevona Cabin is located on Sand Island of the Apostle Islands National Lakeshore.

== History ==
Also known as the Sevona Memorial Cottage, the cabin was built in part with salvaged wreckage of the Sevona in 1905. It was constructed by former Lieutenant Governor of Wisconsin Sam Fifield. The cabin was added to the National Register of Historic Places in 1976 and to the Wisconsin State Register of Historic Places in 1989.
