= Raspberry Island (Minnesota) =

Island in the Mississippi River in Saint Paul, Minnesota

Nickname: Navy Island
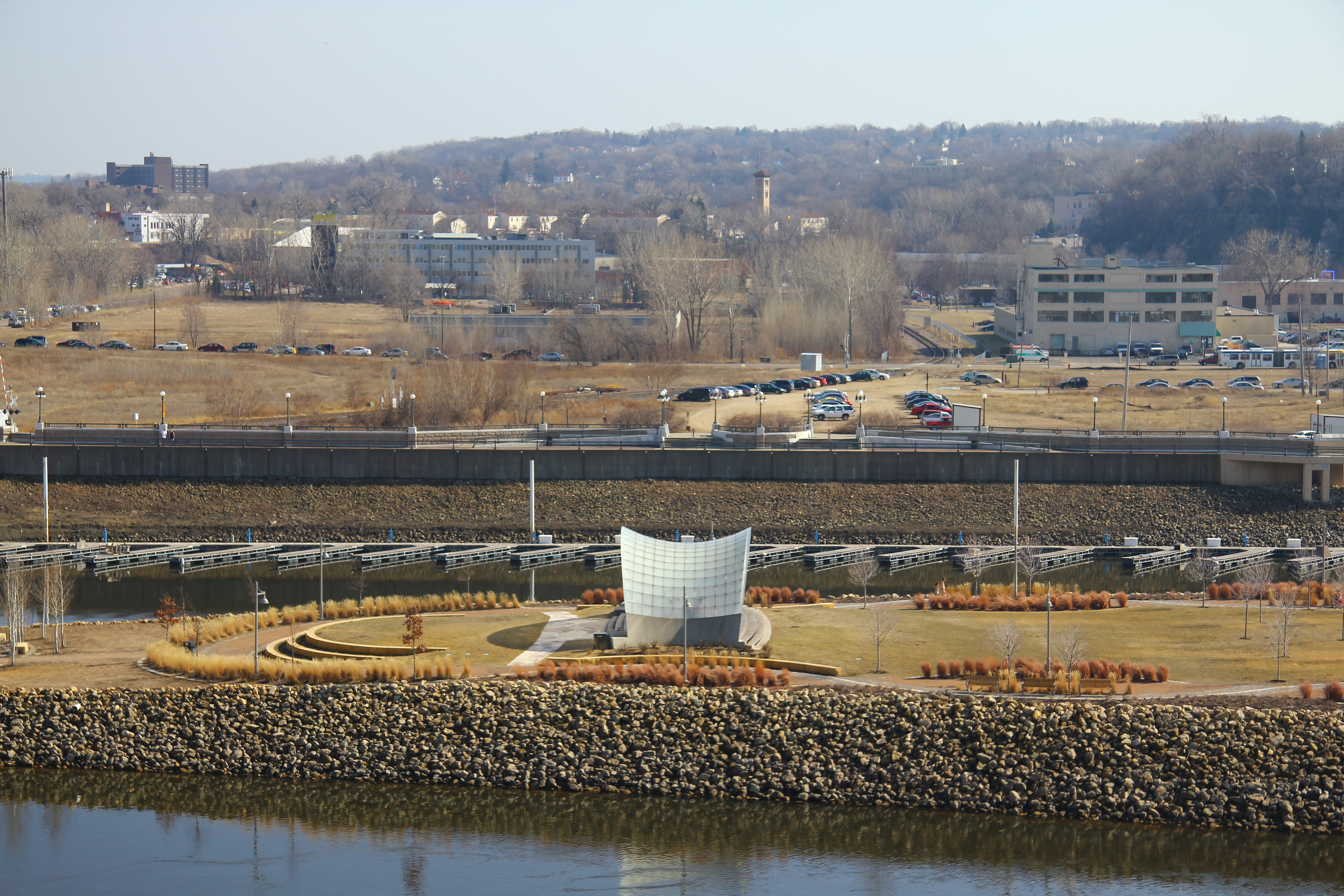
- The east side of Raspberry Island in 2012
- Interactive map of Raspberry Island
- Etymology: Indigenous wild raspberries

Geography
- Coordinates: 44.9421879°N 93.0904963°W
- Adjacent to: Mississippi River
- Area: 87,120 sq ft (8,094 m^{2})
- Highest elevation: 696 ft (212.1 m)

Administration
- United States
- State: Minnesota
- City: Saint Paul

Raspberry Island (formerly called Navy Island) is located in the Mississippi River in Saint Paul, Minnesota, United States. Buildings for the Minnesota Boat Club have sat upon the island since 1885; the Minnesota Boat Club Boathouse structure was built in 1910. Between 1949 and 1968, the island was used by the United States Navy. The City of Saint Paul manages the island as part of the Harriet Island Regional Park. Paths, a plaza, and a bandshell were installed on Raspberry Island during renovations by the city in the early 2000s.

== Geographic features ==
Raspberry Island is located in the Mississippi River under the Wabasha Street Bridge. It has a total area of 2 acres (8,094 m^{2}) and sits at an elevation of 696 feet (212 m) above sea level. The Raspberry Island Bridge connects it to the mainland.

== History ==
Raspberry Island was originally named for the wild raspberries that grew on it, with the name appearing on the first map of downtown Saint Paul in 1851.

In 1885, a wooden structure was built to house the Minnesota Boat Club, the oldest athletic club in the state. The club constructed a new home in 1910, the Minnesota Boat Club Boathouse, designed by George H. Carsley in the style of Mission Revival architecture.

The name Raspberry Island remained until 1949, when the United States Navy built a small base on the eastern side of the island—the west side was owned by the Minnesota Boat Club—and it subsequently became known as Navy Island. Flooding in 1965 washed the 150-foot (46 m) wooden bridge connecting the island to the mainland from its moorings and away downstream. The Navy departed from the island in 1968.

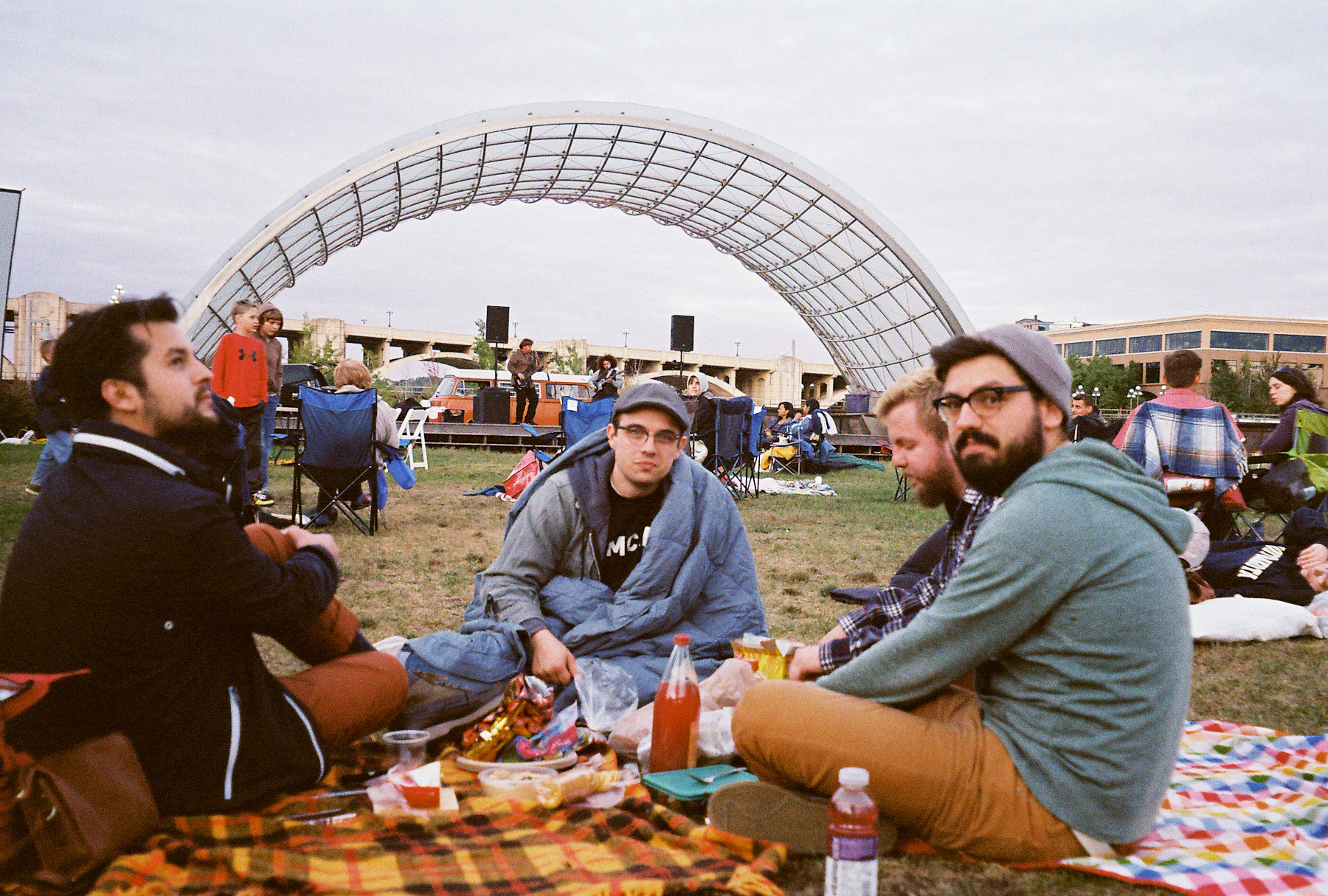
Picnickers sitting by the new bandshell added during Raspberry Island's renovation, 2012

Many downtown Saint Paul employees used the island as an unofficial parking lot during the 1970s and 1980s. A 1995 Saint Paul City Council resolution changed the name back to Raspberry Island.

Log jams were recorded near the bridge that connects the island to the mainland in 2010 and again in 2013. These caused trouble for local boaters whose docking space was diminished by the presence of the logs. The City of Saint Paul funded removal of the logs in both instances.

By the early 2000s, the island was described as a "rather scruffy, barren place". The City of Saint Paul renovated structures and added amenities in 2007–2008. The shoreline was strengthened with limestone riprap; public restrooms were added to the Minnesota Boat Club building; a plaza, trails, and an event lawn were constructed near a new bandshell designed for Saint Paul's Schubert Club; and 131 trees and numerous other shrubs, grasses, and flowers were planted. The total project cost $5 million.

== Media coverage ==
Local WCCO-TV named the island's boat club one of Minnesota's best places at which to hold a wedding reception, noting that "[w]hile it might be located downtown, none of the bustle or the noise of the city reaches the island".

== See also ==
- History of Saint Paul, Minnesota
- Mississippi National River and Recreation Area
- Upper Mississippi River
