= Outer Island (Wisconsin) =

Island in Wisconsin, United States

Coordinates: 47°02′07″N 090°25′52″W

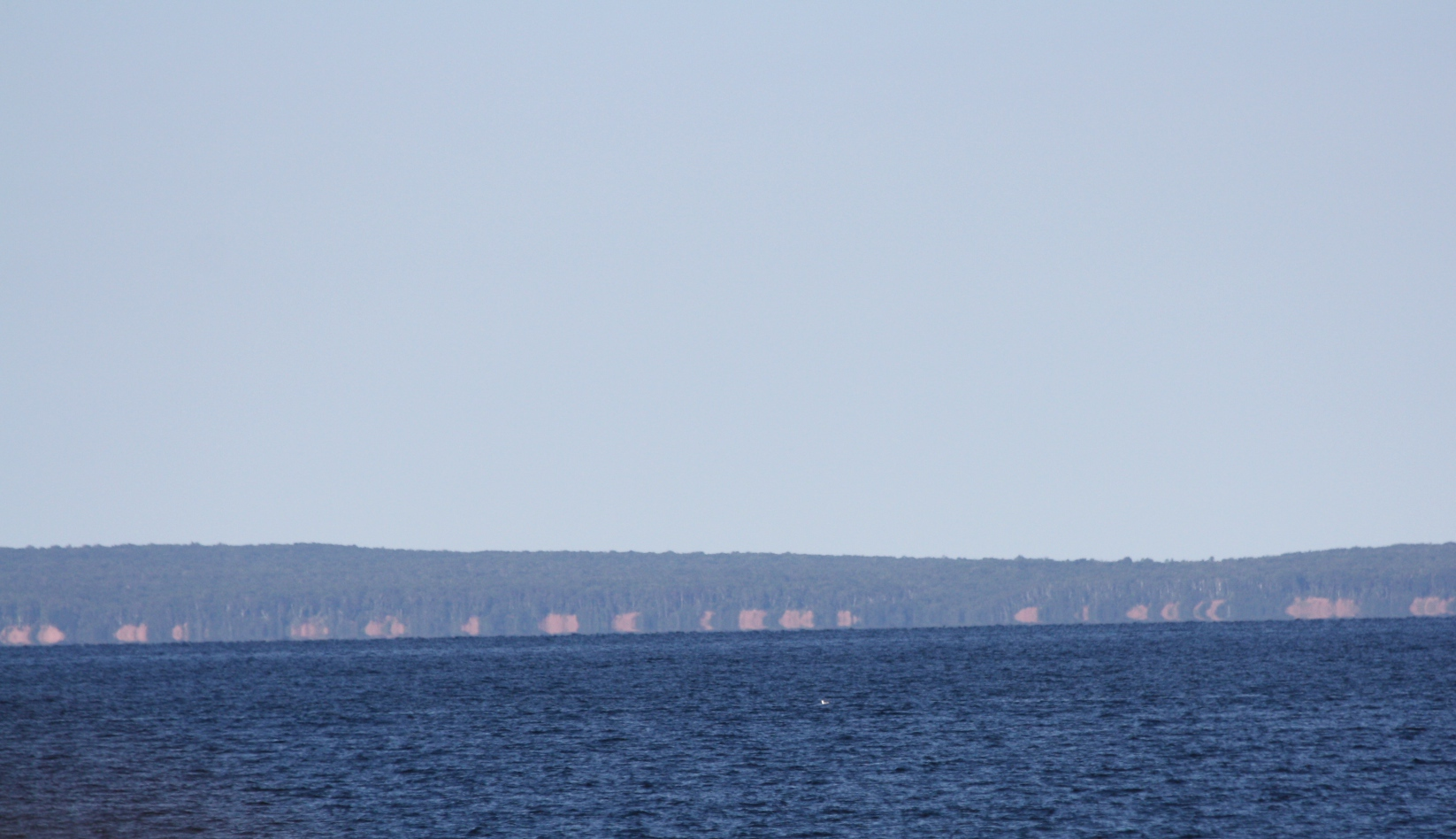
Outer Island

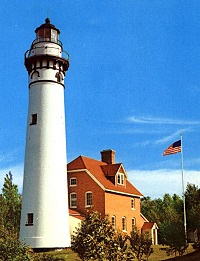
Outer Island Light

Outer Island is one of the Apostle Islands, in Lake Superior, in northern Wisconsin, and is part of the Apostle Islands National Lakeshore. It is the easternmost, and third largest of the Apostle Islands. The Outer Island Light is on the northern part of the island. The island is part of the Town of La Pointe, Wisconsin.

The island has a rich history dating back to its logging days in the late 19th century. The remnants of the Lullabye Furniture camp are located on the north east end of the island. The camp includes 7 trucks leftover and many dangerous buildings. There once was a railroad tram system that cut 7 miles through the island from the southern sand-spit up to the camp.

Today there is a dock on the north end which National Park Service and recreational vessels use to tie up. The dock is a concrete L pier which was left behind from when the Coast Guard's Lighthouse Service used the dock. From the dock there are two trails. One leads to the Lullabye Furniture camp, and the other is a 7-mile hike to the sandspit on the southern end. The trail to the sandspit follows the old railroad bed that was used 100 years ago.
