= Wabasha Street Bridge =

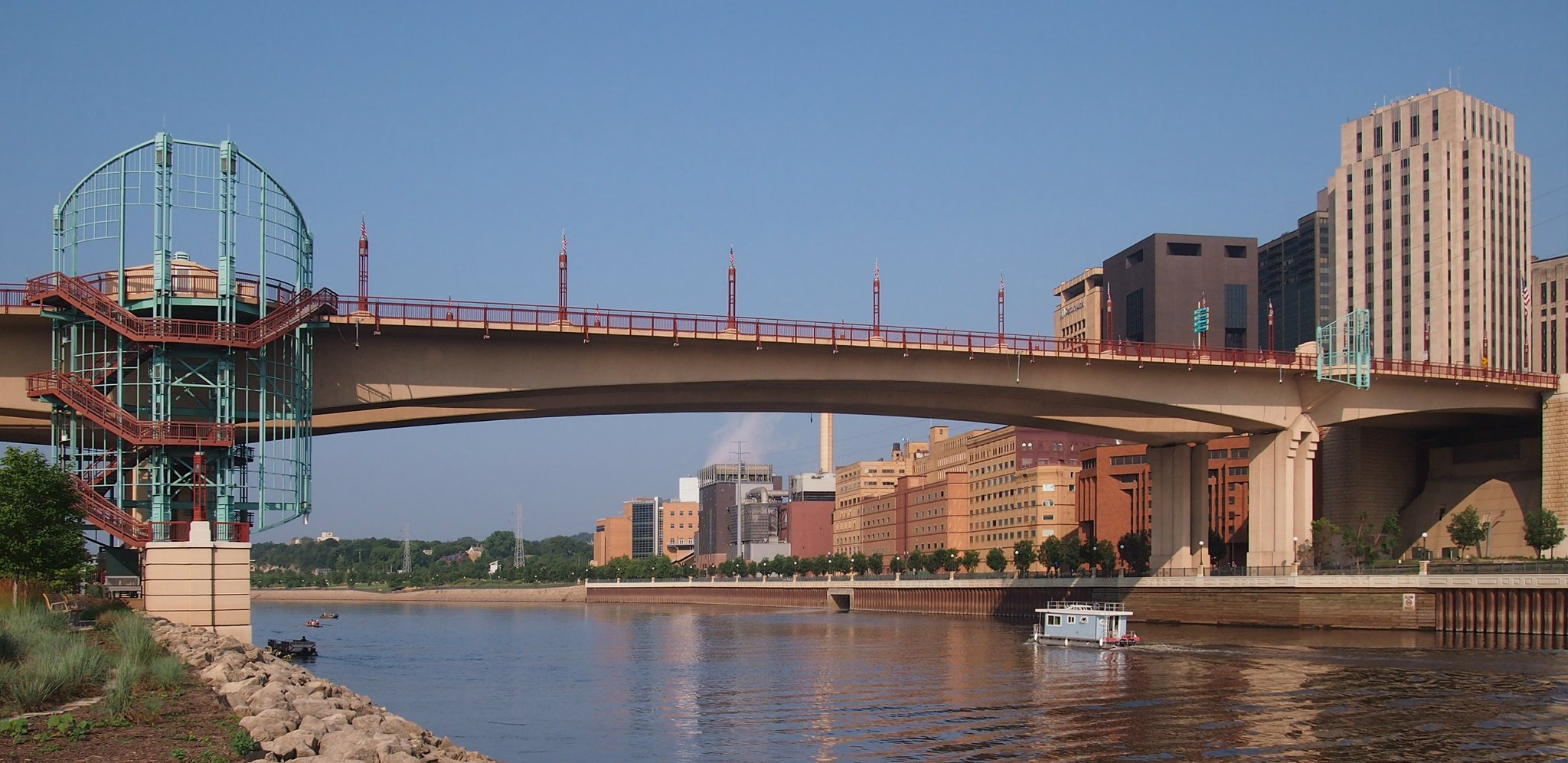
- Northern spans of the Wabasha Street Bridge from Raspberry Island
- Coordinates: 44°56′31″N 93°05′28″W
- Carries: 4 lanes of Wabasha Street
- Crosses: Mississippi River
- Locale: Saint Paul, Minnesota
- Maintained by: City of Saint Paul

Characteristics
- Design: Concrete segmental box girder
- Total length: 1,253 feet (382 m)
- Width: 104 feet (32 m)
- Longest span: 397 feet (121 m)

History
- Opened: July 1998

Location
- Interactive map of Wabasha Street Bridge

The Wabasha Street Bridge is a segmental bridge that spans the Mississippi River in downtown Saint Paul, Minnesota, United States. It was named Wabasha Street Freedom Bridge in 2002, to commemorate the first anniversary of the September 11 attacks. It actually consists of two separate bridges, one for northbound and one for southbound traffic. The use of a concrete segmental box girder bridge provided a construction advantage because no falsework needed to be built beneath the bridge.

The bridge opened to traffic in 1998; some decorative elements were not completed until late 2001. It was built by Lunda Construction Company and was designed by Toltz, King, Duvall, Anderson & Associates, Inc.

The new bridge replaced an earlier structure that was built in 1889.

The new bridge was built with pedestrians in mind. It features 11-foot-wide (3.4 m) sidewalks, six overlooks at the pier locations, and a stairway down to Raspberry Island. The color scheme of the bridge was also planned to reflect the architectural heritage of Saint Paul, with a soft buff color (the color of sandstone) to reflect the colors used in many downtown Saint Paul buildings. The color of terracotta roofs in the city was used to select the color of the railings, and the green patina of the Saint Paul Cathedral is echoed in the ornamental color of the overlooks.

The new bridge has won several awards, including the Federal Highway Administration 1998 Excellence in Highway Design Award and the Minnesota Society of Professional Engineers 2001 Seven Wonders of Engineering in Minnesota award.

The pedestrian walkways are on the outside of the bridge. There is a gap of 8.7 feet (2.7 m) between the two bridge decks, between the southbound bridge and the northbound bridge. In July 2011, a man jumped over the inner railing, on the side not designated for pedestrians, thinking a landing was on the other side. Instead, he fell 55 feet (17 m) and landed on Raspberry Island underneath the bridge. He survived the fall but was critically injured.

To mark the Minnesota Senate's vote to allow same sex marriage in Minnesota, mayor Chris Coleman issued a proclamation on May 13, 2013, temporarily renaming the bridge "Wabasha Street Freedom to Marry Bridge" and ordered dozens of rainbow flags to be flown on the bridge.

== 1886 Bridge ==
- Wabasha Street Bridge
- U.S. National Register of Historic Places
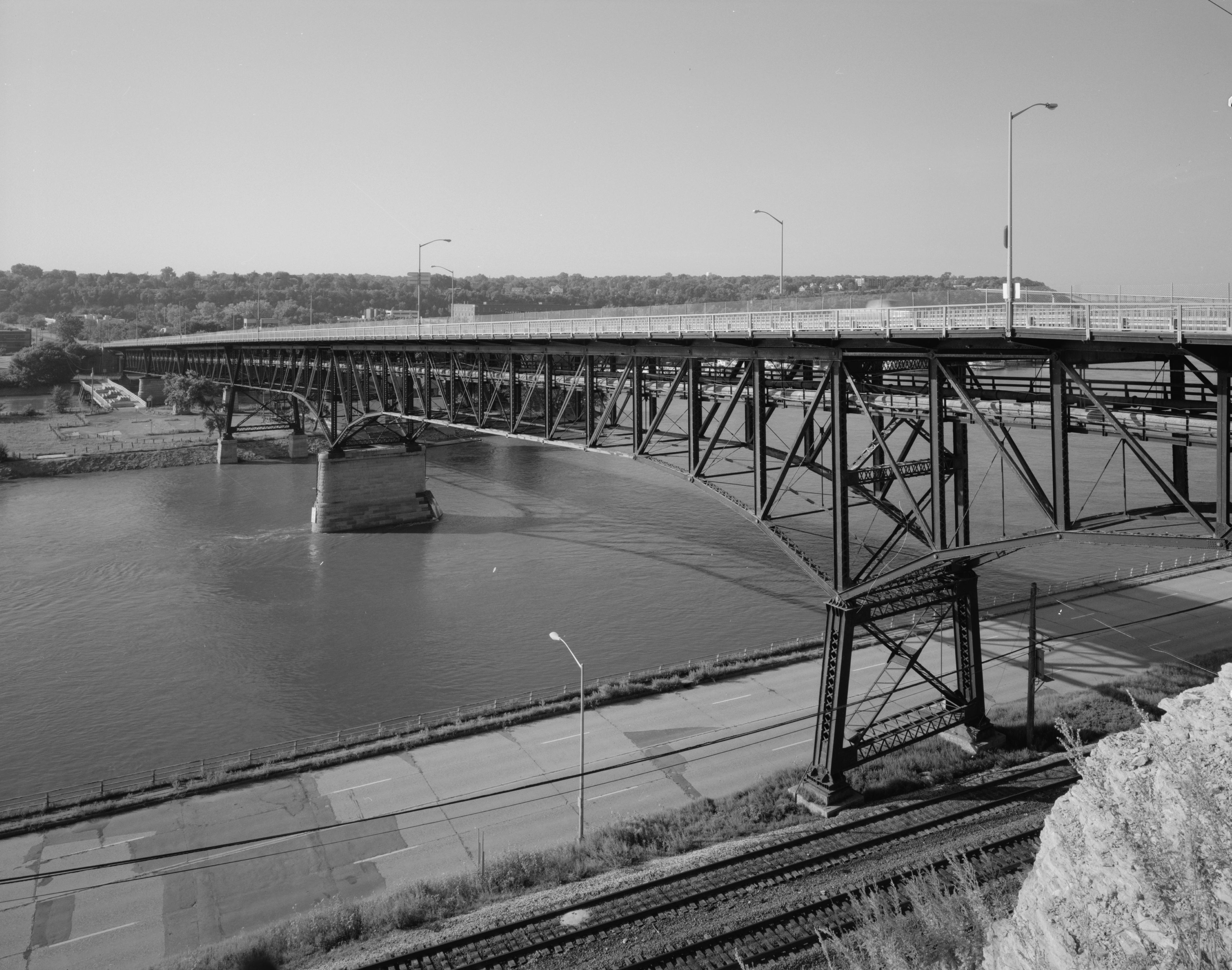
- Former Wabasha Street Bridge in 1993

- Location within Minnesota Location within the United States
- Location: Wabasha Street over Mississippi River, Saint Paul, Minnesota
- Area: less than one acre
- Built: 1890
- Architect: Multiple
- Architectural style: Cantilever deck truss
- Demolished: 1996
- MPS: Iron and Steel Bridges in Minnesota MPS
- NRHP reference No.: 89001834
- Added to NRHP: 1989

Completed in 1890, the second bridge was an iron cantilever deck-truss bridge, which was an advanced engineering feat at the time. That bridge was listed in the National Register of Historic Places in 1989. Unfortunately, that bridge had increasing problems with repair and maintenance because of its age, and after city engineers assessed the condition of the old bridge, the decision was made to replace the bridge.

== 1859 Bridge ==
The first Wabasha Street Bridge was completed in 1859 and was known as the "Saint Paul Bridge". It was a toll bridge until 1874 when West Saint Paul was annexed into Saint Paul.

== See also ==
- List of bridges documented by the Historic American Engineering Record in Minnesota
- List of crossings of the Upper Mississippi River
