= Raspberry Island (Wisconsin) =

Island in Wisconsin, United States

Coordinates: 46°58′31″N 090°47′40″W

Native name: Miskominikaani-minis
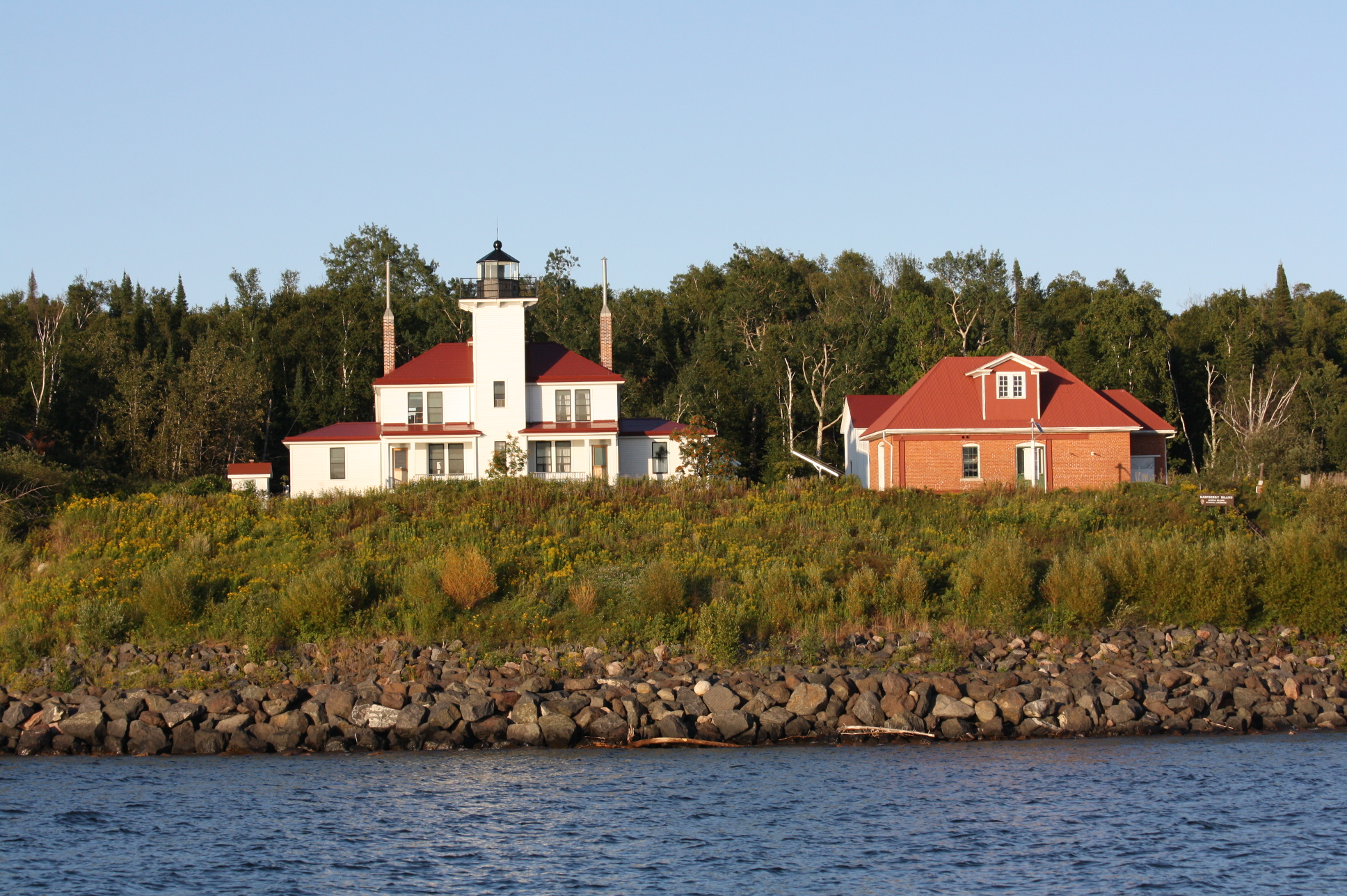
- Raspberry Island Light Station from Lake Superior
- Interactive map of Raspberry Island
- Etymology: Wild raspberries that grew on the island

Geography
- Location: Lake Superior
- Archipelago: Apostle Islands
- Area: 33.8 acres (13.7 ha)
- Length: 1 mi (2 km)
- Width: .5 mi (0.8 km)
- Highest elevation: 702 ft (214 m)

Administration
- US
- State: Wisconsin
- County: Bayfield County
- Town: Russell

Demographics
- Population: 0

Additional information
- Time zone: Central (CST) (UTC-6)
  - Summer (DST): CDT (UTC-5)
- Official website: www.nps.gov/places/raspberry-island.htm

Raspberry Island is one of the Apostle Islands in northern Wisconsin, in Lake Superior, and is part of the Apostle Islands National Lakeshore. The island is part of the Town of Russell, in Bayfield County. The Raspberry Island Light is located on the island.

An island with the same name is in Teal Lake in Sawyer County. Raspberry Island is the only island in the Apostle Islands that does not have deer. The lighthouse was remodeled in 2006 by the National Park Service and cost over one million dollars. The lighthouse used to be inhabited by a keeper, his daughter and wife and his assistant. Although the lighthouse family originally had horses, cows, and pigs, they do not anymore. There is a small historical garden near the light that is maintained by the US Boy Scouts in Bayfield. The island does not have any wild raspberries, but the family used to grow them.

== Images ==
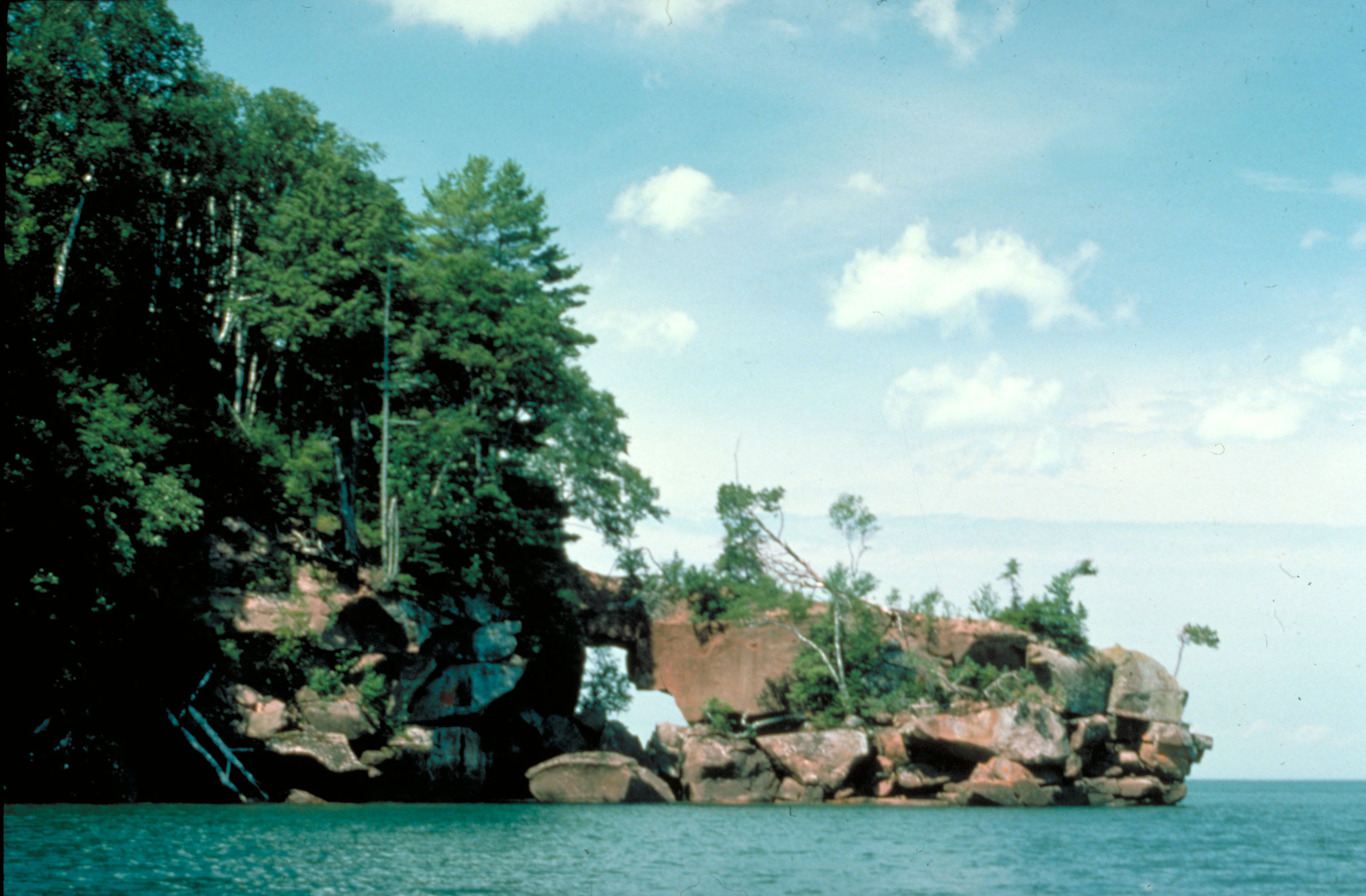
Shore

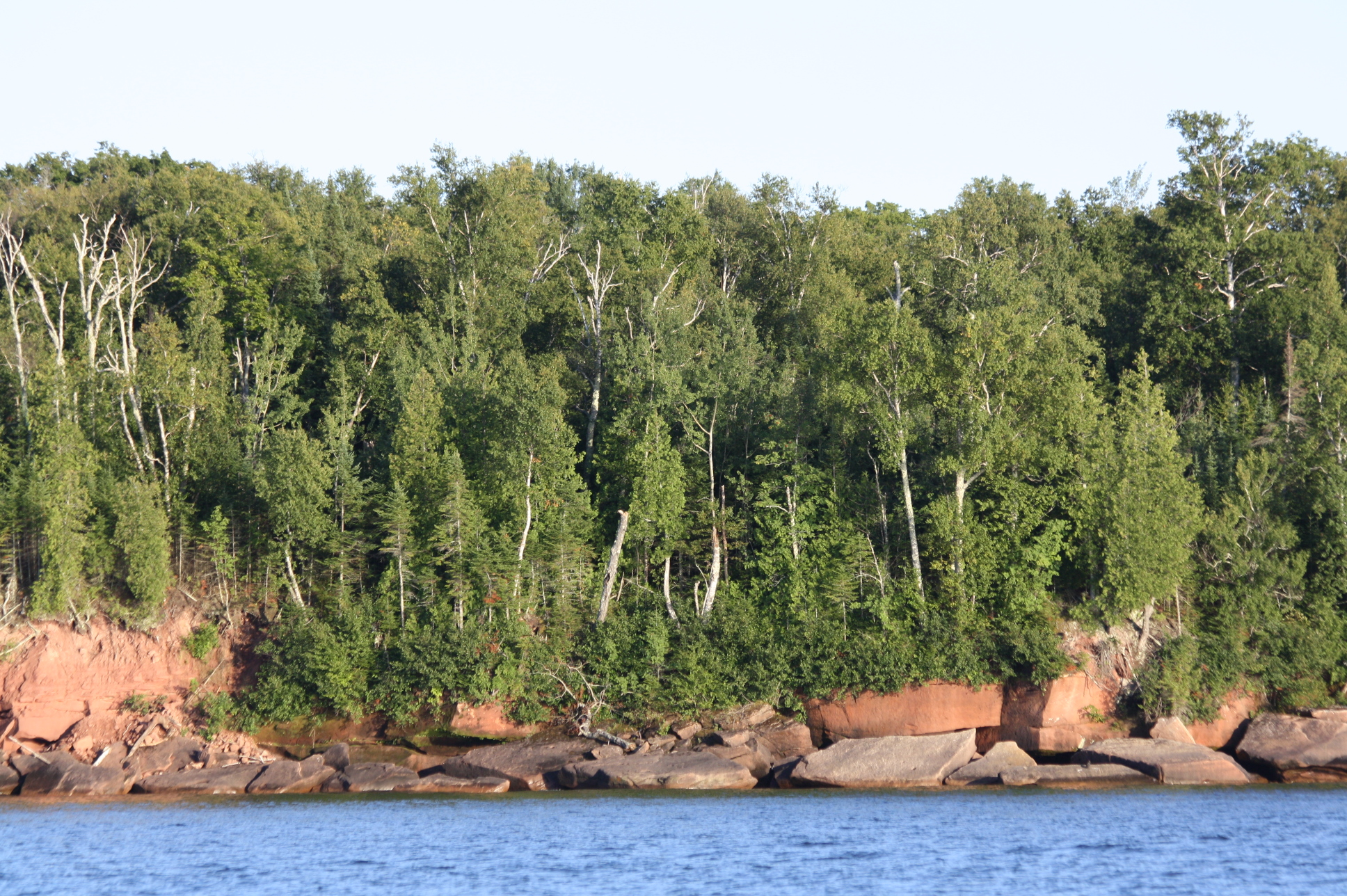
Trees lining the shore

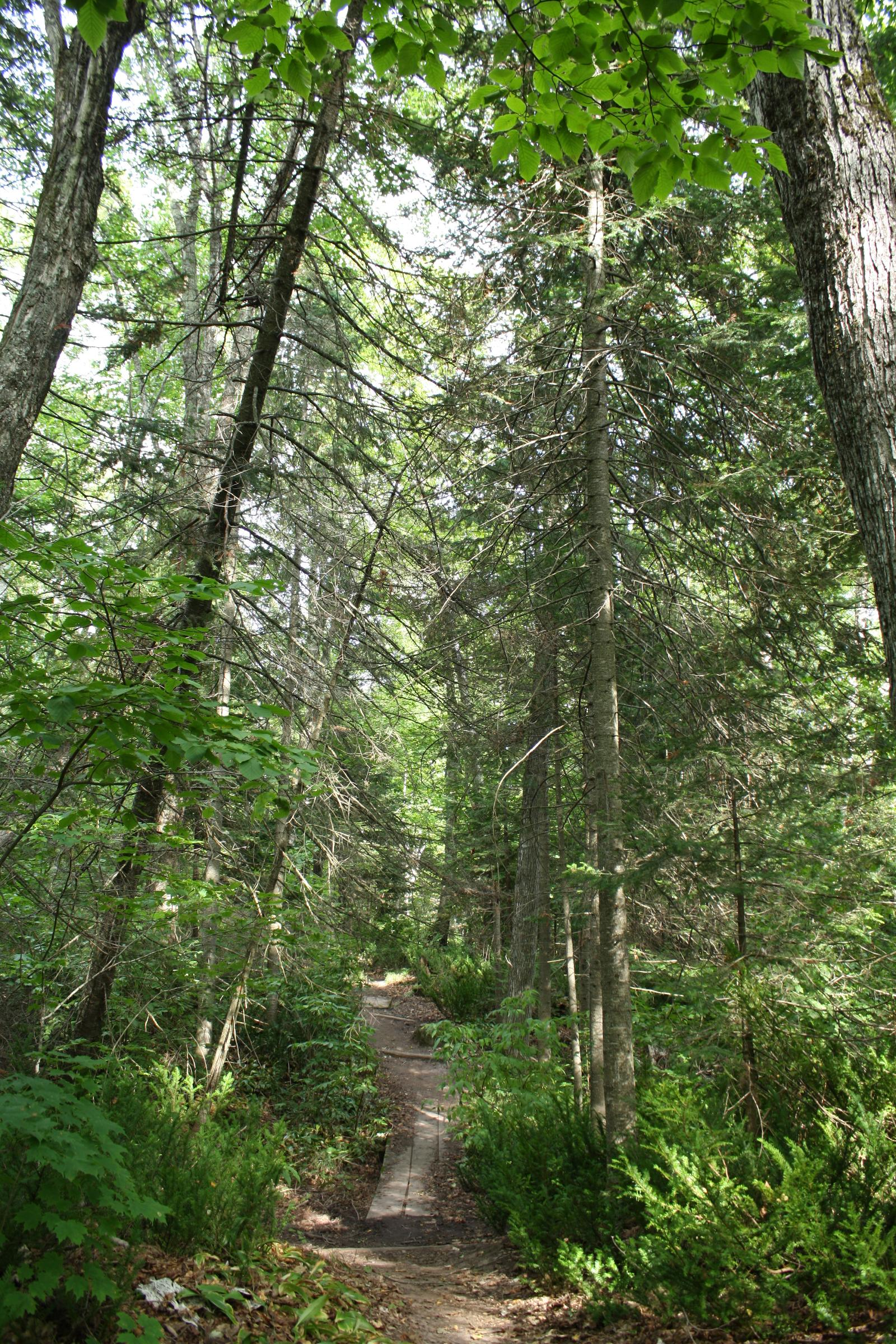
Trail on Raspberry Island
