= Dana Reed Bailey =

American politician

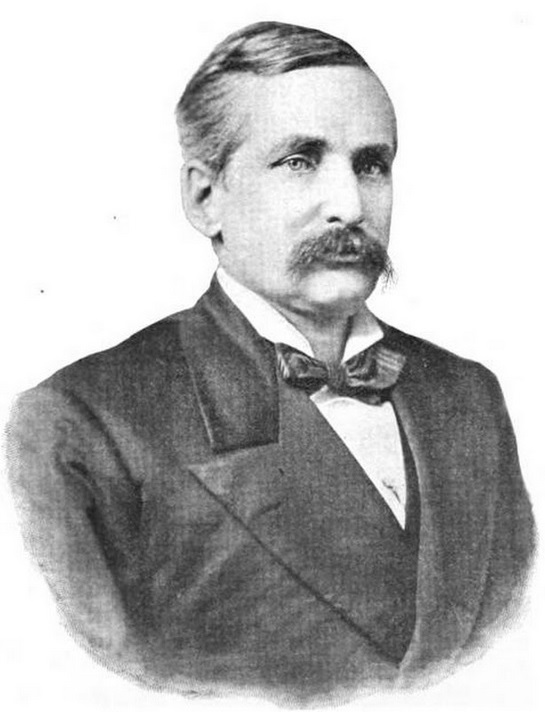
Frontispiece of 1899's History of Minnehaha County, South Dakota, by Dana R. Bailey

Dana Reed Bailey (April 27, 1833 - March 25, 1908) was a politician in Vermont, Wisconsin, and South Dakota.

== Biography ==
Bailey was born on April 27, 1833, in Montgomery, Vermont. He became a teacher, lawyer, and politician.

== Political career ==
He was elected as a delegate to the 1868 Republican National Convention. He was elected as State's Attorney of Franklin County, Vermont. From 1871 to 1874, he was a member of the Vermont Senate. After founding Baldwin, Wisconsin, Bailey was a member of the Wisconsin State Senate from 1878 to 1879. He was then Commissioner of St. Croix County, Wisconsin, from 1880 to 1882. Bailey was State's Attorney of Minnehaha County, South Dakota, from 1890 to 1895.

Bailey died in Sioux Falls, South Dakota, on March 25, 1908. He was buried at Woodlawn Cemetery in Sioux Falls.
