= Pretoria (schooner barge) =

American schooner barge that sank in Lake Superior

- Pretoria (schooner-barge) Shipwreck Site
- U.S. National Register of Historic Places
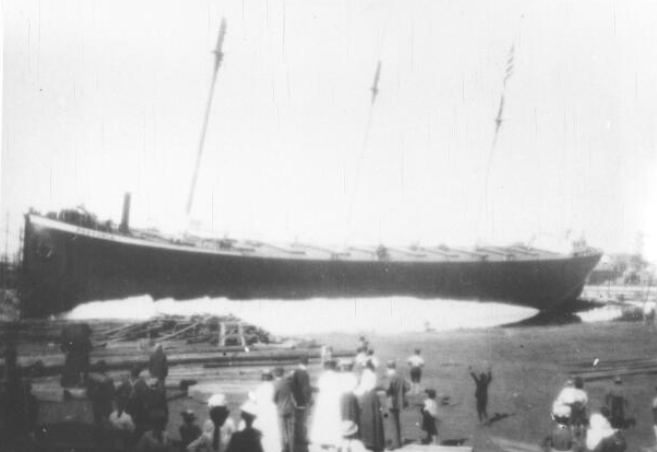
- Launching of Pretoria

- Location within Wisconsin Location within the United States
- Nearest city: Bayfield, Wisconsin
- Coordinates: 47°05.36′N 90°23.66′W
- Architect: Davidson, James
- MPS: Great Lakes Shipwreck Sites of Wisconsin MPS
- NRHP reference No.: 94000835 (original); 100011647 (increase)

Significant dates
- Added to NRHP: August 17, 1994
- Boundary increase: April 14, 2025

Pretoria, an American schooner barge, was one of the largest wooden ships ever constructed. She was 103 meters (338 ft) long, had a beam of 13.4 meters (44 ft), and 7 meters (23 ft) in depth. She was built by James Davidson in West Bay City, Michigan, for use on the Great Lakes.

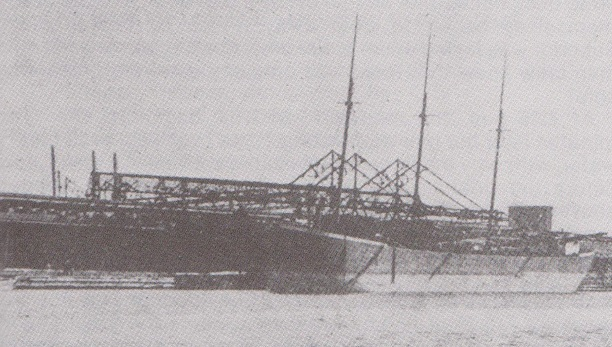
"Pretoria" at dock

To strengthen her wooden frame and hull, Pretoria was constructed using steel keelson plates, steel chords, and steel arches. She also was strapped diagonally with steel. She needed a donkey engine to run a pump to keep her interior dry.

The Saginaw, Michigan newspaper "The Courier-Herald" described "Pretoria"'s launch on July 26, 1900, in the following way:

The schooner "Pretoria, the largest wooden boat ever built, was launched at Davidson's shipyard this afternoon, in the presence of a vast multitude. The "Pretoria" will carry 5,000 tons of iron ore, 175,000 bushels of wheat, or 300,000 bushels of oats...

On 1 September 1905, Pretoria took on cargo at a pier in Superior, Wisconsin. Another notable ship, the lake freighter Sevona, took on cargo at the same pier shortly after Pretoria. Both ships sank the very next day near the Apostle Islands when a legendary gale sent them to the bottom of Lake Superior.
