= Sand Island (Wisconsin) =

One of the Apostle Islands

Coordinates: 46°58′45″N 090°56′55″W

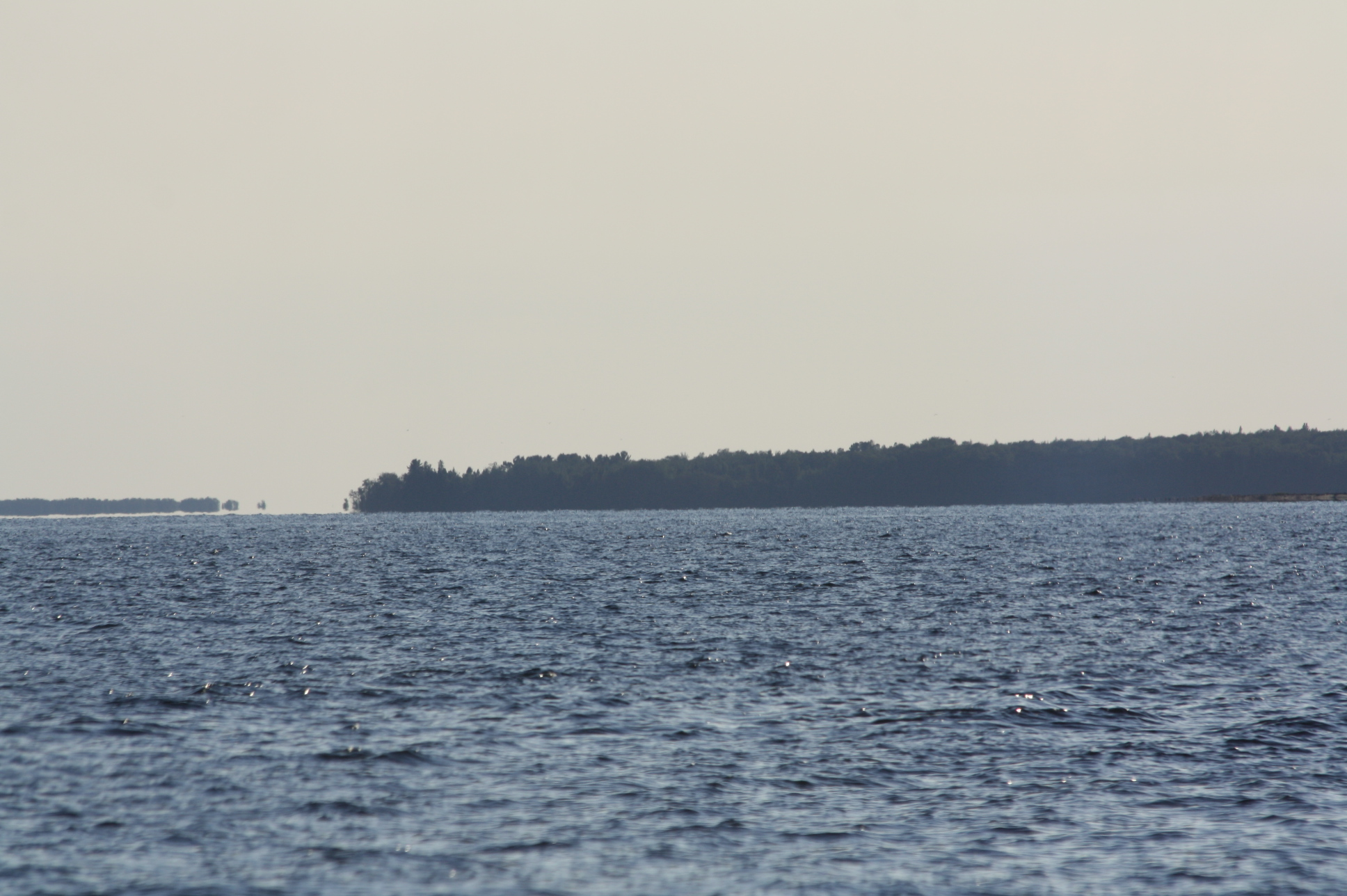
Sand Island

Sand Island is one of the Apostle Islands, in northern Wisconsin, in Lake Superior, and is part of the Apostle Islands National Lakeshore. It is located in the Town of Bayfield in Bayfield County. The Sand Island Light, the Sevona Cabin, the Shaw Farm and the West Bay Club are located on the island. There is another Sand Island Lake Chippewa in Sawyer County, Wisconsin.
