= Raspberry Island Light =

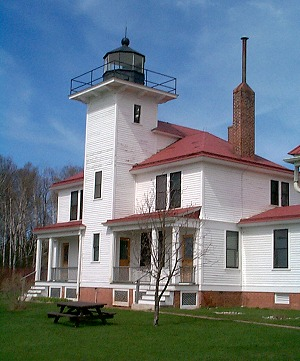
- Location: Raspberry Island, Wisconsin
- Coordinates: 46°58′13.2″N 90°48′17.47″W

Tower
- Foundation: Stone
- Construction: Wood
- Automated: 1947
- Height: 43 feet (13 m)
- Shape: Square, attached white bldg. w/red roof
- Markings: white w/black trim & lantern
- Heritage: National Register of Historic Places contributing property

Light
- First lit: 1862
- Focal height: 77 feet (23 m)
- Lens: Fifth order Fresnel lens
- Range: 7 nautical miles (13 km; 8.1 mi)
- Characteristic: Fl W 2.5s
- Raspberry Island Light
- U.S. Historic district – Contributing property
- Area: 33.8 acres (13.7 ha)
- Built: 1857
- Built by: United States Lighthouse Service
- Part of: Apostle Islands Lighthouses (ID77000145)
- Designated CP: March 8, 1977

The Raspberry Island Lighthouse is a lighthouse located on the southern part of Raspberry Island, marking the west channel of the Apostle Islands in Lake Superior in Bayfield County, Wisconsin, near the city of Bayfield. It was erected in 1862, marking the western channel.

== History ==
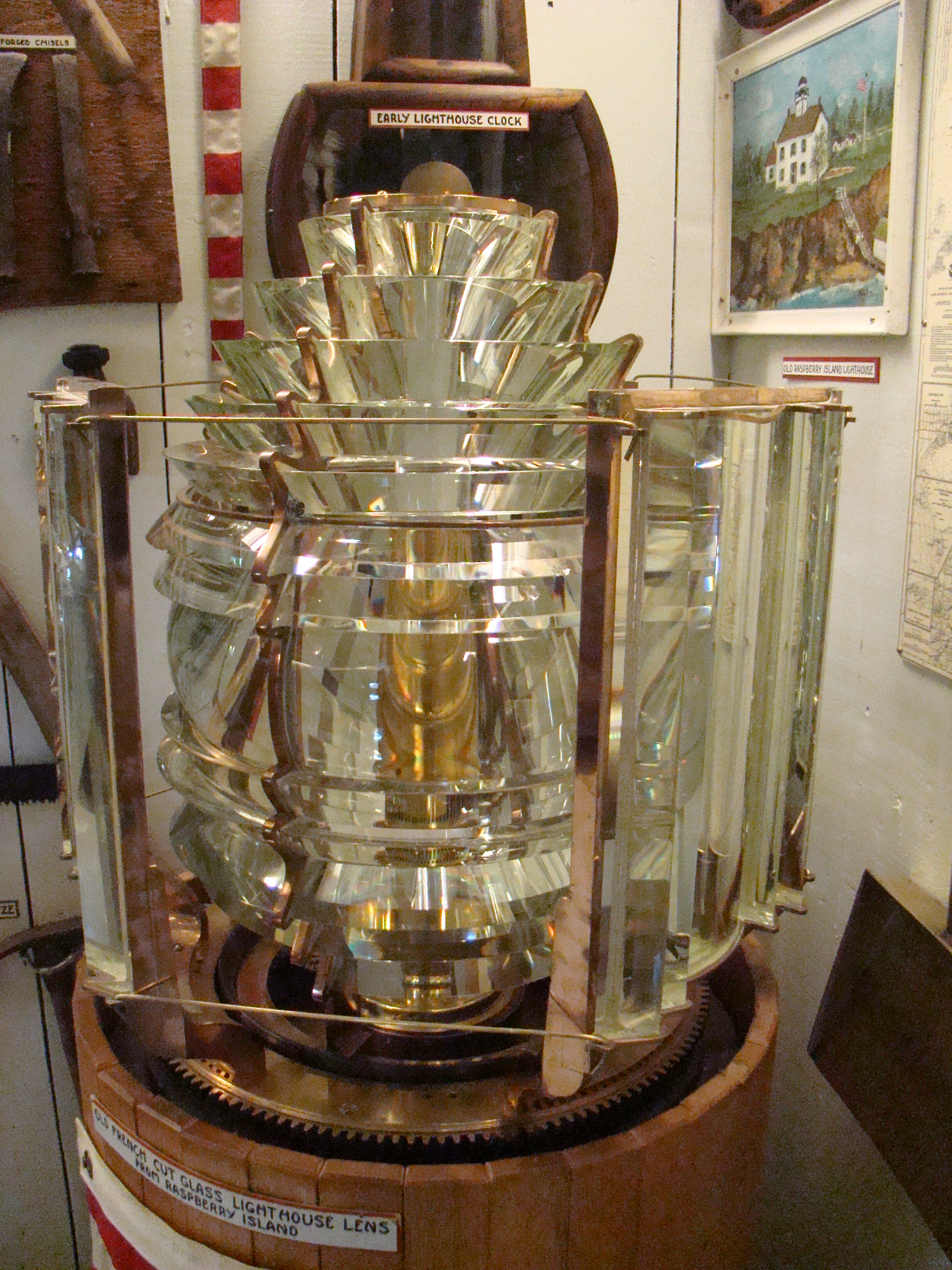
The original lens is on display at the Madeline Island Historical Museum

It is said to be one of the few surviving wood framed lighthouses left on Lake Superior. The complex includes a square tower rising up from the attached Lighthouse keeper's quarters, a brick fog signal building, frame barn, brick oil house, boathouse, two outhouses, and a dock.

The light was automated in 1947 and was later transferred to the National Park Service as part of the Apostle Islands National Lakeshore. It is a contributing property of the Apostle Islands Lighthouses and was added to the National Register of Historic Places in 1977. It is also listed in the Library of Congress Historic American Buildings Survey, WI-312. The original Fresnel lens is on display at the Madeline Island Historical Museum.

The old battery system in the fog signal building was replaced by a solar powered 300 mm Tideland Signal acrylic optic atop a pole, which continues to light the island to this day. The location is an active aid to navigation, with a characteristic white flash every 2.5 seconds.

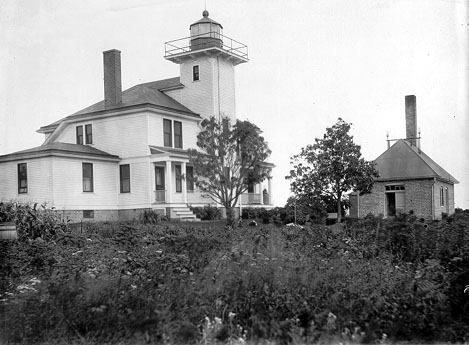
USCG archive photo

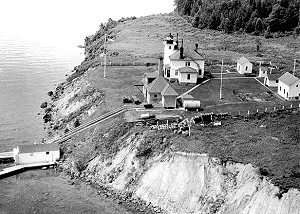
1940s overview of the Raspberry Island Light Station

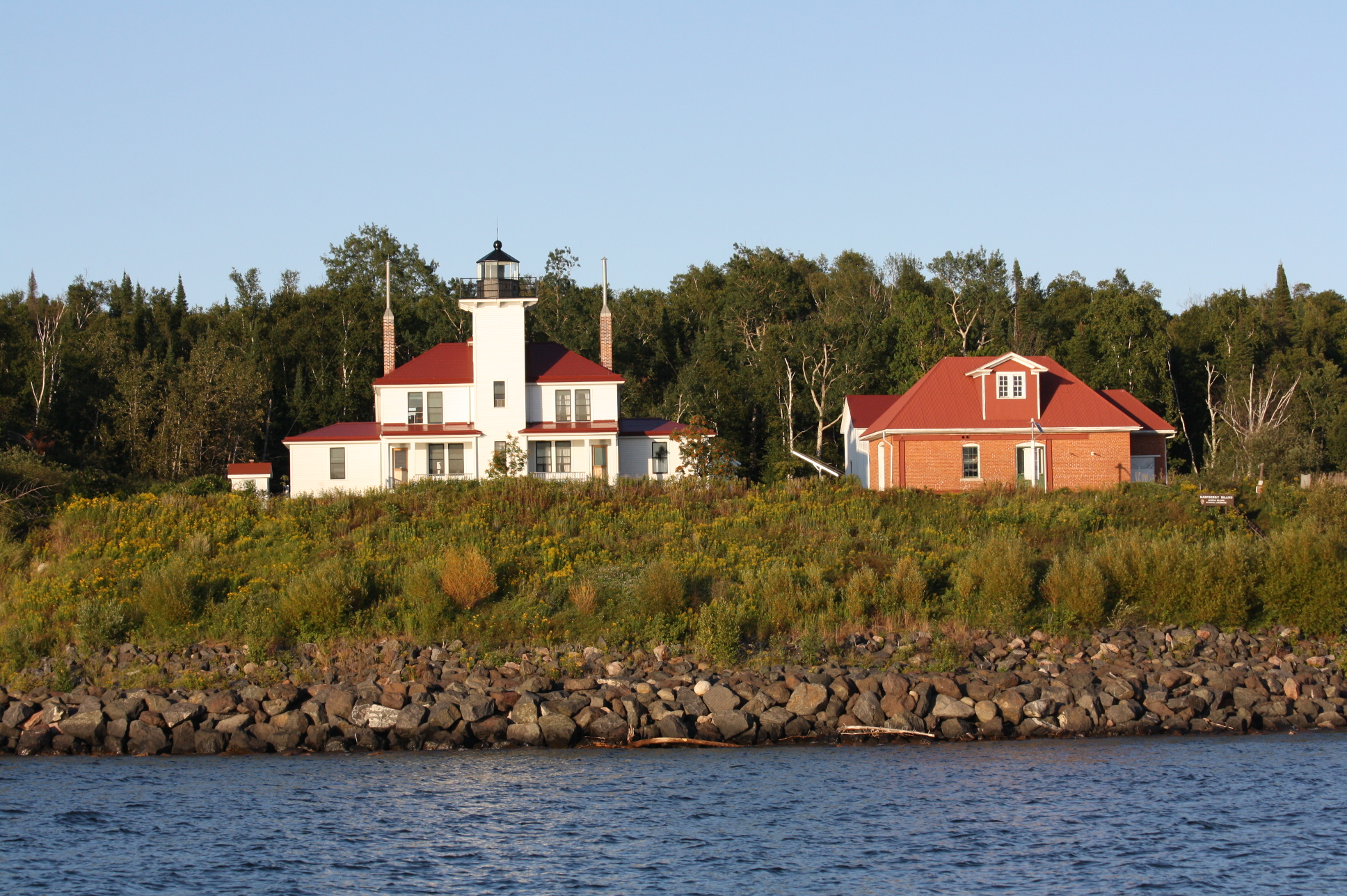
Raspberry Island Light Station from Lake Superior

== Access ==
Most of the Apostle Islands light stations may be viewed (but not accessed) on the Apostle Islands Cruise Service water taxi or by private boat during the summer. During the Annual Apostle Island Lighthouse Celebration Ferry tour service is available for all the lighthouses. In the tourist season, park rangers are on the island to greet visitors.

== See also ==
- Apostle Islands Lighthouses
