= Madeline Island Museum =

Museum and State Historical Site in Ashland County, Wisconsin

- IUCN category V (protected landscape/seascape)
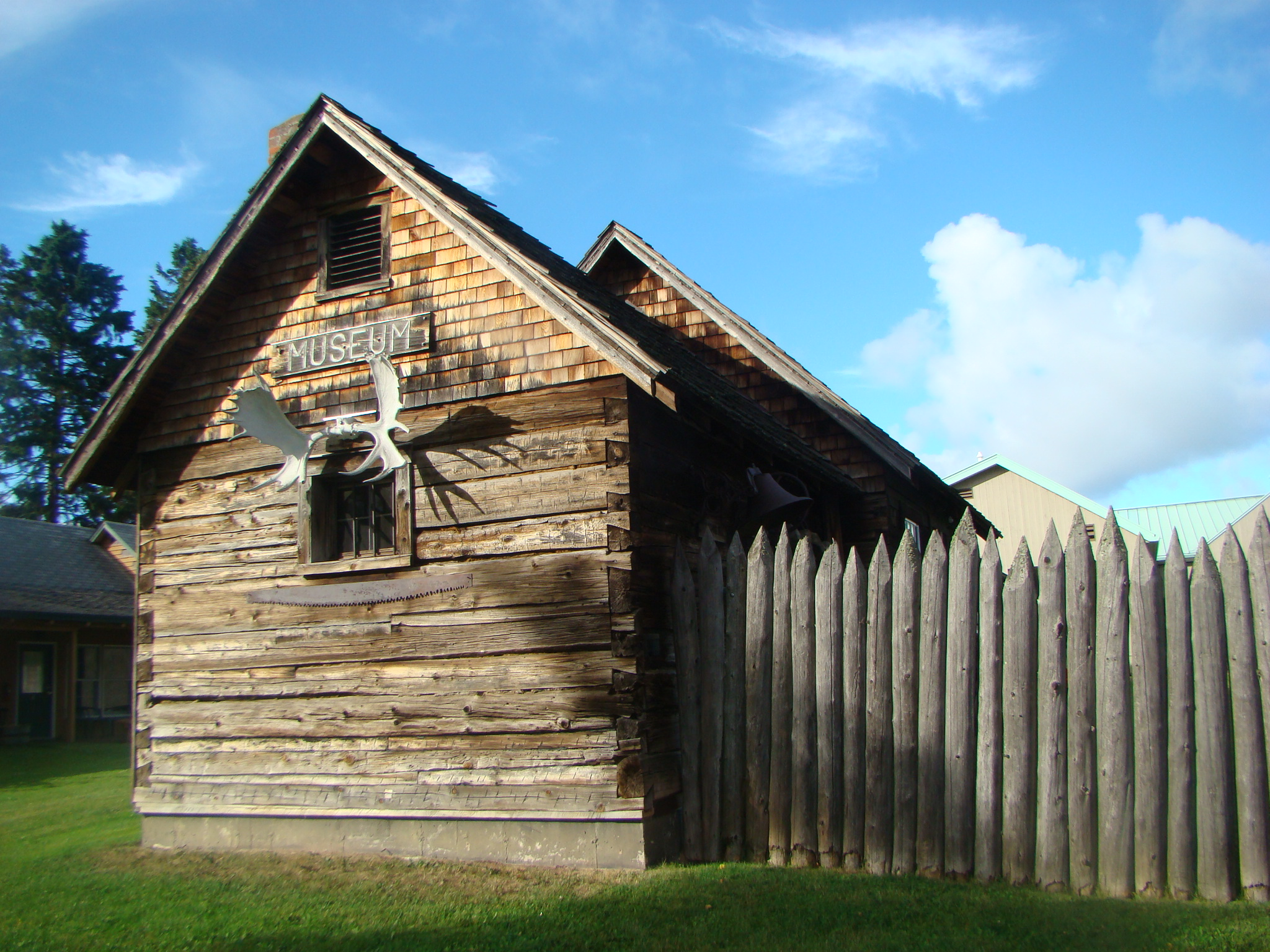
- Madeline Island Museum

- Location within Wisconsin Location within the United States
- Location: Eagle, Wisconsin, United States
- Coordinates: 46°46′50″N 90°47′17″W
- Established: 1976
- Governing body: Wisconsin Historical Society
- Website: madelineislandmuseum.wisconsinhistory.org

Madeline Island Museum is a museum owned and operated by the Wisconsin Historical Society. Opened on June 15, 1958, the museum is in the town of La Pointe, Wisconsin on Madeline Island, one of the Apostle Islands in Lake Superior. Madeline Island Museum was developed on the former site of the American Fur Company Northern Outfit, and its main building once served as an American Fur Company warehouse. The museum can be reached by boat or by the Madeline Island Ferry.

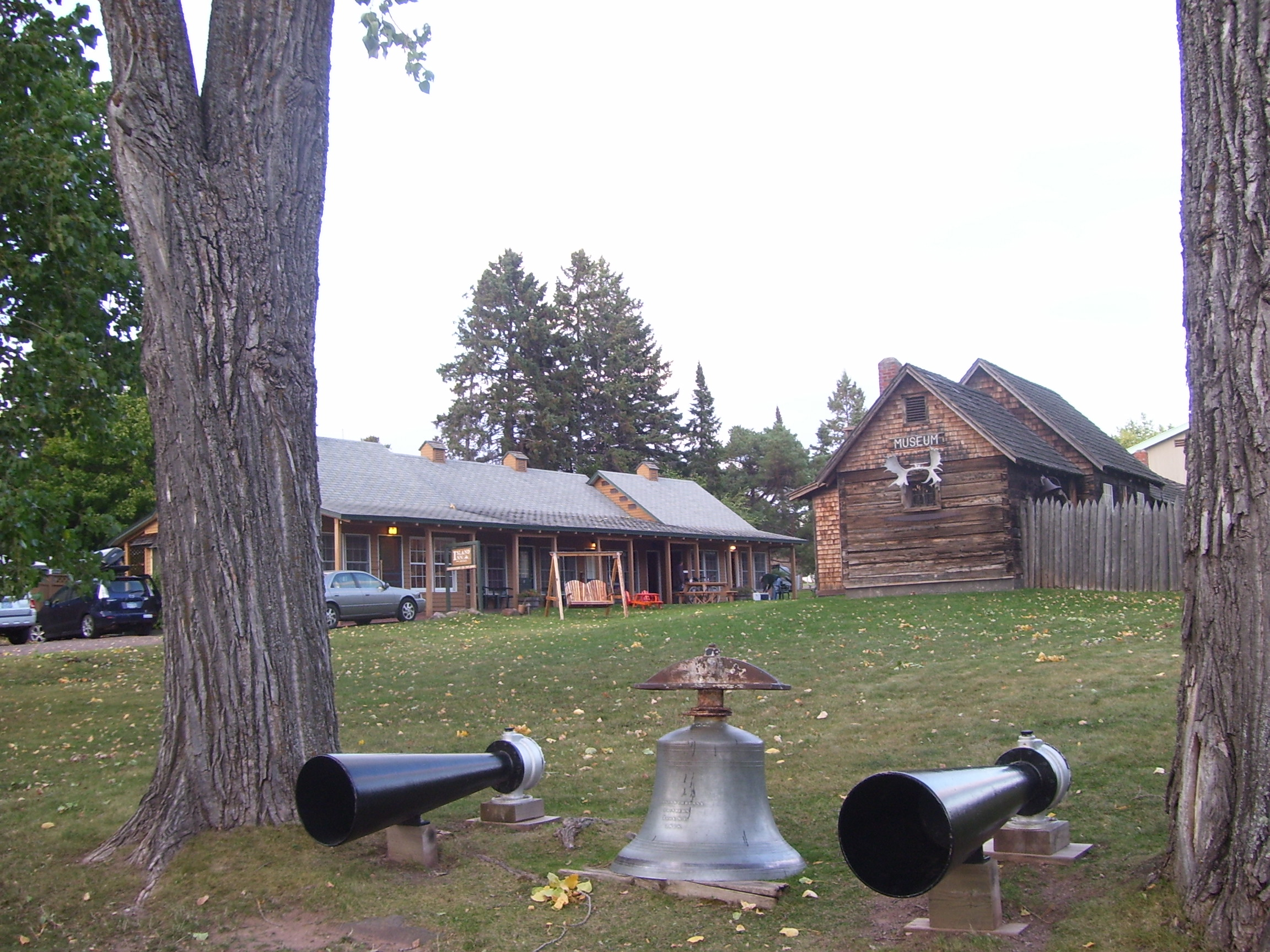
Front lawn of the museum

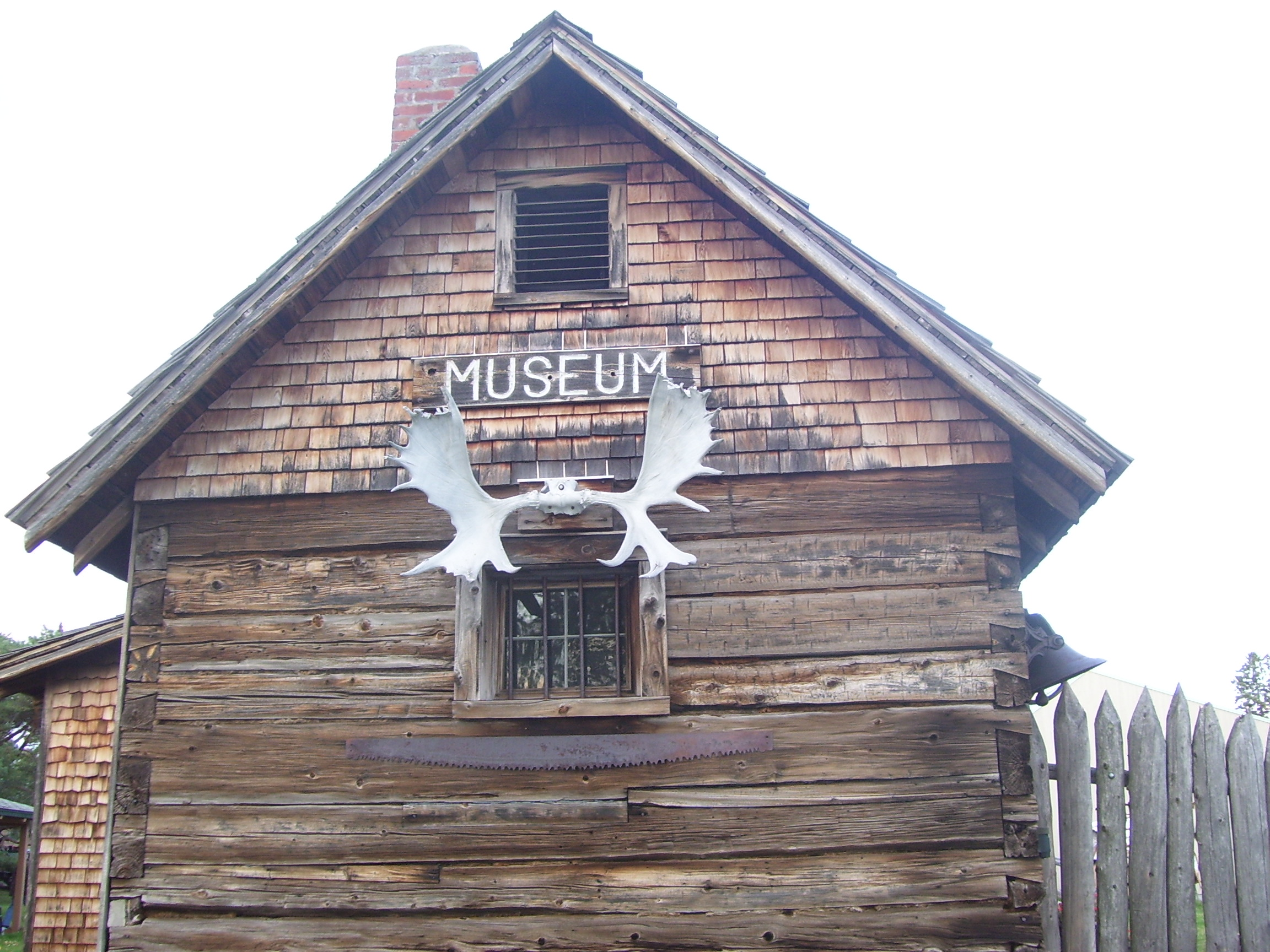
One of the museum's historic buildings

Madeline Island is the only member of the Apostle Islands that is not included in the Apostle Islands National Lakeshore, and is therefore the only island in the group open to commercial development. The historic unincorporated community of La Pointe, was established by French fur traders as a trading post in 1693. Later, in the 19th century, the American Fur Company established a post on the island. Because it was an ancient Native American settlement, and had served for so long as a fur trading site, as well as being the center of early missionary efforts in the area, Madeline Island was deemed an ideal location for a museum relating to important aspects of Wisconsin's history. Inspired by the island's history, two longtime summer residents of the island, Leo and Bella Capser, began organizing in 1955 to create Madeline Island Museum. With the help of many other residents of the island, they compiled a large collection of local artifacts for the museum. To house the artifacts, a wooden structure was constructed by combining pieces of several of the island's historic buildings, including a former La Pointe jail and the American Fur Company's post. The museum opened on June 15, 1958. Ten years later, it was transferred to the Wisconsin Historical Society, which has operated the museum ever since.

Today Madeline Island Museum features exhibits on several aspects of Madeline Island history. The main displays focus on the area's Native American tribes, the fur trade, early missionaries who visited Madeline Island, and the region's maritime history. These exhibits are housed in two buildings, the original museum building built in the 1950s and the Casper Center, an exhibit hall constructed in the 1990s. As of 2004, the museum had approximately twelve thousand visitors annually.
