= List of shipwrecks in Lake Superior =

Map of the Great Lakes, with Lake Superior in darker blue

Since the loss of the fur trading schooner Invincible in the vicinity of Whitefish Point in 1816, there have been several notable shipwrecks on Lake Superior. Out of the known shipwrecks in the lake, 34 of them are listed on the National Register of Historic Places, within the waters of Michigan, Minnesota, and Wisconsin. This list includes both shipwrecks in Lake Superior and the Saint Louis River.

== List ==
Ship	Ship type	Build date	Sunk date	Flag	Fate	Coordinates	Image	Sources
115	Whaleback barge	1891	1899	United States		48.698056°N 86.654722°W		
A. A. Parker	Wooden bulk freighter	1884	1903	United States		46.76664°N 85.96683°W		
A. Booth	Wooden steamer	1886	1887	United States	Sank near Beaver Bay, Minnesota on July 28, 1887 after having been raised after a previous sinking.			
A. C. Adams	Wooden tug	1881	1923	United States	Built in Buffalo, New York, in 1881. Abandoned in circa 1923 near Duluth, Minnesota. Wreck located in 1990.	46°49.182′N 91°59.301′W		
Acadia	Composite package freighter	1867	1896	Canada		47.733662°N 84.977768°W		
Adella Shores	Wooden steam barge	1894	1909	United States		47.041111°N 86.020556°W		
Alex Nimick	Wooden bulk freighter	1890	1907	United States		46.763450°N 85.188350°W		
A. L. Hopkins	Wooden steam barge	1880	1911	United States	The A. L. Hopkins left Bayfield, Wisconsin on October 2, 1911 with a cargo of lumber. The same day she ran into a vicious squall which almost capsized her, and left her waterlogged. On October 3, 1911, her crew was rescued by the freighter Alva C. Dinkey. For the next who weeks, the Hopkins floated about Lake Superior until October 17, 1911, when she was sighted by the freighter William E. Corey off Michigan Island.			
Alfred P. Wright	Wooden bulk freighter	1888	1915	United States		46.965833°N 88.440000°W		
Algoma	Steel package freighter	1883	1885	Canada		48.111389°N 88.531944°W		
Altadoc	Steel bulk freighter	1901	1927	Canada		47.453825°N 87.738088°W		
Amboy	Wooden schooner-barge	1874	1905	United States	On November 28, 1905 the Amboy and her towing steamer George Spencer were bound from Buffalo, New York for Duluth, Minnesota with a cargo of coal. They were eventually caught by the Mataafa Storm and ran aground near Schroeder, Minnesota. Listed on the National Register of Historic Places in 1994.	47.478089°N 90.999858°W		
Amethyst	Wooden tug	1868	1888	United States				
America	Steel passenger ship	1898	1928	United States		47.893861°N 89.222361°W		
Antelope	Wooden schooner barge	1861	1897	United States	On October 7, 1897 while under tow of the steamer Hiram W. Sibley with a cargo of coal, she sprang a leak off Michigan Island and sank. Wreck located in 2016, and listed on the National Register of Historic Places in 2018.	46°49.08′N 90°27.14′W		
Annie M. Peterson	Wooden schooner barge	1874	1914	United States				
Arbutus	Wooden tug	1887	1921	Canada				
Arctic	Wooden paddle steamer	1851	1860	United States		46.959389°N 87.999444°W		
Arlington	Steel canaller	1913	1940	Canada		47.922667°N 87.572500°W		
Atlanta	Wooden schooner-barge	1890	1891	United States		47.175833°N 85.692833°W		
Aurania	Steel bulk freighter	1895	1909	United States		46.617075°N 84.762306°W		
A. W. Comstock	Wooden schooner-barge	1895	1895	United States				
Bannockburn	Steel bulk freighter	1893	1902	Canada				
Batchawana	Wooden package freighter	1881	1907	Canada	Burned off Rousseau Island, near Coppermine Point on 26 June 1907.	46.989889°N 84.789806°W		
Belle P. Cross	Wooden steam barge	1870	1903	United States	Built in 1870, in Trenton, Michigan. Only the rudder has been found.	47°08.45′N 91°26.45′W		
Benjamin Noble	Steel canaller	1909	1914	United States	Wreck located in 2004, and listed on the National Register of Historic Places in 2007.	46°56.00′N 91°40.00′W		
Bennington	Wooden scow	1891	1908	United States				
Bermuda	Wooden schooner	1860	1870/1883	United States		46.466225°N 86.643800°W		
Bertha Endress	Wooden fish tug	1876	1891	Canada				
Big Bay sloop	Wooden sloop				Small unidentified sloop believed to have been built between 1880 and 1920. Listed on the National Register of Historic Places in 2009.	46°48.31′N 90°38.44′W		
Bob Anderson	Wooden tug	1862	1899	United States	Burned near Colvill, Minnesota on August 5, 1899.	47.603333°N 90.691667°W		
Brandon	Wooden schooner	1887	1888	Canada				
B. W. Arnold	Wooden steam barge	1885	1896	United States		47.173278°N 88.751889°W		
Cecelia	Wooden schooner	1865	1883	Canada				
Cerisoles	Navarin-class minesweeper	1918	1918	France				
C. F. Curtis	Wooden steam barge	1882	1914	United States		47.036333°N 85.904667°W		
Charles H. Bradley	Wooden steam barge	1890	1931	United States		47.035500°N 88.483667°W		
Charles Hebard	Wooden steam barge	1888	1902	United States				
Charles J. Kershaw	Wooden bulk freighter	1874	1895	United States		46.509333°N 87.3635°W		
Charles J. Sheffield	Steel bulk freighter	1887	1889	United States				
Chauncy Hurlbut	Wooden bulk freighter	1873	1908	United States				
Chester A. Congdon	Steel bulk freighter	1907	1918	United States		48.193333°N 88.514444°W		
Chicago	Steel package freighter	1901	1929	United States		47.732033°N 85.961983°W		
City of Ashland	Wooden paddle steamer	1883	1887	United States	On August 8, 1887 the City of Ashland was towing logs to a sawmill in Ashland, Wisconsin. When she was off Washburn, Wisconsin, a fire was discovered at the back of her pilothouse. The fire spread quickly and destroyed most of her hull. Eventually, she burned to the waterline with the loss of one life.			
City of Bangor	Steel bulk freighter	1896	1927	United States		47.456167°N 87.746°W		
City of St. Joseph	Steel barge	1890	1942	United States		47.470000°N 88.112500°W		
City of Superior	Wooden package freighter	1857	1857	United States		47.471667°N 87.856667°W		
City of Winnipeg	Wooden steamer	1870	1881	Canada	On July 19, 1881 the City of Winnipeg was in Duluth, Minnesota unloading her cargo of whisky and horses when a fire was discovered in wood pocket near her engine room. She eventually burned to the waterline with the loss of 4 lives. In July 1898 she was raised, and scuttled somewhere off Park Point in Lake Superior.	46.766667°N 92.033333°W		
Colorado	Wooden package freighter	1867	1898	United States		47.428667°N 88.298833°W		
Columbus	Wooden tug	1874	1909	Canada		47.566725°N 84.968283°W		
Comet	Wooden package freighter	1857	1875	United States		46.716467°N 84.866867°W		
Comet	Wooden tug	1881	1897	United States				
Comrade	Wooden schooner-barge	1883	1890	United States				
Culligan	Wooden bulk freighter	1883	1912	United States				
Cumberland	Wooden paddle steamer	1871	1877	Canada		47.85775°N 89.3275°W		
Cyprus	Steel bulk freighter	1907	1907	United States		46.787333°N 85.6°W		
Dagmar	Wooden fish tug	1914	1935					
D. Leuty	Wooden steam barge	1882	1911	United States		46.546000°N 87.374000°W		
D. M. Clemson	Steel bulk freighter	1903	1908	United States				
Donna Marie	Wooden fish tug	1938	1938	United States				
Dunelm	Steel canaller	1907	1910	Canada		48.200833°N 88.489333°W		
Edmund Fitzgerald	Steel bulk freighter	1958	1975	United States		46.998333°N 85.11°W		
Emerald	Wooden paddle steamer	1862	Between 1893 and 1902	United States	Abandoned near the Lake Superior District Power Plant in Ashland, Wisconsin between 1893 and 1902.	46°35.896′N 090°52.887′W		
Emma A. Mayers	Wooden schooner-barge	1871	1884	United States				
Emperor	Steel bulk freighter	1910	1947	Canada		48.200556°N 88.491667°W		
Essayons	Steel tug	1908	2009	United States		46°46′26″N 92°06′19.2″W		
E. T. Carrington	Wooden tug	1876	1907	United States				
Fedora	Wooden bulk freighter	1889	1901	United States	On September 20, 1901 the Fedora bound from Duluth, Minnesota to Ashland, Wisconsin to pick up a load of iron ore. While between Basswood Island and Red Cliff Bay, a kerosene lamp fell in the engine room and started a fire. Eventually, the Fedora was beached near Chicago Creek and burned to the water's edge.	46°51.602′N 090°46.722′W		
Ferdinand Schlesinger	Wooden bulk freighter	1891	1919	United States				
Frank W. Wheeler	Wooden schooner-barge	1884	1885	United States		47.169333°N 85.788000°W		
Frank Perew	Wooden schooner-barge	1867	1891	United States				
Fred B. Hall	Wooden tug	1883	1909	United States				
Gale Staples	Wooden bulk freighter	1888	1918	Canada		46.679500°N 86.151667°W		
Gazelle	Wooden paddle steamer	1858	1860	United States	Wrecked in Eagle Harbor, Michigan on 8 or 10 September 1860, after missing the piers and running aground.	47.457167°N 88.1545°W		
Geneva	Wooden bulk freighter	1873	1873	United States				
George M. Cox	Steel package freighter	1901	1933	United States		47.8577°N 89.323083°W		
George Nester	Wooden schooner-barge	1887	1909	United States		46.966500°N 88.003333°W		
George Spencer	Wooden bulk freighter	1884	1905	United States	On November 28, 1905 the George Spencer and her towing steamer Amboy were bound from Buffalo, New York for Duluth, Minnesota with a cargo of coal. They were eventually caught by the Mataafa Storm and ran aground near Schroeder, Minnesota. Listed on the National Register of Historic Places in 1994.	47.4779°N 90.9983°W		
Glenlyon	Steel package freighter	1893	1924	Canada		47.952222°N 88.748056°W		
Golden Rule	Wooden schooner	1856	1883	Canada				
Golspie	Wooden package freighter	1882	1906	Canada		47.785292°N 84.900773°W		
Gray Oak	Wooden scow-schooner	1885	1911	Canada		48.345750°N 89.106500°W		
Green River	Wooden barge	1887	1931	Canada		48.365533°N 89.142917°W		
Gunilda	Steel yacht	1897	1911	United States		48.784167°N 87.422222°W		
Harriet B.	Wooden barge	1895	1922	United States	At around 1:00 A.M. on May 3, 1922 the Harriet B. in tow of the steamer C.W. Jacob were loaded with pulpwood and were about 7 miles off Two Harbors, Minnesota, but due to the dense fog, the captain of the Jacob decided not to enter the harbor immediately. At around 4:50 A.M. the freighter Quincy A. Shaw rammed the Harriet B. almost cutting her in two. She sank in about 20 minutes. Wreck located in 2005, and listed on the National Register of Historic Places in 2018.	46.966667°N 91.7°W		
H. D. Coffinberry	Wooden bulk freighter	1874	Between 1912 and 1917	United States	Abandoned near Red Cliff, Wisconsin, between 1912 and 1917.	46°53.008′N 090°45.802′W		
Henry B. Smith	Steel bulk freighter	1906	1913	United States		46.914°N 87.333°W		
Henry Chisholm	Wooden bulk freighter	1880	1898	United States		47.85765°N 89.327983°W		
Henry Steinbrenner	Steel bulk freighter	1901	1953	United States		47.764972°N 88.731028°W		
Herman H. Hettler	Wooden steam barge	1890	1927	United States		46.483833°N 86.599667°W		
H. E. Runnels	Wooden steam barge	1893	1919	United States	Ran aground near Grand Marais, on 14 November 1919, while laden with coal, later breaking up.	46.681389°N 85.973333°W		
Hesper	Wooden bulk freighter	1890	1905	United States	On May 3, 1905 while on the way to Two Harbors, Minnesota, the Hesper was driven off course, and ran aground on a reef near Silver Bay, Minnesota. A wave eventually lifted her off the reef, and she sank in deeper water and broke up. Listed on the National Register of Historic Places in 1994.	47°16.17′N 91°16.18′W		
Howard	Wooden tug	1864	1921	United States		48.080967°N 89.36275°W		
Hudson	Steel package freighter	1887	1901	United States		47.443683°N 88.393383°W		
Hunter	Wooden package freighter	1877	1904	United States		46.674167°N 85.979583°W		
Huronton	Steel canaller	1898	1923	Canada		47.008167°N 85.174167°W		
Inkerman	Navarin-class minesweeper	1918	1918	France				
Iosco	Wooden bulk freighter	1891	1905	United States				
Ira H. Owen	Steel bulk freighter	1887	1905	United States	On November 28, 1905 the Ira H. Owen left Duluth, Minnesota with a cargo of barley bound for Buffalo, New York. As she approached the Apostle Islands, she started to encounter some bad weather, but at the time her captain decided against seeking shelter. Just as she passed Outer Island, she was struck by the full force of what was later to be known as the Mataafa Storm. Later that day, she was spotted by the freighter Harold B. Nye, and appeared to be in trouble. After about two hours, the Nye tried to look for the Owen but she was nowhere to be seen.			
Isle Royale	Wooden steamer	1879	1885	United States	On July 27, 1885 the Isle Royale struck a reef during a minor storm and developed a leak while sailing near the Susie Islands. She eventually sank with no fatalities.			
J. Bigler	Wooden scow–schooner	1866	1884	United States				
James Gayley	Steel bulk freighter	1902	1912	United States				
James P. Donaldson	Wooden steam barge	1880	1923	Canada		48.278569°N 88.988440°W		
James Pickands	Wooden bulk freighter	1886	1894	United States		47.428500°N 88.298833°W		
J. L. Crane	Wooden schooner-barge	1891	1925	United States				
John B. Cowle	Steel bulk freighter	1902	1909	United States		46.804517°N 84.9641°W		
John Jacob Astor	Wooden schooner	1835	1844	United States		47.472333°N 87.864667°W		
John M. Hutchinson	Wooden schooner barge	1873	1905	United States				
John Mitchell	Steel bulk freighter	1906	1911	United States		46.834167°N 85.080167°W		
John M. Osborn	Wooden steam barge	1882	1884	United States		46.866233°N 85.086833°W		
John Owen	Composite bulk freighter	1889	1919	United States				
J. S. Seaverns	Wooden steam barge	1880	1884	United States		47.936373°N 84.881286°W		
Judge Hart	Steel canaller	1923	1942	Canada		48.774°N 86.725867°W		
Jupiter	Wooden schooner-barge	1872	1872	United States		46.731700°N 85.330167°W		
Kakabeka	Wooden ferry	1885	1895	Canada		48.330806°N 88.775972°W		
Kamloops	Steel canaller	1924	1927	Canada		48.0853°N 88.766667°W		
Kiowa	Steel ocean freighter	1920	1929	United States		46.645167°N 86.220167°W		
Lafayette	Steel bulk freighter	1900	1905	United States	On November 28, 1905 the Lafayette and her consort, the Manila were on their way to Two Harbors, Minnesota, when they were struck by the Mataafa Storm. The storm caused them to go aground behind Encampment Island. The Lafayette broke in two when the Manila collided with her. After the storm, the Manila was rescued, but only the stern of the Lafayette was rescued, as her bow had already gone to pieces.	47°05.695′N 91°32.961′W		
Lambton	Lighthouse tender	1908	1922	Canada				
Langham	Wooden bulk freighter	1888	1910	United States		47.372833°N 87.925500°W		
Leafield	Steel ocean freighter	1892	1913	United Kingdom				
Lewis	Wooden schooner	1884	1904	United States				
Liberty	Wooden steamer	1889	1919	United States	Burned, and became a total loss on July 6, 1919 near Grand Marais, Minnesota.	47°44.45′N 90°20.15′W		
Lizzie Sutton	Wooden steam yacht	1876	1886	United States				
Lotta Bernard	Wooden paddle steamer	1869	1874	United States	On October 29, 1874 the Lotta Bernard was bound from Fort William, Ontario for Duluth, Minnesota with a cargo of flour, fish and a horse, when she ran into a powerful blizzard near Castle Danger, Minnesota and sank taking the lives of three of her crew.			
Lucerne	Wooden schooner	1873	1886	United States	On October 15, 1886 while loaded with iron ore bound from Ashland, Wisconsin for Cleveland, Ohio, the Lucerne was caught in a storm, and decided to head for the safety of Chequamegon Bay. After two or three days after she was last seen, she grounded and sank with the loss of all hands. Listed on the National Register of Historic Places in 1991.	46°43.23′N 90°46.02′W		
Madeira	Steel barge	1900	1905	United States	On November 28, 1905 the Madeira was being towed towards Duluth, Minnesota by the freighter William Edenborn. At about 3:30 A.M., the captain of the Edenborn decided to cit the Madeira loose. At about 5:30 A.M. the Madeira struck Gold Rock where she sank with the loss of one life. Listed on the National Register of Historic Places in 1992.	47°12.22′N 91°21.29′W		
Maggie McRae	Wooden schooner	1872	1888	Canada				
Manhattan	Wooden steamboat	1847	1859	United States		46.675350°N 85.968467°W		
Manhattan	Wooden bulk freighter	1887	1903	United States		46.467361°N 86.609333°W		
Manistee	Wooden steamer	1867	1883	United States	On November 10, 1883 the Manistee left Duluth, Minnesota with 7 passengers and a 400-ton cargo bound for Ontonagon, Michigan. On November 11, 1883 she sought shelter in Bayfield, Wisconsin; while in port she transferred some of her passengers to the steamer City of Duluth. On November 16, 1883 she headed back out on to Lake Superior, and then disappeared somewhere east of the apostle Islands.			
Maplehurst	Steel bulk freighter	1892	1922	Canada		47.231833°N 88.634167°W		
Marquette	Wooden bulk freighter	1881	1903	United States	On October 15, 1903 while hauling iron ore from Ashland, Wisconsin bound for Cleveland, Ohio, she sprang a leak off Michigan Island and sank. Wreck located in 2005, and listed on the National Register of Historic Places in 2008.	46°50.02′N 90°25.47′W		
Mary Ann	Wooden tug	1867	1901	Canada		48.35435°N 89.1196°W		
Mary Ann Hulbert	Wooden schooner	1856	1883	United States				
Mary E. McLachlan	Wooden schooner-barge	1893	1921	Canada		48.910833°N 87.800833°W		
Mary Jarecki	Wooden bulk freighter	1871	1883	United States		46.667419°N 86.166082°W		
Mary Martini	Wooden steamer	1877	1885	United States	On December 3, 1885 the Mary Martini stranded and burned to a total loss southwest of Grand Portage, Minnesota.			
Mayflower	Wooden scow	1887	1891	United States	On June 2, 1891 the Mayflower was bound for Duluth, Minnesota with a cargo of sandstone. While about four miles off Duluth, Minnesota, she capsized with the loss of one life. Wreck located in 1991, and listed on the National Register of Historic Places in 2012.	46°48.12′N 92°0.40′W		
Merchant	Wooden schooner	1834	1847	United States				
Mesquite	Mesquite-class buoy tender	1942	1989	United States	Ran aground on a rock ledge off Keweenaw Point, Michigan while tending a light buoy. Was deemed unable to be refloated and was sunk as a donation to the Michigan Department of Natural Resources.	47.383484°N 87.733424°W		
Michael Groh	Wooden steam barge	1871	1895	United States	Stranded and broke in two near Munising, Michigan, on 22 November 1895, after losing her rudder and drifting ashore, while laden with lumber.	46.461667°N 86.597833°W		
Michigan	Wooden scow-schooner	1873	1893	United States	Originally built as a rail ferry. Foundered off Poit AuSable on 22 September 1893, while in tow of the freighter City of Naples, bound from Marquette, for Ashtabula, Ohio, with iron ore.			
Michigan	Wooden schooner-barge	1874	1901	United States		46.917333°N 85.102333°W		
Mingoe	Wooden schooner-barge	1893	1928	United States				
Missoula	Wooden bulk freighter	1887	1895	United States				
M. M. Drake	Wooden bulk freighter	1882	1901	United States		46.779167°N 85.097833°W		
Monarch	Wooden package freighter	1890	1906	Canada		48.188889°N 88.434167°W		
Monkshaven	Steel ocean freighter	1882	1905	United Kingdom		48.2355°N 89.006117°W		
Monticello	Wooden steamboat	1847	1851	United States		47.221667°N 88.67°W		
Moonlight	Wooden schooner barge	1874	1903	United States	On September 13, 1903 while hauling iron ore from Ashland, Wisconsin, the Moonlight sprang a leak and sank off Michigan Island. Wreck located in 2005, and listed on the National Register of Historic Places in 2008.	46°49.56′N 90°22.42′W		
M. R. Warner	Wooden schooner barge	1873	1893	United States	On November 2, 1893 while carrying lumber from Duluth, Minnesota, the M.R. Warner broke loose from her towing steamer, and went aground on Sand Island.			
Myron	Wooden steam barge	1888	1919	United States		46.807717°N 85.027433°W		
Neebing	Steel steam barge	1892	1937	Canada		48.663333°N 88.13°W		
Nelson	Wooden schooner	1866	1899	United States		46.767167°N 85.608000°W		
Neshoto	Wooden bulk freighter	1889	1908	United States		46.786761°N 85.248428°W		
Niagara	Wooden tug	1872	1904	United States	On June 4, 1904 the Niagara was on her way to Duluth, Minnesota to pick up some construction equipment bound for Lake Huron, when she ran aground on Knife Island near Knife River, Minnesota with no fatalities. Listed on the National Register of Historic Places in 1994.	46°56.45′N 91°46.16′W		
Noquebay	Wooden schooner barge	1872	1905	United States	On October 6, 1905 while hauling lumber from Bayfield, Wisconsin bound for Buffalo, New York, the Noquebay caught fire. Her towing steamer, the Lizzie Madden beached her on Stockton Island where she burned to the waterline. Listed on the National Register of Historic Places in 1992.	46°55.568′N 90°32.717′W		
Northerner	Wooden bulk freighter	1876	1892	United States		46.758889°N 88.458611°W		
Nucleus	Wooden barquentine	1848	1869	United States	Sprang a leak during a storm and sank on 21 September 1869, while downbound with iron ore from Marquette. Wreck located in 2021.	47.192833°N 85.7245°W		
Olive Jeanette	Wooden bulk freighter	1890	1907	United States		47.068889°N 87.912222°W		
Onoko	Iron bulk freighter	1882	1915	United States	On September 15, 1915 the Onoko departed Duluth, Minnesota with a cargo of wheat bound for Toledo, Ohio. When she was sailing off Knife River, Minnesota, she sprang a major leak and sank in about 35 minutes with no fatalities. Wreck located in 1988, and listed on the National Register of Historic Places in 1992.	46°50.772′N 91°46.640′W		
Ontario	Wooden package freighter	1873	1899	Canada		48.753333°N 87.533167°W		
Ontario	Steel barge	1891	1927	United States	On October 13, 1927 while hauling pulpwood from Port Arthur, Ontario bound for Ashland, Wisconsin, the Ontario encountered a storm off Outer Island. Eventually, the storm overwhelmed her pumps and she sank with no fatalities. Wreck discovered in 2012.	47.122487°N 90.303111°W		
Orinoco	Wooden bulk freighter	1898	1924	United States				
Oriole	Wooden schooner	1857	1862	United States				
Ottawa	Wooden tug	1881	1909	United States	On November 29, 1909 after freeing a stranded steamer off Outer Island, the Ottawa caught fire. While being towed to Bayfield, Wisconsin, she burned to the waterline near Red Cliff, Wisconsin. Listed on the National Register of Historic Places in 1992.	46°52′59.5″N 90°45′49.1″W		
Ottawa	Steel canaller	1900	1909	Canada				
Pacific	Wooden steam barge	1864	1887	United States		46.679500°N 85.625000°W		
Panama	Wooden bulk freighter	1888	1906	United States		46.83775°N 89.549417°W		
Panther	Wooden bulk freighter	1890	1916	Canada		46.63835°N 84.806167°W		
Pasadena	Wooden barge	1889	1906	United States	Grounded at the entry to the Keweenaw Waterway on 8 October 1906, while bound for Ashtabula, Ohio, from Superior, with a load of iron ore, in tow of the freighter Gladstone.			
Pearl B. Campbell	Wooden tug	1883	1895	United States				
Peninsula	Wooden steamboat	1849	1854	United States		47.418333°N 88.295667°W		
Pretoria	Wooden schooner barge	1900	1905	United States	On September 1, 1905 the Pretoria left Superior, Wisconsin with a load of iron ore bound for Chicago, Illinois. While sailing off Outer Island, her steering gear failed, and the towline connecting her to her towing steamer broke. The Pretoria drifted towards Outer Islands; eventually sinking with the loss of 5 lives. Listed on the National Register of Historic Places in 1994.	47°05.22′N 90°23.40′W		
Prindoc	Steel bulk freighter	1901	1943	Canada				
Prussia	Wooden steamer	1873	1885	Canada	On September September 11, 1885 the Prussia left Port Arthur, Ontario for Duluth, Minnesota where she would load grain bound for Montreal, Quebec. While passing the Apostle Islands, the winds started to pick up, so the Prussia's Captain decided to seek shelter on the lee side of Sand Island. On the morning of September 12, 1885, the Prussia's Captain discovered a fire which apparently started under the boilers. The fire spread quickly, and she quickly burned to the waterline. Her crew of 11 was rescued by the keeper of the Sand Island Light.			
Rappahannock	Wooden bulk freighter	1895	1911	United States		48.816110°N 86.958675°W		
Rebel	Wooden tug	1871	1898	United States				
R. F. Goodman	Wooden tug	1882	1898	United States				
R. G. Stewart	Wooden steamer	1878	1899	United States	On June 3, 1899 while carrying passengers, livestock and freight from Ontonagon, Michigan to Duluth, Minnesota, the R.G. Stewart ran aground on Michigan Island in a heavy fog. The next day while trying to get free, she caught fire and burned to the waterline with the loss of one of her crew. Listed on the National Register of Historic Places in 1991.	46°52.24′N 90°28.30′W		
R. Hallaran	Wooden schooner barge	1880	1900	United States				
Roanoke	Wooden package freighter	1867	1894	United States				
Robert L. Fryer	Wooden bulk freighter	1888	1930	Canada		48.364411°N 89.141567°W		
Robert Wallace	Wooden bulk freighter	1882	1902	United States	On November 17, 1902 the Robert Wallace left Superior, Wisconsin with a cargo of iron ore. When she was about 7 miles off Knife River, Minnesota, the Wallace sprang a leak and eventually sank with no fatalities. Wreck located in 2006, and listed on the National Register of Historic Places in 2009.	46°50.50′N 91°43.44′W		
Sagamore	Whaleback barge	1892	1901	United States		46.518083°N 84.63225°W		
Samuel Mather	Wooden bulk freighter	1887	1891	United States		46.5718°N 84.705417°W		
Samuel P. Ely	Wooden schooner	1869	1896	United States	On October 30, 1896 while heading to Two Harbors, Minnesota the Ely, her towing steamer the Hesper and another barge, the Negaunee were caught by a storm. When they reached Two Harbors, Minnesota, the towline to the Ely was cast off, and she wedged herself against the breakwater and eventually sank with no fatalities. Listed on the National Register of Historic Places in 1992.	47°0.42′N 91°40.40′W		
Satellite	Wooden tug	1864	1879	United States		46.937167°N 85.522833°W		
Scotia	Iron package freighter	1873	1884	United States		47.431167°N 87.704833°W		
Scotiadoc	Steel bulk freighter	1904	1953	Canada		48.253139°N 88.905333°W		
Servia	Wooden bulk freighter	1888	1898	United States				
Sevona	Steel bulk freighter	1890	1905	United States	On September 1, 1905 the Sevona left Superior, Wisconsin with a load of iron ore bound for Erie, Pennsylvania. On the morning of September 2, 1905, she ran hard aground on Sand Island Shoal off York Island and sank with the loss of 7 lives. Listed on the National Register of Historic Places in 1993.	47°00.24′N 90°54.32′W		
Sitka	Wooden bulk freighter	1887	1904	United States		46.681167°N 86.150000°W		
Smith Moore	Wooden bulk freighter	1880	1889	United States		46.4555°N 86.617667°W		
Sophie's Wreck	Wooden tug				Unidentified tugboat discovered by a girl skating on ice in 2007. Wreck might be the remains of the tug Amethyst that burned in 1888.	46°45.461′N 92°04.411′W		
South Shore	Wooden package freighter	1899	1912	United States				
Sovereign	Wooden steam barge	1873	1891	Canada				
S. R. Kirby	Composite bulk freighter	1890	1916	United States		47.48°N 88.25°W		
St. Andrew	Wooden steam barge	1885	1900	Canada				
Starlight	Wooden schooner	Before 1880	1880	United States				
Starrucca	Wooden package freighter	1875	1888	United States		46.685100°N 85.808500°W		
St. Clair	Wooden steam barge	1867	1876	United States	Burned and sank off Eagle River, Michigan, on 9 July 1876, while carrying cattle and general merchandise, killing 24 people.			
Steelvendor	Steel canaller	1923	1942	United States				
Strathmore	Wooden package freighter	1871	1906	Canada		47.74555°N 85.952133°W		
Sunbeam	Wooden paddle steamer	1861	1863	United States				
Superior	Wooden paddle steamer	1845	1856	United States		46.557500°N 86.415167°W		
Superior City	Steel bulk freighter	1898	1920	United States		46.724617°N 84.8739°W		
T. H. Camp	Wooden fish tug	1876	1900	United States	On November 16, 1900 the T. H. Camp sank between Basswood Island and Madeline Island, due to being overloaded with logging equipment. Wreck located in 1991, and listed on the National Register of Historic Places in 2004.	46°49.00′N 90°45.00′W		
Theano	Steel ocean freighter	1889	1906	United Kingdom		48.2916262°N 88.8700463°W		
Thomas Friant	Wooden fish tug	1884	1924	United States	On December 6, 1924 the Thomas Friant left Port Wing, Wisconsin to go gillnetting in the middle of Lake Superior. After seeking shelter in Squaw Bay for the night, she froze in. In the morning she broke free, but the ice cut her hull. She then tried to reach the north shore of the lake, because the south shore was completely frozen over. When she was about 12 miles south of Two Harbors, Minnesota, she sank with no fatalities. Wreck located in 2004, and listed on the National Register of Historic Places in 2019.	46°52.0′N 91°29.0′W		
Thomas Wilson	Steel whaleback freighter	1892	1902	United States	On June 7, 1902 the Thomas Wilson left Duluth Harbor in Duluth, Minnesota with a cargo of iron ore, when she was rammed by the wooden freighter George Hadley. The Wilson rolled over to port, righted herself and sank with the loss of 9 lives. Listed on the National Register of Historic Places in 1992.	46°47.0′N 92°4.10′W		
Thomas W. Palmer	Composite bulk freighter	1889	1905	United States				
Timber Slip Barge	Crane barge	c. 1906	2012	United States		46°46′23.1″N 92°06′24.8″W		
Tioga	Iron package freighter	1884	1919	United States		47.437667°N 88.270333°W		
Tom Boy	Wooden schooner	1863	1880	United States				
Transport	Iron barge	1880	1942	United States		47.470017°N 88.112500°W		
Traveller	Wooden paddle steamer	1852	1865	United States		47.458667°N 88.151333°W		
Uarda	Iron yacht	1881	1913	United States		47.123667°N 88.588500°W		
Union	Wooden steam barge	1861	1873	United States		46.670000°N 86.163333°W		
USS Essex	Wooden steam sloop	1874	1931	United States	Abandoned and burned near Duluth, Minnesota in 1931. Listed on the National Register of Historic Places in 1994.	46°42.46′N 92°01.43′W		
Vernon	Wooden fish tug	1932	1950	United States				
V. H. Ketchum	Wooden barge	1874	1905	United States				
Vienna	Wooden bulk freighter	1873	1892	United States		46.740267°N 84.96545°W		
Wasaga	Wooden package freighter	1876	1910	Canada		47.470333°N 87.882167°W		
Western Reserve	Steel bulk freighter	1890	1892	United States		47.224722°N 86.043056°W		
William C. Moreland	Steel bulk freighter	1910	1910	United States		47.41745°N 88.323683°W		
William F. Sauber	Wooden bulk freighter	1891	1903	United States				
Winslow	Wooden steamer	1863	1891	United States	Burned to the waterline on October 3, 1891 in Duluth, Minnesota.	46°44.03′N 92°09.16′W		
Wood Island	Wooden tug	1907	1922	United States				
Yosemite	Wooden steam barge	1867	1892	United States		46.521233°N 85.039017°W		
Zillah	Wooden bulk freighter	1890	1926	United States		46.728283°N 84.91585°W		

== See also ==
- List of shipwrecks on the Great Lakes
- List of Great Lakes shipwrecks on the National Register of Historic Places
- List of shipwrecks in the Thunder Bay National Marine Sanctuary

== Bibliography ==
- Kohl, Cris (2008). The Great Lakes Diving Guide (2nd ed.). West Chicago: Seawolf Communications. ISBN 978-0-9679-9769-8.
