= National Register of Historic Places listings in Lake County, Minnesota =

Location of Lake County in Minnesota

This is a list of the National Register of Historic Places listings in Lake County, Minnesota. It is intended to be a complete list of the properties and districts on the National Register of Historic Places in Lake County, Minnesota, United States. The locations of National Register properties and districts for which the latitude and longitude coordinates are included below, may be seen in an online map.

There are 22 properties and districts listed on the National Register in the county, including one National Historic Landmark.

This National Park Service list is complete through NPS recent listings posted August 1, 2025.

== Current listings ==
	Name on the Register	Image	Date listed	Location	City or town	Description
1	Benjamin Noble (Shipwreck)	Benjamin Noble (Shipwreck)	September 20, 2007 (#07000984)	8 miles at 118° from Knife Island; 46°56′00″N 91°40′00″W	Knife River	1909 steel bulk freighter steamship, sank in 1914.
2	Bridge No. 3589-Silver Creek Township	Bridge No. 3589-Silver Creek Township	June 29, 1998 (#98000686)	Minnesota State Highway 61 over the Stewart River; 47°02′52″N 91°37′51″W	Silver Creek Township vicinity	1924 reinforced concrete highway bridge noted for its unusually elaborate Neoclassical detailing in a rural setting, which was retained in a sympathetic 1939 widening.
3	Duluth and Iron Range Railroad Company Depot	Duluth and Iron Range Railroad Company Depot	February 24, 1983 (#83000910)	6th St. off South Ave. 47°01′08″N 91°40′12″W	Two Harbors	Large 1907 train station, symbolizing the key role of the Duluth and Iron Range Railroad in establishing Two Harbors as a link between northern Minnesota's iron and lumber fields and Lake Superior. Now a museum.
4	John Dwan Office Building	John Dwan Office Building	June 11, 1992 (#92000700)	201 Waterfront Dr. 47°01′15″N 91°40′16″W	Two Harbors	1898 office building associated with the early years of major international corporation 3M, being the site where the company was chartered in 1902 and headquartered from 1903 to 1916. Now a museum.
5	Edna G (tugboat)	Edna G (tugboat)	June 5, 1975 (#75002144)	Home port at the southern end of Poplar St. in Agate Bay; 47°01′00″N 91°40′21″W	Two Harbors	Tugboat in operation 1896–1981 to guide ore ships into harbor, nominated as a very long-serving Great Lakes vessel. Now a museum ship.
6	Gooseberry Falls State Park CCC/WPA/Rustic Style Historic Resources	Gooseberry Falls State Park CCC/WPA/Rustic Style Historic Resources	October 25, 1989 (#89001672)	Off Minnesota State Highway 61 northeast of Two Harbors; 47°08′29″N 91°27′33″W	Two Harbors vicinity	88 park facilities built 1933–41, significant as examples of New Deal federal work relief, strategic recreational development around a scenic resource, and National Park Service rustic architecture (with especially fine masonry).
7	Halfway Ranger Station	Halfway Ranger Station	November 8, 2011 (#11000782)	Minnesota State Highway 1; 47°48′49″N 91°44′16″W	Fall Lake Township	U.S. Forest Service complex with 12 contributing properties built 1931–1957 (seven by the CCC); an administrative and later research center also noted for its trademark use of fine rustic architecture. Now the Kawishiwi Field Laboratory.
8	Harriet B. (shipwreck)	Harriet B. (shipwreck)	August 9, 2018 (#100002773)	Four miles off Two Harbors; 46°57′21″N 91°37′54″W	Two Harbors vicinity	Highly intact wreck of an 1895 wooden railcar ferry sunk in 1922, a rare example of a vessel type crucial to the Lake Superior lumber industry.
9	Hesper Shipwreck Site	Hesper Shipwreck Site	April 14, 1994 (#94000343)	Along the west breakwall in Silver Bay Harbor. 47°16′17″N 91°16′18″W	Silver Bay vicinity	Well-preserved wreck of a bulk freight steamship, associated with the Great Lakes iron-ore and grain trades. Launched in 1890 and sunk in a 1905 spring storm.
10	Isabella Ranger Station	Isabella Ranger Station	February 1, 2006 (#05001611)	9420 Minnesota State Highway 1; 47°37′06″N 91°22′39″W	Isabella vicinity	Long-serving Superior National Forest district office with 11 contributing properties built 1934–1935, exemplifying federal land management, New Deal work relief, and such properties' trademark rustic architecture.
11	Kawishiwi Lodge	Kawishiwi Lodge	January 4, 2021 (#100005995)	3187 Fernberg Rd. 47°56′34″N 91°27′54″W	Fall Lake Township	Small, family-owned lake resort established in 1924, with 20 contributing properties. A rare surviving example of a once-common Minnesota attraction; also noted for its landscape architecture and association with the Wilderness Act of 1964.
11	Lake County Courthouse and Sheriff's Residence	Lake County Courthouse and Sheriff's Residence	February 24, 1983 (#83000912)	601 3rd Ave. 47°01′20″N 91°40′17″W	Two Harbors	Queen Anne sheriff's residence/jail built circa 1887 and Beaux-Arts courthouse built in 1906, long-serving seats of Lake County government and representative examples of two eras of public architecture.
12	Larsmont School	Larsmont School	June 18, 1992 (#92000799)	County Highway 61; 46°58′52″N 91°44′39″W	Larsmont	1914 school, focal point of a community formed in the early 20th century by immigrants from Finland's ethnic Swedish minority.
13	Madeira (Schooner-Barge) Shipwreck	Madeira (Schooner-Barge) Shipwreck	July 23, 1992 (#92000843)	Near the base of Gold Rock; 47°12′22″N 91°21′29″W	Beaver Bay vicinity	Only known remains of a schooner-barge, a little-known ship type with sails to aid its tow vessel. Launched in 1900 and wrecked during the infamous Mataafa Storm of 1905, prompting construction of the Split Rock Lighthouse nearby.
14	Edward and Lisa Mattson House and Fish House	Edward and Lisa Mattson House and Fish House	August 9, 1990 (#90001152)	Off Minnesota State Highway 61 at the Beaver Bay shore near Wieland Island; 47°16′02″N 91°16′57″W	East Beaver Bay	House dating to 1902 and fish house built circa 1930, two of the few surviving buildings associated with the small, family-owned outfits that pioneered commercial fishing on the North Shore.
15	Niagara Shipwreck Site	Niagara Shipwreck Site	April 14, 1994 (#94000344)	500 feet (150 m) south of Knife Island; 46°56′45″N 91°46′16″W	Knife River vicinity	Rare, early remnants of a class of large tugboats built for timber rafting on the Great Lakes. Launched in 1872 and sank in 1904 after running aground.
16	Onoko (Bulk Freight Steamer) Shipwreck	Onoko (Bulk Freight Steamer) Shipwreck	July 23, 1992 (#92000845)	13.5 miles (21.7 km) east of Duluth and 6.5 miles (10.5 km) south of Knife Island; 46°50′46″N 91°46′38″W	Knife River	1882 iron-hulled steamship, prototype of the large Great Lakes bulk freighters that became critical to the steel industry. Sprang a leak and sank in 1915.
17	Samuel P. Ely Shipwreck	Samuel P. Ely Shipwreck	June 18, 1992 (#92000694)	Along Two Harbors' west breakwall 47°00′42″N 91°40′40″W	Two Harbors vicinity	Lake Superior's best remnant of the large ore schooners introduced around 1870, and a key part of local nautical lore for wrecking against the Two Harbors breakwater followed by the dramatic rescue of all hands in an 1896 storm.
18	Split Rock Lighthouse	Split Rock Lighthouse	June 23, 1969 (#69000073)	About 20 miles northeast of Two Harbors on Minnesota State Highway 61; 47°12′00″N 91°22′01″W	Two Harbors vicinity	Clifftop lighthouse complex built 1909–10, significant for its association with the development of commercial shipping on the Great Lakes and the rare integrity of its 12 contributing properties. Now a museum. Declared a National Historic Landmark in 2011.
19	Tettegouche Camp Historic District	Tettegouche Camp Historic District	January 17, 1989 (#88003084)	Off County Highway 4; 47°20′50″N 91°15′38″W	Silver Bay vicinity	Remote, private resort complex with 11 contributing properties mostly built 1910–1925, representative of northern Minnesota's early-20th-century resort industry and its Rustic architecture.
20	Two Harbors Carnegie Library	Two Harbors Carnegie Library	July 31, 1986 (#86002121)	4th Ave. and Waterfront Dr. 47°01′21″N 91°40′15″W	Two Harbors	1909 Carnegie library, home of a public institution founded in 1896 and Lake County's only public library until 1955. Also associated with a local construction boom and the work of Duluth architect Austin Terryberry.
21	Two Harbors Light Station	Two Harbors Light Station	July 19, 1984 (#84001483)	Agate and Burlington Bays; 47°00′50″N 91°39′50″W	Two Harbors	1892 lighthouse—oldest still operating on the North Shore—which made Two Harbors the initial primary Lake Superior ore port. Now a Lake County Historical Society museum and bed & breakfast.

== See also ==
- List of National Historic Landmarks in Minnesota
- National Register of Historic Places listings in Minnesota
