= SS Robert Wallace =

Wooden steamship wrecked in Lake Superior in 1902

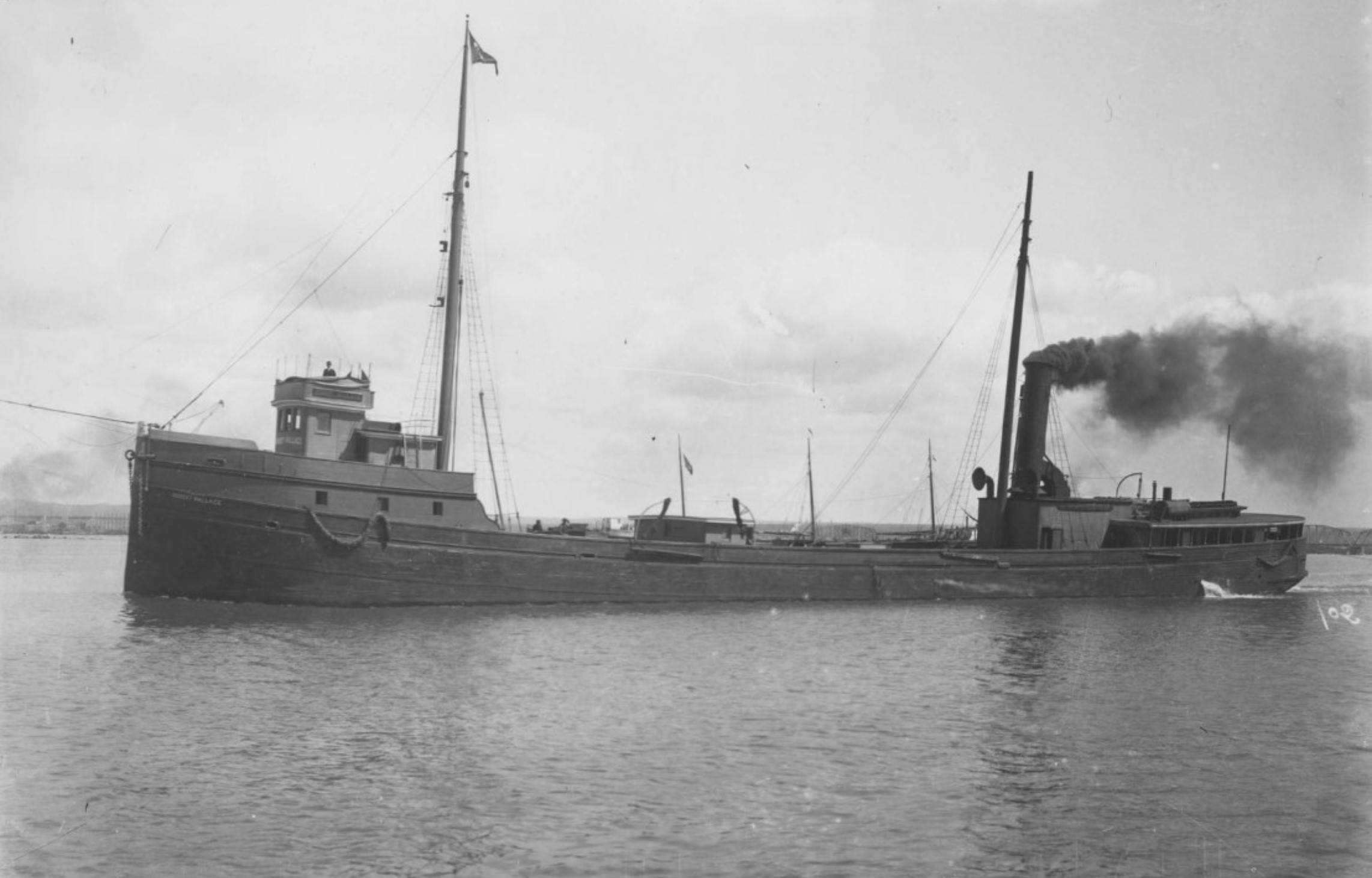
- The Robert Wallace underway

History

United States
- Name: Robert Wallace
- Operator: David Wallace 1882–1899; James Corrigan 1899–1900; Wickliffe Transit Company 1900–1902
- Port of registry: United States
- Builder: William H. Radcliffe
- Launched: April 13, 1882
- Completed: 1882
- In service: April 26, 1882
- Out of service: November 17, 1902
- Identification: U.S. Registry #110518
- Fate: Sprang a leak and sank on Lake Superior on November 17, 1902 with no loss of life

General characteristics
- Type: Bulk Freighter
- Tonnage: 1,189.56 GRT; 905.38 NRT
- Length: 220 feet (67 m)
- Beam: 36 feet (11 m)
- Height: 19.6 feet (6.0 m)
- Installed power: 1 × Scotch marine boiler
- Propulsion: 550 horsepower compound steam engine

National Register of Historic Places data
Robert Wallace (bulk carrier) shipwreck site
U.S. National Register of Historic Places
Location within Minnesota Location within the United States
Location	7 miles (11 km) south of Knife River, Minnesota
Coordinates	46°50.819′N 91°43.729′W
MPS	Minnesota's Lake Superior Shipwrecks MPS
NRHP reference No.	09000828
Added to NRHP	October 14, 2009

SS Robert Wallace was a wooden-hulled American bulk freighter that served on the Great Lakes of North America from her construction in 1882 to her sinking in 1902 on Lake Superior near the town of Palmers, St. Louis County, Minnesota, United States. On November 17, 1902, shortly after leaving Superior, Wisconsin, with a cargo of iron ore, Robert Wallace sprang a leak and sank. Her wreck was found in 2006, and on October 14, 2009, the wreck of Robert Wallace was listed in the National Register of Historic Places.

== History ==
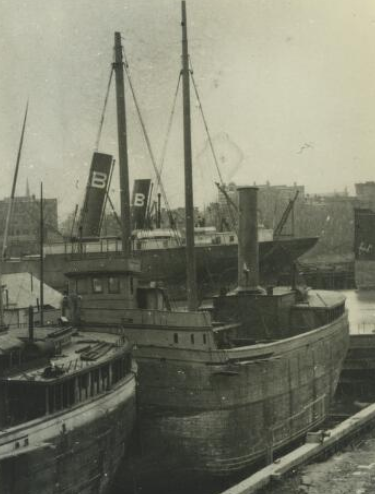
Robert Wallace in dry dock

Robert Wallace (Official number 110518) was built in 1882 by William H. Radcliffe of Cleveland, Ohio, for David Wallace of Lorain, Ohio. Her homeport was Lorain. She had a length of 220 feet (67 m), a beam of 36 feet (11 m), and she had a 19.6-foot (6.0 m) depth. She was powered by a small 550 horsepower compound steam engine and fueled by a single coal-fired Scotch marine boiler. She had a gross tonnage of 1189.56 tons and a net tonnage of 905.38 tons. She was launched at 2:30P.M. on April 13, 1882. She usually carried bulk cargoes such as iron ore, coal and grain.

On August 2, 1883, Robert Wallace was towing the schooner barge J.M. Hill when she and J.M. Hill were struck by lightning in the Milwaukee harbour. Both the Robert Wallace and the J.M. Hill had their foremasts heavily damaged.

On November 18, 1886, Robert Wallace was towing her schooner barge David Wallace (which was named after Robert Wallace's brother) when she stranded near Marquette, Michigan. Robert Wallace eventually caught fire and burned down. This incident almost ended her career but she was pulled off and repaired.

On November 12, 1891, Robert Wallace ran aground because of low water in the Sheboygan Harbor. She was loaded with a cargo of coal at the time of the incident. She was also towing David Wallace which was carrying 1,500 tons of coal and also ran aground.

On October 22, 1896, the boilers of Robert Wallace started to leak and they needed to be repaired so that she could continue her journey. She was repaired in Harbor Beach, Michigan.

== Sinking ==
On November 17, 1902, Robert Wallace departed the ore docks in Superior, Wisconsin laden with a cargo of iron ore. She was also towing the schooner barge Ashland, which was also full of iron ore. About four hours after their departure Robert Wallace sprang a leak and started sinking. Accounts differ on what caused the leak. Some accounts claim that Robert Wallace struck a floating log, others claim Ashland pulled off her stern post. Her crew was transferred to Ashland which then sailed to Two Harbors, Minnesota, and was towed to safety by the steel hulled tug Edna G. Even though Robert Wallace was loaded with iron she sank quite slowly. Hours after her crew abandoned her, Robert Wallace continued to float on the surface of Lake Superior with her lights still on. Even when she sank her pilothouse broke off and continued to float on the surface.

== Robert Wallace wreck ==
=== Discovery ===
The remains of Robert Wallace remained undiscovered until 2006 when an unidentified diver discovered the wreck near the shipping lanes. The diver reported the location of her wreck to diver Jay Hanson, who conducted a dive with wreck hunter Ken Merryman in 2006; in 2007 Hanson and Merryman captured video footage of the wreck. Later, Merryman and diver Bob Olson identified her wreck after seeing her name, still painted in white lettering on her stern.

=== Robert Wallace today ===
The wreck of Robert Wallace rests relatively intact in 240 feet (73 m) of water about seven miles (11 km) south of Knife River, Minnesota. Close by are the wrecks of several ships including the wreck of the iron hulled steamer Onoko, the steel hulled package freighter Benjamin Noble, and the wooden hulled rafting tug Niagara, all of which are listed on the National Register of Historic Places. The wreck of Robert Wallace is the most intact known wooden-hulled bulk freighter in Minnesota waters. (Note: While Robert Wallace is the most intact known wooden bulk freighter in Minnesota waters, the wooden barge Harriet B. (also listed on the National Register of Historic Places) is much more intact.) Her hull is separated about 35 to 40 feet (11 to 12 m) at the stem, which makes exploring her wreck easier. Numerous artifacts lie outside the wreck; it is illegal to remove any artifacts because she is protected by the state of Minnesota. Her stern, however, remains intact, disproving the theory that Ashland pulled off her stern post.

The wreck was listed on the National Register of Historic Places in 2009 for its state-level significance in the themes of commerce, engineering, historical archaeology, and maritime history. It was nominated for its significant research potential on the formative design and shipboard life of the first lake freighters.
