= Thomas Friant =

Wooden-hulled fish tug

Coordinates: 46.866667°N 91.483333°W

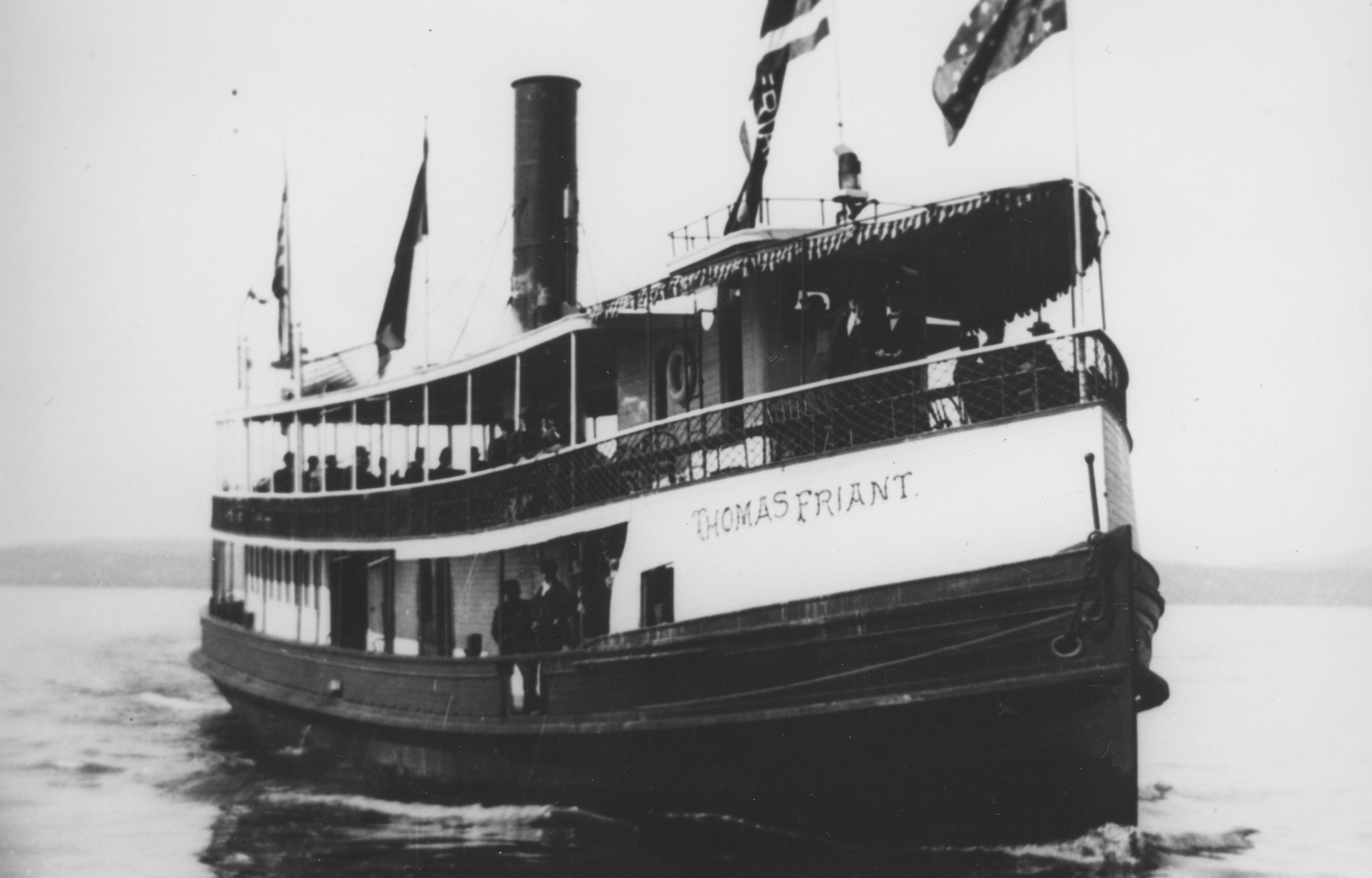
- Thomas Friant as a ferry

History

United States
- Name: Thomas Friant
- Owner: Einer Miller & Halvor Reiten
- Port of registry: United States, Duluth, Minnesota
- Builder: Duncan Robertson
- In service: 1884
- Out of service: 1924
- Identification: US registry 145380
- Fate: Holed by ice, and sank on Lake Superior

General characteristics
- Tonnage: 81.42 GRT; 46.20 NRT
- Length: 96 ft (29 m)
- Beam: 18.25 ft (5.56 m)
- Depth: 7.66 ft (2.33 m)
- Installed power: 1 × firebox boiler
- Propulsion: 315 hp (235 kW) compound steam engine

National Register of Historic Places data
THOMAS FRIANT shipwreck (gill net tug)
U.S. National Register of Historic Places
Location within Wisconsin Location within the United States
| Location | 13 miles (21 km) southeast of Two Harbors, Minnesota |
| Nearest city | Port Wing, Wisconsin |
| Coordinates |
| Built | 1884 |
| Architect | Duncan Robertson |
| MPS | Great Lakes Shipwreck Sites of Wisconsin MPS |
| NRHP reference No. | 100004627 |
| Added to NRHP | November 18, 2019 |

Thomas Friant was a wooden-hulled ferry (later fish tug) that served on the Great Lakes from her construction in 1884 to her sinking in 1924. In January 1924, while gillnetting out of Two Harbors, Minnesota in Lake Superior, she was holed by ice, and sank with no fatalities. In 2004 her wreck was discovered in over 300 feet (91 m) of water in pristine condition. The wreck of Thomas Friant was listed on the National Register of Historic Places in 2019.

== History ==
=== Construction ===
Thomas Friant was built as a ferry in 1884 by Duncan Robertson in Grand Haven, Michigan for Reuben & Ralph Vanderhoef, also of Grand Haven. Her wooden hull was 96 feet (29 m) long, her beam was 18.25 feet (5.56 m) wide (some sources state the width as 18.30 feet (5.58 m)), and her hull was 7.66 feet (2.33 m) deep (some sources state her hull's depth as 7.80 feet (2.38 m)). She had a gross register tonnage of 81.42 tons, and a net register tonnage of 46.20 tons. She was powered by a 315 horsepower (235 kW), 18 x 20 high pressure compound steam engine built by the Grand Haven Engine Works of Grand Haven, that was fired by a single firebox boiler that was built by the Johnson Brothers of Ferrysburg, Michigan.

=== Service history ===
On July 21, 1884 Thomas Friant was enrolled at Grand Haven, and was given the official number #145380. She originally ran as a ferry on the Grand River in Grand Haven. She later started to run between the ports of Charlevoix, Michigan, Harbor Springs, Michigan and Waukegan, Illinois in Lake Michigan, transporting passengers and freight.

In 1890 Thomas Friant's homeport was changed to Harbor Springs, Michigan. In 1899 her homeport was changed to Marquette, Michigan. In 1899 Thomas Friant was sold to William H. Rowe & James McRae of Dollar Bay, Michigan.

In 1900 she started traveling the Keweenaw Waterway. In 1901 Thomas Friant had her lower decks closed-in in Calumet, Michigan. In 1903 she was bought by Charles A. Ripley, and was moved to Sault Ste. Marie, Michigan. In 1907 she was sold to Charles A. Ripley of Sault Ste. Marie. On December 22, 1908 while in winter layup in Sault Ste. Marie, Thomas Friant burned to the water's edge, and was removed from documentation on December 29, 1908. In 1911 she was rebuilt as a fish tug, and was sold to John, Henry & Thomas Hickler of Sault Ste. Marie. She was re-documented on May 15, 1911. In 1917 Thomas Friant was sold to Emil G. Endress of Sault Ste. Marie. in 1918 she was sold to Ora O. & Obline Endress of Sault Ste. Marie.

In 1923 she was sold to Einer Miller & Halvor Reiten of Bayfield, Wisconsin, and was re-registered to Duluth, Minnesota. During this time, Thomas Friant had her decks enclosed, and her pilothouse raised. Miller and Reiten originally intended to use her as a packet steamer, but ended up using her as just a fish tug.

=== Final voyage ===
On January 6, 1924, Thomas Friant left Port Wing, Wisconsin with Captain Einer Miller, Engineer Halvor Reiten and six commercial fishermen from Cornucopia, Wisconsin who hired Miller to take them to the south shore of Lake Superior to do some deep water fishing. The day was very cold, and the temperature eventually dropped below zero degrees, and a sheet of ice started forming over the lake. They eventually ended up taking shelter in Squaw Bay (a bay northwest of Cornucopia) for the night, but Thomas Friant froze in. Eventually, Thomas Friant broke free of the ice, but while she broke free, the ice punched a hole in her hull. They then started sailing up to the north end of Lake Superior, because the south shore was completely frozen over. Around 12 miles (19 km) south of Knife River, Minnesota, the water that was leaking into her hull extinguished her boiler, and she began to sink. The crew lowered a lifeboat and rowed safely to Knife River.

== Thomas Friant wreck ==
=== Discovery ===
In July 2004, while searching for the wreck of the bulk carrier Robert Wallace, shipwreck hunters Jerry Eliason, Ken Merryman, Kraig Smith and Randy Beebe found what they thought to be Robert Wallace 13 miles (21 km) southeast of Two Harbors, Minnesota, in about 300 feet (91 m) of water. Originally, the group thought Thomas Friant to be Robert Wallace because the camera they dropped over the wreck picked up images of the second and the third letters of the worn nameplate that looked like an R and an O. On August 1, 2004, the group anchored over the wreck again, and when the camera was sent down again, the wreck was this time identified as Thomas Friant.

=== Thomas Friant today ===
Thomas Friant rests upright and totally intact in 290 to 305 feet (88 to 93 m) of water. Her hull is embedded up to the propeller hub in mud. Her smokestack is upright, and there are still fish nets, and various tools on board. There is also a heavy layer of silt around the wreck which heavily impairs visibility.
