= SS Prindoc =

Several steamships have been named SS Prindoc including:

- SS Prindoc (1901), originally Gilchrist, a Canadian bulk freighter launched in 1901 and lost in 1943.
- SS Prindoc (1902), originally named Harold B. Nye, a Canadian bulk freighter launched in 1902 and scrapped in 1964.
