= SS Fedora =

Shipwreck in Lake Superior, Bayfield County, Wisconsin, United States

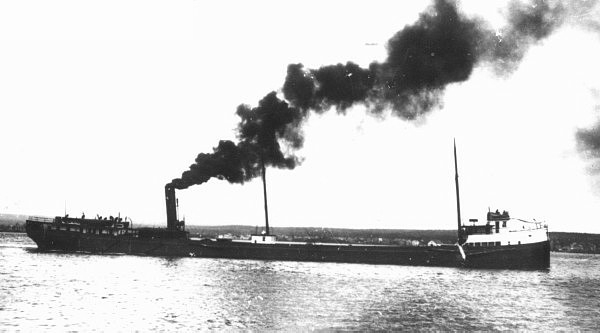
- Fedora underway

History

United States
- Name: Fedora
- Operator: Cowle Transportation Company (at time of loss)
- Builder: Frank W. Wheeler Shipbuilding Company
- Launched: 1889
- Completed: 1889
- In service: 1889–1901
- Out of service: September 20, 1901
- Identification: Registry no. 120746; Certificate of enrollment first issued Port Huron, May 6, 1889
- Fate: Destroyed by fire and beached off Red Cliff Bay, Lake Superior (September 20, 1901); machinery salvaged
- Notes: Composite construction (iron framing with oak planking); salvaged November 1901

General characteristics
- Type: Steam bulk freighter (steam screw)
- Tonnage: 1,848 GRT
- Length: 282.2 ft (86.0 m)
- Beam: 41.5 ft (12.6 m)
- Depth: 20.1 ft (6.1 m)
- Installed power: (reported ~900 hp)
- Propulsion: Triple expansion steam engine, single screw; two scotch boilers
- Capacity: Designed for bulk ore/cargo (light load aboard on final voyage)
- Crew: 17 (all survived)
- Notes: Wood hull with iron strapping; composite construction (iron keel, ribs and frame; oak planking).

SS Fedora was a large, composite-construction steam bulk carrier built in 1889 by the Frank W. Wheeler Shipbuilding Company at West Bay City, Michigan, and its shipwreck can be found in the Apostle Islands. The vessel measured about 282.2 ft (86.0 m) in length, with a beam of 41.5 ft (12.6 m) and a depth of hold of 20.1 ft (6.1 m), and her recorded gross tonnage was approximately 1,848. She was powered by a triple-expansion steam engine driving a single screw and fitted with two scotch boilers. The Fedora operated on the upper Great Lakes and was employed in bulk freighting, including iron ore and grain.

== Description ==
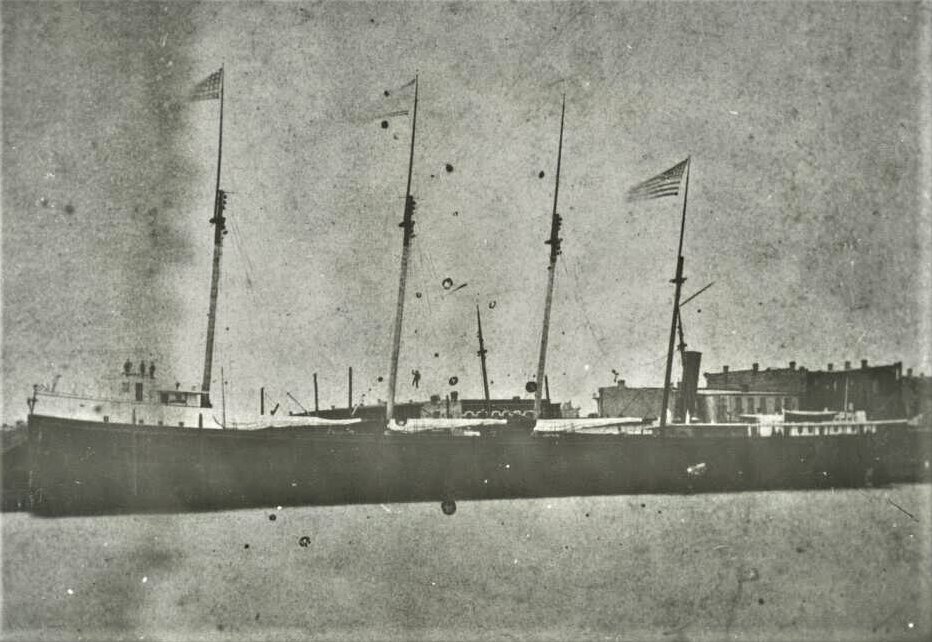
The Fedora

Fedora was built as a composite bulk freighter: iron keel, ribs and framing with oak planking fastened by bolts and iron strapping. Contemporary descriptions and surviving documentation note a large single-screw steam plant (triple-expansion engine) with two scotch boilers and an estimated power rating of roughly 900 horsepower. The ship had no masts listed in late registries and was intended as a powered bulk carrier for Great Lakes service.

== Service history ==
The Fedora was first enrolled at Port Huron, Michigan (certificate issued May 6, 1889) and was originally built for Fred McBrier and associates of Erie, Pennsylvania. Over her operational life she carried bulk cargoes on the upper lakes and is recorded as having been stranded briefly on May 29, 1900, near the Duluth lifesaving station during fog; a tug pulled her free. At the time of her loss she was owned by the Cowle Transportation Company (W. W. Brown, secretary) of Cleveland, Ohio.

== Final voyage and loss ==
On the night of September 20, 1901, Fedora departed Duluth bound for Ashland to take on a cargo of iron ore. While transiting the West Channel of the Apostle Islands between Basswood Island and Red Cliff Bay, a kerosene lamp (reported in contemporary and later accounts) fell or exploded in the engine room and ignited oil and other flammables stored there. The fire rapidly spread, engulfing the engine room and much of the superstructure; because the ship's firefighting gear and throttle controls were located in or adjacent to the engine room, efforts to fight the blaze and to control the vessel were severely hampered.

Captain Frank A. Frick steered the burning ship toward the shoreline and deliberately beached her on the sandbar near Chicago Creek north of Red Cliff Bay to enable the crew and passengers to abandon ship. All seventeen persons aboard (including officers and two passengers as reported by some accounts) reached shore safely in lifeboats before the vessel burned to the waterline. The Fedora was a constructive total loss; her certificate of enrollment was later surrendered (March 31, 1902) and much of her machinery and the two boilers were salvaged in subsequent months.

== Wreck site and condition ==
The remains of the Fedora lie in shallow water (reported historically at about 10 ft) off Red Cliff, Bayfield County, Wisconsin (approximate location N 46°51.602′ W 090°46.722′). The lower hull, burned on the starboard side to the bilge but surviving on the port side, rests on a silty, sandy bottom; portions of the hull and framing remain and several iron cross-braces and machinery beds are visible. The extant hull length has been measured at roughly 251 ft 4 in from sternpost to stem; the site has been heavily scavenged and many surface artifacts were removed during early salvage. A dive guide for the wreck has been published and the site is visited by local technical and shallow-water divers.

== Salvage and aftermath ==
After the loss the Fedora was sold (reported sale in November 1901) to local interests (Red Cliff Lumber Company or to another shipping concern in some reports) who salvaged the engine machinery and boilers. Contemporary insurance estimates placed the loss between US$80,000 and $90,000; the loss was covered by insurance according to period reporting and later summaries. The certificate of enrollment was formally surrendered in 1902.

== Legacy ==
The Fedora remains one of the better-documented shallow wrecks in the Apostle Islands / Bayfield area. Because the lower hull and framing survive above the lake bottom, the site is of interest to historians, archaeologists and divers studying composite-construction Great Lakes freighters of the late nineteenth century.

== See also ==
- List of shipwrecks in Lake Superior
