= Niagara (tug) =

Tugboat which worked in the Great Lakes

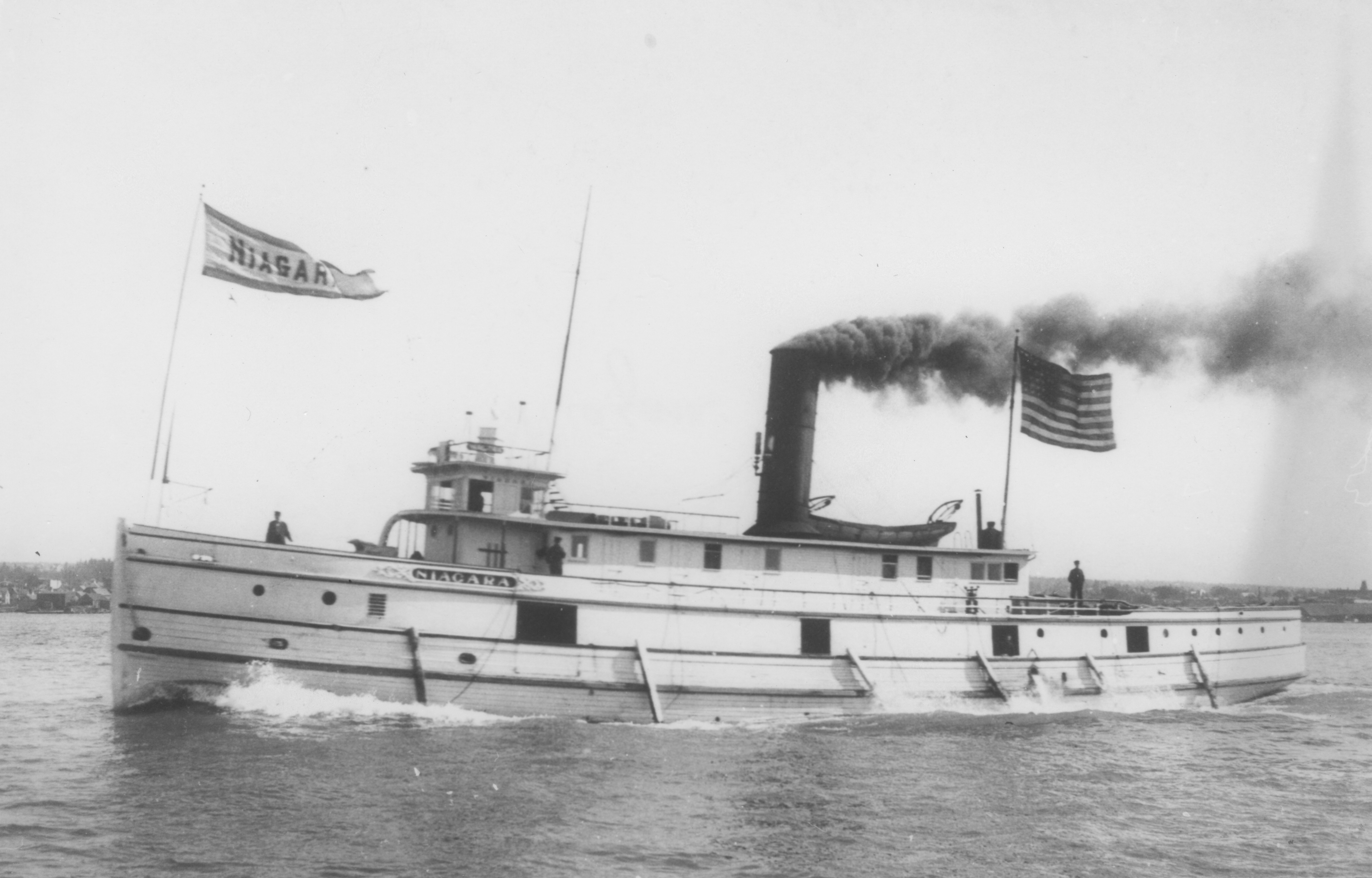
- The Niagara underway

History

United States
- Name: Niagara
- Builder: Detroit Dry Dock Company
- Launched: 1872
- In service: 1872
- Identification: U.S. Registry #18714
- Fate: Wrecked June 4, 1904

General characteristics
- Type: Tugboat
- Tonnage: 276.87 GRT; 183.05 NRT
- Length: 130 ft (40 m)
- Beam: 24.58 ft (7.49 m)
- Depth: 8.7 ft (2.7 m)
- Installed power: 560 hp (420 kW) fore and aft compound steam engine
- Niagara Shipwreck Site
- U.S. National Register of Historic Places
- Location within Minnesota Location within the United States
- Location: Lake County, Minnesota
- Nearest city: Duluth, Minnesota
- Coordinates: 46.945751°N 91.771245°W
- Built: 1872
- Architect: Detroit Dry Dock Company
- Architectural style: Tugboat
- MPS: Minnesota's Lake Superior Shipwrecks MPS
- NRHP reference No.: 94000344
- Added to NRHP: April 14, 1994

Niagara was a large wooden tugboat that sank on June 4, 1904, on Lake Superior near the town of Duluth, Lake County, Minnesota, after having run aground near Knife River. On April 14, 1994, the wreck of the Niagara was added to the National Register of Historic Places.

== History ==
The Niagara (official number 18714) was one of the large class of "outside" tugboats that were built for timber rafting on the Great Lakes. They were designed for the lumber industry which at the time was very large. She was built by the Detroit Dry Dock Company in 1872 as hull number #9.

She was 130 feet (40 m) long, her beam was 24.58 feet (7.49 m) wide and she had a depth of 8.7 feet (2.7 m). The vessel measured 276.87 gross register tons and 183.05 net register tons. The Niagara is significant because of her work in the Great Lakes lumber industry.

In 1889, the Niagara was rebuilt and had a new engine and machinery installed. Her new engine was a 56-horsepower fore and aft compound steam engine that had bores of 24 inches and 44 inches by 36 inch stroke. The new engine was built by the Frontier Engine Works Company of Detroit, Michigan. Her new Scotch marine boiler 13 feet (4.0 m) wide and 13 feet (4.0 m) high, and it was built by Thomas McGregor of Detroit, Michigan.

== Final voyage ==
On June 4, 1904, the Niagara was sailing from Sault Ste. Marie, Michigan, to Duluth, Minnesota, to tow some construction equipment owned by Hugo & Tims from Duluth, Minnesota, To Lake Huron. She was sailing in heavy weather when she ran aground on Knife Island. The crew of the Niagara claimed that the reason for their grounding was that their compass failed because it started detecting magnetic anomalies on the shoreline. Her captain ordered her engine to be reversed, but the strong winds and heavy seas drove her onto the rocks. Huge waves began to pound the Niagara; she began to break apart quickly. Distress calls that were being sent by the Niagara were heard in a village at the mouth of Knife River. The village's telegraph operator telegraphed the town of Two Harbors, Minnesota, to request assistance. The steel tug Edna G was sent to rescue her crew. She quickly arrived to assist the Niagara’s crew. The Edna G rescued the eleven crewmen and two passengers that were aboard. The only person who sustained an injury was Mrs. A. Merritt who cut her hand on a piece of broken glass while she was escaping her cabin.

On June 16, 1904, the Duluth Evening News reported that the Niagara was quickly stripped of her boiler, engine, machinery, and iron and steel work, then the pieces were placed the machinery in the Whitney Brothers’ dock in Duluth, Minnesota.

== Wreck of the Niagara ==
The wreck of the Niagara lies in four pieces on a rocky slope off Knife Island. The four sections of her hull include: her stem, her starboard side and keel, her port side and a detached section of her starboard side rail. There is no trace of her stern which means that either it was recovered during a salvage attempt, or it lies quite far away from the rest of the wreckage. There is also a small section of her deck is still attached to her port side. The Niagara is also a rare vessel because she is one of only two known rafting tugs in the Minnesota portion of Lake Superior, the other one being the Bob Anderson which was built in 1862.
