= SS Benjamin Noble =

Steel canaller lost with all hands on Lake Superior in 1914

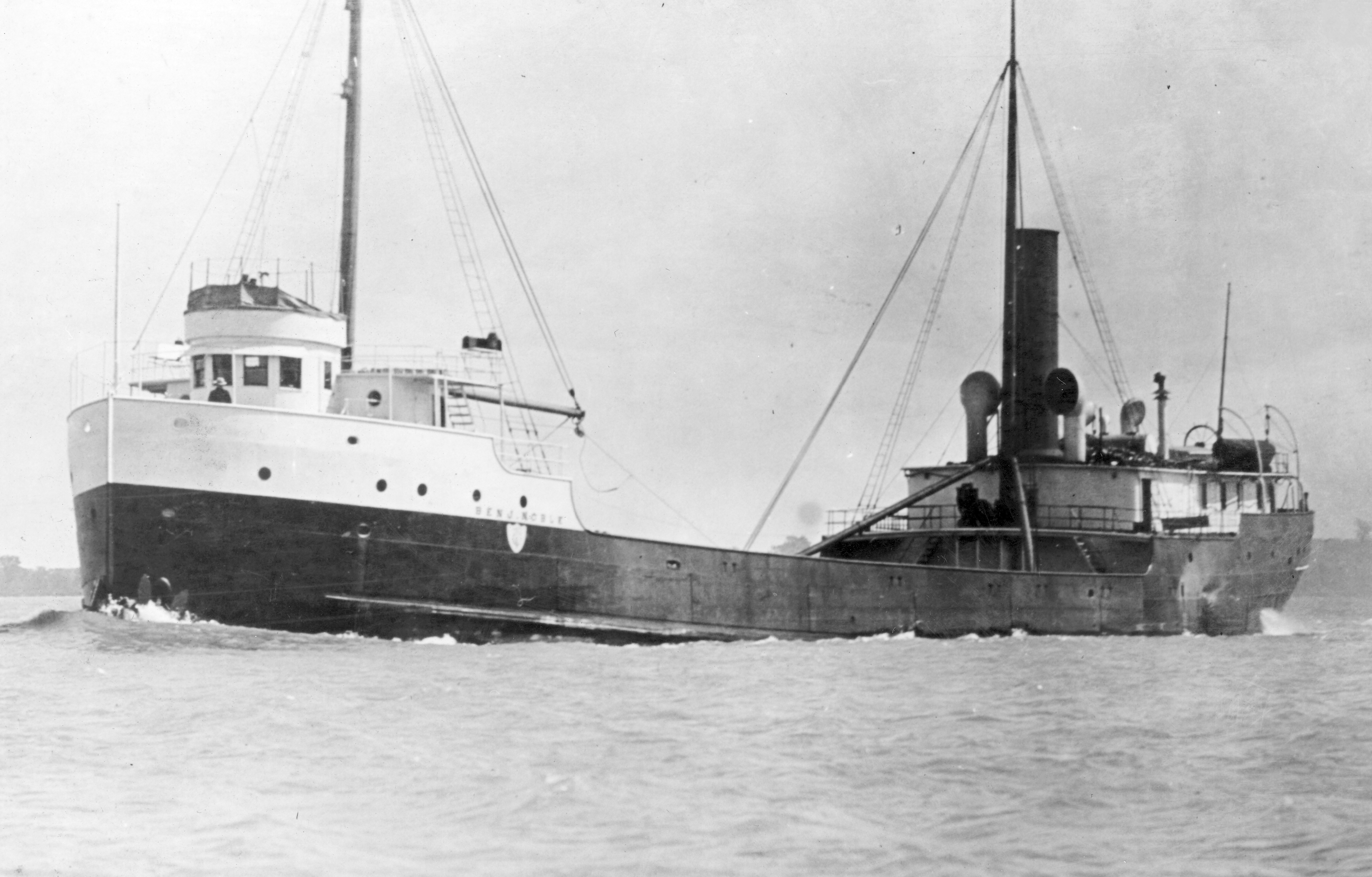
- The Benjamin Noble prior to her sinking

History

United States
- Name: Benjamin Noble
- Operator: Capitol Transportation Company
- Builder: Detroit Shipbuilding Company, Wyandotte, Michigan
- Yard number: 178
- Launched: April 28, 1909
- In service: 1909
- Out of service: 1914
- Home port: United States, Detroit, Michigan
- Identification: U.S Registry #206240
- Fate: Foundered April 28, 1914 off Knife River, Lake Superior

General characteristics
- Type: Canaller
- Tonnage: 1,481
- Length: 239 ft (73 m)
- Beam: 40 ft (12 m)
- Height: 18 ft (5.5 m)
- Propulsion: Triple-expansion steam engine
- Crew: 16
- BENJAMIN NOBLE (Shipwreck)
- U.S. National Register of Historic Places
- Location within Minnesota Location within the United States
- Location: Lake Superior near Knife River
- Nearest city: Duluth, Minnesota
- Coordinates: 46°56.00′N 91°40.00′W
- Built: 1909
- Architect: Detroit Shipbuilding Company
- Architectural style: Canaller
- NRHP reference No.: 07000984
- Added to NRHP: 2007

The SS Benjamin Noble was a lake freighter that operated on the Great Lakes. Built in 1909 by the Detroit Shipbuilding Company, she was 239 feet (73 m) in length and had a beam of 40 feet (12 m). She was built as a "canaller," a vessel designed for use in what were then the dimensions of the Welland Canal, but was converted by her owners for service in the open Great Lakes. Heavily laden and top-heavy with a cargo of railroad rails, she sank in a Lake Superior storm near Knife River, Minnesota, in April 1914 with the loss of all hands.

After more than 90 years as a ghost ship, the hulk of the Benjamin Noble was rediscovered in the autumn of 2004. The wreck was placed on the National Register of Historic Places in 2007 as NRHP site #07000984.

== Design ==
The Benjamin Noble was unique among Lake freighters because her stern cabins were elevated on a poop deck. Her bow cabins were also elevated on a forecastle deck. This also meant that she sat quite low in the water meaning that her spar deck often got wet. Maritime historian Dwight Boyer attributes the 1914 loss of the vessel to a combination of deliberate cargo overloading and the ship's unusual design. On her last voyage the low-riding vessel had very little freeboard and was vulnerable to swamping.

== Damaged 1912 ==
On October 14, 1912, the Benjamin Noble near Detroit struck and leaked; arrived October 20 Superior with 54 plates damaged (repaired)

== Wreck ==
The Duluth-bound Benjamin Noble entered Lake Superior on April 25, 1914, under command of Captain John Eisenhardt from Milwaukee, WI; the Noble was his first command. Also bound for Duluth was the lumber steamer Norwalk, which trailed the Noble and eventually passed her on the 27th. That night, however, a fierce spring gale hit the lake. The Noble was apparently following the Norwalk until around 3am when both ships were near Knife Island. At that time a passing freighter, the Daniel J. Morrell, noticed the lights of one of the ships suddenly disappear.

Had she been able to make anchor in the sheltered port of Duluth, the Benjamin Noble would have been saved. However, at a key moment in the storm, entry to the harbor was unnavigable after the obsolescent, kerosene-fueled south pier torch light blew out. Harbor laborer Stan Standen tried to reach the light to relight it, but was blown into the canal and lost.

The Norwalk struggled into Duluth harbor at 4:30am on April 28. That afternoon the hatch covers of the Noble were found washed up on the beach near Duluth. The next day more wreckage, including her pilot house, was found. On April 29, 1914 it was reported several crewmembers' remains were found on a sand reef near Minnesota Reef; this report was incorrect. In August 1915, a ship’s cook reported seeing a ship’s long spar (possibly from the Benjamin Noble) in Lake Superior, eight miles from Duluth on the North Shore near Knife River.

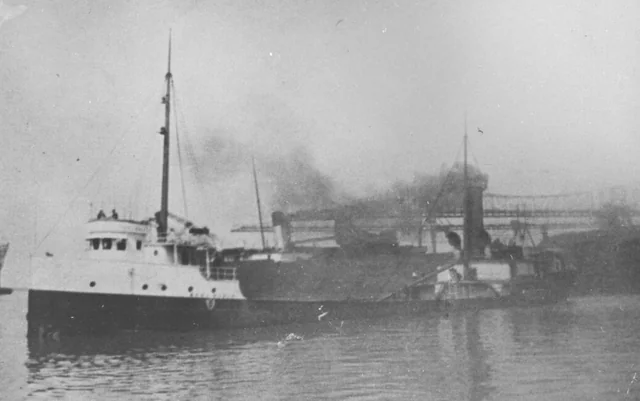
Reported Last Picture of Benjamin Noble April 1914

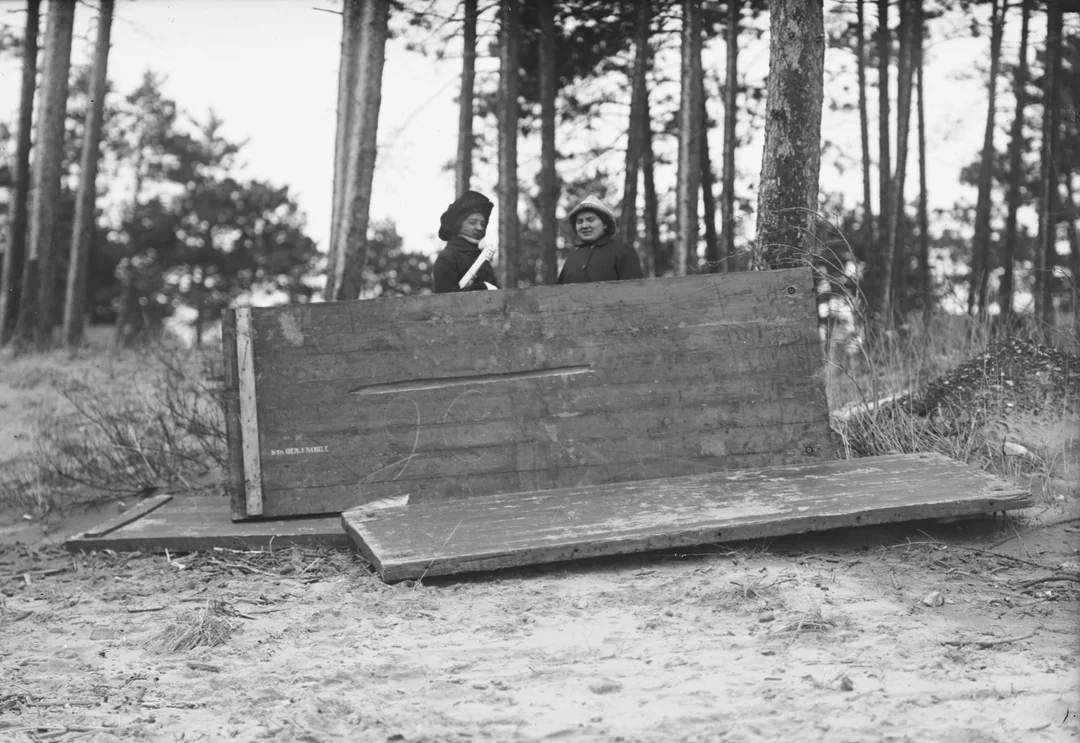
Deck covers from the Benjamin Noble April 1914

== Victims ==
This being the first trip of the season, the captain had not given a crew list. Of the estimated 16 to 18 to 20 crew members, the names of 13 are known with certitude, and an additional two names are known with probability.

Name	Rank	Notes
John Eisenhardt	Captain	from Milwaukee, Wisconsin
George R. Longley	Mate	from 1947 Whitney Avenue Niagara Falls, New York, was a resident of St. Catharines, Canada.
John Colnan	Steward	from Oswego, New York
Thomas Proud	Second Cook	from Oswego, New York
William Shaver	Helmsman	from St. Catharines, Canada
Alvin (A.C.) Coger	Chief Engineer	from Port Clinton, Ohio
Paul Bolaraski	2nd Engineer	from Oak Harbor, Ohio
Joel/Jed Coger	Oiler	from Port Clinton, Ohio, engaged to be married, brother of Alvin Coger
Frank Coger	Oiler	from Port Clinton, Ohio, son of Alvin Coger
William Goullett	Fireman	from Toledo, Ohio
Otto Guntch	Fireman	from Toledo, Ohio
Earl Crawford	Watchman	from Port Dalhousie, Canada
William Murray	Crewman	from St. Catharines, Canada
Frank Dessmore and his son		from Tonawanda, New York; Note they may or may not have been aboard the vessel[?]
5-7 other unidentified men	unknown	unknown

== Discovery ==
In the Autumn of 2004, a shipwreck research team consisting of Jerry Eliason, Kraig Smith, Ken Merryman and Randy Beebe were searching for the Robert Wallace when their side scan sonar picked up the outlines of a shipwreck. Randy Beebe described the event:

It was the last pass of the day, which was going to be the last day of the search season. We were just going to pull up the side-scan sonar and head in, and we noticed a target on the screen. So right away we headed over there and investigated it more with the side-scan sonar, and sure enough we had a shipwreck.

The team was expecting to see the Wallace, but the ship they found was made of steel. They were able to lower a camera into the cargo hold of the mystery ship. They saw the holds of railroad rails, thus confirming that the wreck was that of the long lost Benjamin Noble.

== Wreck condition ==
The Benjamin Noble was extensively damaged by the sinking. The ship lies upright in a trench made when it hit the lake bottom; the bow end is covered in silt. The aft half of the ship is buried almost up to the level of the main deck, with the hull split just forward of the boiler room. The rear cabins are collapsed due to the weight of water as the ship plunged quickly. The cargo hatches are gone, exposing the cargo of railroad rails. The rear mast has fallen, and scattered nearby are the ventilators and a lifeboat.

== See also ==
- List of shipwrecks in the Great Lakes
- National Register of Historic Places listings in Lake County, Minnesota
