= Isabella Ranger Station =

- U.S. National Register of Historic Places
- U.S. Historic district
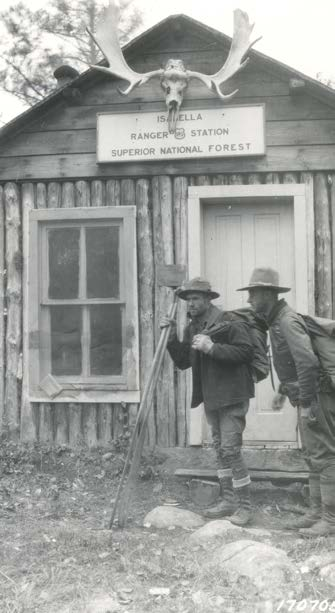
- Isabella Ranger Station circa 1924

- Location within Minnesota Location within the United States
- Nearest city: Isabella, Minnesota
- Coordinates: 47°38′50″N 91°27′32″W
- Area: 21.3 acres (8.6 ha)
- Built by: Civilian Conservation Corps
- Architectural style: Bungalow/Craftsman, Rustic architecture
- NRHP reference No.: 05001611
- Added to NRHP: February 1, 2006

The Isabella Ranger Station is a complex of 21 buildings in Stony River Township, Minnesota, United States, near the town of Isabella. It is located on Minnesota State Highway 1 about one mile east of Isabella. The complex is listed on the National Register of Historic Places for its association with New Deal federal relief construction.

Of the 21 buildings, 11 are listed as contributing properties to the district. These were built by the Civilian Conservation Corps in the mid-1930s and were built of horizontally-laid wood logs, mostly aspen and pine. These buildings consist of dwellings, an office building, storage facilities, and warehouses. Some other buildings on the site were constructed after the CCC built the original complex, and are not considered contributing properties.

The ranger station is nationally significant for its use as an administration center that supported multiple federal land management functions within the Isabella Ranger District of the Superior National Forest. The rustic architecture is also significant because it was common to the design of land management administrative buildings within this time period. The historic context of the Superior National Forest began with a recommendation by General C.C. Andrews that all of the public land within Cook County, Minnesota and Lake County, Minnesota, totaling around 500,000 acres (200,000 ha), should be preserved as a forest reserve. On February 13, 1909, President Theodore Roosevelt established the Superior National Forest with an area of 1,018,638 acres (412,228 ha). Additional proclamations raised the size of the forest to 2,173,210 acres (879,470 ha). During the Great Depression of the 1930s, the Civilian Conservation Corps was formed to provide relief for unemployment, and also to stimulate local economies through federally funded, grassroots development projects. The Isabella guard station served as a facility for crews that were working in an often roadless area within the Superior National Forest. While crews and their assignments changed frequently, CCC Company 701, based in Ely, Minnesota, and Company 3703, based in Baptism River, Minnesota were confirmed to be involved in the construction of this station.

Other surviving guard stations include the East Bearskin Lake Guard Station, near Gunflint; Crooked Lake Guard Station, near LaCroix; Halfway/North Central Experiment Station; Kekekabic Lake Guard Station; Lac LaCroix Guard Station; Sawbill Lake Guard Station; South Kawishiwi River Pavilion; and Tofte Ranger Station.
