= SS Prindoc (1901) =

Great Lakes freighter wrecked on Lake Superior in 1943

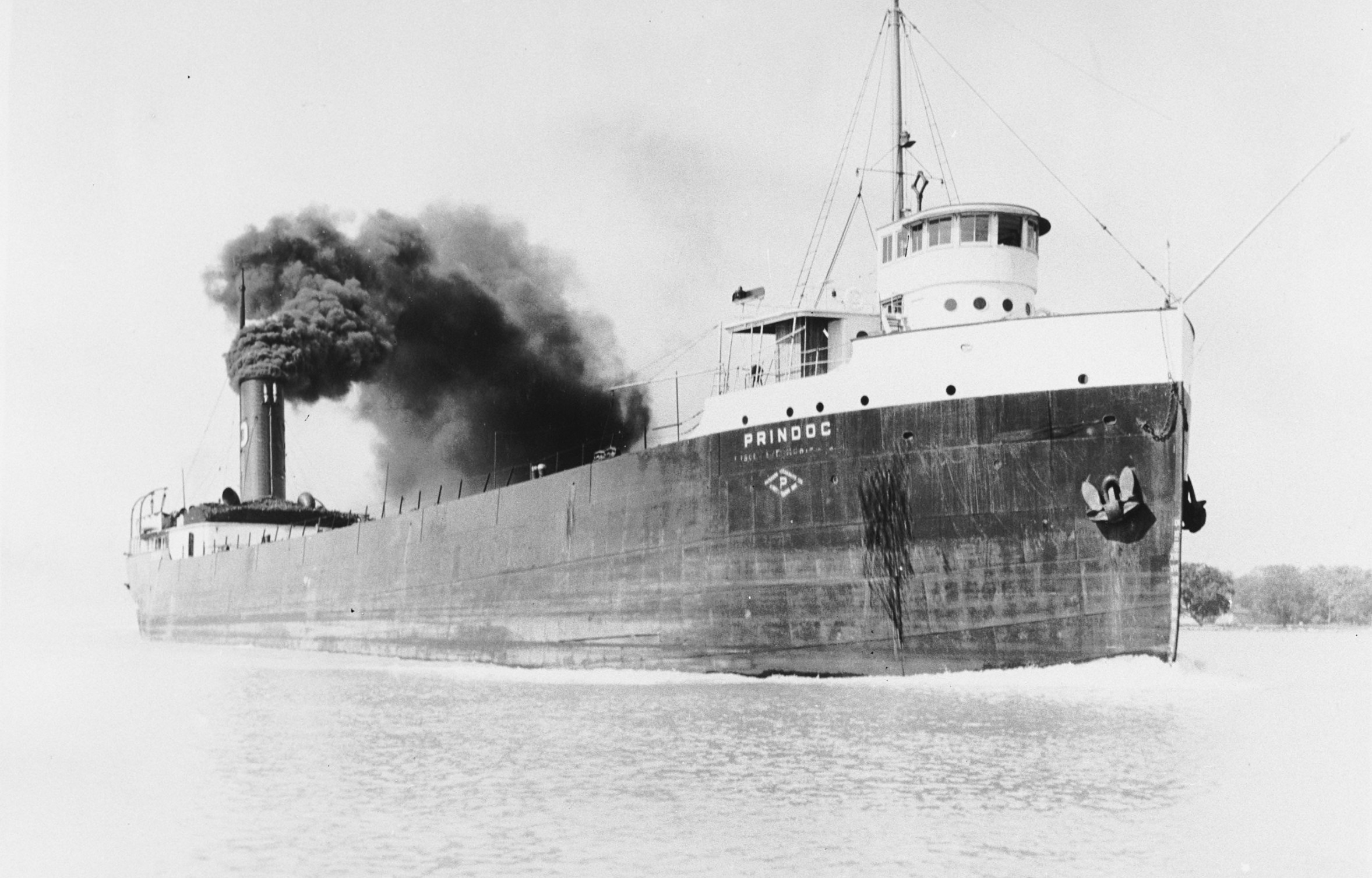

History

United States
- Name: Gilchrist (1901–1913); Lupus (1913–1926)
- Operator: Gilchrist Transportation Company (1901–1913); Interlake Steamship Company (1913–1926)
- Port of registry: Fairport, Ohio
- Builder: West Bay City Shipbuilding Company, West Bay City, Michigan
- Yard number: 603
- Launched: 15 May 1901
- In service: 1901
- Identification: US official number 86569

Canada
- Name: Prindoc
- Namesake: Prince Edward Island
- Operator: Paterson Steamships, Ltd. (1926–1943)
- Port of registry: Fort William, Ontario
- Out of service: 1 June 1943
- Identification: Canadian official number 116578
- Fate: Sank in a collision on Lake Superior

General characteristics
- Class & type: Lake freighter
- Tonnage: 3,871 GRT; 2,997 NRT
- Length: 370 feet (112.8 m) o/a; 356 feet (108.5 m) p/p
- Beam: 50 feet (15 m)
- Depth: 28 feet (8.5 m)
- Installed power: Engine: 1 × 1,480 hp (1,100 kW) 85 rpm triple expansion engine; Boilers: 2 × 170 pounds per square inch (1,200 kPa) Scotch marine boilers
- Propulsion: 1 × propeller

SS Prindoc was an American–built lake freighter in service between 1901 and 1943. She was built under the name Gilchrist, by the West Bay City Shipbuilding Company in West Bay City, Michigan, for the Gilchrist Transportation Company. Once the fleet went into receivership in 1913, Gilchris was sold to the Interlake Steamship Company, receiving the name Lupus. She was sold to a Canadian owner Paterson Steamships, Ltd. in 1926, and was renamed Prindoc. She sank in a collision with the freighter Battleford on 1 June 1943, on Lake Superior.

Prindoc is the third largest undiscovered shipwreck in Lake Superior and the Great Lakes as a whole, behind the freighters D. M. Clemson and James Gayley.

== History ==
=== Background ===
The gunship USS Michigan became the first iron-hulled vessel built on the Great Lakes, upon her launching in 1843, in Erie, Pennsylvania. By the mid-1840s, Canadian merchants were importing iron vessels prefabricated in the United Kingdom. The first iron–hulled merchant vessel built on the lakes, Merchant, was built in 1862, in Buffalo, New York. Despite Merchant's clear success proving the potential of iron hulls, ships built from wood remained preferable until the 1880s, due to their lower cost, as well as the abundance of high quality timber and workers trained in carpentry. Between the early–1870s and the mid-1880s, shipyards around the Great Lakes began to construct iron ships on a relatively large scale. The most notable being the freighter Onoko, built by the Globe Iron Works Company, which became the largest vessel on the lakes upon her launch in 1882. In 1884, the first steel freighters were built on the Great Lakes. By the 1890s, metal had become a common hull material used on the lakes. The development of the pneumatic rivet gun and the advancement of gantry cranes enabled shipyard employees to work at an increased speed, with greater efficiency. This, combined with the rapidly decreasing steel prices, contributed to the rapid increase in the size of lake freighters in the late 19th and early 20th centuries. The first 400-foot (121.9 m) freighter was built in 1895, the first 500-foot (152.4 m) freighter arrived on the scene five years later.

Throughout the 1880s, the iron ore trade on the Great Lakes grew significantly, primarily due to the increasing size of the lake freighters, and the rise in the number of trips they made to the ore docks of Lake Superior. As the railways were unable to keep up with the rapid production of iron ore, bulk freighters became integral to the region's iron ore industry. By 1890, 56.95% of the 16,036,043 long tons (16,293,372 t) of the iron ore produced by mines in the United States was sourced from the region surrounding Lake Superior. Freighters engaged in the iron ore trade frequently carried coal on upbound voyages to fuel mining equipment and infrastructure, while hauling ore when downbound.

=== Final voyage and wreck ===
The wreck of Prindoc has never been found. As of 2025, she is the third largest undiscovered shipwreck, both on Lake Superior and on the Great Lakes, behind the 468-foot (142.6 m) freighter D. M. Clemson, and the 436 feet (132.9 m) freighter James Gayley.

== Sources ==
- Baillod, Brendon (2025). "Lost Leviathans: Lake Superior". Madison, Wisconsin: Great Lakes Shipwreck Research – via Prezi.
- Bowlus, W. Bruce (2010). Iron Ore Transport on the Great Lakes: The Development of a Delivery System to Feed American Industry. Jefferson, North Carolina: McFarland & Company, Inc. ISBN 978-0-786433-26-1.
- Bugbee, Gordon P. (1962a). "Iron Merchant Ships: An Upper Lakes Centennial - Part One" (PDF). Telescope. 11 (2). Detroit, Michigan: Great Lakes Maritime Institute: 24–27 – via Maritime History of the Great Lakes.
- Bugbee, Gordon P. (1962b). "Iron Merchant Ships: An Upper Lakes Cenntenial – Part Two" (PDF). Telescope. 11 (3). Detroit, Michigan: Great Lakes Maritime Institute: 46–51 – via Maritime History of the Great Lakes.
- "Choctaw Shipwreck Site National Register of Historic Places Registration Form" (PDF). Washington D.C.: National Park Service. 2018. Archived from the original (PDF) on 1 January 2019.
- Herriman, H. N. (1905). "Great Lakes Register – For the Construction and Classification of Steel and Wooden Vessels – 1905". Chicago, Illinois: Lakeside Press – via Maritime History of the Great Lakes.
- Stonehouse, Frederick (1990) [1984]. Went Missing, II. Au Train, Michigan: Avery Color Studios. ISBN 978-0-932212-37-5.
- Thompson, Mark L. (1994). Queen of the Lakes. Detroit, Michigan: Wayne State University Press. ISBN 0-8143-2393-6.
