= SS Onoko =

Iron hulled Great Lakes freighter

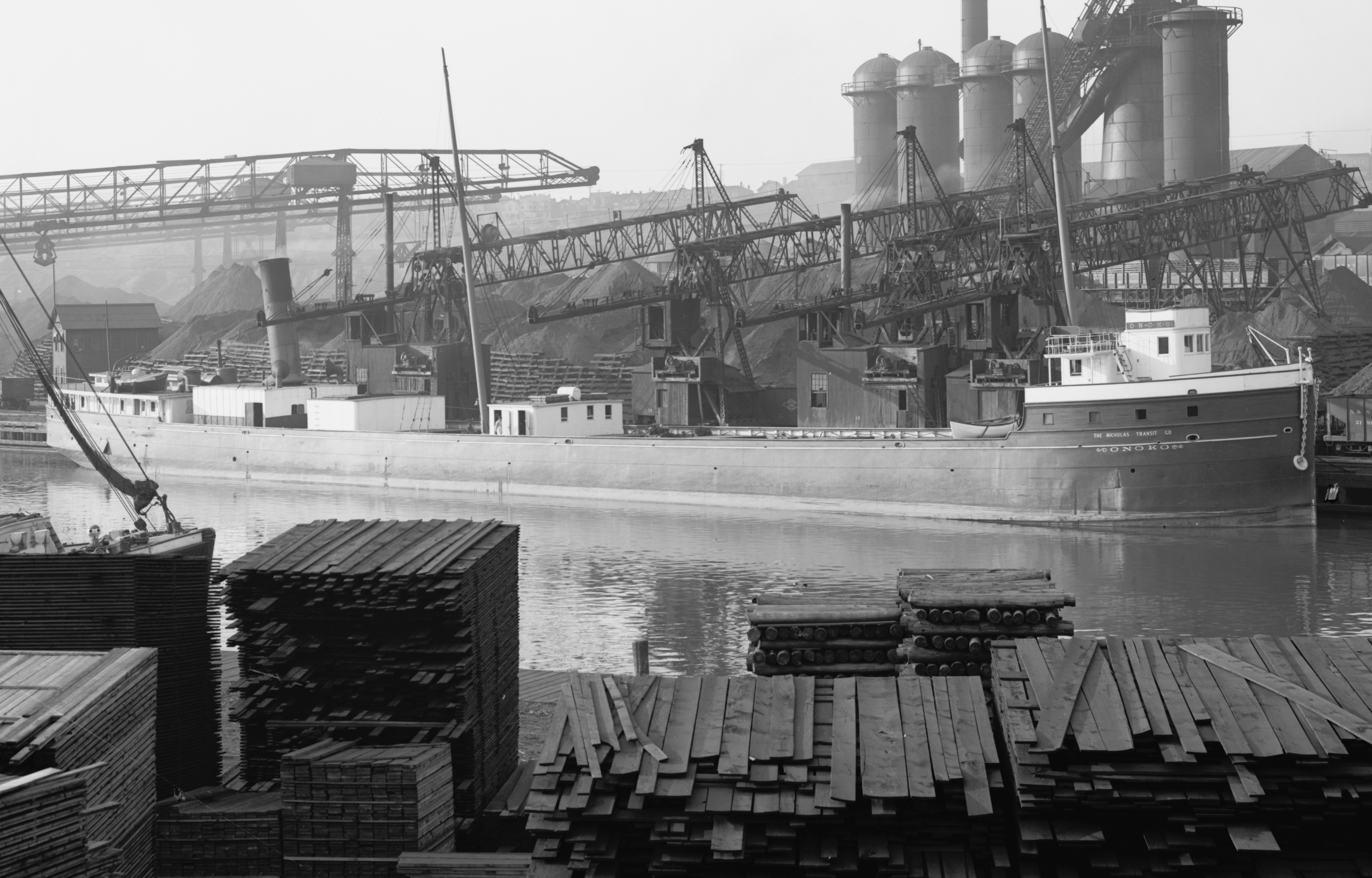

History

United States
- Name: Onoko
- Operator: Phillip Minch 1882–1895; Nicholas Transit Company 1895–1915
- Port of registry: United States
- Builder: Globe Iron Works Company
- Yard number: 4
- Launched: February 16, 1882
- Completed: 1882
- In service: March 31, 1882
- Out of service: September 15, 1915
- Identification: U.S. Registry #155048
- Fate: Sprang a leak and sank on Lake Superior with no loss of life

General characteristics
- Class & type: Bulk Freighter
- Tonnage: 2,164 GRT; 1,933 NRT
- Length: 302.6 ft (92.2 m)
- Beam: 38.6 ft (11.8 m)
- Height: 24.8 ft (7.6 m)
- Installed power: 2 × Scotch marine boilers
- Propulsion: Compound steam engine

National Register of Historic Places data
Onoko (Bulk Freight Steamer) Shipwreck
U.S. National Register of Historic Places
Location within Minnesota Location within the United States
Location	6 miles south of Knife River
Nearest city	Duluth, Minnesota
Coordinates	46°50.772′N 91°46.640′W
Built	1882
Architect	Globe Iron Works Company; William H. Radcliffe
Architectural style	Freighter
MPS	Minnesota's Lake Superior Shipwrecks MPS
NRHP reference No.	92000845
Added to NRHP	July 23, 1992

SS Onoko was an iron-hulled Great Lakes freighter. She was launched in 1882 in Cleveland, Ohio, by the Globe shipbuilding firm, as its hull number #4, and sank on September 14, 1915, in Lake Superior near Knife River, Minnesota. According to the Minnesota Historical Society, Onoko is regarded as a prototype of the single-steel hulled Great Lakes bulk carrier, These vessels made possible the cheap transport of bulk cargoes such as iron ore, coal and limestone. Her wreckage still remains on the bottom of Lake Superior and was listed on the National Register of Historic Places in 1992.

== History ==
=== Construction ===
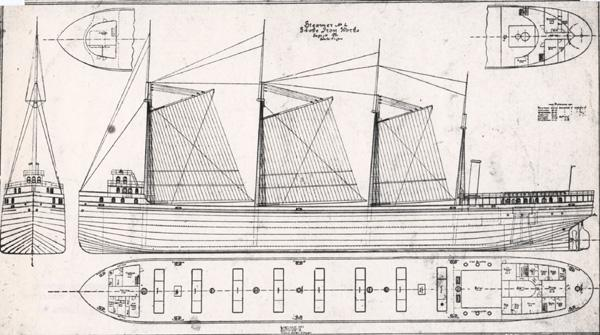
The plans for Onoko

Onoko (Official number 155048) was built at Radcliffe's yard in Cleveland by the Globe Iron Works Company and was launched on February 16, 1882. She had a length of 302.6-feet, a beam of 38.6 feet and a height of 24.8-feet. She was powered by a 900-horsepower compound steam engine fueled by two Scotch marine boilers, and gaff-rigged with auxiliary sails on four masts. She was commissioned by Phillip Minch of Vermillion, Ohio, for the Minch Transportation Company of the Kinsman Steamship Company and a syndicate of other investors. The ship was built to take advantage of the channels of 17-foot (5.2 m) depth opened in 1881 when the new Weitzel Lock was built at Sault Ste. Marie, Michigan.

The superintendent of Onoko's construction was John H. Smith, who learned iron shipbuilding technology and techniques on the River Clyde in Scotland. Smith worked for the newly founded Globe Shipbuilding Company of Cleveland, Ohio, successors to an old and respected boiler and engine building company.

On February 16, 1882, the day Onoko was scheduled to be launched, about five thousand people came to watch the launching despite rough weather conditions. With all preparations completed Smith gave the launch signal at 3 p.m., and Onoko slid into the water. During the next few months Onoko was outfitted and rigged. Although most of the vessel's machinery had been fitted before her launching, her masts at least were installed later by the Messrs. Upson, Walton & Company.

=== Service history ===
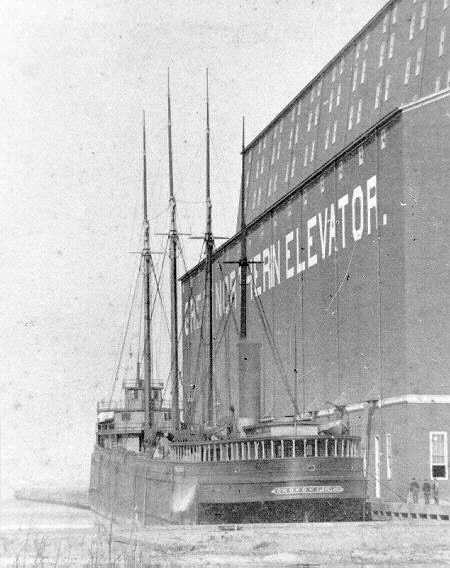
Onoko at the Great Northern Elevator in Superior, Wisconsin, c. 1895

Onoko was enrolled in Cleveland on March 31, 1882. On her maiden voyage Onoko sailed from Cleveland on April 19, 1882, leaving port at 11 p.m. and arriving in Chicago around 2 p.m. the next day. She was carrying 2,536 tons of coal. Onoko's captain, W.H. Pringle, reported that Onoko "behaved splendidly and steered like a yacht". By April 25, Onoko had been loaded with a cargo of wheat bound for Buffalo, New York, and left at 3:30 p.m. She discharged 88,140 bushels of wheat at the Niagara B Elevator. Not a bit of the cargo was wet. It was thought that Onoko could carry 115,000 to 120,000 bushels of wheat. Onoko's capacity to carry oats was believed to be at around 155,000 bushels. The Buffalo Courier provides an accurate account of when Onoko arrived in Buffalo. It said that "About noon on Saturday the new iron steamer Onoko arrived here with something over 88,000 bushels wheat. She left Chicago last Tuesday at 4:20PM and her time in coming down was three days and nineteen and a half hours".

On May 2, 1882, the writers of the Buffalo Courier wrote a rather unpleasant report about the looks of Onoko:

The Onoko is the largest vessel afloat on the lakes - and by far the homeliest. She looks very like a huge canal boat with a smokestack and four sticks. Her model is really frightful; her upper works are without decent shape, and to cap all her painting is but a daub. For a new vessel she is the worst looking sight that ever appeared on our inland waters. She could have been given a respectable appearance without much interfering with her carrying qualities. One of these days we will show those Cleveland fellows an iron steamer that will be worth looking at. The Onoko is an eye-sore.

The Buffalo Courier criticizing the appearance of Onoko did not sit well with her owners. On May 5, 1882, the Cleveland Herald responded that function trumped form:

The Buffalo papers took occasion when the steamship Onoko was there a few days ago to speak disparagingly of her qualities, especially her homeliness, and wound up by calling her an "eye-sore." This is ridiculous, in view of late developments. A Buffalo party has been in this city the past few days negotiating with the owners of the Onoko with a view to her purchase. He was anxious to secure her, "eye-sore" and all, at a price considerably above the cost of building. There was a disposition on the part of some of her owners to accept his terms, but the others would not part with their interest, and the arrangement fell through. The owners are well satisfied with the way the boat works.

Onoko had proved herself to be a success in her first two years of carrying bulk cargoes on the Great Lakes. On August 22, 1884, the Cleveland Herald reported that Onoko had "proved even more successful than her owners hoped for".

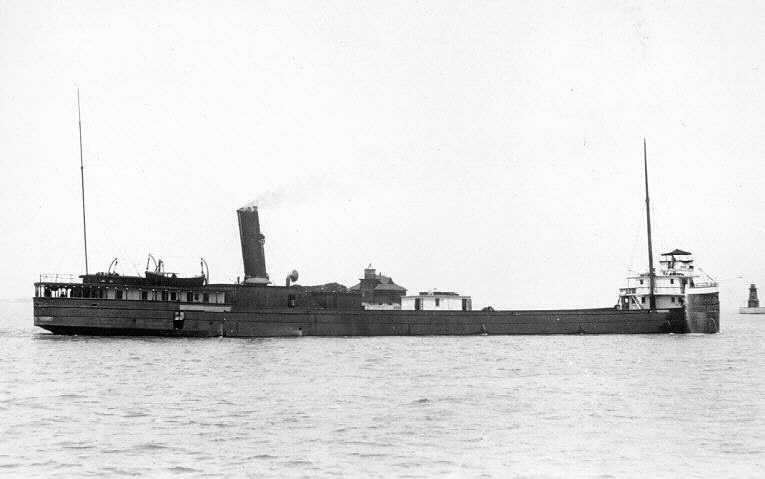
Onoko underway circa 1910

In 1895, two of Onoko's mast were removed, her wooden forecastle was replaced with a steel deck and steel pilothouse structure. In 1896, she had her boilers replaced with two 12-foot × 12.5-foot Scotch marine boilers. On May 16, 1896 Onoko collided with the schooner Mary D. Ayer in heavy fog on Lake Michigan. Five sailors on Mary D. Ayer died. Onoko's wooden spar deck was replaced with steel in 1901. Later that year the principal owners of Onoko, the Nicholas Transportation Company, bought out all the lesser stockholders to become sole owner of Onoko. Onoko had steel aft cabins installed in 1907 through 1908.

In 1910, Captain Harry Stewart was appointed as the master of Onoko. On the night of December 1, 1910, Onoko ran aground on Southeast Shoal during a snowstorm 60 miles below Amherstburg, between Point Pelee and Wheatley, Ontario. She was released with three tugs, including Harding and Rescue, that were sent to rescue Onoko. She was carrying coal at the time. On December 2, 1910, the Duluth Herald wrote an article saying Onoko was not in any serious danger. The tugs succeeded in refloating her without serious damage to her hull. On October 7, 1912, Onoko sprang a leak and was intentionally beached in the Apostle Islands. The cost to patch her hull was minimal.

== Sinking ==
In early September, 1915, Onoko grounded while departing a grain elevator in Duluth, but freed herself and cleared the harbor safely. It is thought damage resulting from the grounding led to the development of an aggressive leak that sank her a few days later.

On September 15, 1915 Onoko departed Duluth, Minnesota, with 110,000 bushels of wheat bound for Toledo, Ohio. She sprang a major leak off Knife Island about 15 miles from Duluth, Minnesota. On September 15, 1915, the Duluth Herald wrote an article saying:

All went well and the sea was smooth, when while on the regular course, about nine miles off Knife island, the engineer, J.J. Higgins, reported to the master, Capt. W.R. Dunn, that the vessel had sprung a leak under the engines and that the water was coming in fast. When Capt. Dunn went back to investigate, the water was spurting in and in a few minutes drowned out the fire. The captain saw that the situation was hopeless and ordered out the boats. All of the crew including the one woman on board, Mrs. C.R. Cranbee, wife of the steward, and the lone passenger, Antone Rehor, a cement contractor of Cleveland, had no trouble reaching the boats and safety, and in a few minutes the steamer, her stern having filled rapidly, tossed her nose in the air and plunged stern first to the bottom.

The boats were at a safe distance, and the members of the crew were not worried; before they left the ship, they saw the steamer Renown, a tanker belonging to the Standard Oil company, which had left Duluth shortly after Onoko, coming on full speed, the master of the tanker having noticed that Onoko was settling. In a few minutes Renown, with barge C in tow, came up and picked up the occupants of the lifeboats. Renown put about and took the crew back to Duluth, being met just outside the Duluth canal by a tug, which took Onoko's crew off, Renown and her tow resuming their journey down the lakes.

== Wreck ==
The wreck of Onoko was discovered on April 10, 1988, by noted shipwreck hunters Jerry Eliason of Scanlon, Minnesota, and Kraig Smith of Rice Lake, Wisconsin, after they conducted a thorough search using a depth finder. Her wreck rests upside down in 220 feet (67 m) of water with her stern buried almost completely in mud. Her hull is broken nearly in two, with the split in her hull right in front of her boilers. Her wreck is surrounded by many artifacts from inside and outside her hull. Her cargo of grain is still in her cargo hold. It is illegal to remove artifacts from her wreck without permission because she is protected by the state of Minnesota
