= SS Hesper =

Bulk-freighter steamship that sank in Lake Superior

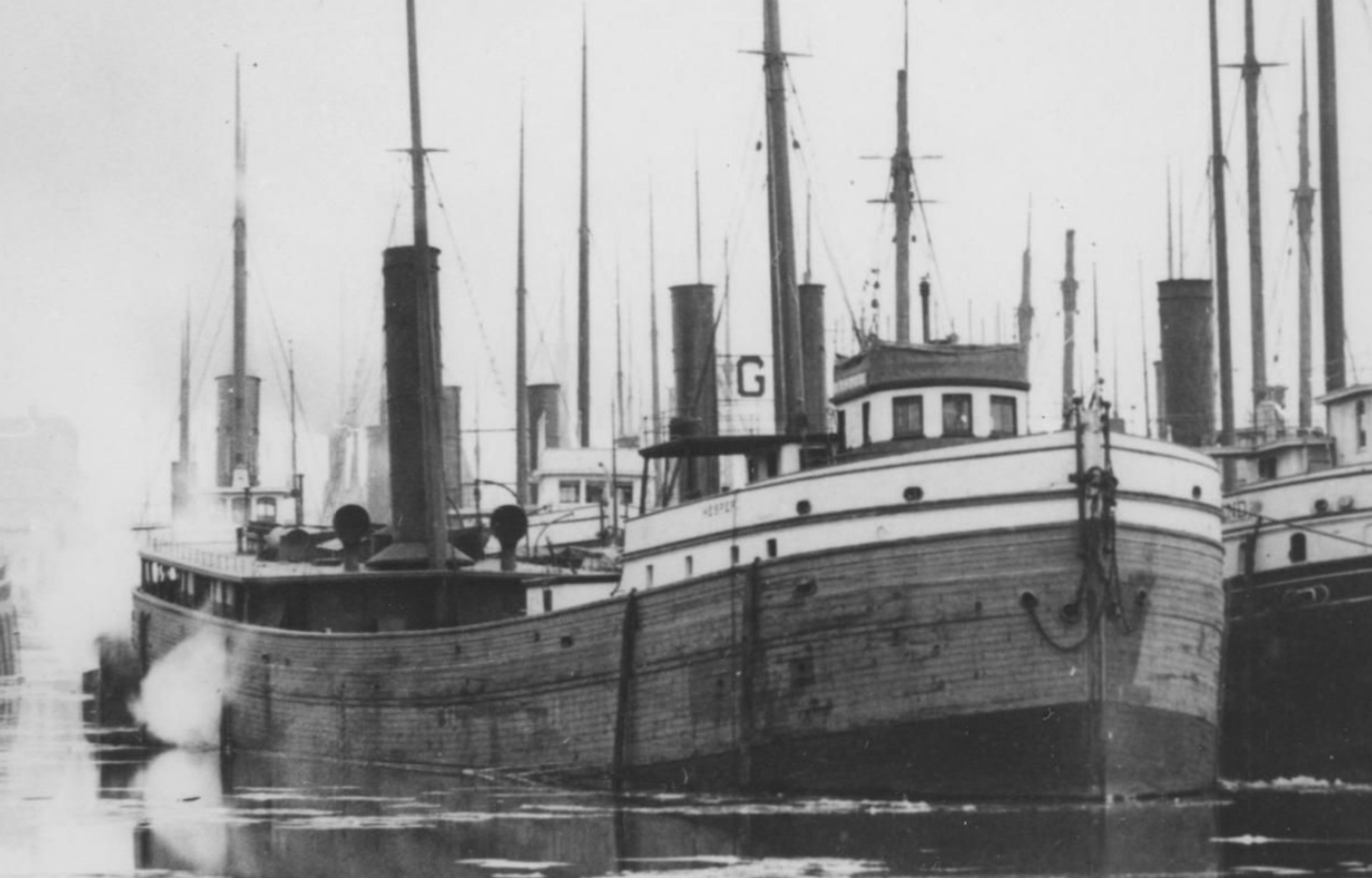

History

United States
- Namesake: Hesperus, the evening star
- Builder: Ship Owners Dry Dock Company, Cleveland, Ohio
- Launched: June 28, 1890
- Fate: Sank, 4 May 1905

General characteristics
- Displacement: 1540 long tons (1560 metric tons)
- Length: 250 ft (76.2 m)
- Beam: 41.6 ft (12.7 m)
- Draught: 20.2 ft (6.2 m)
- Propulsion: Vertical triple-expansion reciprocating steam engine, 825 horsepower
- Complement: Captain E.H. Heaton and a crew of 15
- Hesper Shipwreck Site
- U.S. National Register of Historic Places
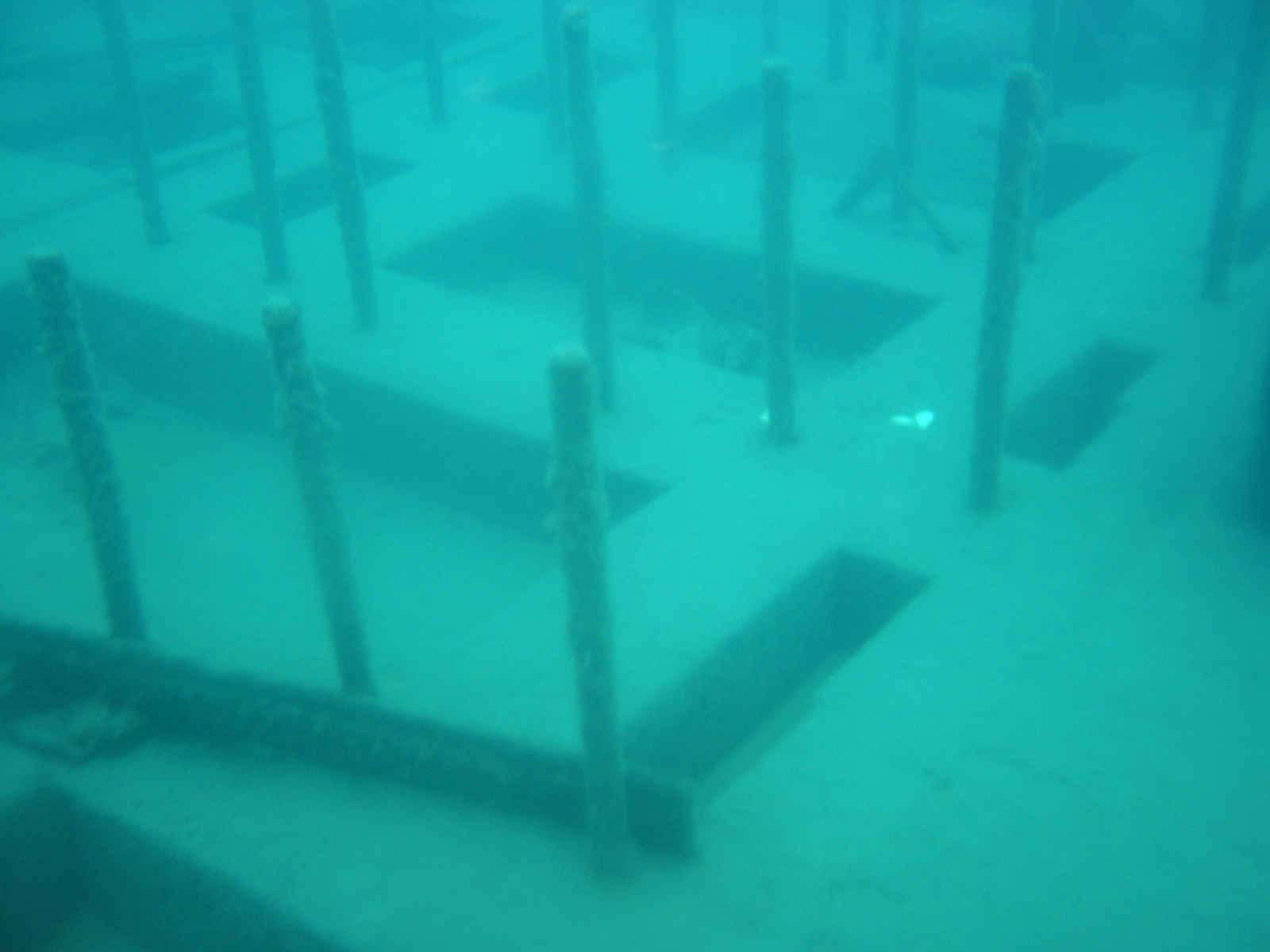
- A section of several long bolts on the ceiling, presumably used to mount the engine.

- Location within Minnesota Location within the United States
- Nearest city: Silver Bay, Minnesota, USA
- Coordinates: 47°16′17″N 91°16′18″W
- Built: 1890
- Architect: Radcliffe, William H.; Shipowners Drydock Company
- MPS: Minnesota's Lake Superior Shipwrecks MPS
- NRHP reference No.: 94000343
- Added to NRHP: April 14, 1994

Hesper was a bulk-freighter steamship that was used to tow schooner-barges on the Great Lakes. She sank in Lake Superior off Silver Bay, Minnesota, in a late-spring snowstorm in 1905. The remains of the ship are listed on the National Register of Historic Places.

Hesper was a wooden-hulled, single-screw, triple-masted, cargo ship built by the Bradley Transportation Company in Cleveland, Ohio. She was used to haul both iron ore and grain, two products important to Minnesota's economy at the time.

Hesper was caught in a late-spring snowstorm on 4 May 1905, with a strong nor'easter with winds of 60 mph (97 km/h) driving her off her intended course and smashing her into a reef that now marks the southwest end of the harbor in Silver Bay, Minnesota. The ship foundered and sank in about 42 feet (13 m) of water. The crew was able to escape in the ship's lifeboats, but the ship was a total loss.

The wreck of Hesper is well preserved and lies in 30 to 48 feet (9 to 15 meters) of water about halfway down the west breakwall of the Silver Bay harbor. The hull is split apart at the turn of the bilge, and the port and starboard sides of the ship lie alongside and roughly parallel to the ceiling of the hull. The sides both contain timbers that were used to mount the decks, which are no longer present. The decks are presumed to have washed ashore after the ship sank. The aft end of the hull contains a number of long bolts that were used to mount the engine.
