= SS Harriet B. =

Wooden-hulled barge that served on the Great Lakes of North America

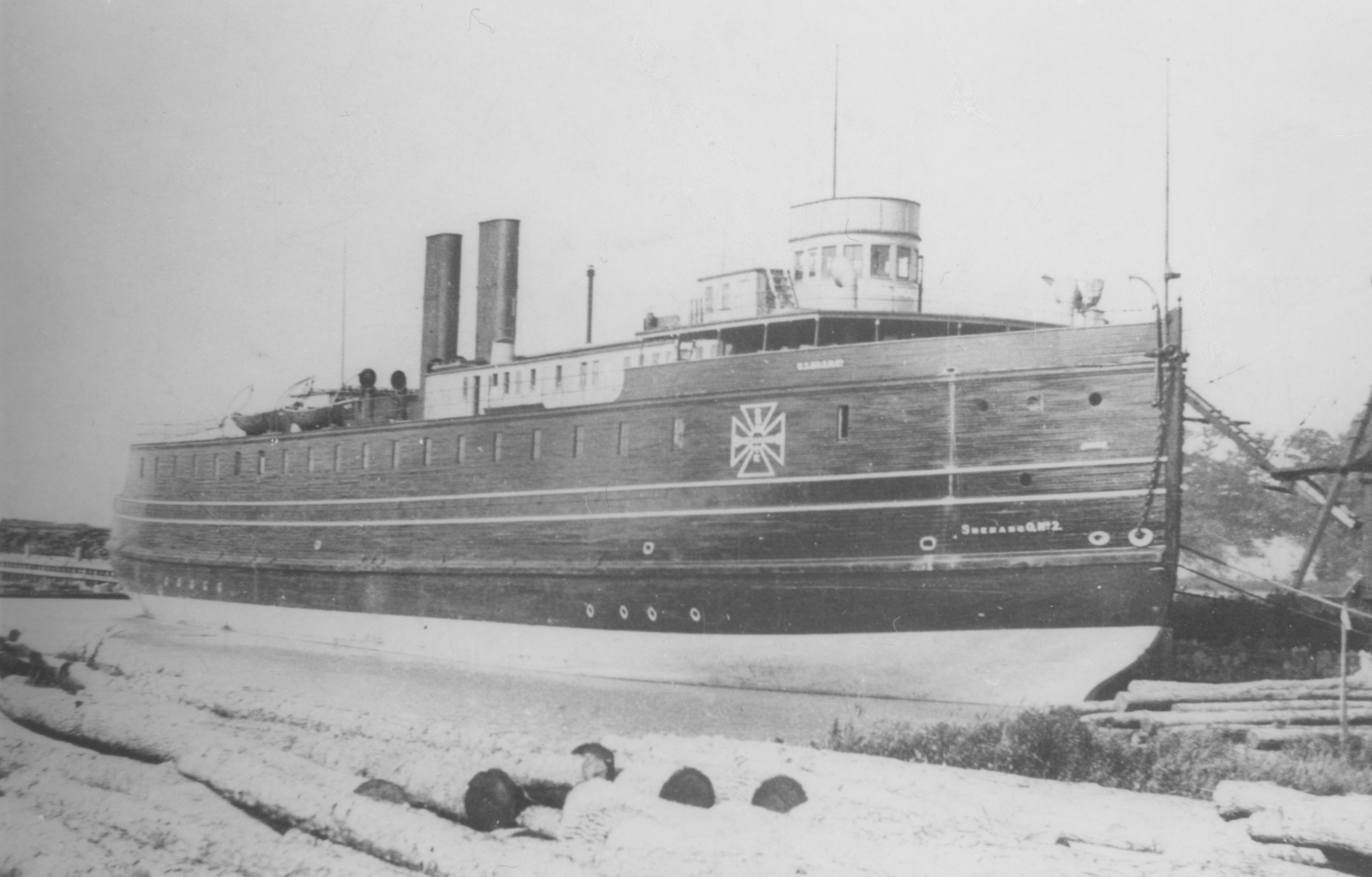
- The Harriet B. as the Shenango No.2

History

United States
- Name: Harriet B.
- Operator: Hammermill Paper Company
- Builder: Craig Shipbuilding
- Yard number: 69
- Launched: October 25, 1895
- Out of service: May 3, 1922
- Identification: U.S. Registry #116695
- Fate: Sunk 1922

General characteristics
- Type: Barge
- Tonnage: 1938.12 gross register tons; 1317.92 net register tons
- Length: 300 feet (91 m) LOA; 283 feet (86 m) LBP
- Beam: 53 feet (16 m)
- Depth: 19.33 feet (5.89 m)
- Installed power: 2 x 1250-horsepower fore and aft compound steam engines

National Register of Historic Places data
Harriet B. (shipwreck)
U.S. National Register of Historic Places
Location within Minnesota Location within the United States
Location	Four miles off Two Harbors, Minnesota
Nearest city	Two Harbors, Minnesota
Coordinates	46°57.347′N 91°37.895′W
Built	1895
Architect	Craig Shipbuilding Company
Architectural style	shipwreck site
MPS	Minnesota's Lake Superior Shipwrecks MPS
NRHP reference No.	100002773
Added to NRHP	August 9, 2018

The Harriet B. was a wooden-hulled barge that served on the Great Lakes of North America, originally as the railroad ferry Shenango No.2, then a bulk carrier and finally as an unpowered barge. She sank four miles off Two Harbors, Minnesota, on May 3, 1922, after being rammed by the steel freighter Quincy A. Shaw. Her wreck was accidentally located upright and intact in 2005 in 656 feet (200 m) of water. On August 9, 2018, the wreck of the Harriet B. was listed on the National Register of Historic Places.

== History ==
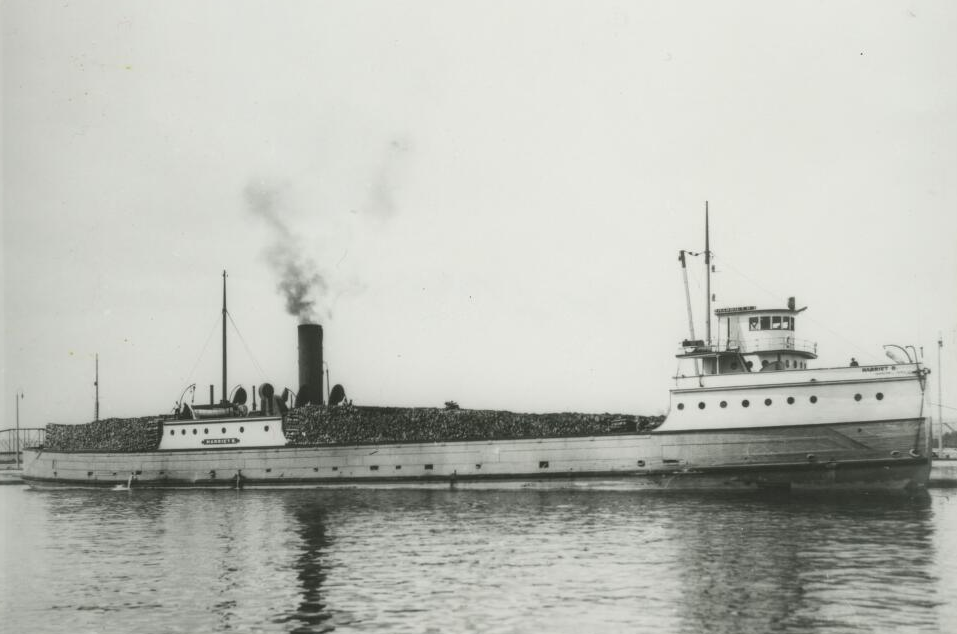
The Harriet B. with a cargo of pulpwood

The Shenango No.2 (Official number 116695) was built in 1895 in Toledo, Ohio, by Craig Shipbuilding. She was built for the United States & Ontario Steam Navigation Company of Conneaut, Ohio, a subsidiary Pittsburgh, Shenango & Lake Erie Railroad Company. At an overall length of 300 feet (91 m), and a between perpendiculars length of 283 feet (86 m) the Shenango No.2 was one of the largest wooden ships ever built. She had a beam of 53 feet (16 m), and her hull was 19.33 feet (5.89 m) deep. She had a gross register tonnage of 1938.12 and a net register tonnage of 1317.92. She was powered by two 1250-horsepower fore and aft compound engines. She was launched on October 25, 1895, as hull number #69.

In 1898 the Shenango No.2 was sold to the Detroit, Grand Rapids & Western Railroad Company of Muskegon, Michigan, and was renamed Muskegon. On October 20, 1898, the Muskegon collided with the dock & elevator of American Malting Company at Milwaukee, Wisconsin. Sometime in 1900 the Muskegon ran into ice and broke her rudder in a gale in an unknown location. In 1901 she was sold to the Pere Marquette Rail Road Company and was renamed Pere Marquette 16. On December 21, 1901, she sank at Ludington, Michigan, and was raised. In 1918 the Pere Marquette 16 was sold to the Hammermill Paper Company of Erie, Pennsylvania, where she was cut down to a bulk freighter for use in the pulpwood trade, and was renamed Harriet B. In 1921 the Harriet B. was reduced to a barge.

== Final voyage and sinking ==
On May 3, 1922, the freighter C.W. Jacob was towing the Harriet B., and another barge Crete; all three vessels were loaded with pulpwood. The vessels arrived near Two Harbors, Minnesota at around 1:00 a.m.; but because of heavy fog, the Jacob's captain decided to wait for the fog to clear before proceeding into the harbour. The three vessels anchored about a mile off shore, and three miles southwest of the breakwater light. Meanwhile, the steel-hulled freighter Quincy A. Shaw was moving quickly up the lake. At 4:50 a.m., the Shaw's bow appeared out of the fog and crashed into the port side of the Harriet B., almost cutting her in two. After the collision, the crew of the Harriet B. boarded the Shaw. The Harriet B. sank twenty minutes later. After she sank, her wheelhouse washed ashore nearby.

== Discovery ==
The remains of the Harriet B. were accidentally discovered in 2005 by the University of Minnesota Duluth research boat Blue Heron while they were conducting a geological survey of the lake bottom. The crew of the Blue Heron contacted Jerry Eliason and Randy Bebe, who used drop cameras and side-scan sonar to confirm the identity of the wreck.

== The Harriet B. today ==
The Harriet B. rests upright, and almost totally intact in 656 feet (200 m) of water approximately four miles off Two Harbors, Minnesota. Because of the extreme depth of the wreck, diving is not advised. Jerry Eliason said that "even a brief visit to the wreck would require at least eight hours of decompression stops on the way back to the surface to complete the dive safely". The wreck is believed to be the most intact shipwreck in Minnesota waters.
