= Edna G =

Tugboat

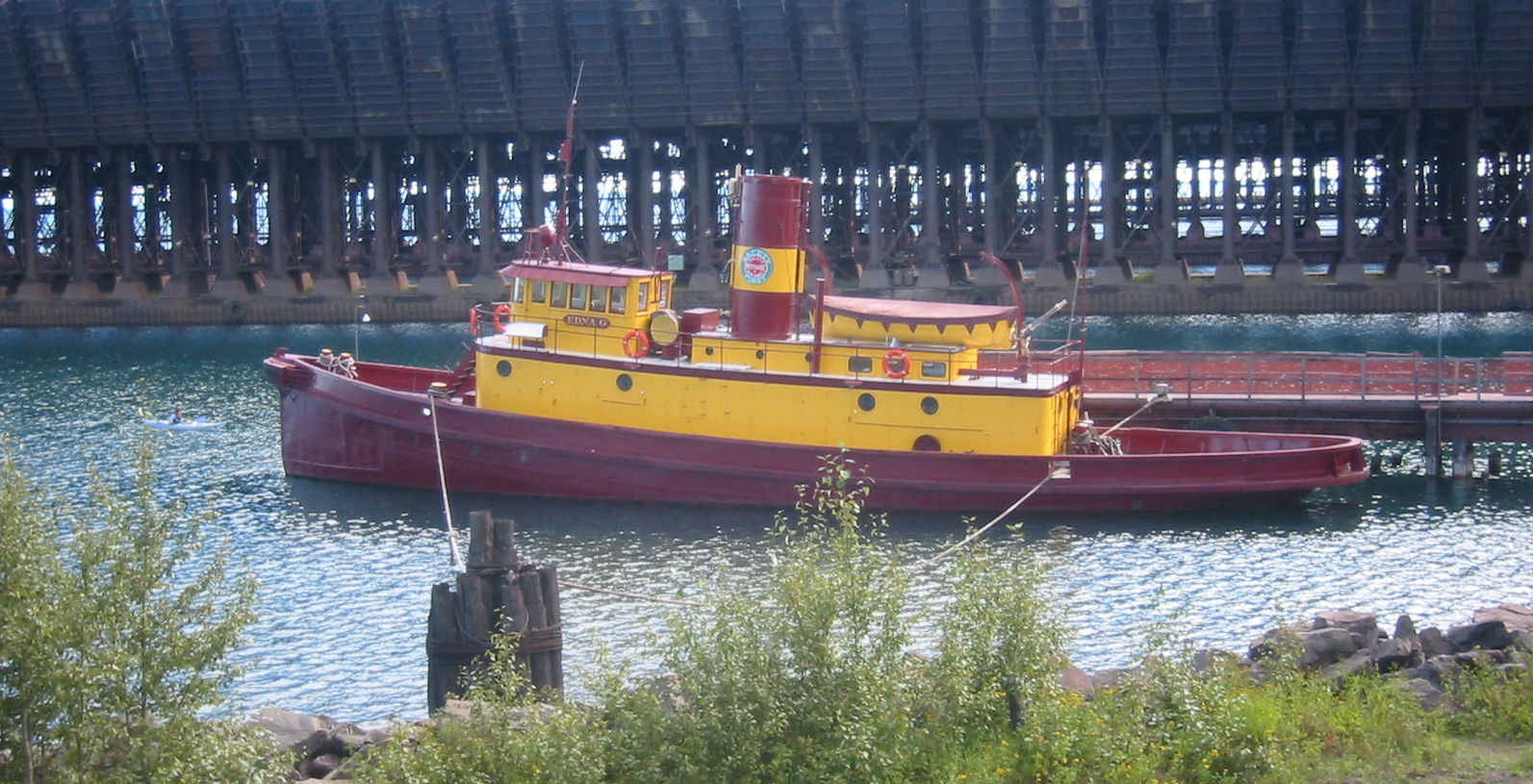

History

United States
- Name: Edna G
- Owner: Duluth and Iron Range Railroad
- Builder: Cleveland Shipbuilding Company
- Cost: $35,397.50
- In service: 1898–1931, 1933–1981

General characteristics
- Type: Tugboat
- Length: 92.42 feet (28.17 m)
- Beam: 23 feet (7.0 m)
- Depth: 7.42 feet (2.26 m)
- Installed power: coal-fired steam-engine
- Edna G
- U.S. National Register of Historic Places
- Location within Minnesota
- Location: Two Harbors, Minnesota
- Coordinates: 47°1′0.84″N 91°40′21.52″W
- Built: 1896
- Architect: Cleveland Ship Building Company
- NRHP reference No.: 75002144
- Added to NRHP: June 5, 1975

Edna G is a tugboat which worked the Great Lakes and is now preserved as a museum ship. Edna G was built by the Cleveland Shipbuilding Company in 1896 for the Duluth and Iron Range Railroad at a cost $35,397.50. She was named for the daughter of J. L. Greatsinger, president of the railroad.

She has a length of 92.42 feet (28.17 m), a beam of 23 feet (7.0 m), a depth of 7.42 feet (2.26 m), a gross register tonnage of 154 tons, and a net register tonnage of 67 tons.

Home-ported at Two Harbors, Minnesota, Edna G moved ships and barges carrying iron ore and taconite from the Mesabi Range and other smaller sites in the Iron Range region of northeast Minnesota. She spent her entire working career at Two Harbors with the exception of World War I (1917–1919) when she served on the eastern seaboard. She was out of service from 1931 to 1933 due to the depression.

Over the years Edna G was involved in several shipwreck rescues including the surviving crew of the Madeira. Her last tow was the Cason J. Calloway on December 30, 1980. She was the last coal-fired, steam-engine tug in service on the lakes when she was retired in 1981.

Edna G. is one of the attractions of the Lake County Historical Society in Two Harbors. Following reports of continued weakening of the hull though corrosion and exposure to ice, in January 2017 Two Harbors City Council initiated further studies of the viability of continuing her preservation ashore.
