= Knife River, Minnesota =

Unincorporated community in Minnesota, United States

- Unincorporated community
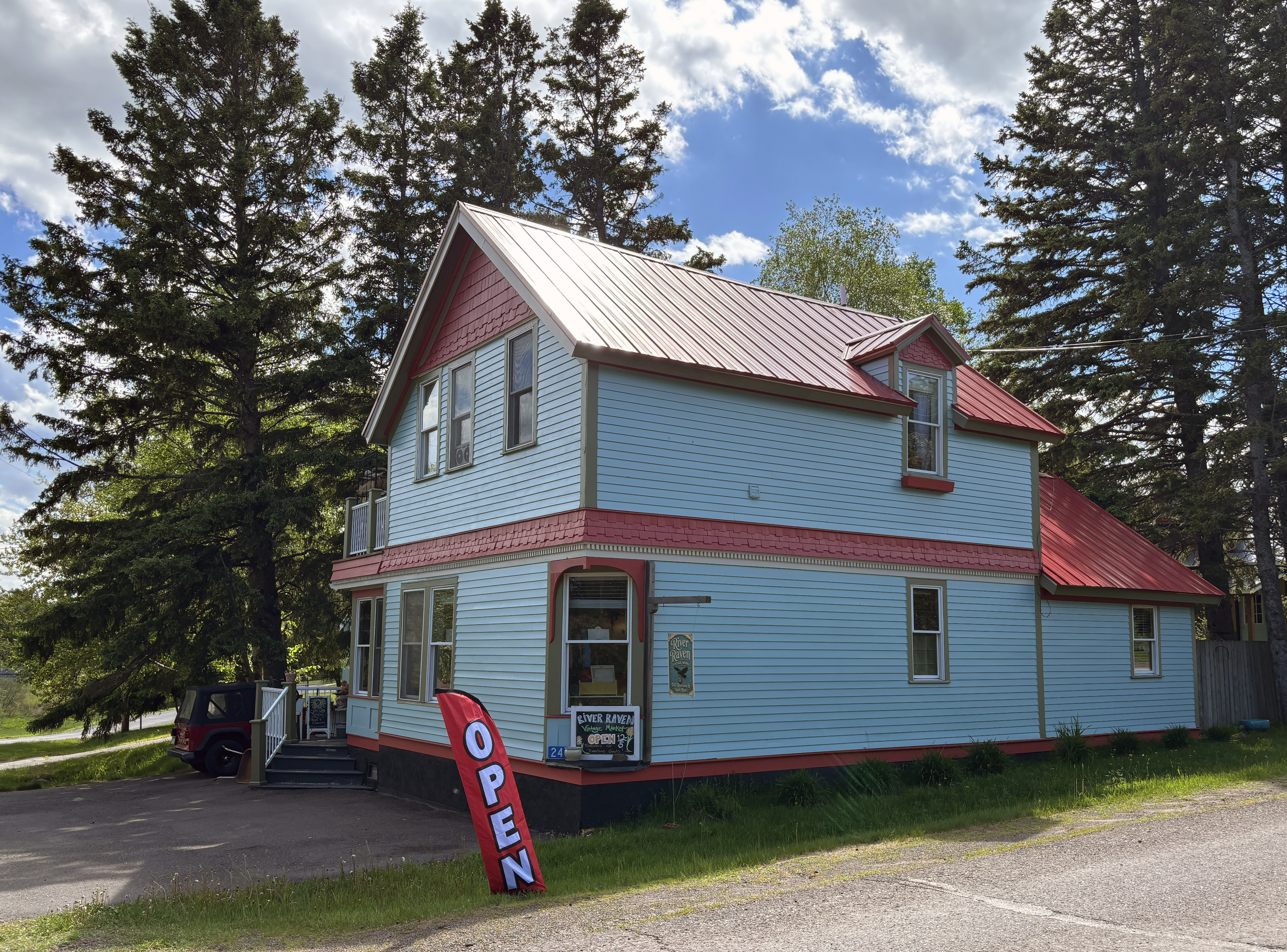
- Store in Knife River

- Location within Minnesota Location within the United States
- Coordinates: 46°56′58″N 91°46′45″W
- Country: United States
- State: Minnesota
- County: Lake

Area
  - Total: 0.69 sq mi (1.79 km^{2})
  - Land: 0.67 sq mi (1.73 km^{2})
  - Water: 0.023 sq mi (0.06 km^{2})
- Elevation: 600 ft (180 m)

Population (2020)
  - Total: 212
  - Density: 318.1/sq mi (122.83/km^{2})
- Time zone: UTC-6 (Central (CST))
  - Summer (DST): UTC-5 (CDT)
- ZIP code: 55609
- Area code: 218
- GNIS feature ID: 646206

Knife River is an unincorporated community in Lake County, Minnesota, United States; located on the North Shore of Lake Superior.

The community is located between Duluth and Two Harbors on the North Shore Scenic Drive (County 61), at the mouth of the Knife River, from which it gets its name.

Knife River is located 8 miles southwest of the city of Two Harbors. The boundary line between Lake and Saint Louis counties is nearby.

Knife River is located within Lake No. 2 Unorganized Territory of Lake County.

== History ==
The community of Knife River was originally established in 1856 as Buchanan, located on the west side of the Knife River. A separate community of Mellie, located on the east side of the river was platted in 1899, following the building of the Alger–Smith Lumber Company's railroad in 1898; Mellie changed its name to Knife River in 1903. The two communities incorporated themselves as the village of Knife River on October 2, 1909; but since have returned to being an unincorporated community.

The SS Benjamin Noble foundered off Knife River in April 1914, with the loss of all hands.

Historical population
Census	Pop.	Note	%±
1910	491		—
2020	212		—
U.S. Decennial Census
