= Samuel Augustus Fuller =

American steel executive (1837–1891)

Samuel Augustus Fuller Sr.
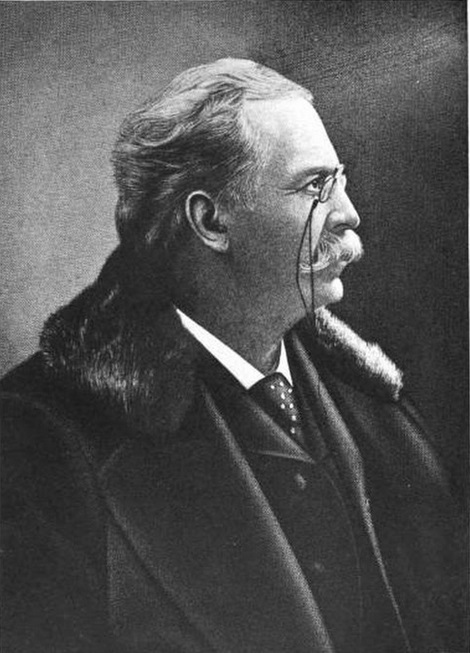
- Samuel Augustus Fuller
- Born: August 8, 1837; Vienna, Ohio, U.S.
- Died: October 23, 1891 (aged 54); Cleveland, Ohio, U.S.
- Occupations: Iron and steel industry executive
- Spouse: Julia Elizabeth Clark Fuller
- Children: 10

Samuel Augustus Fuller Sr. (August 8, 1837 - October 23, 1891) was an American steel industry executive during the Gilded Age in the United States. A resident of Cleveland, Ohio, he founded the Union Iron Works and Condit-Fuller & Co., which later became the Bourne-Fuller Company. Cyrus S. Eaton combined this company with two others to form the Republic Steel Company which became the third largest steel company in the U.S., trailing only U.S. Steel and Bethlehem Steel in size.

== Early life ==
On August 8, 1837, in Vienna, Ohio, Samuel Augustus Fuller was one of five children born to Augustus and Mary Ann (née Hutchins) Fuller. (Note: Mary's middle name may have been Anna.) He was a direct descendant of Edward Fuller, a passenger on the Mayflower, the ship that transported the first English Puritans (known today as Pilgrims) from Plymouth, England, to the New World in 1620. His father, Augustus Fuller, had been born in August 1805 in Burlington, Connecticut, and emigrated to Trumbull County, Ohio in 1830. His mother, Mary Fuller, was born in Vienna in August 1806. She was the sister of Representative John Hutchins, and daughter of Samuel Hutchins (who had walked from Connecticut to Ohio as part of a survey party in 1789).

The Fuller family moved to Cleveland in 1847. Augustus founded a wholesale cap, hat, and fur business, and the Fullers were co-founders of the Euclid Avenue Presbyterian Church. Samuel was educated in the Cleveland public schools, graduating from Central High School in 1853 at the age of 16.

Samuel joined his father's business immediately after graduation, where he trained as an accountant. He proved to be an excellent businessman, and in 1859 his father made him a partner in the firm (which was renamed A. Fuller & Son). He remained associated with his father's firm and other retail businesses for the next decade.

== Iron and steel industry ==
The first iron foundry in the greater Cleveland area was founded in 1834. By 1837, there were four foundries, and by 1846 there were six. All of these were small and produced inferior-quality products, as they relied on the poor-quality iron ore found in Ohio. The metals industry in Cleveland in 1860 consisted of just three shops, which manufactured iron bar and plate. The completion in 1856 of the Cleveland and Mahoning Valley Railroad through the city provided the impetus for the establishment of the iron and steel industry in Cleveland by linking the mills to sources for raw materials, opening up regional markets for iron and steel, and for allowing Cleveland to serve as a transshipment center for high-quality hematite ore from the Marquette Iron Range to inland areas. The establishment of what would become the Cleveland Rolling Mill in 1856 (Note: Formed as Jones & Co., it was renamed Chisholm, Jones and Co. in 1857 after an investment by Henry and William Chisholm. After an 1860 investment by Amasa Stone and his brother, Andros, the company took the name Stone, Chisholm & Jones. It became the Cleveland Rolling Mill on November 9, 1862, after receiving investments from Henry B. Payne, Jeptha Wade, and Stillman Witt.) proved to be the starting point of the emergence of a vast steel industry in Cleveland. Another 21 iron and steel mills were established in the area between 1860 and 1866, and by the end of the 1860s steel had become Cleveland's biggest industry.

Fuller joined the Cleveland Iron and Nail Company in 1869, and was elected secretary of the firm. That same year, Fuller founded the Union Iron Works (Note: Also known as the Union Iron Works Company.) at what is now the northeast corner of the intersection of Union Avenue and E. 78th Street in Cleveland to reroll worn railway rails. Henry Chisholm purchased the company in 1871 and combined it with the Aetna Iron and Nail Company. (Note: This firm was established in June 1867 at what is now the intersection of Aetna Road and E. 82nd Street. This was land owned by Fuller.) Chisholm built the massive Emma Furnace at the Union Iron site in 1872.

In 1878, Canada imposed a steep tariff on imported iron and steel. Fuller transplanted his family to Hamilton, Ontario, that same year, where he founded an iron mill to meet the sudden increase in demand for domestic Canadian metals.

Fuller returned to Cleveland in 1880. He bought back his old company from Chisholm, renaming it the Union Rolling Mill Co. The following year, Fuller and partner Paul P. Condit formed Condit, Fuller & Co. This new firm marketed the iron and steel Fuller's mills were producing. Henry Chisholm, who had retained ownership of the Emma Furnace, spun it off as the Newburg Furnace Co. in January 1882. Fuller purchased it in August 1883 and made it part of the Union Rolling Mill Co. again.

Paul P. Condit died in February 1886, forcing Fuller to take on additional duties at the firm. To ease the workload, he brought his son, Horace A. Fuller, into the firm as a partner.

== Death ==
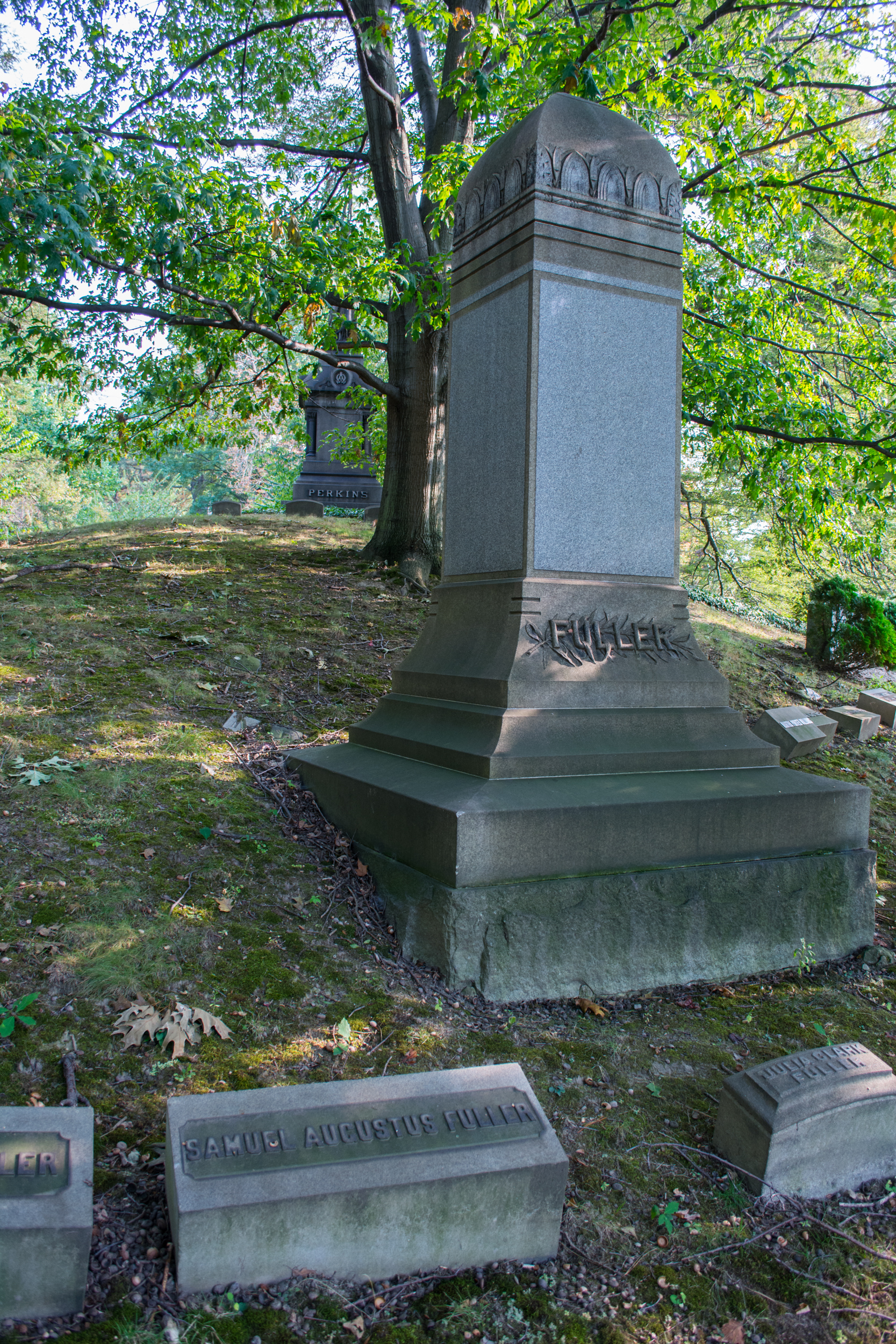
Grave of Samuel Augustus Fuller Sr. at Lake View Cemetery.

Samuel Augustus Fuller died on October 23, 1891. He had complained of feeling unwell the night before, and went to bed at about 11 P.M. He was discovered dead in his sleep from an apparent heart attack at 1:30 A.M. the following morning. He left an estate worth about $40,000 ($1,400,000 in 2025 dollars). (Note: Fuller had already settled much of his property on his older children at the time of his death. His will provided that his three younger daughters each receive $3,000 ($100,000 in 2025 dollars) in stock; that $10,000 ($400,000 in 2025 dollars) be set aside in trust, and the income on this money to be provided to his eldest son, Albert; and that $20,000 ($700,000 in 2025 dollars) be set aside in trust, and the income on this money to be provided to his wife, Louise. Each trust would expire upon their respective deaths, with the principal going to their heirs (if any).)

He was interred in the family plot at Lake View Cemetery in Cleveland. His will provided for the erection of a $1,000 ($35,400 in 2025 dollars) funerary monument at the gravesite.

== Personal life ==
Samuel Augustus Fuller amassed what The Plain Dealer newspaper called "a large fortune". He owned a home at 1120 Euclid Avenue, an exclusive area of the city known as "Millionaires' Row" and "The Showplace of America" for the vast number of homes owned by the ultra-wealthy located on the street.

Fuller was a Republican, and a lifelong Presbyterian. He enjoyed all kinds of music, and sang in the Euclid Avenue Presbyterian Church choir.

Fuller married 18-year-old Julia Elizabeth Clark of Cleveland, Ohio, on January 1, 1858. She was the daughter of Albert Clark, a local banker. The couple had 12 children: Albert Augustus (born October 30, 1858), Kate Amelia (born November 19, 1859), Willard (born January 2, 1861), Julia Clark (born September 12, 1862; died in infancy on April 10, 1864), Horace Arthur (born September 23, 1864), Helen Williams (born June 28, 1867), Samuel Augustus Jr. (born August 19, 1868), Charles Clark (born April 30, 1870; died in infancy on December 6, 1870), Mary Elizabeth (born October 15, 1871), Frances Kellogg (born April 3, 1876), Daphne Campbell (born July 20, 1877), and Emily Lyon (born April 20, 1880). Julia Fuller died on April 23, 1880, in Hamilton, Ontario, three days after giving birth to her daughter, Emily.

On August 18, 1881, Fuller married Louise Allen Wood. She was the daughter of John W. Allen, the fourth mayor of Cleveland (1841). She married Dr. George Kip Wood, a United States Army surgeon who had been widowed about 1873. She died at her home at the Hotel Roosevelt in Washington, D.C., on May 8, 1928.

== Legacy ==
Condit, Fuller & Co. became the Bourne-Fuller Co. in 1896 with the elevation of Herbert C. Bourne to partner. Bourne-Fuller purchased the Upson Nut Company and the Union Rolling Mill in November 1911. This marked the beginning of a number of acquisitions by Bourne-Fuller, and by 1929 it had merged with or purchased 18 companies.

On December 17, 1929, the Bourne-Fuller Co., Central Alloy Steel, Donner Steel, and Republic Iron and Steel merged into a new company, Republic Steel Corporation.

== Bibliography ==
- Avery, Elroy McKendree (1918). A History of Cleveland and Its Environs: The Heart of New Connecticut. Volume 3. Chicago: Lewis Publishing Co.
- Carhart, Lucy Ann Morris (1911). Nelson, Charles Alexander (ed.). Genealogy of the Morris Family: Descendants of Thomas Morris of Connecticut. New York: The A.S. Barnes Co.
- Chapman, Edmund H. (1981). Cleveland: Village to Metropolis. Cleveland: Western Reserve Historical Society. ISBN 0911704299.
- Clark, Albert (1877). Family Records of George Clark and Daniel Kellogg: With Their Descendants, Also Family Record in Part of Edward Nash. Washington, D.C.: A.C. Patterson.
- Cleveland Engineering Society (1893). Visitors' Directory to the Engineering Works and Industries of Cleveland, Ohio. Cleveland: Cleveland Engineering Society.
- General Society of Mayflower Descendants (1976). Bicentennial Register of the Society of Mayflower Descendants in the District of Columbia, 1976: In Commemoration of the 200th Anniversary of the Founding of the United States of America. Washington, D.C.: General Society of Mayflower Descendants.
- Knuttila, Kenneth Murray (1994). 'That Man Partridge': E.A. Partridge, His Thoughts and Times. Regina, Sask.: Canadian Plains Research Center. ISBN 9780889770799.
- MacKeigan, Judith A. (May 2011). "The Good People of Newburgh": Yankee Identity and Industrialization in a Cleveland Neighborhood, 1850-1992 (MA). Cleveland State University.
- Miller, Carol Poh (October 1979). Central Furnaces, US Steel Corporation. HAER OH-12 (PDF) (Report). Washington, D.C.: Historic American Engineering Record, U.S. Department of Interior.
- Ohio Secretary of State (1868). Annual Report of the Ohio Secretary of State to the Governor for the Year 1867 (Report). Columbus, Ohio: L.D. Myers & Bro., State Printers.
- Ohio Secretary of State (1882). Annual Report of the Ohio Secretary of State to the Governor for the Year 1882 (Report). Columbus, Ohio: Myers Brothers, State Printers.
- Orth, Samuel P. (1910). A History of Cleveland, Ohio. Volume 3. Chicago: S.J. Clarke Publishing.
- Progressive Men of Northern Ohio. Cleveland: Plain Dealer Publishing Co. 1906.
- Rose, William Ganson (1990). Cleveland: The Making of a City. Kent, Ohio: Kent State University Press. ISBN 9780873384285.
- Subcommittee of the Committee on Education and Labor (1939). Violations of Free Speech and Rights of Labor. Part 33: "Little Steel". Committee on Education and Labor. U.S. Senate. 75th Cong., 3d sess. Washington, D.C.: Government Printing Office. hdl:2027/uc1.$b643163.
- Swank, James Moore (1876). The Ironworks of the United States. Philadelphia: American Iron and Steel Association.
- Telgen, Diane (2005). "Major Entrepreneurs and Companies". In Hillstrom, Kevin; Hillstrom, Laurie Collier (eds.). The Industrial Revolution in America. Volume 1: Iron and Steel. Santa Barbara, Calif.: ABC-CLIO. ISBN 9781851096206.
- Upton, Harriet Taylor (1909). A Twentieth Century History of Trumbull County, Ohio: A Narrative Account of Its Historical Progress, Its People, and Its Principal Interests. Chicago: Lewis Publishing Co.
- Warren, Kenneth (1989). The American Steel Industry, 1850-1970: A Geographical Interpretation. Pittsburgh: University of Pittsburgh Press. ISBN 9780822986027.
- Wickham, Gertrude Van Rensselaer (1914). The Pioneer Families of Cleveland 1796-1840. Volume 1. Cleveland: Evangelical Publishing House.
