= USS Puritan (ID-2222) =

Passenger ship that sank in Lake Superior

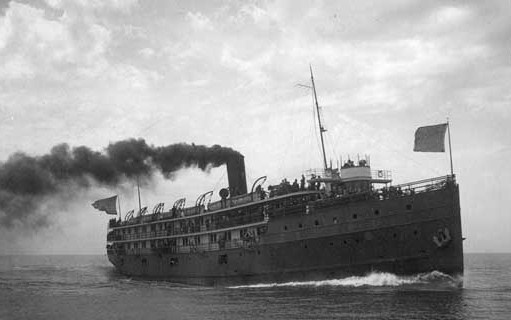
- SS Puritan prior to World War I

History

United States
- Name: SS Puritan
- Builder: Craig Shipbuilding; Toledo, Ohio
- Christened: SS Puritan
- Completed: 1901
- Acquired: April 1918 (U.S. Navy)
- Commissioned: 20 November 1918
- Decommissioned: 1919
- Renamed: George M. Cox
- Fate: Sunk 1933

General characteristics
- Type: Commercial steamship
- Displacement: 1,762 tons
- Length: 233 ft (71 m) 1901; 259 ft (79 m) 1908
- Beam: 40.5 ft (12.3 m)
- Speed: 15.6 knots (28.9 km/h; 18.0 mph)
- GEORGE M. COX
- U.S. National Register of Historic Places
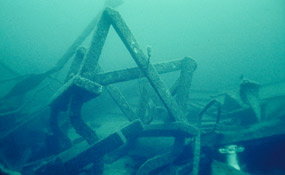
- Diving the wreckage

- Location within Michigan Location within the United States
- Location: Near Rock of Ages Light, Isle Royale National Park Michigan
- Coordinates: 47°51.462′N 89°19.385′W
- Area: 206.6 acres (83.6 ha)
- MPS: Shipwrecks of Isle Royale National Park TR
- NRHP reference No.: 84001749
- Added to NRHP: 14 June 1984

USS Puritan, a civilian transport built by Craig Shipbuilding Company in Toledo, Ohio, was launched in 1901, and lengthened by 26 ft (7.9 m) in 1908. The ship sailed on the Great Lakes in passenger service, was purchased by the U.S. Navy at the end of the war, and returned to passenger service after the war. The ship sank in 1933 near Isle Royale in Lake Superior, and its wreck is listed on the National Register of Historic Places.

== Civilian service prior to World War I ==
She mainly operated on Lake Michigan in passenger service between Chicago, Holland, and Benton Harbor.

== USS Puritan ==
Puritan was purchased by the U.S. Navy during World War I in April 1918 and commissioned on 20 November 1918. Although she was suitable for coastal transport in the English Channel, she may have never left the Great Lakes in naval service. Puritan was decommissioned in 1919 and sold to a firm in Chicago.

== Civilian service after World War I ==
She went back into passenger service from Chicago to other ports on the Great Lakes from 1920 to 1929. At the start of the Great Depression, she was laid up.

== George M. Cox ==
Puritan was purchased in the 1930s by George Cox, who was an entrepreneur from New Orleans, and refitted in an elegant manner. In 1933 the ship was renamed George M. Cox. On her first cruise with a contingent of special guests, she struck the shoals near the Rock of Ages Light in fog on 27 May 1933. The 127 passengers and crew were rescued and spent the night in the crowded lighthouse and on the surrounding rocks. The ship was not salvageable and remained on the rocks until it was broken up in an October storm. It sank near the wrecks of Cumberland and Henry Chisholm. The wreck sits in 10–100 feet (3.0–30.5 m) of water and is a popular dive site. Approximately 65 dives were made to George M. Cox in 2009 out of 1,062 dives made to wrecks in the Isle Royale National Park.

== National Register of Historic Places ==
The wreck of George M. Cox was named to the National Register of Historic Places on 14 June 1984, No. 84001749. It is discussed along with other nearby wrecks in Shipwrecks of Isle Royale National Park, TR.
