= PS Cumberland =

Wooden-hulled side paddlewheeler wrecked in Lake Superior

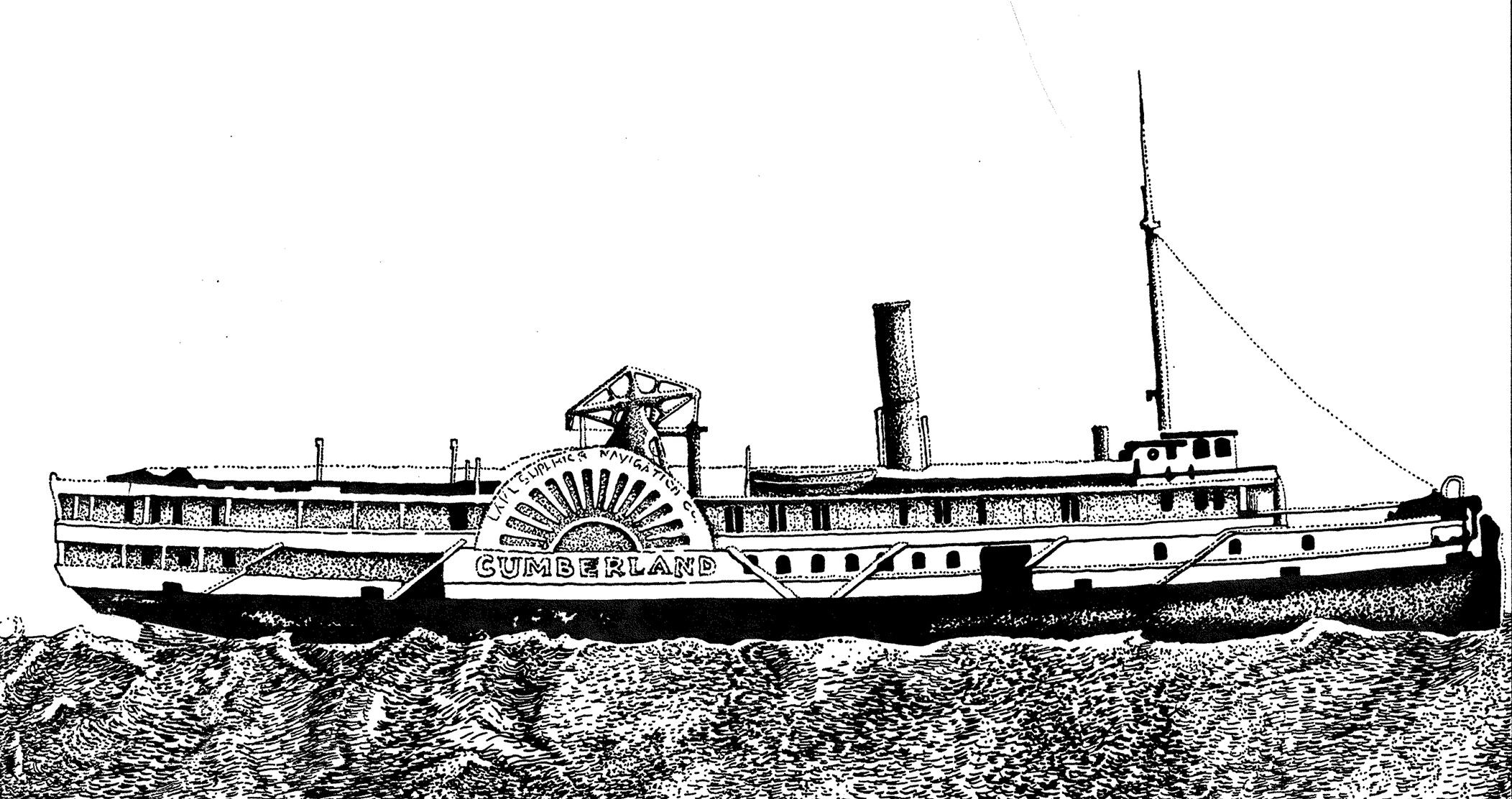

History

Canada
- Name: Cumberland
- Operator: Toronto and Lake Superior Navigation Company
- Builder: Melanchthan & Simpson
- Launched: August 8, 1871
- Fate: Sank 1877

General characteristics
- Type: Side paddlewheeler
- Tonnage: 750 GRT
- Length: 214 ft (65 m)
- Beam: 28 ft (8.5 m)
- Draft: 10.5 ft (3.2 m)
- Installed power: 400 hp (300 kW)
- Propulsion: walking beam engine
- CUMBERLAND
- U.S. National Register of Historic Places
- Location within Michigan Location within the United States
- Location: Near Rock of Ages Light, Isle Royale National Park, Michigan
- Coordinates: 47°51.465′N 89°19.650′W
- Area: 206.6 acres (83.6 ha)
- Built: 1871
- Architect: Melanchthan & Simpson
- Architectural style: Side paddlewheeler
- MPS: Shipwrecks of Isle Royale National Park TR
- NRHP reference No.: 84001732
- Added to NRHP: June 14, 1984

Cumberland was a wooden-hulled side paddlewheeler built in 1871; it was wrecked off the shore of Isle Royale in Lake Superior in 1877 and the remains are still on the lake bottom. The wreck was placed on the National Register of Historic Places in 1984.

== History ==
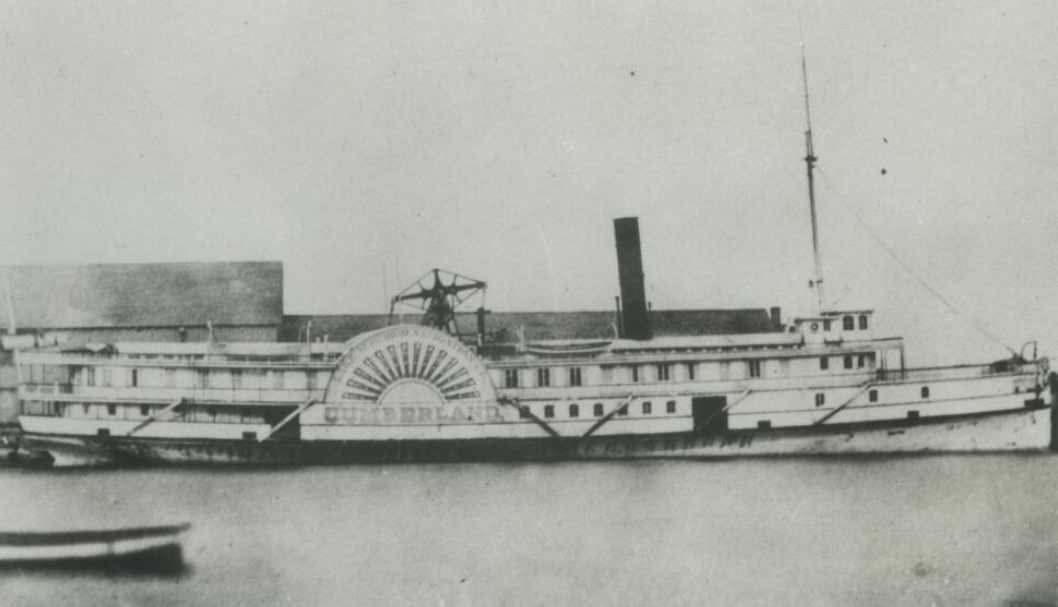
The Cumberland prior to her sinking

The Cumberland was constructed in 1871 by Melanchthan & Simpson of Port Robinson, Ontario for Perry & Company, a Toronto steamship line. The ship was launched on August 8, 1871. The Cumberland's design was typical of the sidewheel steamers built for Great Lakes travel in the 1840s-1880s. It was a wooden-hulled, sidewheel paddleboat, 208 feet in length at the keel and 214 feet in length total. The ship had a beam of 28 feet (48 feet overall), a draft of 10 feet 6 inches, and measured 750 tons gross. The ship was powered by a 400HP walking beam engine with a single boiler and possessed paddlewheels 30 feet in diameter.

The Cumberland was built for Northern Railway of Canada, the parent company of the Toronto and Lake Superior Navigation Company, to run between Duluth, Minnesota and Collingwood or Owen Sound, Ontario, and was named For Fred W. Cumberland, Northern Railway's general manager. The ship first saw service in May 1871.

During its service, the Cumberland was involved in a number of serious incidents. In November 1872, the ship was frozen in the ice in the St. Mary's River; most of the crew trekked on foot from the ship to Collingwood, Ontario; leaving a few crewmembers and passengers on the vessel. The fate of those left aboard is not known, but it is likely the ship overwintered in the ice. In November 1874, the Cumberland was caught in a storm on its way to Thunder Bay. Caulking of the ship's hull came loose in several areas, and it began to take on water. To lighten the load, livestock on the deck was thrown overboard. The ship made it to port with six feet of water in the hold and promptly sank. In November 1875, the Cumberland was again caught in a storm, and was grounded near Silver Islet, Ontario. Luckily, there was little damage from this incident, and cargo and passengers soon arrived safely in Thunder Bay. In September 1876, the ship ran aground again, this time at Owen Sound.

== Final voyage ==
In July 1877, the Cumberland was grounded for three days on a sand bar in the harbor at Nipigon. It arrived in Thunder Bay on July 24, three days behind schedule, and probably left the same day. However, once out of port, she began taking on water. The day was clear and dry, and passengers were transferred to another vessel. On July 25, 1877, the ship struck a reef near the Rock of Ages Light. The bow section of the ship was stuck on solid aground. Other ships attempted to free the Cumberland, but she was stuck fast.

Salvage operations began, with a number of tugs and other vessels attempting to save the ship. However, the wreck was rapidly deteriorating, and by August 12 salvage operations were given up. The ship broke apart entirely on August 18; sections remained visible for several weeks, but the ship was completely submerged by early September.

== Wrecksite ==
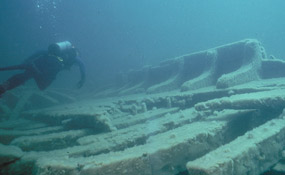
Diving the wreck of the Cumberland

Large portions of the ship remain in 20 to 80 feet of water, including the wooden hull, side-wheel, and boiler. However, most of the superstructure is missing, as well as nearly all of the engine. The wreckage of the Cumberland is intermingled with some portions of the hull of the Henry Chisholm, which sank later in 1898, and not far from the remains of the George M. Cox. Approximately 40 dives were made to the Cumberland in 2009 out of 1,062 dives made to wrecks in the Isle Royale National Park. The ship is significant as the only known example of this size, style, and age of ship available in Lake Superior as a shipwreck.
