= Henry Chisholm =

American businessman (1822–1881)

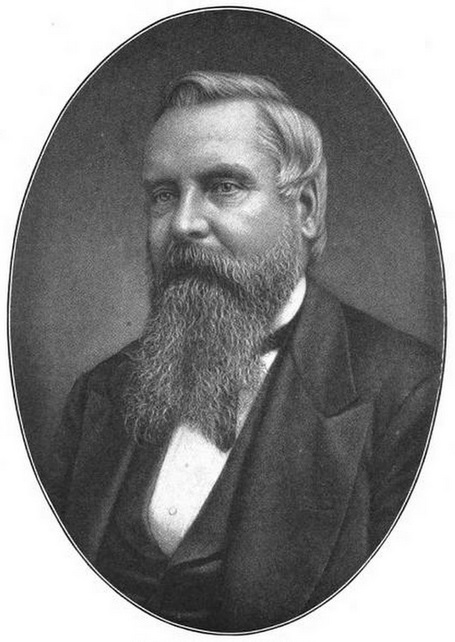
- Henry Chisholm
- Born: April 22, 1822; Lochgelly, Fife, Scotland
- Died: May 9, 1881 (aged 59); Cleveland, Ohio, U.S.
- Occupations: Iron and steel industry executive
- Spouse: Jean Allen Chisholm
- Children: 8

Henry Chisholm (April 22, 1822 – May 9, 1881) was a Scottish American businessman and steel industry executive during the Gilded Age in the United States. A resident of Cleveland, Ohio, he purchased a small, struggling iron foundry which became the Cleveland Rolling Mill, one of the largest steel firms in the nation. He is known as the "father of the Cleveland steel trade".

== Early life ==
Henry Chisholm was born in Lochgelly, Fife, Scotland, on April 22, 1822. His father, Stewart Chisholm, was a mining engineer. The Chisholms were a respectable, lower-middle-class family, and Henry was educated in the local public schools. His father died when he was ten years old, and he left school at the age of 12 to take a position as an apprentice carpenter. He was elevated to journeyman carpenter at the age of 17, and moved to Glasgow.

When he was 20 years old, Chisholm emigrated to Montréal, Québec, Canada. He arrived in the city practically penniless. He worked in Montréal as a carpenter and construction contractor until 1849, constructing various buildings and other works up and down the St. Lawrence River. He established his own construction business, which in time became one of the largest in the city.

== Cleveland and the steel industry ==
In 1850, Chisholm won a contract to build a breakwater (Note: At least one source claims Chisholm built a brickworks.) for docks of the Cleveland and Pittsburgh Railroad, which was in the process of completing its line into Cleveland and through the city to its rail yard on the shores of Lake Erie. (Note: The company had been organized in 1836 as the Cleveland, Warren, and Pittsburgh Railroad. But no route was identified until the company was reorganized in March 1847 as the C&P. The route opened in 1851.) The breakwater was completed in 1853, and Chisholm won several more contracts to build docks and piers in the city. By 1857, he had amassed a fortune worth $25,000 ($900,000 in 2025 dollars).

=== Cleveland Rolling Mill ===
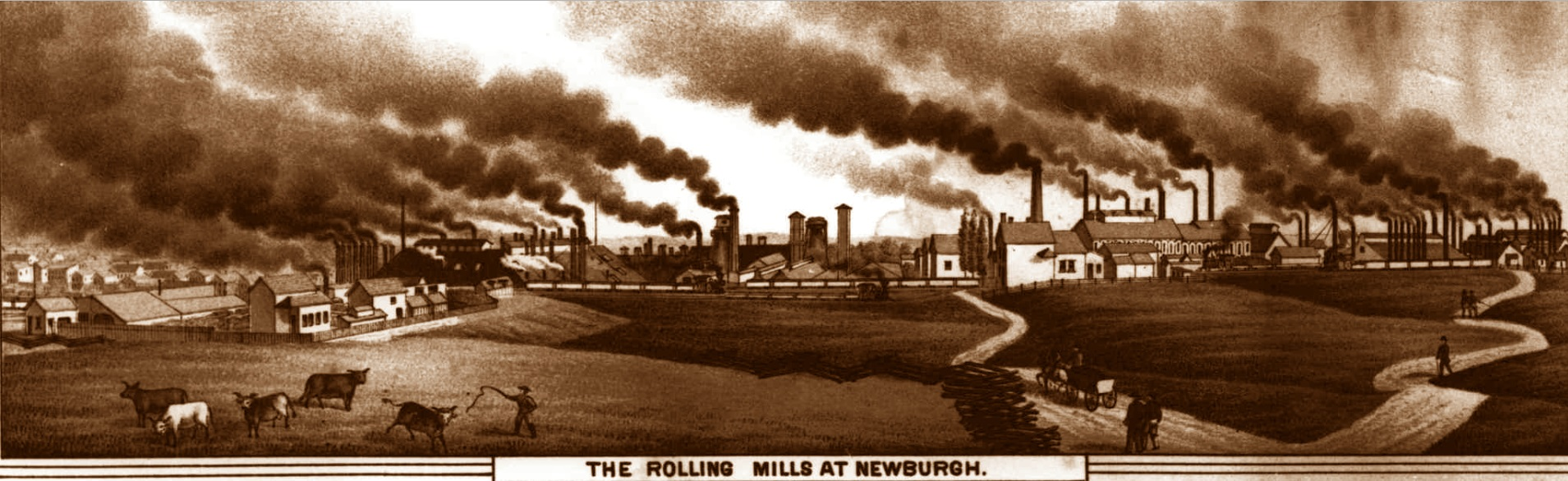
Drawing depicting the Cleveland Rolling Mill's Newburgh Works in 1885.

What would, in time, become the Cleveland Rolling Mill was established by brothers and Welsh immigrants David and John Jones in 1856 to manufacture flat bottomed railway rails. The brothers ran out of money that same year, and shut down. Henry Chisholm and his brother, William, made a major investment in the Jones plant in 1857, and the company was renamed Chisholm, Jones and Co. (Note: Sources differ as to the new name. One source says the name was Chisholm & Jones.) The plant was expanded and began rerolling iron flanged railway rails into flat bottomed rails. In 1860, Amasa Stone and his brother, Andros, made a further investment in the company, which took the name Stone, Chisholm & Jones. The new capital enabled to firm to add a blast furnace and puddling plant, which opened in 1859. A second blast furnace was added in 1860. It was the first blast furnace to operate in the Cleveland region.

On November 9, 1862, Stone, Chisholm & Jones reorganized and became the Cleveland Rolling Mill after receiving investments from Henry B. Payne, Jeptha Wade, and Stillman Witt. The company built a 60-foot (18 m) high, 16-foot (4.9 m) wide blast furnace in 1864 near the west end of what is now Saxe Avenue, and the following year erected its first Bessemer converter. This made the Cleveland Rolling Mill only the second Bessemer steel works in the United States.

Cleveland Rolling Mill expanded its presence in 1868 with the construction of the Newburgh Steel Works (Note: Sometimes spelled "Newburg Works.) next to its existing plant. The new works included an open hearth Bessemer furnace; it was the first continuous open hearth Bessemer furnace west of the Allegheny Mountains and only the fifth such furnace in the nation. By the end of 1872, the combined Cleveland plants had two puddling mills; two blast furnaces; two Bessemer converters; a boiler plate mill; two rail and rod mills; a wire mill; and a bolt, nut, and spike manufacturing shop. The Newburgh plants were producing so much pig iron, cast iron, and steel that Cleveland Rolling Mill became one of the principal metalworks in the state.

Cleveland Rolling Mill continued to expand in the last two decades of the century. In April 1880, the firm issued new stock to double its capitalization, purchased the "Canal Tract" from John D. Rockefeller, (Note: This tract (of uncertain original acreage) occupied the east bank of the Cuyahoga River and was bounded by Wheeling Bend of the river on the north, the Jefferson Avenue bridge on the south, and the tracks of the Cleveland and Mahoning Valley Railroad to the east.) built the Central Furnaces on the site from 1881 to 1882 In 1882, the firm erected a Garrett rod mill, the first of its kind anywhere in the world. (Note: William Garrett, an engineer with the company, had developed a rod manufacturing process which quintupled productivity.)

=== Other steel interests ===
In 1864, Chisholm purchased the Lake Shore Rolling Mill, an iron and steel works which had been constructed on the shore of Lake Erie at Wason Street (now E. 38th Street).

In 1871, Chisholm, Charles Crumb Jr., and five other investors, co-founded the King Iron Bridge Company. That same year, Chisholm founded the Union Rolling Mill of Chicago, and put his son, William, in charge of the plant. He also erected a rolling mill at Decatur, Illinois, which included two blast furnaces to furnish the Chicago plant with pig iron. Chisholm sold his interest in the Chicago firm in 1879.

To supply his mills with iron ore, Chisholm also invested in iron mines in Michigan, which in time employed more than 300 workers. His companies eventually controlled much of the raw material the mills used.

=== Steel legacy ===
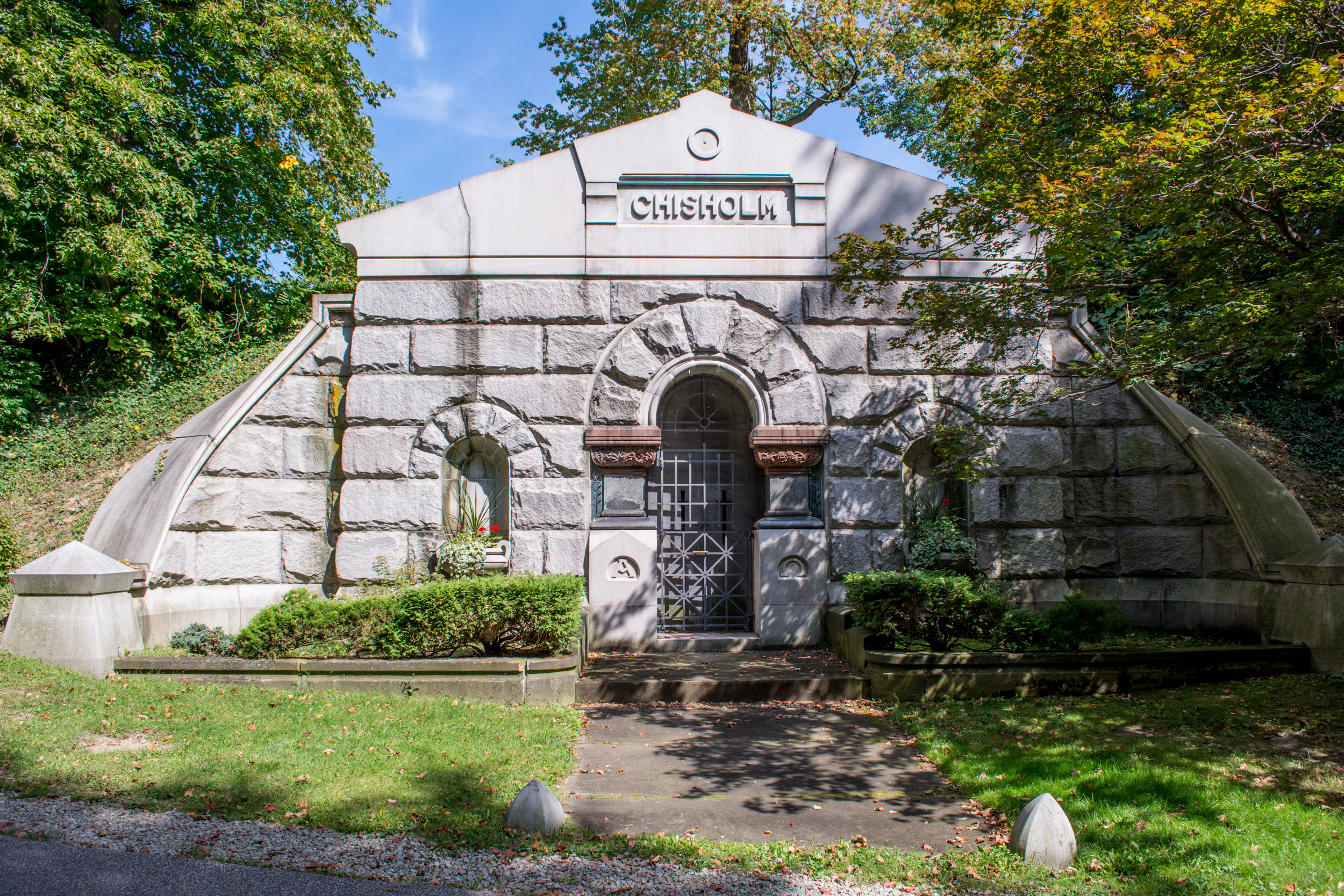
The Chisholm mausoleum at Lake View Cemetery.

Unlike fellow Scottish American immigrant and steel magnate Andrew Carnegie, whose career and Chisholm's mirrored one another, Henry Chisholm focused on eliminating waste in iron and steel manufacturing rather than lowering the cost of production. Chisholm pioneered the reuse of scrap in steel production. His plants were the first to successfully roll rods and wire from steel, and in 1871 his plants produced the first steel screws.

At the time of his death, Chisholm's companies employed more than 8,000 people and were generating about $25 million ($834,100,000 in 2025 dollars) a year in revenue.

During his life and since, Chisholm was called the "father of the Cleveland steel trade", and historians consider him the most prominent person in the history of the Cleveland iron and steel industry. Historian William E. Van Vugt has called Chisholm one of the most "outstanding" Scottish immigrants in American history both for his "historical significance" and for being one of the most successful at business.

=== Other interests ===
Henry Chisholm also invested heavily in bank and manufacturing stocks. He was elected a director at three of Cleveland's largest banks, including the Second National Bank.

Chisholm was active in both religious and charitable affairs, and was a director of four charitable institutions in Cleveland.

== Personal life ==
Chilsholm married Jean Allen of Dunfermline, Scotland, when he was about 17 years old. The couple had several children: William (born May 22, 1843); Catharine Arnot (born June 30, 1845); Stewart H. (born December 21, 1846); Wilson B. (born July 26, 1848); and Janet (born January 1, 1851). Two sons, Henry and Stewart, died in infancy; a daughter, Christina, died at the age of four.

Chisholm was a lifelong Baptist. He was a member of the Second Baptist Church of Cleveland (later known as the Euclid Avenue Baptist Church). He and his friend and fellow church member, John D. Rockefeller, made the largest contributions when the church erected its new building in 1871.

== Death ==
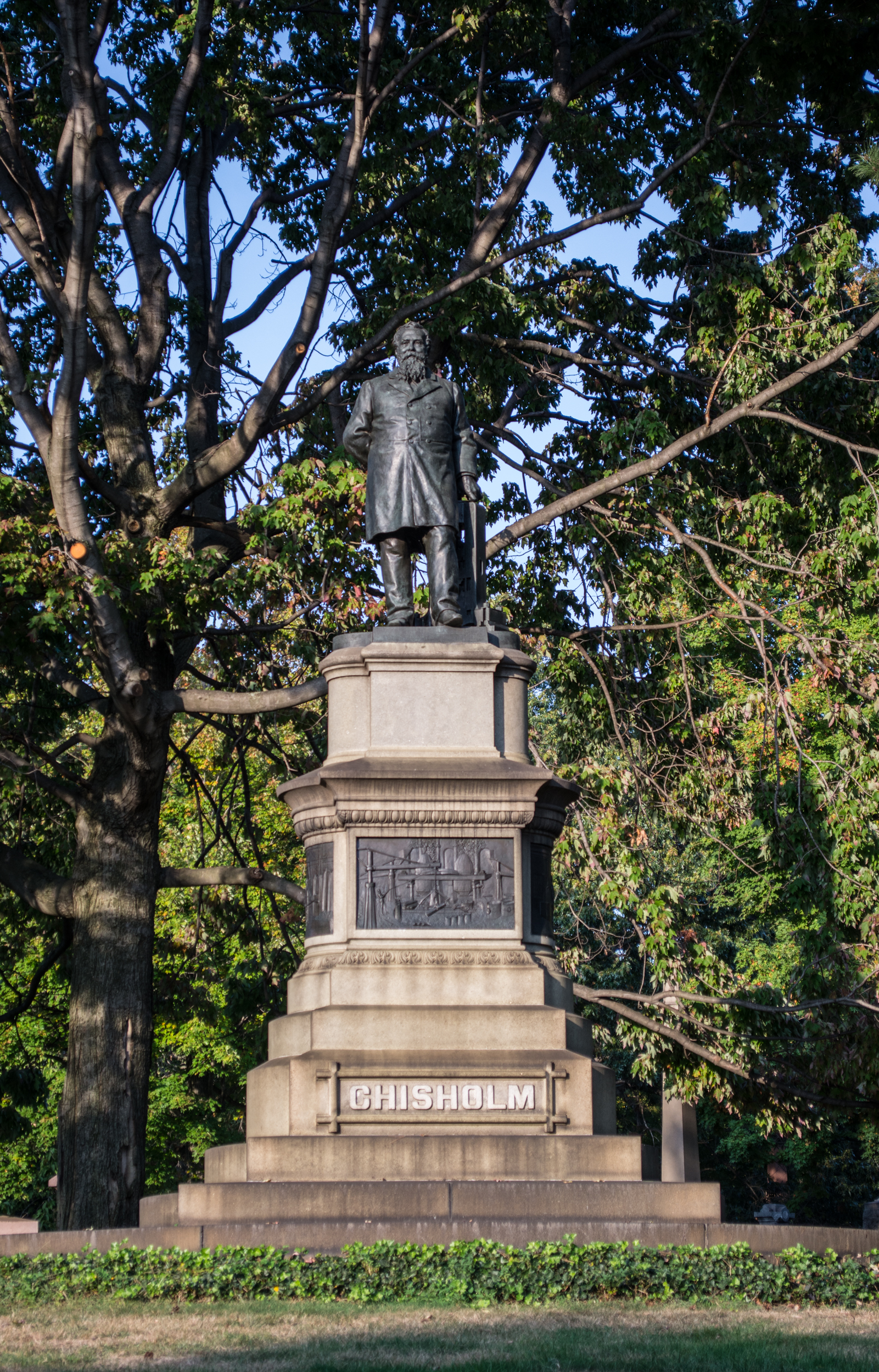
Henry Chisholm memorial at Lake View Cemetery.

After a three week long unspecified illness, Henry Chisholm died at his home in Cleveland on May 9, 1881. Several hundred of the city's most important citizens attended the funeral, which was held at Chisholm's home. More than 4,000 employees of the Cleveland Rolling Mill filed past the home during the funeral.

Chisholm was temporarily interred at Woodland Cemetery in Cleveland. A family mausoleum was constructed at Cleveland's Lake View Cemetery. The Chisholm family vault, which has 45 crypts, was (as of 2016) the largest mausoleum at the cemetery. (Note: The mausoleum underwent conservation and restoration in 1998 and 2001. It won an award for the latter effort.)

== Legacy ==
Henry Chisholm erected a Tuscan Villa style mansion at 408 Euclid Avenue in Cleveland. The mansion ranked among the city's finest homes. His neighbors included Samuel Livingston Mather Sr., John D. Rockefeller, Amasa Stone, and Jeptha Wade. This and other magnificent homes helped Euclid Avenue earn the nicknames "Prosperity Row" and "Millionaires' Row" for the large number of extremely wealthy people who lived on the street.

In 1880, Alva Bradley commissioned a wooden, screw-driven freighter, which was named the SS Henry Chisholm in Chisholm's honor. The ship was lost on October 20, 1898, after hitting a reef near Rock of Ages Light off Isle Royale in Lake Superior. The wreck was placed on the National Register of Historic Places in 1984.

In November 1881, workers at the Cleveland Rolling Mill and citizens of Cleveland's 18th Ward (in which the mill was located) began an effort to erect a statue in Chisholm's honor. A fundraising committee, led by local industrialists Jeptha Wade, John Walker, Joseph Perkins, William F. Thompson, and W.E. Way, raised more than $8,800 ($300,000 in 2025 dollars) from 5,000 workers and citizens to build the monument. Cincinnati sculptor Charles Henry Niehaus was selected to design and sculpt the piece. Niehaus completed his work fairly swiftly, and exhibited a model in Cleveland in May 1882. The statue and bas-relief panels were cast by a Cincinnati foundry. The work was erected just inside the Euclid Avenue entrance of Lake View Cemetery on December 6, 1884. Senator Henry B. Payne and Ohio railroad executive John H. Devereux spoke at the unveiling. The memorial depicts a larger-than-life size statue of Henry Chisholm, his left hand resting on a small-scale model of a steel rolling mechanism. Bas-relief panels on three sides of the pedestal depict the conversion of iron ore into steel.

== Bibliography ==
- Avery, Elroy McKendree (1918). A History of Cleveland and Its Environs: The Heart of New Connecticut. Volume 2. Chicago: Lewis Publishing Co.
- Brainard, Lucy Abigail (1908). The Genealogy of the Brainerd-Brainard Family in America, 1649-1908. Volume 1, Parts 1-3. Hartford, Conn.: The Case, Lockwood and Brainard Co.
- Camp, Mark J. (2007). Railroad Depots of Northeast Ohio. Charleston, S.C.: Arcadia Publishing. ISBN 9780738551159.
- Cleveland Engineering Society (1893). Visitors' Directory to the Engineering Works and Industries of Cleveland, Ohio. Cleveland: Cleveland Engineering Society.
- Downs, Winfield Scott (1934). Encyclopedia of American Biography. New York: The American Historical Society.
- Dutka, Alan F. (2015). Misfortune on Cleveland's Millionaires' Row. Charleston, S.C.: The History Press. ISBN 9781467117982.
- Ehle, Jay C.; Ellis, William Donohue; Schneider, Nancy A. (1996). Cleveland's Harbor: The Cleveland-Cuyahoga County Port Authority. Kent, Ohio: Kent State University Press. ISBN 9780873385435.
- Euclid Avenue Baptist Church (1927). Historical Sketches: Seventy-Five Years of the Euclid Avenue Baptist Church, Cleveland, Ohio, 1851-1926. Cleveland: Davis & Cannon.
- Goulder, Grace (1972). John D. Rockefeller: The Cleveland Years. Cleveland: Western Reserve Historical Society. ISBN 9780911704099.
- Ingham, John N. (1983). Biographical Dictionary of American Business Leaders. Volume 1: A-G. Westport, Conn.: Greenwood Press. ISBN 9780313239076.
- Lupold, Harry Forrest; Haddad, Gladys (1988). "The Transition Years: Slavery, the Civil War, and the Reserve in National Politics, 1850-1880". In Lupold, Harry Forrest; Haddad, Gladys (eds.). Ohio's Western Reserve: A Regional Reader. Kent, Ohio: Kent State University Press. ISBN 9780873383639.
- MacKeigan, Judith A. (May 2011). "The Good People of Newburgh": Yankee Identity and Industrialization in a Cleveland Neighborhood, 1850-1992 (MA). Cleveland State University.
- Miller, Carol Poh (October 1979). Central Furnaces, US Steel Corporation. HAER OH-12 (PDF) (Report). Washington, D.C.: Historic American Engineering Record, U.S. Department of Interior.
- Miller, Carol Poh; Wheeler, Robert A. (1997). Cleveland: A Concise History, 1796-1996. Bloomington, Ind.: Indiana University Press. ISBN 9780253211477.
- Ohio Commissioner of Railroads and Telegraphs (1882). Annual Report of the Commissioner of Railroads and Telegraphs of Ohio for the Year Ending June 30, 1881 (Report). Columbus, Ohio: G.J. Brand & Co., State Printers.
- Ohio Division of Geological Survey (1884). Report of the Geological Survey of Ohio. Volume 5: Economic Survey (Report). Columbus, Ohio: J.G. Brand & Co., State Printers.
- Orth, Samuel P. (1910). A History of Cleveland, Ohio. Volume 3. Chicago: S.J. Clarke Publishing.
- Rose, William Ganson (1990). Cleveland: The Making of a City. Kent, Ohio: Kent State University Press. ISBN 9780873384285.
- Swank, James Moore (1876). The Ironworks of the United States. Philadelphia: American Iron and Steel Association.
- Swank, James Moore (1884). History of the Manufacture of Iron in All Ages. Philadelphia: American Iron and Steel Association.
- Telgen, Diane (2005). "Major Entrepreneurs and Companies". In Hillstrom, Kevin; Hillstrom, Laurie Collier (eds.). The Industrial Revolution in America. Volume 1: Iron and Steel. Santa Barbara, Calif.: ABC-CLIO. ISBN 9781851096206.
- Van Tassel, David D.; Vacha, John (2005). 'Behind Bayonets': The Civil War in Northern Ohio. Kent, Ohio: Kent State University Press. ISBN 9780873388504.
- Van Vugt, William E. (2006). British Buckeyes: The English, Scots, and Welsh in Ohio, 1700-1900. Kent, Ohio: Kent State University Press. ISBN 9780873388436.
- Warren, Kenneth (1989). The American Steel Industry, 1850-1970: A Geographical Interpretation. Pittsburgh: University of Pittsburgh Press. ISBN 9780822986027.
