= Washington Island (Michigan) =

Island in Michigan, United States

- Location within Michigan

Geography
- Location: Lake Superior; Isle Royale National Park
- Coordinates: 47°52′30″N 89°15′00″W
- Area: 1 sq mi (2.6 km^{2})

Administration
- United States
- State: Michigan
- County: Keweenaw County
- Township: Eagle Harbor Township

Demographics
- Population: Uninhabited

Washington Island is an uninhabited island in Lake Superior. It is within the boundary of Keweenaw County and Isle Royale National Park, a national park located within the U.S. state of Michigan. It is the westernmost point marked on most maps of the elongated archipelago that makes up this park. However, a small islet called Bottle Island and an even smaller shoal that breaks the lake surface, Rock of Ages, are located further westward.

Washington Island is approximately 2 mi (3.2 km) long and 0.5 mi (0.80 km) wide. Like the rest of the Isle Royale archipelago, the island is an ancient ridge of basalt oriented from the southwest to the northeast.

Washington Island is separated by Grace Harbor from Isle Royale. It has relatively low visitation, with the majority of day trippers being sea kayakers from nearby Windigo Ranger Station. The waters of Lake Superior around Washington Island are notoriously dangerous, however, and inexperienced kayakers are not encouraged to navigate them.

Many Great Lakes boats and lake freighters have succumbed to the stormy waters that surround Washington Island. The nearby 1908 lighthouse and light tower, Rock of Ages Light, tries to warn boats away from these dangerous waters. The federal government has also constructed a radio beacon tower on Washington Island's eastern tip, facing Isle Royale.

Passenger ferry vessels that circumnavigate the Isle Royale archipelago use Grace Harbor as a navigable sound, and pass close by Washington Island.

== Points of interest ==
- Rock of Ages Light
