= Bourne-Fuller Company =

American steel company

The Bourne-Fuller Company in Cleveland, Ohio, was one of three constituent companies that formed the Republic Steel Corporation in 1930. The other companies were the Central Alloy Company and Republic Iron and Steel Company. The principal stockholder of Republic was Cyrus Eaton, a well-known financier who made a fortune, in part, through Republic Steel.

With the combination of these two companies with Republic Steel Corporation, Republic became the third largest steel company in the United States after U.S. Steel Company and the Bethlehem Steel Company. At the time of its combination with Bourne-Fuller and Central Alloy, Republic was headquartered in Youngstown, Ohio. In 1936 it moved its headquarters to Cleveland, Ohio.

== History ==
Before it combined with Republic, Bourne-Fuller consisted of three entities: first was Bourne-Fuller Company, the sales agency or iron and steel jobber, which sold the output of its furnaces to its customers. The other two entities consisted of the Union Rolling Mill, a manufacturer of steel, and the Upson Nut Company, a manufacturer of nuts and bolts.

Bourne-Fuller acquired these two companies in 1920, although the three companies had already formed an alliance in 1911 to be “able to fight the United States Steel Corporation.” Bourne-Fuller Company wanted to purchase Upson Nut so that it would own a furnace.

These three companies were the largest independent steel companies in Ohio. The president of Bourne-Fuller Co., was B.F. Bourne, Horace A. Fuller was vice president (and president of Union Rolling Mill Co.). Horace Fuller's father, Samuel Augustus Fuller, was founder and president of Condit Fuller & Co., which became Bourne-Fuller & Co., after Mr. Paul P. Condit's death in 1886.

In 1912-1913 Anton Burchard designed the six-story brick and reinforced concrete office building for Upson and the one-story brick and steel forge shop.

In 1920, when Bourne-Fuller Company purchased Upson Nut and Union Rolling Mill, it added seven four and five story buildings designed and built by H.K. Ferguson Company on line with the 1913 forge shop. “The operations of the three companies include the entire process of steel manufacture extending from the making of pig iron to the manufacture of finished steel, structural, bars, plates, billets and finished products including nuts, bolts, rivets and the like.”

"The Union Rolling Mill was built in 1861 and 1862 to roll merchant bar iron." It was located a mile outside the center of Cleveland in the Newburgh township. Its excellent location, which covered seven acres of ground, was a part of the Newburgh township cemetery annexed by the City of Cleveland for the rapidly expanding steel industry in 1873. Union Rolling Mill and a railroad purchased the cemetery, moving more than 3,000 burials to a new place in 1881-1882.

“The mill employed 400 hands, covered seven acres of ground, and had a daily capacity of 120 tons of finished iron. . . With a capital of $500,000, the Mill’s annual capacity, with the remodeled Emma Furnace, was 55,000 net tons producing Bessemer foundry and forge pig iron. Its “daily capacity is 120 tons of finished iron . . . The specialties are “‘Union Refined’ bar, and cold-straightened shafting.”

In 1930 Republic Steel shut down the Union Rolling Mill and transferred its production to its Youngstown plants. At that time the plant had an annual capacity of 350,000 tons of steel ingots in its five furnaces. It disbanded its loading docks and other maritime equipment on Lake Erie. The steel needed for Bourne-Fuller's finishing company, the Upson Nut Company was supplied by Republic's Youngstown plant.

In 1893 Cleveland's production of nuts and bolts surpassed all other American cities. Upson Nut Company (in 1864 it was called the Union Nut Company) was a foremost maker of cold and hot pressed and forged nuts, bolts and washers.

Finished steel was delivered from Republic's Youngstown plant to Upson's plant on 1970 Carter Road in Cleveland. Bourne-Fuller then became the nut and bolt division of Republic. Republic consolidated its operations by closing or revamping its smaller plants of which Bourne-Fuller was one, although with Upson's open hearths in downtown Cleveland and a capacity of 240,000 tons a year of ingot steel production, it gave Republic a bolt and nut manufacturing business. In 1984, Republic Steel was merged with Jones Laughlin Steel Company to form LTV Steel and ultimately, the Upson Nut Plant was shut down.

== Founders and executives ==
Samuel Augustus Fuller founded and was president of Condit Fuller Company which became known as Bourne-Fuller Company. In 1881, Samuel A. Fuller began another venture known as Condit Fuller & Co., on Water Street. It was the sales office for iron and steel. His son, Horace Arthur Fuller, entered the partnership in 1883. The company changed the name of Condit Fuller Company to the Bourne-Fuller Company soon after Paul P. Condit died in 1886. (The company name was changed in approximately 1892.) The sales firm was first located on Water Street in Cleveland and later the office was moved to River and Main Streets, also in Cleveland.

Bourne-Fuller Co. was represented by James Dempsey of Squires Samuel & Dempsey, a leading Cleveland law firm. Dempsey, who was a director of Bourne-Fuller, was married to the sister of Irwin Bourne of Bourne-Fuller.

Horace Fuller went on to become treasurer and president of Union Rolling Mill Co., in 1911, as well as president of Bourne-Fuller & Co. in 1912 and president of Upson Nut. Horace Fuller held these positions until he died in 1924 at the age of 60.

== Sources ==
- Avery, Elroy McKendree (1918), A History of Cleveland and Its Environs Volume 3; Biography, Lewis Publishing Company
- Orth, Samuel Peter (1910), A History of Cleveland, Ohio: Biographical, S.J. Clarke Publishing Company
