= SS Henry Chisholm =

Wooden freighter wrecked in isle royale

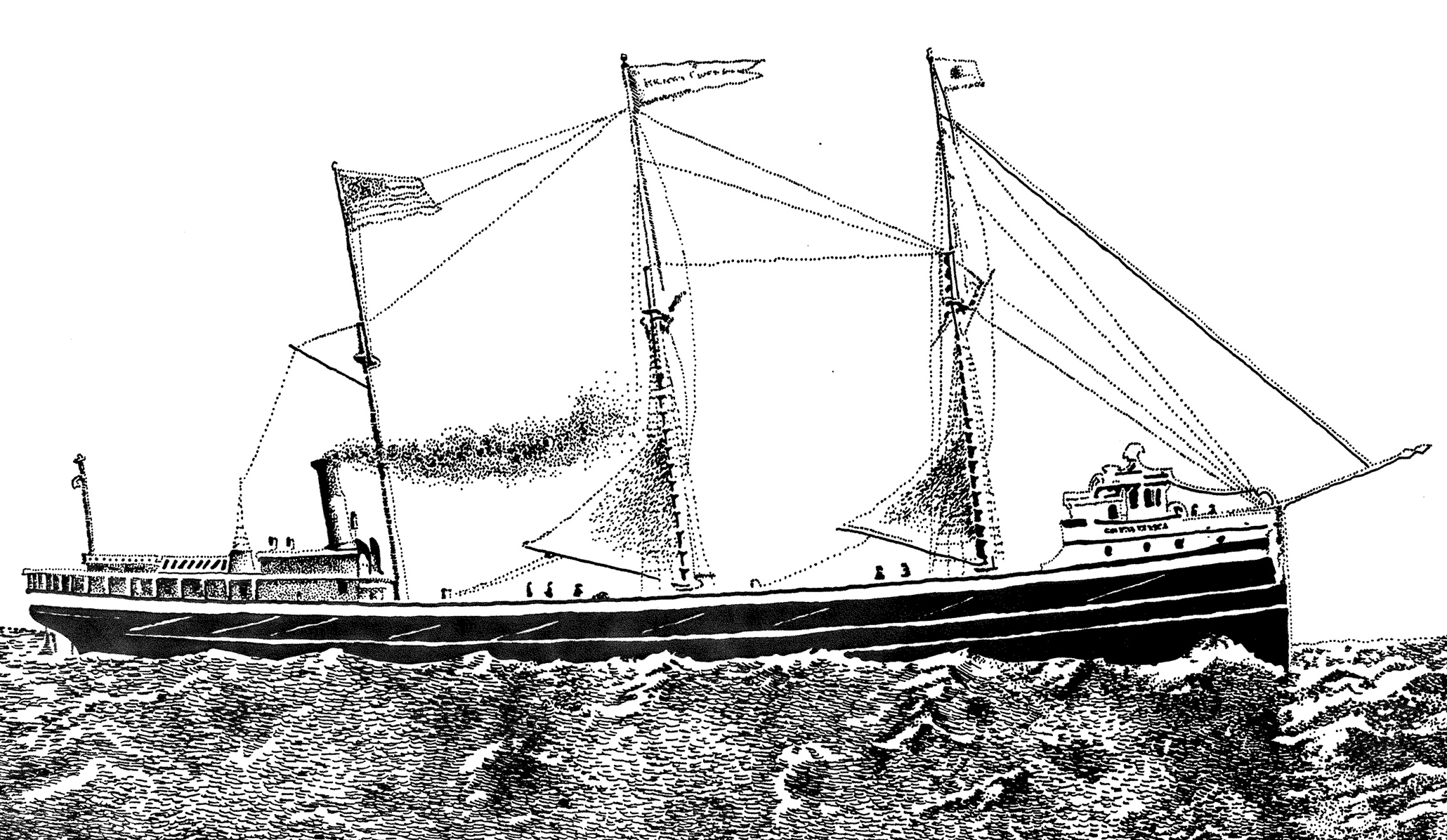

History

United States
- Name: Henry Chisholm
- Builder: Thomas Quayle & Sons
- Launched: August 28, 1880
- Out of service: 1898
- Fate: Sunk off the shore of Isle Royale in Lake Superior

General characteristics
- Type: Wooden freighter
- Length: 265 ft (81 m)
- Beam: 39 ft (12 m)
- Depth: 20 ft (6.1 m)
- Installed power: 1,707 hp (1,273 kW)
- Propulsion: double expansion steam engine
- Notes: Official number 95610
- HENRY CHISHOLM
- U.S. National Register of Historic Places
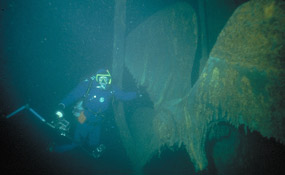
- Diving the wreckage

- Location within Michigan Location within the United States
- Location: Near Rock of Ages Light, Isle Royale National Park, Michigan
- Coordinates: 47°51.459′N 89°19.679′W
- Area: 206.6 acres (83.6 ha)
- Built: 1880
- Architect: Thomas Quayle & Sons; John Drackett
- Architectural style: Freighter
- MPS: Shipwrecks of Isle Royale National Park TR
- NRHP reference No.: 84001752
- Added to NRHP: June 14, 1984

Henry Chisholm was a wooden freighter that sank off the shore of Isle Royale in Lake Superior in 1898 and the remains are still on the lake bottom. The wreck was placed on the National Register of Historic Places in 1984.

== History ==
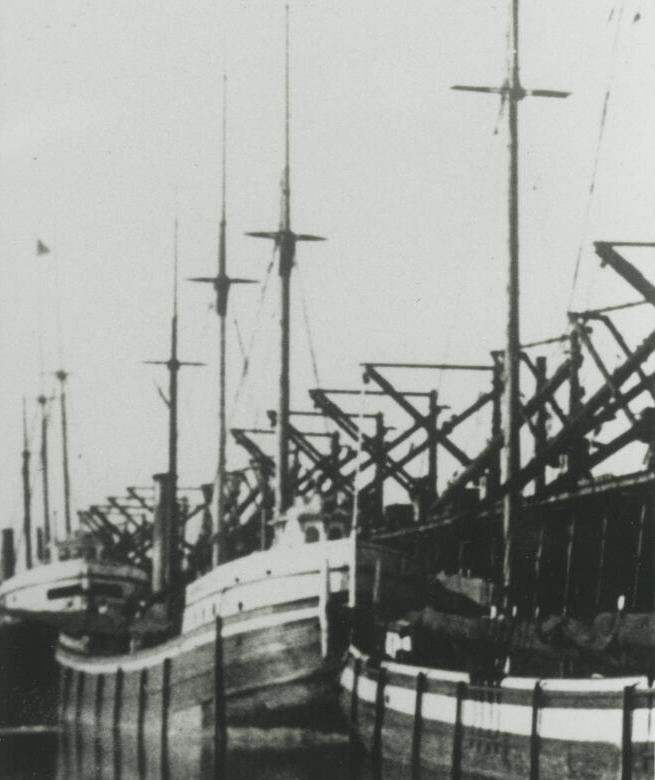
The steamer Henry Chisholm at the Northwest Coal Dock in Duluth, Minnesota

The Henry Chisholm (Official number 95610) was built in 1880 at Thomas Quayle & Sons shipyards in Cleveland, Ohio, which was considered the best wooden shipbuilders on the Great Lakes. She was a 265-foot wooden steam-powered freighter, 39 feet in breadth and 20 feet in depth, carrying three masts and a double expansion steam engine with twin Scotch boilers capable of producing 1707HP, powering a single screw. The hull was reinforced with steel and iron strapping, and was the largest wooden "steam barge" ever built in Cleveland, approaching the practical size limit for a wooden vessel of its type. The ship cost $125,999 to build, and was launched on August 28, 1880.

The ship was built for Alva Bradley of Cleveland, and named for Henry Chisholm, father of the steel industry in that city. It was used on the Great Lakes from the time it was built until 1898, and frequently set records for cargo capacity, often towing several barges at once.

== Final voyage ==
The Henry Chisholm left Duluth, Minnesota on October 16, 1898 bound for Buffalo, New York, carrying 92,000 bushels of barley and towing the 220-foot schooner John Martin. The next day a heavy storm blew in and the tow rope to the John Martin was cast off. After the gale lessened, the Henry Chisholm spent the next few days searching for the John Martin. On October 20, 1898 the ship struck a reef near the Rock of Ages Light while attempting to enter Washington Harbor. Determining the hull was too badly damaged to refloat, the captain abandoned ship, sending several crewmembers to Victoria Harbor for assistance while taking the remainder of the crew into Washington Harbor. The John Martin was later found, essentially unharmed and sailing under her own power.

Salvage began almost immediately, but the ship broke up and sank during storms a week later. The Scotch boilers were salvaged in 1901, but by that time the engine had slid downhill away from the wreck. The Henry Chisholm sat mostly undisturbed until she was rediscovered by sport divers in the 1960s.

== Wrecksite ==
The Henry Chisholm sits in waters of 80 to 150 feet (24 to 46 m), lying on its side. Portions of the wooden hull are intermingled with the wreckage of Cumberland, which had sunk earlier in 1877. The stern of the ship is broken away from the rest of the wreckage, and sits some distance away.

The steam engine, drive shaft and prop are intact in the stern section, sitting upright at the 120–150 foot depth. The steam engine is of the double expansion variety, 20 feet (6.1 m) high, and is in nearly perfect condition, easily viewable and accessible through the sheared-off stern. Approximately 75 dives were made to the Henry Chisholm in 2009 out of 1,062 dives made to wrecks in the Isle Royale National Park.
