= Rock of Ages Light =

Lighthouse in Michigan, United States

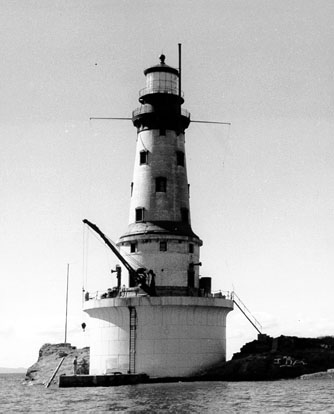
- Undated United States Coast Guard photo
- Location: Isle Royale, Michigan
- Coordinates: 47°52′00″N 89°18′48″W

Tower
- Constructed: 1908
- Foundation: Concrete Pier; Steel Caisson
- Construction: Steel, Masonry, Concrete
- Automated: 1978
- Height: 117 feet (36 m)
- Shape: Cylindrical base/Frustum of a Cone tower
- Markings: White; Black base and lantern
- Heritage: National Register of Historic Places listed place

Light
- First lit: 1910
- Focal height: 130 feet (40 m)
- Lens: 2nd Order bivalve Fresnel Lens (original), 12-inch (300 mm) Tideland Signal ML-300 Acrylic Optic (current)
- Range: 15 nautical miles; 27 kilometres (17 mi)
- Characteristic: two flashes every 10 s
- Rock of Ages Light Station
- U.S. National Register of Historic Places
- Nearest city: Grand Portage, Minnesota
- Area: 0.1 acres (0.040 ha)
- Architect: Keller; Beger, Walter F.
- MPS: U.S. Coast Guard Lighthouses and Light Stations on the Great Lakes TR
- NRHP reference No.: 83000881
- Added to NRHP: August 04, 1983

The Rock of Ages Light is a U.S. Coast Guard lighthouse on a small rock outcropping (50 by 200 feet (15 m × 61 m)) approximately 2.25 miles (3.62 km) west of Washington Island and 3.5 miles (5.6 km) west of Isle Royale, in Eagle Harbor Township, Keweenaw County, Michigan (see map below). It is an active aid to navigation.

== History ==
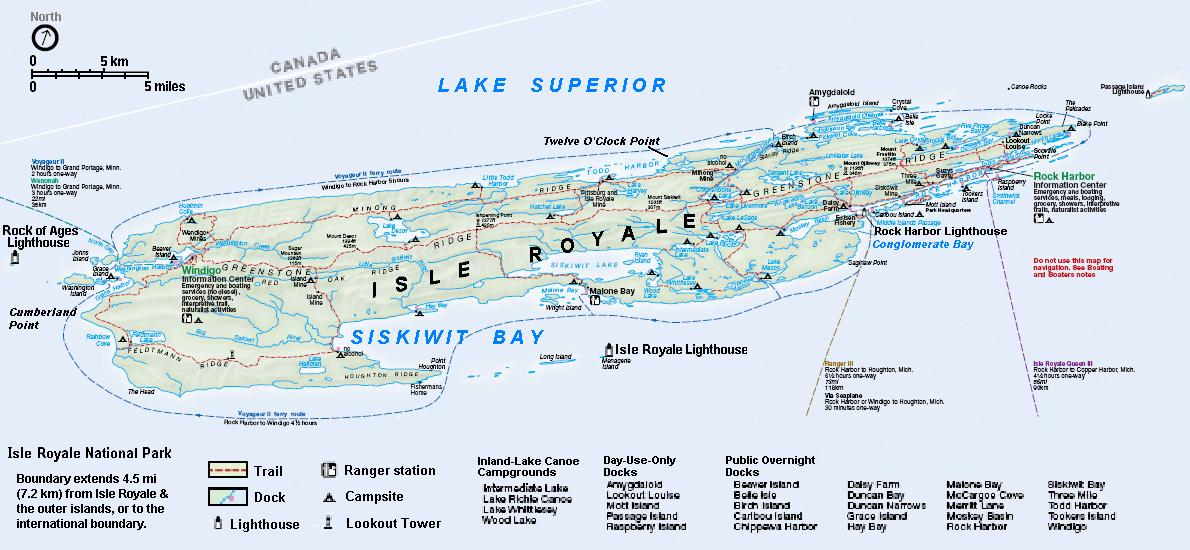
Rock of Ages Lighthouse (far left) is located on the reef off the west coast of Isle Royale

=== Overview ===
The period between 1852 and the beginning of the 20th century saw great activity on the Great Lakes by the United States Lighthouse Board. Between 1852 and 1860 26 new lights were built. Even as the United States Civil War and its aftermath slowed construction, a dozen new lights were still lit in that decade. In the 1870s, 43 new lights were built on the Lakes. The 1880s saw more than one hundred lights constructed.

As the new century began, on the Great Lakes the Lighthouse Board operated 334 major lights, 67 fog horns and 563 buoys.

During the 19th century design of Great Lakes lights slowly evolved. Until 1870 the most common design was to build a keeper's dwelling with the light on the dwelling's roof or on a relatively small square tower attached to the house. In the 1870s, so as to raise lights to a higher focal plane, conical brick towers, usually between eighty and one hundred feet tall, were constructed. In the 1890s steel lined towers began to replace the older generation of brick building. See Big Sable Point Light for a striking transition and transformation.

The Rock of Ages Light was part of a forty year effort—between 1870 and 1910—where engineers began to build lights on isolated islands, reefs, and shoals that were significant navigational hazards. To that time, Light ships were the only practical way to mark the hazards, but were dangerous for the sailors who manned them, and difficult to maintain. "Worse, regardless of the type of anchors used lightships could be blown off their expected location in severe storms, making them a potential liability in the worst weather when captains would depend on the charted location of these lights to measure their own ship's distance from dangerous rocks." See, United States lightship Huron (LV-103).

Successively, using underwater crib designs, the Board built on a shoal the Waugoshance Light (1851), and demonstrated a "new level of expertise" in constructing of the Spectacle Reef Light (1874), Stannard Rock Light (1882) and Detroit River (Bar Point Shoal) (also known as the Detroit River Entrance Light) (1885). "The long and expensive process of building lights" in remote and difficult sites "ended in nationally publicized engineering projects that constructed" Rock of Ages (1908) and the White Shoal (1910) lights.

In the first three decades of the twentieth century the Lighthouse Board and the new Lighthouse Service continued to build new lights on the Great Lakes. For 1925, the Board had under its auspices around the Great Lakes: 433 major lights; ten lightships; 129 fog signals; and about 1,000 buoys. Of these 1,771 navigational aids, 160 stations had resident keepers, as most navigational aids were automated. By 1925 nearly all of the Great Lakes lighthouses that today exist—excepting e.g., Milwaukee Breakwater Light (1926), Poe Reef Light and Gravelly Shoal Light and some memorial lights, namely Manning Memorial Light, Another is the William Livingtone Memorial Light and the latest Great Lakes light, namely Tri-Centennial Light of Detroit—had been constructed.

=== Wrecks of the Cumberland and the Chisholm ===
The Rock of Ages reef consists of outcroppings of rocks, west of Isle Royale, that are an imminent hazard to navigation. Several wrecks occurred on the reef prior to the construction of the lighthouse.

The Cumberland was a 200 feet (61 m) side-wheeled steamer that was built in Canada in 1872 for $100,000. She operated between Georgian Bay and Duluth, Minnesota. In July 1877, she sailed from Port Arthur, Ontario for Duluth. In clear weather, she ran into the reef under steam. Effort to pull the ship from the rocks failed. On August 6, 1877, the ship was abandoned. Later that month, she broke in two and sank in nearby waters.

On October 18, 1898, the Henry Chisholm, which was built in Cleveland, Ohio in 1880, ran on the rocks while steaming at 9 knots (17 km/h). Salvage vessels could not save the ship. She broke up in a storm at the end of October. She sank on top of the wreck of Cumberland.

=== Rock of Ages Light ===
In 1908, construction began on the lighthouse. The construction crew established a base at Washington Harbor and used the lighthouse tender Amaranth to ferry men and materials to the site. A section of a rock was blasted to provide a flat area for the foundation. A steel cylindrical wall was erected and filled with concrete to give a pier that was 50 feet (15 m) in diameter and 25 feet (7.6 m) tall. The skeleton of the tower was built from steel. The inner and outer walls of the tower were constructed of brick. The concrete floors were supported on radial steel beams. The spiral stairs were cast iron. When the tower was enclosed, a bunkhouse, mess hall, and galley were built on a timber platform on the rock. The lighthouse was lit in 1908 with a temporary light.

In 1910, a second-order Fresnel made by Barbier, Benard & Turenne was purchased and installed. The lens floated in a mercury bath to provide very low turning friction. These massive lenses are 81.46 inches (2,069 mm) high, with a focal length of 27.6 inches (700 mm). It weighed 3,530 pounds (1,600 kg). Relative to a sixth-order Fresnel, it was 11.54 times brighter, and would have a useful range of up to 20 nautical miles (37 km; 23 mi). Hourly oil consumption was 17 1/5 ounces. Similar lights were installed at Grosse Point Light and White Shoal Light.

A crew of lighthouse keepers was landed on the station each spring at the beginning of the shipping season, stayed the entire shipping season, and left in the fall. The remoteness and inaccessibility of the light made provisioning it especially burdensome and risky. At the end of one season, the crew's food was down to a single can of tomatoes when they were evacuated. Consequently, the lighthouse service took special precautions to make sure those dire straits would not recur.

The structure of this light is unusual. The caisson which forms the first level is 25 feet high and contains a two-story cellar. From the bedrock up, a central steel core runs through the center of the structure and is its main support. Although "unique, . . . it bears some resemblance to the 1893 Chicago Harbor Light."

Part of the reason for the closing of the Rock Harbor Light station was the 1875 establishment of the Isle Royale Light on Menagerie Island. Shortly thereafter, a third light station was erected in the Isle Royale area -- Passage Island Light lit on July 1, 1882.

The light was automated in 1978, which ended 68 years of service by light keepers. In 1985, the Fresnel lens was replaced when the light was powered by solar energy.

The original Fresnel Lens is on exhibit at the Windigo Information Station harbor, and at Isle Royale National Park ranger station located close to the western end of Isle Royale., and seeing the lens is said to be 'worth the trip.'

The design is "similar to that of the offshore sparkplug towers," but taller. It is in form a close cousin to the Chicago Harbor Light, which is its contemporary.

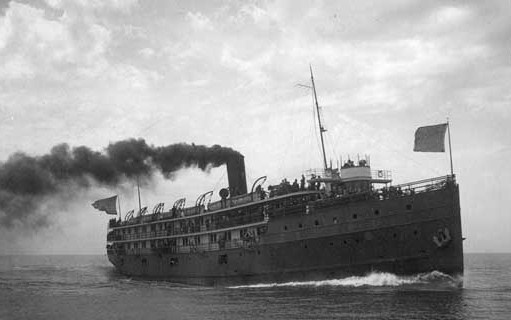
George M. Cox in happier days as the Puritan

=== Wreck of the George M. Cox ===
The George M. Cox was a 270-foot (82 m) steamer that was built in 1901 and christened the SS Puritan. This ship served briefly in the U.S. Navy to transport troops back home at the conclusion of World War I. In 1933, she was purchased by George Cox and renamed the George M. Cox. On a cruise of Lake Superior with a contingent of special guests, First Mate Art Kronk plotted a course expected to take the Cox well clear of the rocks and reefs. Captain George Johnson and First Mate Kronk could hear the foghorn of the Rock of Ages Light. They proceeded at full lake speed (16.5 knots (30.6 km/h; 19.0 mph)) even though navigational rules called for "moderate speed" in conditions of limited visibility. The Cox struck the reef in heavy fog near the Rock of Ages Light on May 27, 1933. The Cox sat amidships on the shoal with her bow jutting into the air while her stern flooded with water. Crewmen were able to safely evacuate the ship using 5 lifeboats and several life rafts. The Rock of Ages lighthouse keeper, John Soldenski, raced to scene with a gasoline powered boat and towed the life rafts back to the lighthouse while the lifeboats followed along behind. The 127 passengers and crew spent the night in the crowded lighthouse and the surrounding rocks. Being unsalvageable, the ship remained on the rocks until it was broken up in an October storm. It sank near the wrecks of the Cumberland and the Chisholm.

== National Register of Historic Places ==
The Rock of Ages Light Station was named to the National Register of Historic Places on August 4, 1983, No. 83000881. It was also documented by the Historic American Buildings Survey, because it was a "major engineering feat in an isolated location.

The wrecks of the Cumberland, the Chisholm, and the George M. Cox were independently named to the National Register of Historic Places.

== Viewing the light ==
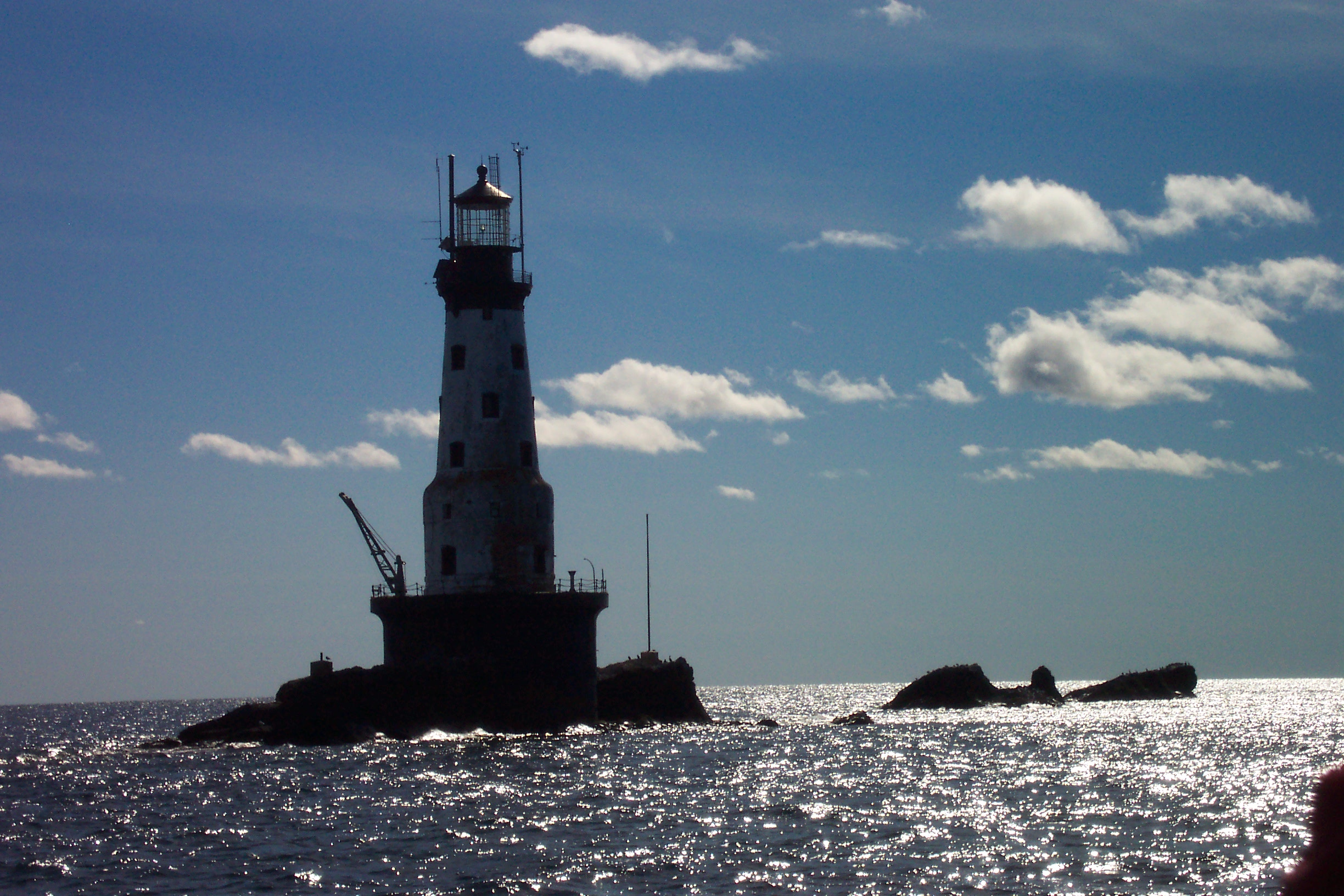
Viewed from the Wenonah, September, 2006

The tower has an array of weather instruments, which is a NOAA C-MAN station. Real time weather station readouts are available here .

The tower is closed. It may only be accessed by boat. However, it may be viewed from ferries to Isle Royale from Grand Portage, Minnesota, or from Keweenaw Excursions boat tours. Grand Portage Isle Royale Transportation Line has two boats that offer service to Isle Royale National Park. The Sea Hunter III travels daily between Grand Portage, Minnesota to Windigo, on the western end of Isle Royale. The Voyageur II makes overnight trips. The Lighthouse is visible from either boat, which operate during the summer season.

== Restoration ==
The Rock of Ages Lighthouse Preservation Society began restoring the lighthouse in 2014. Working as a partner of the National Park Service, the Society plans to open the light to the public upon completion of the project.
