= Cleveland Rolling Mill =

Rolling steel mill in Cleveland, Ohio, US

Coordinates: 41°27′19″N 81°37′36″W

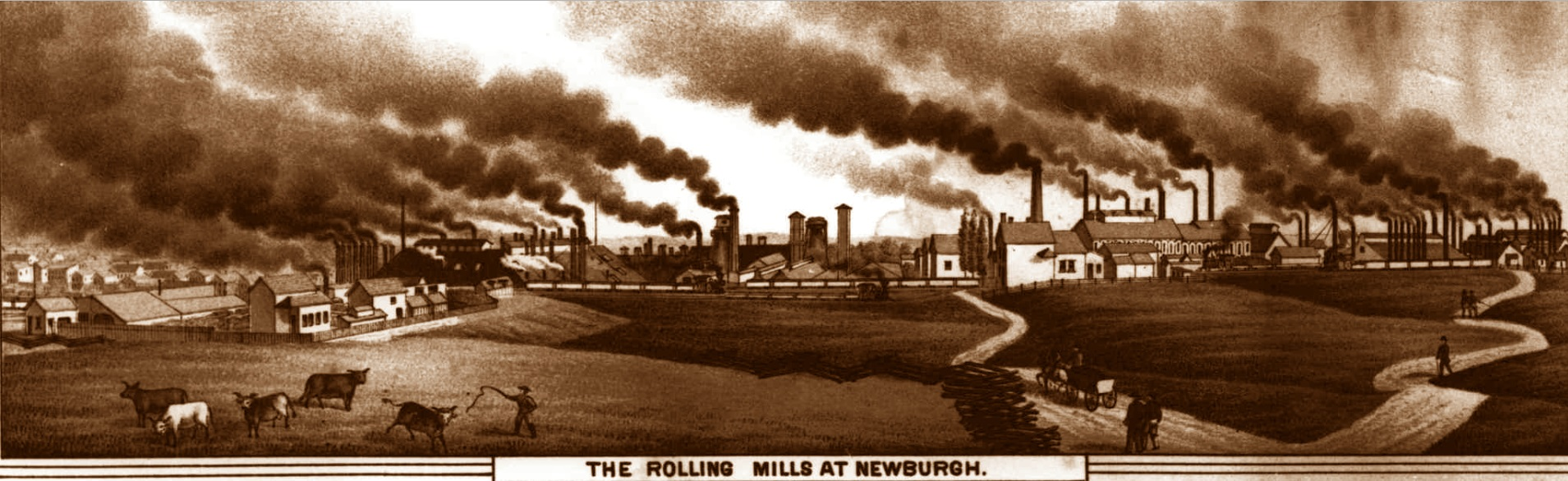
1885 drawing of the Newburgh Works of the Cleveland Rolling Mill

The Cleveland Rolling Mill Company was a rolling steel mill in Cleveland, Ohio. It existed as an independent entity from 1863 to 1899.

== Origins ==
The company stemmed from developments initiated in 1857, when John and David I. Jones, along with Henry Chisholm, established a rolling mill at Newburgh, incorporated as Chisholm, Jones & Company, to reroll worn rails. In 1858, Andros B. Stone (brother of Amasa Stone) bought into the firm, which became the Stone, Chisholm & Jones Company, and produced iron rails. The first blast furnace in Cleveland was built by the firm in 1861. In November 1863, an investment from Stone led to the expansion and reorganization of the company, which then became the Cleveland Rolling Mill Company.

In 1868 the company installed a pair of Bessemer converters, and started using them to produce steel. During the 1870s, various types of wire products were produced at the mill. In 1881 the company built Central Furnaces plant, near the Cuyahoga River, for the production of pig iron.

== Strikes ==
In May 1882 the mill was faced with a strike from its skilled workers, mostly of British origin, in response to disregard by the company to union demands. The company recruited Polish and Czech immigrants to replace striking workers, and reopened on 5 June. The company eventually gained the sympathy of the city when the striking workers turned violent on 13 June.

In June 1885 a larger and more violent strike occurred, this time led by Polish and Czech workers in response to wage cuts. The violent tactics used by the strikers made the union unable to sustain support by the English-speaking skilled workers, who eventually returned to work in September. To prevent further riots by the unskilled workers, Mayor George Gardner ordered the company's president (William Chisholm, the oldest son of Henry Chisholm) to revert the wage cuts, which ended the strike, although many of the striking workers were denied their jobs back.

== Growth and merger ==
The company reached its peak in the late 1890s, at which point it had become a major integrated producer of pig iron, Bessemer steel, and steel products, employing a workforce of over 8,000 people. In 1899 the Cleveland Rolling Mill Company was absorbed into the American Steel and Wire Company of New Jersey, which was in turn merged into J. P. Morgan's U.S. Steel conglomerate two years later.

== See also ==
- Cleveland railroad history
