= List of Great Lakes shipwrecks on the National Register of Historic Places =

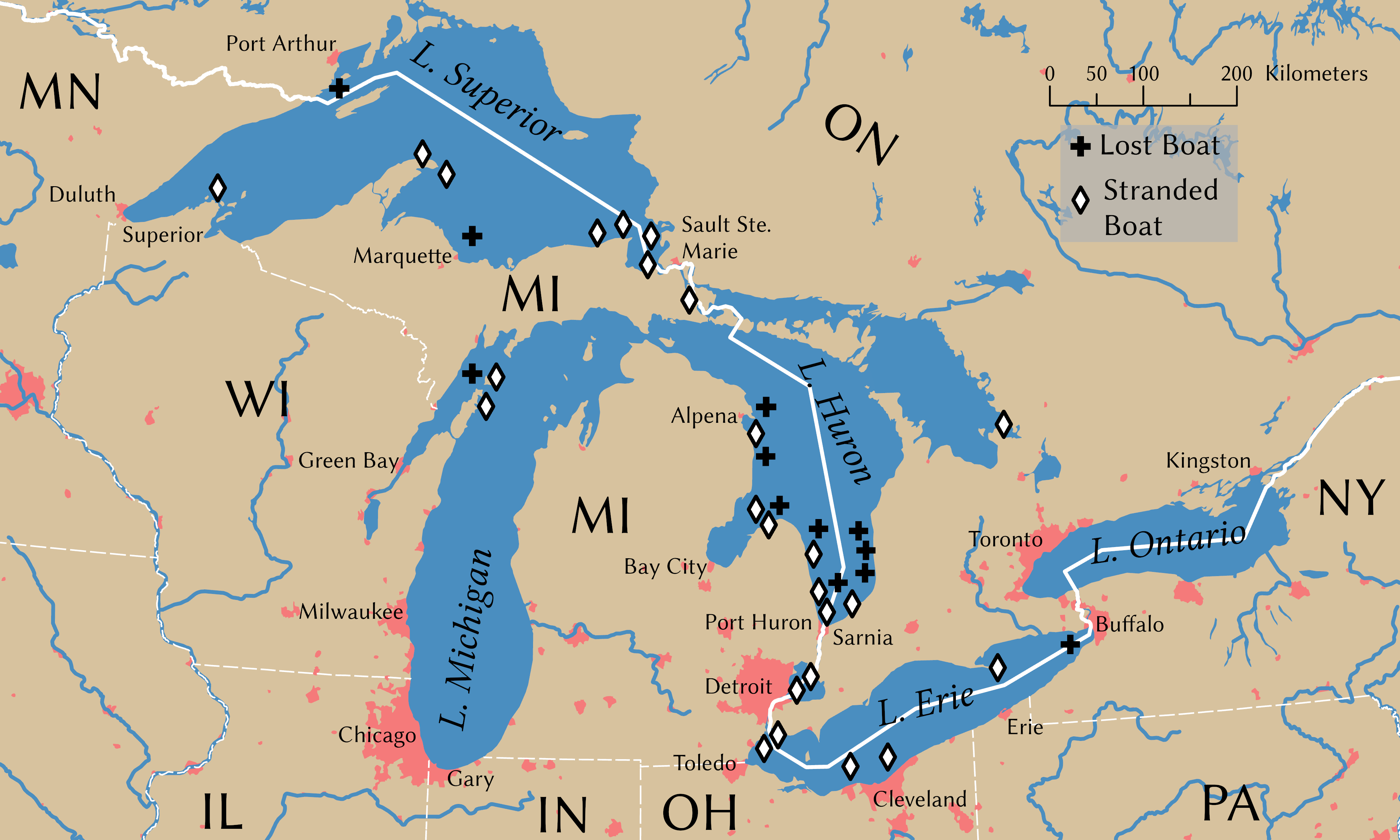
Map of the shipwrecks in the Great Storm of 1913

This is a list of shipwrecks on the Great Lakes of North America that are listed on the National Register of Historic Places. The locations of National Register properties for which the latitude and longitude coordinates are included below, may be seen in an online map. This list includes shipwrecks that are located in the waters of Lake Superior, Lake Huron, Lake Michigan, Lake Erie and Lake Ontario.

This National Park Service list is complete through NPS recent listings.

== Lake Superior ==
	Name on the Register	Image	Date listed	Location	City or town	Description
1	Algoma	Algoma	June 14, 1984 (#84001699)	Southeast shore of Mott Island; 48°06′41″N 88°31′55″W	Isle Royale National Park	The Algoma was a passenger steamer built in 1883. In November 1885, it ran into a blinding snowstorm, veered off course, and ran aground near Isle Royale. As the storm continued to rage, the ship came apart, eventually killing 46 people. The wreck of the Algoma was the worst loss of life in the history of Lake Superior shipping.
2	Amboy and George Spencer Shipwreck Sites	Amboy and George Spencer Shipwreck Sites	April 14, 1994 (#94000341)	Lake Superior shore about a mile southwest of Sugar Loaf Cove; 47°28′41″N 90°59′59″W	Schroeder vicinity	Remains of an 1884 wooden bulk freighter and its 1874 schooner-barge consort, associated with the nationally significant Great Lakes iron ore trade and the infamous 1905 Mataafa Storm that sank them.
3	America	America	June 14, 1984 (#84001708)	North Gap of Washington Harbor; 47°53′39″N 89°13′15″W	Isle Royale National Park	The America served as a communications link for the communities of western Lake Superior in the early 20th century. Beginning in 1902, she ran three voyages per week among Duluth, Minnesota, Isle Royale, and Thunder Bay, Ontario, as well as numerous small communities in between. In June 1928, the America ran aground while leaving Washington Harbor, and efforts to salvage her were unsuccessful. The ship can be seen from the surface, with her bow in only two feet of water.
4	Antelope (schooner-barge) Shipwreck	Antelope (schooner-barge) Shipwreck	June 22, 2018 (#100002610)	7.5 miles (12.1 km) SE of Michigan Island in L. Superior; 46°49′08″N 90°27′14″W	La Pointe vicinity	187-foot wood-hulled steamship built in 1861 that initially hauled passengers. Later converted to a schooner. Sank in 1897 carrying 1,000 tons of coal while being towed from the Ashland ore docks toward Duluth.
5	Benjamin Noble (Shipwreck)	Benjamin Noble (Shipwreck)	September 20, 2007 (#07000984)	Mid-Lake off Knife River; 46°56′00″N 91°40′00″W	Knife River vicinity	The SS Benjamin Noble was a steel hulled package freighter package freighter built in 1909, that went down with all hands in 1914, in mid-lake off Knife River, Minnesota. Her wreck was found half buried in 2004, in 365-feet of water.
6	Big Bay Sloop shipwreck (sloop)	Big Bay Sloop shipwreck (sloop)	January 14, 2009 (#08001327)	Off the coast of Madeline Island, east of Big Bay State Park; 46°48′31″N 90°38′44″W	La Pointe	Remains of an unidentified small sloop, probably built around 1880, lying under 25 feet of water.
7	Chester A. Congdon	Chester A. Congdon	June 14, 1984 (#84001716)	Congdon Shoals on northeast end of Isle Royale; 48°11′36″N 88°30′52″W	Isle Royale National Park	Originally named the Salt Lake City, when constructed in 1907, the bulk steel freighter sank near Isle Royale in Lake Superior in 1918. It was the first wreck in Lake Superior to be valued at over one million dollars.
8	Cumberland	Cumberland	June 14, 1984 (#84001732)	Near Rock of Ages Light; 47°51′28″N 89°19′39″W	Isle Royale National Park	The Cumberland was a wooden-hulled side paddlewheeler built in 1871. In July 1877, she began taking on water after leaving Thunder Bay, and struck a reef near the Rock of Ages Light. The day was clear and dry, and passengers and crew were removed without difficulty. The wreckage of the Cumberland is intermingled with some portions of the hull of the Henry Chisholm, which sank later in 1898.
9	Emperor	Emperor	June 14, 1984 (#84001748)	North side of Canoe Rocks, on the northeast end of Isle Royale; 48°12′02″N 88°29′30″W	Isle Royale National Park	The Emperor was a freighter constructed in 1910, and at 525 feet in length, it was the largest Canadian-built freighter ever built at the time of her launching. In June 1947, the Emperor left Thunder Bay, laden with 10,429 tons of iron ore. Her course was miscalculated, and the ship ran aground at 4:15 in the morning on the north side of Canoe Rocks. The Emperor sank within 30 minutes, killing twelve crewmembers.
10	George M. Cox	George M. Cox	June 14, 1984 (#84001749)	Near Rock of Ages Light; 47°51′28″N 89°19′23″W	Isle Royale National Park	The Cox was launched in 1901 as the USS Puritan, a civilian transport ship. It was used by the US Navy in World War I, but returned to civilian service afterward. It sank in 1933 near the Rock of Ages Light off Isle Royale in Lake Superior.
11	Glenlyon	Glenlyon	June 14, 1984 (#84001750)	Glenlyon Shoals off Menagerie Island in Siskiwit Bay; 47°57′08″N 88°44′53″W	Isle Royale National Park	The Glenlyon was a freighter built in 1893. Over its career, it was owned by many companies, and hauled both package freight and bulk cargo, as well as, for a short time, passengers for both U.S. and Canada. The ship ran aground on November 1, 1924, while heading for shelter in Siskiwit Bay.
12	Harriet B. (shipwreck)	Harriet B. (shipwreck)	August 9, 2018 (#100002773)	Four miles off Two Harbors; 46°58′00″N 91°42′00″W	Two Harbors vicinity	Wooden barge that started life in 1895 as the wooden ferry Shenango No.2. Cut down to bulk freighter in 1918, and reduced to a barge in 1921. Sunk by the freighter Quincy A. Shaw in 1922. She lies in 656 feet of water, and is Minnesota's most intact shipwreck.
13	Henry Chisholm	Henry Chisholm	June 14, 1984 (#84001752)	Near Rock of Ages Light; 47°51′28″N 89°19′41″W	Isle Royale National Park	The Henry Chisholm was a wooden freighter built in 1880, and was the largest wooden "steam barge" ever built in Cleveland, approaching the practical size limit for a wooden vessel of its type. In October 1898, the Chisholm left Duluth, Minnesota, towing the 220-foot schooner John Martin. A storm blew up and the Martin was cast off. After the gale lessened, the Chisholm spent the next few days searching for the Martin, and struck a reef near the Rock of Ages Light while attempting to enter Washington Harbor. Portions of the Chisholm's hull are intermingled with the wreckage of the SS Cumberland, which had sunk earlier in 1877.
14	Hesper Shipwreck Site	Hesper Shipwreck Site	April 14, 1994 (#94000343)	Along the west breakwall in Silver Bay Harbor. 47°16′17″N 91°16′18″W	Silver Bay vicinity	Well-preserved wreck of a bulk freight steamship, associated with the Great Lakes iron-ore and grain trades. Launched in 1890 and sunk in a 1905 spring storm.
15	Kamloops	Kamloops	June 14, 1984 (#84001769)	Kamloops Point; 48°05′06″N 88°45′53″W	Isle Royale National Park	The SS Kamloops was a lake freighter that was part of the fleet of Canada Steamship Lines from its launching in 1924 until it sank with all hands off Isle Royale in Lake Superior on or about 7 December 1927.
16	Lucerne (Shipwreck)	Lucerne (Shipwreck)	December 18, 1991 (#91001775)	Off northeast shore of Long Island; 46°43′23″N 90°46′02″W	La Pointe	195 foot three-masted schooner built in 1873. On her last voyage in November 1886, dropped coal in Washburn, loaded 1256 tons of Gogebic iron ore at Ashland, and left for Cleveland. She sank in a snowstorm, with all crew lost.
17	Madeira (Schooner-Barge) Shipwreck	Madeira (Schooner-Barge) Shipwreck	July 23, 1992 (#92000843)	Near the base of Gold Rock; 47°12′22″N 91°21′29″W	Beaver Bay vicinity	Only known remains of a schooner-barge, a little-known ship type with sails to aid its tow vessel. Launched in 1900 and wrecked during the infamous Mataafa Storm of 1905, prompting construction of the Split Rock Lighthouse nearby.
18	Marquette (shipwreck)	Marquette (shipwreck)	February 13, 2008 (#08000027)	5 miles (8.0 km) east of Michigan Island, Lake Superior; 46°50′02″N 90°25′47″W	La Pointe	235 foot wooden bulk freighter built in 1881 in Cleveland. On Oct 15, 1903, heading east with iron ore in fair weather, she sprang a leak and sank. The crew escaped.
19	Mayflower (shipwreck)	Mayflower (shipwreck)	August 28, 2012 (#12000560)	2.25 miles south of Lester River in Lake Superior; 46°48′12″N 92°00′40″W	Lester Park vicinity	Wreck of an 1887 scow schooner lost in 1891, an important example of a fairly common but little documented type of Great Lakes merchant vessel.
20	Monarch	Monarch	June 14, 1984 (#84001779)	Palisade area on the north side of Blake Point; 48°11′20″N 88°26′03″W	Isle Royale National Park	The Monarch was a passenger-package freighter built in 1890. In December 1906, the departed Thunder Bay for Sarnia in a blinding snowstorm. For some reason, the ship headed off its planned course, and that night it rammed at full speed into the palisade area on the north side of Blake Point on Isle Roayale. Miraculously, all but one of the crew and passengers were able to make it to shore.
21	Moonlight shipwreck	Moonlight shipwreck	October 1, 2008 (#08000979)	7 miles (11 km) east of Michigan Island; 46°49′56″N 90°22′42″W	La Pointe vicinity	Graceful sailing schooner built in 1874 by Wolf & Davidson in Milwaukee. Her topmasts were removed in 1889 when she was converted to a barge. Sank in a storm in September 1903 while being towed with a load of iron ore out of Ashland.
22	Niagara Shipwreck Site	Niagara Shipwreck Site	April 14, 1994 (#94000344)	500 feet (150 m) south of Knife Island; 46°56′45″N 91°46′16″W	Knife River vicinity	Rare, early remnants of a class of large tugboats built for timber rafting on the Great Lakes. Launched in 1872 and sank in 1904 after running aground.
23	Noquebay (Schooner-Barge) Shipwreck Site	Noquebay (Schooner-Barge) Shipwreck Site	June 4, 1992 (#92000593)	Off Stockton Island, in Julian Bay; 46°55′45″N 90°32′39″W	La Pointe	205 foot schooner-barge built in 1872 in Trenton, Michigan. On October 6, 1905 it was loaded with 600,000 board feet of hemlock lumber and being towed toward Bay City, Michigan when she caught fire and eventually sank.
24	Onoko (Bulk Freight Steamer) Shipwreck	Onoko (Bulk Freight Steamer) Shipwreck	July 23, 1992 (#92000845)	6 miles south Knife River; 46°50′46″N 91°46′38″W	Knife River vicinity	1882 iron-hulled steamship, prototype of the large Great Lakes bulk freighters that became critical to the steel industry. Sprang a leak and sank in 1915.
25	Ottawa (Tug) Shipwreck Site	Ottawa (Tug) Shipwreck Site	June 8, 1992 (#92000594)	Northern edge of Red Cliff Bay; 46°53′08″N 90°45′39″W	Russell	151 foot tugboat built in Chicago in 1881 that first towed rafts of logs across Lake Michigan. In November 1909, after helping free a grounded steamship, she mysteriously caught fire in the night, burned and sank.
26	Pretoria (schooner-barge) Shipwreck Site	Pretoria (schooner-barge) Shipwreck Site	August 17, 1994 (#94000835)	One mile northeast of Outer Island. 47°05′22″N 90°23′40″W	Bayfield	Huge 338 foot schooner-barge built in 1900 in West Bay City, Michigan. On Sept. 1, 1905 she left Superior with a load of iron ore, towed by a steamer heading for Chicago. They were caught by the same storm that sank the Sevona, and the Pretoria sank with 5 crew lost.
27	R.G. Stewart (shipwreck)	R.G. Stewart (shipwreck)	December 27, 1991 (#91001850)	Off the southeast shore of Michigan Island; 46°52′24″N 90°28′30″W	La Pointe	100 foot wooden passenger steamer built in 1878 in Buffalo. On June 4, 1899 she ran off course in a fog and ran aground on Michigan Island, then caught fire. One crewman died.
28	Robert Wallace (bulk carrier) shipwreck site	Robert Wallace (bulk carrier) shipwreck site	October 14, 2009 (#09000828)	7 miles south of Knife River. Part of the Minnesota's Lake Superior Shipwrecks MPS. 46°50′50″N 91°43′44″W	Palmers	Largely untouched wreck of an 1882 iron-reinforced wooden steam barge sunk in 1902, with significant research potential on the formative design and shipboard life of the first lake freighters.
29	Samuel P. Ely Shipwreck	Samuel P. Ely Shipwreck	June 18, 1992 (#92000694)	Along Two Harbors' west breakwall 47°00′42″N 91°40′40″W	Two Harbors vicinity	Lake Superior's best remnant of the large ore schooners introduced around 1870, and a key part of local nautical lore for wrecking against the Two Harbors breakwater followed by the dramatic rescue of all hands in an 1896 storm.
30	Sevona (Bulk Carrier) Shipwreck Site	Sevona (Bulk Carrier) Shipwreck Site	April 9, 1993 (#93000229)	North of Sand Island; 47°00′24″N 90°54′32″W	Bayfield	372 foot steel steamer, built 1890 in Bay City, Michigan. Caught by a nor-easter on Sept 2, 1905, running from West Superior for Erie with 6000 tons of iron ore. Tried to shelter in Apostle Islands but ran aground on shoals north of Sand Island. Seven died - 16 escaped in lifeboats.
31	T.H. Camp (shipwreck)	T.H. Camp (shipwreck)	September 15, 2004 (#04001001)	Between Madeline Island and Basswood Island; 46°49′00″N 90°45′00″W	La Pointe	Steam-powered tugboat built in 1876. Served as a "purchase boat," collecting catch from remote fish camps as far away as Isle Royale or Canada. Sank in 1900.
32	Thomas Friant shipwreck (gill net tug)	Thomas Friant shipwreck (gill net tug)	November 18, 2019 (#100004627)	13 miles (21 km) southeast of Two Harbors, Minnesota; 46°52′00″N 91°29′00″W	Port Wing vicinity	Built in 1884 by Duncan Robertson in Grand Haven, the 96-foot wooden steam screw initially operated as a ferry on the Grand River before moving out to Lake Michigan. In 1908 she burned to the waterline in Sault Ste. Marie. Rebuilt as a fish tug in 1911. Sank off Two Harbors in January 1924, damaged by ice. She currently lies in 305-feet of water.
33	Thomas Wilson (Whaleback Freighter) Shipwreck	Thomas Wilson (Whaleback Freighter) Shipwreck	July 23, 1992 (#92000844)	7/8 of a mile outside the Duluth Harbor entrance. 46°47′00″N 92°04′10″W	Duluth vicinity	1892 freight steamer sunk in a collision just outside Duluth Harbor in 1902, prompting operational reforms. Wreck is one of the best surviving examples of whaleback design.
34	USS Essex Shipwreck Site	USS Essex Shipwreck Site	April 14, 1994 (#94000342)	Lake Superior; 46°42′46″N 92°01′43″W	Duluth	Remains of a U.S Navy steam sloop active 1876–1903, scrapped and burned to the waterline in 1931. Only surviving remnants of a vessel by influential shipbuilder Donald McKay.

== Lake Huron ==
	Name on the Register	Image	Date listed	Location	City or town	Description
1	Choctaw (shipwreck)	Choctaw (shipwreck)	December 10, 2018 (#100003214)	Lake Huron, approximately five miles east of Presque Isle Light; 45°32′02″N 83°30′33″W	Presque Isle	The Choctaw was a semi-whaleback ship (one of three built) that sank on Lake Huron in 1915 following a collision with the Canadian package freighter Wahcondah. After several unsuccessful searches, she was discovered in 2017, along with the wooden steamer Ohio. She currently lies in almost 300 feet of water.
2	F.T. Barney Shipwreck	F.T. Barney Shipwreck	August 19, 1991 (#91001016)	Lake Huron; 45°29′09″N 83°50′33″W	Rogers City	The F.T. Barney was a schooner built in 1856. It sank in 1868 in a collision with another schooner; the wreck lay undiscovered until 1987. It is in 160 feet of water, and is one of the most complete of a schooner of its era.
3	Grecian Shipwreck Site	Grecian Shipwreck Site	February 8, 2018 (#100001835)	L. Huron; 44°58′07″N 83°12′03″W	Alpena	The Grecian was built in 1891 by the Globe Iron Works Company in Cleveland, Ohio. She was one of the first propeller-driven steel lakers that hauled iron and coal on the Great Lakes. She sank in 1906 after striking a rock.
4	Joseph S. Fay Shipwreck Site	Joseph S. Fay Shipwreck Site	February 8, 2018 (#100001838)	Off of Forty Mile Point Lighthouse in L. Huron; 45°29′19″N 83°54′36″W	Rogers City vicinity	Wooden lake freighter built in 1871 ran aground in 1905 near the 40 Mile Point Light Station. Some of her lower hull remains in the water, while 150-feet of her starboard side is on the beach.
5	Kyle Spangler (schooner) Shipwreck Site	Kyle Spangler (schooner) Shipwreck Site	August 22, 2016 (#14001098)	Lake Huron, 4 miles (6.4 km) northeast of Presque Isle; 45°23′01″N 83°26′07″W	Presque Isle Township	The Kyle Spangler was a wooden schooner built in 1856. She sank in 1860 after a collision with another schooner; the wreck is remarkably undamaged.
6	Norman (shipwreck)	Norman (shipwreck)	November 22, 2016 (#16000819)	Lake Huron, 10.35 miles (16.66 km) east-southeast of Presque Isle Museum; 45°18′42″N 83°16′44″W	Presque Isle Township	The Norman was built in 1890 by the Globe Iron Works Company in Cleveland, Ohio. She was one of the first propeller-driven steel lakers that hauled iron and coal on the Great Lakes. On May 30, 1895, the Norman and the steamer Jack collided in the fog. She currently lies in 210 feet of water. Her wreck sits near the wreck of the wooden freighter Florida.
7	Pewabic (propeller) Shipwreck Site	Pewabic (propeller) Shipwreck Site	August 22, 2016 (#14001096)	Lake Huron; 44°57′53″N 83°06′14″W	Alpena Township	The SS Pewabic was a package freighter that served ports on the Upper Great Lakes. She was launched in October 1863, fitted out in the spring of 1864, and was in active service until she sank off Thunder Bay Island in Lake Huron on August 9, 1865, due to collision with her sister vessel.
8	Sport (tug) Shipwreck Site	Sport (tug) Shipwreck Site	October 29, 1992 (#92001503)	Three miles off the coast of Lexington; 43°16′00″N 82°27′54″W	Lexington	The first steel tug on the Great Lakes, and the first vessel made of Bessemer steel in North America. Built in 1873 and sank in 1920.

== Lake Michigan ==
	Name on the Register	Image	Date listed	Location	City or town	Description
1	Abiah (schooner) Shipwreck	Abiah (schooner) Shipwreck	June 16, 2022 (#100007799)	13.1 miles (21.1 km) northeast of the Sheboygan Lighthouse in Lake Michigan; 43°48′07″N 87°26′17″W	Haven vicinity	134-foot wooden schooner (or maybe a brig?) built in 1847 at Charles Stevens' shipyard in Irving, New York. Hauled grain, lumber, and railroad hardware on the Great Lakes until September 1855, when it capsized in a squall while sailing from Chicago to Oconto.
2	Advance shipwreck (Barge)	Advance shipwreck (Barge)	June 10, 2019 (#100004024)	0.1 miles (0.16 km) E of Sand Bay Peninsula, Sand Bay, in Lake Michigan; 44°51′48″N 87°29′49″W	Nasewaupee vicinity	139-foot 2-masted wooden schooner-barge built in 1871 by Alvin A. Turner in Trenton, Michigan. Hauled lumber from Peshtigo to Chicago, then in 1898 started hauling stone. In 1921, while off-loading 7,000 tons of coal from a stranded steamer, she was caught by the wind and sank.
3	Alaska Shipwreck (Scow Schooner)	Alaska Shipwreck (Scow Schooner)	January 17, 2017 (#100000518)	4.2 miles (6.8 km) NE of Two Rivers, in Lake Michigan; 44°10′08″N 87°28′12″W	Two Rivers	90-foot wooden scow-schooner built by Smith Neville, Sr. in Sheboygan in 1869. Mainly hauled lumber on Lake Michigan. Pushed ashore by a gale March 23, 1879, while carrying wheat to Ahnapee her remains now lie in 5 feet of water.
4	America Shipwreck (Canaller)	America Shipwreck (Canaller)	July 3, 2013 (#13000467)	Four miles offshore in Lake Michigan; 44°21′01″N 87°24′56″W	Carlton	137-foot three-masted canaller (schooner built specifically to squeeze through the Welland Canal), built in 1873. She hauled grain and lumber east as far as New York state, and brought back coal. Sank in 1880 after hitting a scow full of stones.
5	Appomattox (shipwreck)	Appomattox (shipwreck)	January 20, 2005 (#04001547)	Off Atwater Beach; Boundary increase (listed September 15, 2011): 150 yards. off Atwater Beach; 43°05′37″N 87°51′58″W	Shorewood	330-foot wooden steam freighter, built in 1896 by James Davidson. One of the largest wooden ships ever built, she mostly carried iron ore east on the Great Lakes and returned with coal. Ran aground in a fog bank in November 1905. Part of the Great Lakes Shipwreck Sites of Wisconsin MPS; boundary enlarged November 16, 2015.
6	Arctic Shipwreck (tug)	Arctic Shipwreck (tug)	June 22, 2018 (#100002612)	1.5 miles (2.4 km) NE of the Manitowoc Breakwater Light, in Lake Michigan; 44°06′51″N 87°37′52″W	Manitowoc vicinity	76.5 foot harbor tug, built in 1881 by Rand and Burger of Manitowoc with a wooden hull and a steam-screw drive. Escorted Goodrich steamers and other vessels around Manitowoc, Milwaukee and Chicago harbors for 49 years. Then stripped and abandoned in 1930.
7	Atlanta (steam screw) Shipwreck	Atlanta (steam screw) Shipwreck	November 6, 2017 (#100001785)	1.02 mi. NNE. of Amsterdam Park boat launch in L. Michigan; 43°34′15″N 87°46′58″W	Cedar Grove vicinity	200-foot screw steamer built in 1891 by the Cleveland Dry Dock Company for Goodrich Transport. Served as a packet boat, transporting passengers and freight around Lake Michigan. Caught fire March 18, 1906 heading from Sheboygan to Milwaukee, and abandoned, with one man lost.
8	Australasia (wooden bulk carrier) Shipwreck	Australasia (wooden bulk carrier) Shipwreck	July 3, 2013 (#13000466)	820 feet southeast of Whitefish Dunes State Park in Lake Michigan; 44°55′20″N 87°11′13″W	Sevastopol	285-foot bulk carrier built in 1884 in Bay City, the largest wooden ship ever built at that time. She hauled salt, wheat, etc from Duluth to Buffalo to Cleveland. On Oct 10, 1896, heading for Milwaukee carrying 2,200 tons of coal, she caught fire off Baileys Harbor and the crew scuttled her in shallow water.
9	Bullhead Point Historical and Archeological District	Bullhead Point Historical and Archeological District	March 26, 2003 (#03000167)	N. Duluth Ave. 44°50′37″N 87°23′43″W	Sturgeon Bay	Remains of three ships visible in shallow water from shore. All hauled limestone for the Sturgeon Bay Stone Company at the ends of their lives and were burned in 1931. They are the 212-foot steamer Empire State built in 1862, the 134-foot centerboard schooner Oak Leaf, and the 168-foot schooner-barge Ida Corning.
10	Byron (schooner) Shipwreck	Byron (schooner) Shipwreck	May 20, 2009 (#09000368)	Off Oostburg in Lake Michigan; 43°36′17″N 87°41′17″W	Oostburg	36-foot wooden schooner - probably the Byron, which was built around 1849 for William Burmeister and hauled lumber and merchandise around Lake Michigan. It sank in 1867 carrying merchandise for two stores in Manitowoc, after colliding with a larger ship.
11	Christina Nilsson (shipwreck)	Christina Nilsson (shipwreck)	July 17, 2003 (#03000668)	Baileys Harbor; 45°03′23″N 87°05′52″W	Baileys Harbor	139-foot schooner built by Hanson & Scove in Manitowoc in 1871 and named for a Swedish diva. In October 1884, hauling 575 tons of pig iron to Chicago, she was driven by a gale onto a reef and wrecked.
12	Claflin Point Site	Claflin Point Site	January 18, 2000 (#99001660)	Off the coast of Claflin Point; 44°50′44″N 87°33′00″W	Gardner	Wreck of a 170-foot wooden vessel next to remains of a crib-and-stone pier in Little Sturgeon Bay, lost under murky circumstances around 1898. It is believed to be the remains of the Puritan, a once-fast steamship reduced after burning to a barge for hauling limestone. A.k.a. Claflin Point Site.
13	Continental shipwreck (bulk carrier)	Continental shipwreck (bulk carrier)	January 14, 2009 (#08001330)	One mile north of Rawley Point; 44°13′50″N 87°30′31″W	Two Rivers	This 244-foot wood-hulled steam screw bulk carrier was built 1882 in Cleveland. She hauled iron and coal until December of 1904, when in a snowstorm she ran onto a sandbar off Rawley Point, while trying to reach dry dock in Manitowoc for the winter.
14	Daniel Lyons (Shipwreck)	Daniel Lyons (Shipwreck)	October 3, 2007 (#07001048)	E of Stoney Cr. outlet, 4 mi (6.4 km). offshore 44°40′21″N 87°17′43″W	Lake Michigan	Three-masted schooner built in 1873. Sank in 1878 after being hit by another schooner, on a run from Chicago to New York.
15	EMBA Shipwreck (Self-Unloading Barge)	EMBA Shipwreck (Self-Unloading Barge)	July 3, 2013 (#13000468)	5 miles East of North Point in Lake Michigan; 43°03′54″N 87°44′59″W	Lake Michigan	181-foot schooner-barge built in 1890 by Frank Wheeler Company of West Bay City. Hauled bulk coal, grain and lumber around Lake Michigan as a tow-barge. Converted to a self-unloader in 1923 to haul coal, and renamed for Employes' Mutual Benefit Association. Scuttled in 1933, considered obsolete.
16	Fleetwing (shipwreck)	Fleetwing (shipwreck)	July 11, 2001 (#01000734)	Garrett Bay; 45°17′15″N 87°02′59″W	Liberty Grove	132-foot two-masted schooner built in 1867 in Manitowoc by Henry Burger. Carried grain, coal and lumber from Chicago to Buffalo. On Sept 26, 1888, heading from Menominee toward Chicago in a gale, she tried to pass through Death's Door, but ran off course and grounded.
17	Floretta (canaller) Shipwreck	Floretta (canaller) Shipwreck	October 20, 2014 (#14000877)	11 mi. SE. of Manitowoc; 43°57′14″N 87°32′12″W	Centerville	Built in 1867 and sized to carry a maximum load through the Welland Canal locks, the Floretta carried grain and ore up and down the Great Lakes. She sank in a storm in 1885 and lies wrecked under 180 feet of water.
18	Francis Hinton (steamer)	Francis Hinton (steamer)	December 16, 1996 (#96001457)	Off the coast of Manitowoc, Wisconsin; 44°06′40″N 87°37′53″W	Manitowoc	152-foot wooden steambarge built in Manitowoc by Danish immigrants Hanson and Scove in 1889. She was broken up in November 1909, hauling lumber from Manistique to Chicago.
19	Frank O'Connor (bulk carrier)	Frank O'Connor (bulk carrier)	July 1, 1994 (#94000656)	2 miles (3.2 km) off Cana Island; 45°06′52″N 87°00′44″W	North Bay	301-foot wooden bulk carrier built in 1892 by James Davidson's shipyard in Bay City. On Sept 29, 1919, heading from Buffalo to Milwaukee hauling 3000 tons of coal, she caught fire and sank off Cana Island.
20	Gallinipper Shipwreck (Schooner)	Gallinipper Shipwreck (Schooner)	December 28, 2010 (#10001091)	9.5 miles northeast of Hika Park in Lake Michigan; 43°54′47″N 87°29′04″W	Centerville	This early 95-foot wooden schooner was built in 1832 in Ohio for Michael Dousman. She traded goods from out East for furs from Wisconsin, carried passengers, and had various mishaps. Finally sank in a gale in 1851, and now sits largely intact under 210 feet of water.
21	Grace A. Channon (canaller) Shipwreck	Grace A. Channon (canaller) Shipwreck	December 4, 2017 (#100001874)	12.75 miles (20.52 km) NE of the Bender Park boat launch in L. Michigan; 42°55′46″N 87°36′07″W	Oak Creek	Largely intact 141-foot wooden 3-masted schooner designed to fit maximum cargo through the Welland Canal, built in 1873 by Ellenwood & Co. of East Saginaw, and named for the daughter of an owner. Mostly hauled grain east and coal west on the Great Lakes. In August 1877, she was struck by the propeller-driven steam barge Favorite and quickly sank.
22	Grape Shot (schooner) Shipwreck		August 19, 2016 (#16000564)	0.2 miles (0.32 km) NW of USCCG Station on Plum Island; 45°19′28″N 86°58′02″W	Washington	130-foot wooden centerboard schooner built in 1855 by B.B. Jones in Buffalo. Hauled lumber, wheat and coal on the upper Great Lakes until November 1867, when a gale drove her aground near Plum Island.
23	Green Bay shipwreck (sloop)		November 18, 2009 (#09000952)	In Green Bay, four miles off Sturgeon Bay; 44°54′53″N 87°27′21″W	Sevastopol	Remains of an unidentified commercial freighting sloop from circa 1840 to 1860 - the only wreck of this type in Wisconsin waters.
24	Hanover (schooner) Shipwreck		October 5, 2015 (#15000710)	1.75 mi. NW. of Fish Cr. 45°08′48″N 87°16′13″W	Gibraltar	The Hanover was a 109-foot 2-masted schooner constructed in New York in 1853. It hauled bulk cargo (primarily grain) up and down the Great Lakes until 1863, when a gale drove it aground off the Strawberry Islands, where it was stripped and abandoned.
25	Hennepin Self-unloading Steamship (Shipwreck)	Hennepin Self-unloading Steamship (Shipwreck)	February 1, 2008 (#07001489)	Lake Michigan; 42°27′39″N 86°31′47″W	South Haven	The Hennepin was a wooden bulk carrier that sank in 1927. Originally named George H. Dyer; she caught fire in 1901. The fire damaged most of her upped deck and machinery, and therefore she was rebuilt with a conveyor belt and she became a self unloading bulk carrier.
26	Hetty Taylor (shipwreck)	Hetty Taylor (shipwreck)	June 1, 2005 (#05000535)	Lake Michigan, 7 mi. SE of Sheboygan R. 43°41′00″N 87°39′17″W	Sheboygan	84-foot two-masted schooner built in 1874 by Allen, McClelland and Co. of Milwaukee. Hauled wood products and merchandise around Lake Michigan until August 1880, when she sank in a squall.
27	Home (schooner)	Home (schooner)	December 28, 2010 (#10001092)	10 miles southeast of Manitowoc; 43°56′50″N 87°33′17″W	Centerville	Small lakeshoring schooner built in Portland, Ohio in 1843. Initially hauled grain and merchandise on Lake Erie; later lumber on Lake Michigan. Sank in 1858 after a collision with another schooner.
28	I.A. Johnson Shipwreck (Scow Schooner)	I.A. Johnson Shipwreck (Scow Schooner)	June 10, 2019 (#100004028)	8 miles north of Sheboygan; 43°53′32″N 87°39′06″W	Mosel vicinity	83.80-foot 2-masted scow-schooner built in Dover Bay, Ohio, in 1867 by master carpenter J.A. Johnson. She was used to carry mixed goods until 1890 when she sankin a collision with another schooner.
29	Iris (Shipwreck)		July 19, 2006 (#06000638)	Adjacent of Rock Island Ferry Dock, Jackson Harbor; 45°24′03″N 86°51′12″W	Washington Island	74-foot scow schooner built in 1866 at Port Huron. Abandoned in 1913 after grounding in Jackson Harbor.
30	Island City (schooner) Shipwreck		November 10, 2011 (#11000810)	9 miles southeast of Port Washington in Lake Michigan; 43°14′18″N 87°50′43″W	Mequon vicinity	81-foot lakeshoring schooner built by Peter Perry on Harsens Island, Michigan in 1859. Sank in a storm in April 1894, on her way from Ludington to Milwaukee, with two men lost.
31	Jacksonport Wharf Archeological District	Jacksonport Wharf Archeological District	February 28, 2012 (#12000053)	Near Lakeside Park off Cty. Rd. V 44°58′43″N 87°11′00″W	Jacksonport	Remains of three old piers started in 1848 for loading shingles and poles into schooners headed for Milwaukee and Chicago. Remains of three schooners lie nearby: the Perry Hannah was wrecked by the Alpena Blow of 1880, the Cecelia wrecked by a storm in 1885, and possibly the Annie Dall, wrecked by a storm in 1898. Additional documentation and boundary increase July 27, 2015 (#15000478)
32	J.M. Allmendinger (Steambarge) Shipwreck	J.M. Allmendinger (Steambarge) Shipwreck	October 11, 2018 (#100003012)	2.5 mi. SSE of Concordia U. in Lake Michigan; 43°13′05″N 87°53′39″W	Mequon	104 foot wood-hulled steam-screw barge built in 1883 by Albert Burgoyne at Benton Harbor. Hauled mostly lumber until November of 1895, when she ran aground during a gale and broke up.
33	Joys (Shipwreck)	Joys (Shipwreck)	November 21, 2007 (#07001218)	500 ft. W of Sunset Park; 44°51′04″N 87°23′21″W	Sturgeon Bay	131-foot wooden steam barge built in 1884 by the Milwaukee Shipyard Company. Hauled lumber, iron and stone. Caught fire in the Sturgeon Bay ship canal in 1898, burned and sank.
34	Kate Kelly (Shipwreck)	Kate Kelly (Shipwreck)	November 21, 2007 (#07001219)	L. Michigan, 2 mi. E of Wind Pt. 42°46′48″N 87°43′31″W	Wind Point	126-foot wooden-hulled 2-masted schooner built in 1867. Carried grain, coal and iron around the Great Lakes. Sank in a storm in 1895 carrying a load of hemlock railroad ties to Chicago. She lies in 54-feet of water.
35	Lady Elgin Shipwreck	Lady Elgin Shipwreck	November 5, 1999 (#94000362)	Off Highwood, Illinois; 42°11′00″N 87°39′00″W	Chicago vicinity	252-foot wooden paddle steamer rammed and sunk by the schooner Augusta on September 8, 1860 off Highwood, Illinois. Around 300 lives were lost. Today, she lies in 60 feet (18 m) of water.
36	Lakeland (steam screw) Shipwreck	Lakeland (steam screw) Shipwreck	July 7, 2015 (#15000403)	6 mi. E. of Sturgeon Bay Canal; 44°47′34″N 87°11′32″W	Sturgeon Bay	In 1886, the Cambria was built as a bulk freighter and was an early user of steel hull plates and a triple-expansion steam engine. In 1910 it was remodeled into a passenger steamer, and in 1920 into a car carrier. In December 1924, hauling a load of automobiles from Chicago, some of her steel plates buckled in heavy seas, and she eventually went down in 205 feet of water.
37	LaSalle Shipwreck (schooner)		May 1, 2017 (#100000949)	1.27 mi. S. of Rawley Pt. Lighthouse in L. Michigan; 44°11′31″N 87°30′35″W	Two Rivers	139-foot three-masted schooner built in 1874 by Parsons & Humble of Tonawanda, built to hold maximum grain yet fit through the locks of the Welland Canal. On October 25, 1875, heading with a load of wheat from Chicago for Buffalo, she was damaged in a gale, caught in quicksand, and wrecked.
38	Light Vessel No.57 (Shipwreck)	Light Vessel No.57 (Shipwreck)	December 23, 1991 (#91001823)	600 feet south of South Shore Park's northern tip right along the shore 43°00′06″N 87°53′08″W	Milwaukee	Lightship built in 1891 and sank in 1924. The only remaining lightship in Wisconsin waters.
39	Lookout (schooner) Shipwreck	Lookout (schooner) Shipwreck	June 5, 2017 (#100001051)	Lake Michigan, 4.35 miles (7.00 km) northeast of Two Rivers; 44°11′42″N 87°30′36″W	Two Rivers	127-foot wooden schooner built in 1855 by George Hardison of Buffalo, NY. Sailed the Great Lakes for many years, with cargoes including grain, coal and lumber. Grounded off Rawley Point April 29, 1897, heading from Chicago to Masonville, Michigan in a northeast gale.
40	Louisiana (Shipwreck)	Louisiana (Shipwreck)	March 19, 1992 (#92000104)	Southeast side of Washington Harbor; 45°23′59″N 86°55′22″W	Washington Island	267-foot bulk steamer built in 1887 in Marine City, Michigan. Driven aground at Death's Door in a snowstorm Nov. 2, 1913, while heading for Escanaba to pick up a load of iron ore.
41	Lumberman shipwreck (schooner)		January 14, 2009 (#08001331)	10 miles (16 km) north of Wind Point; 42°52′10″N 87°45′25″W	Oak Creek	126-foot 3-masted wooden-hulled schooner, built in 1862 to carry forest products around Lake Michigan. Capsized in a storm in 1893.
42	Major Anderson (barkentine) Shipwreck	Major Anderson (barkentine) Shipwreck	October 15, 2014 (#14000866)	Lake Michigan near mouth of Molash Cr. 44°10′57″N 87°30′40″W	Two Rivers	154-foot wooden barkentine schooner built in 1861 in Cleveland. Sank in a gale in 1871 while carrying a load of coal from Erie to Chicago.
10	Margaret A. Muir Shipwreck (Schooner)	Margaret A. Muir Shipwreck (Schooner)	June 23, 2025 (#100011949)	Off the Algoma harbour entrance 44°35′15″N 87°23′13″W	Algoma vicinity	129-foot wood-hulled 3-masted schooner built by Hanson and Scove's shipyard in Manitowoc for David Muir of Chicago. Hauled wheat, coal and iron ore around the Great Lakes until September of 1893, when she sank in a storm, carrying a load of barrel salt. Only the ship's dog was lost.
43	Material Service (shipwreck)	Material Service (shipwreck)	March 25, 2014 (#14000074)	Lake Michigan, northeast of Calumet Harbor; 41°44′33″N 87°30′23″W	North Township	Unique self-unloading service barge built in 1929 in Sturgeon Bay, Wisconsin by the Leathem D. Smith Shipbuilding & Dry Dock Company. She sank in 1936 storm with the loss of 15 lives.
44	Meridian (schooner) Shipwreck Site		March 21, 1996 (#96000294)	Sister Island Shoals; 45°12′01″N 87°10′10″W	Sister Bay	120-foot schooner built in 1848 at Black River, Ohio. Hauled timber around the Great Lakes for 25 years until October of 1873, when she was driven by a fall storm onto the Sister Islands shoal in Green Bay and wrecked.
45	Milwaukee (steam screw) Shipwreck	Milwaukee (steam screw) Shipwreck	July 27, 2015 (#15000479)	3 mi. E. of Fox Point; 43°08′11″N 87°49′56″W	Fox Point	A Milwaukee was a steel hulled train ferry built in 1902 by the American Shipbuilding Company of Cleveland, Ohio as the Manistique-Marquette & Northern No.1. She hauled cars of freight until 1929, when she sank with all hands in a storm. Her wreck sits in 120 feet (37 m) of water.
46	Mojave Shipwreck (Barkentine)	Mojave Shipwreck (Barkentine)	June 4, 2024 (#100010469)	12.5 miles (20.1 km) northeast of the Sheboygan Lighthouse; 43°48′23″N 87°27′16″W	Mosel vicinity	136-foot 3-masted wood-hulled barkentine built in 1863 in Stewart McDonald's shipyard in Detroit - built to fit through the Welland Canal. She hauled hay, wood and wheat around the Great Lakes. In November 1864, hauling wheat from Chicago to Buffalo, she sank in a storm off Sheboygan, with five men lost.
47	Montgomery shipwreck (schooner)		September 13, 2019 (#100004377)	O.45 miles east of Whistling Straights Golf Course; 43°51′07″N 87°43′10″W	Mosel	136-foot wooden schooner built in 1853 by J. Oades of Clayton, NY and rigged as a barkentine named Northern Light. In 1866 a second centerboard was added and she was rerigged as a 3-masted schooner. In November 1890, hauling 700 tons of coal, a gale drove her onto rocks where she broke up.
48	Muskegon Shipwreck Site	Muskegon Shipwreck Site	April 26, 1989 (#89000290)	Off the coast of Michigan City; 41°43′00″N 86°56′00″W	Michigan City	A passenger and package freight vessel that burned down at Michigan City, Indiana, while she was unloading a cargo of sand.
49	Niagara (steamer)	Niagara (steamer)	December 16, 1996 (#96001456)	one mile off shore 43°29′19″N 87°46′30″W	Belgium	The wreck of the Niagara, a 225-foot side-wheeled steamboat built in 1846 in Buffalo. Caught fire and sank in 1856, taking the lives of 60 of its 300 passengers.
50	Northerner Shipwreck (Schooner)	Northerner Shipwreck (Schooner)	December 10, 2010 (#10001005)	5 miles southeast of Port Washington Harbor in Lake Michigan; 43°18′53″N 87°49′27″W	Grafton	81-foot lakeshoring schooner, built in 1850 by John Oades of Clayton, NY. In 1868 she was damaged while loading wood, started leaking badly, and sank off Port Ulao while being towed to Milwaukee for repair.
51	Ocean Wave (Shipwreck)		July 19, 2006 (#06000639)	2 mi. off Whitefish Point; 44°53′07″N 87°09′08″W	Lake Michigan	Wooden scow schooner built 1860 at Harrison's Island, Michigan. Sank in a storm September 23, 1869, hauling limestone.
52	Pathfinder (schooner) Shipwreck	Pathfinder (schooner) Shipwreck	October 5, 2015 (#15000712)	2.6 mi. N. of Rawley Point Light Station; 44°14′44″N 87°30′41″W	Two Creeks	190-foot three-masted wooden schooner with an unusual keelson, built in Detroit in 1869. In November of 1886, carrying a load of iron ore from Marquette, a squall drove her ashore, where she now sits under 12 to 15 feet of water in quicksand, largely intact.
53	Pilot Island NW Site	Pilot Island NW Site	March 19, 1992 (#92000103)	Off the coast of Pilot Island; 45°17′05″N 86°55′03″W	Washington	Wrecks of three wooden ships commingled on the reef SW of the island: the 115-foot scow-schooner Forest built in 1857 and wrecked by a storm in October of 1891, the 147-foot schooner A.P. Nichols built in 1861 and wrecked by a storm in October of 1892, and the 138-foot canaller-schooner J.E. Gilmore, built in 1867 and wrecked by another storm only 11 days after the Nichols.
54	R.J. Hackett (steamer)	R.J. Hackett (steamer)	May 21, 1992 (#92000464)	Whaleback Shoal in Green Bay, 9.5 miles (15.3 km) southeast of the Cedar River in Menominee County, Michigan; 45°21′28″N 87°10′55″W	Green Bay	The R.J. Hackett was a steamer built in 1869 by shipbuilder Elihu M. Peck. When first launched, the ship's wide cross-section and long midships hold was an unconventional design, but the design's relative advantages in moving cargo through the inland lakes spawned many imitators. The Hackett is recognized as the very first Great Lakes freighter, a vessel type that has dominated Great Lakes shipping for over 100 years. In 1905, the Hackett caught fire and sank on Whaleback Shoal in Green Bay, 9.5 miles (15.3 km) southeast of the Cedar River. The wreck slipped slightly off the reef, and currently sits in 10 -14 feet of water.
55	Robert C. Pringle (tug) Shipwreck	Robert C. Pringle (tug) Shipwreck	December 14, 2020 (#100005902)	8 miles (13 km) SE of the Sheboygan, Wisconsin harbor entrance in Lake Michigan; 43°41′30″N 87°33′18″W	Wilson	101-foot wood-hulled screw steamer built in 1903 by Manitowoc Shipbuilding. Carried package freight around the Apostle Islands briefly, then carried passengers to Whitefish Bay Park until 1908 for Frederick Pabst. Sank in June 1922 while towing the steamer Venezuela for the Pringle Barge Line, after hitting a submerged object.
56	Rosinco	Rosinco	July 18, 2001 (#01000737)	12 miles (19 km) east of Kenosha; 42°37′30″N 87°38′14″W	Lake Michigan	Originally called the Georgiana III, the Rosinco was built in 1916 by well-known shipbuilders Harlan and Hollingsworth of Wilmington, Delaware. She sank in 1925 after striking some floating timbers. Today she lies intact in 195 feet (59 m) of water.
57	Rouse Simmons (Shipwreck)	Rouse Simmons (Shipwreck)	March 21, 2007 (#07000197)	6 mi (9.7 km). off Point Beach; 44°16′45″N 87°24′52″W	Lake Michigan	The Christmas Tree Ship. 124-foot 3-masted double-centerboard lumber schooner built in 1868. Later in her career she was used to haul Christmas trees from Thompson, Michigan to Chicago, and sank in November 1912, with all hands lost.
58	S.C. Baldwin Shipwreck (barge)	S.C. Baldwin Shipwreck (barge)	August 22, 2016 (#16000565)	2.3 miles (3.7 km) SSE of Rawley Point Light in Lake Michigan; 44°11′35″N 87°27′12″W	Two Rivers	160-foot wooden steam barge built in 1871 to carry iron ore from Escanaba to Milwaukee and Chicago. Later carried lumber and coal until it sank in Green Bay in 1903. Raised and repurposed for hauling limestone out of Sturgeon Bay until she sank in August of 1908, losing one man.
59	Selah Chamberlain (bulk carrier) Shipwreck	Selah Chamberlain (bulk carrier) Shipwreck	January 7, 2019 (#100003288)	2 miles NE of Sheboygan Pt. in Lake Michigan; 43°46′12″N 87°39′24″W	Sheboygan	The Selah Chamberlain was a 212-foot wooden bulk carrier built in 1873, in Cleveland by the Quayle & Murphy shipyard. She hauled bulk cargoes such as iron ore, coal and grain between Duluth and Buffalo. She sank in 1886, with the loss of five lives, after a collision with the John Pridgeon Jr. Her wreck lies in 90 feet (27 m) of water.
60	Senator (steam screw) Shipwreck	Senator (steam screw) Shipwreck	April 12, 2016 (#15000738)	16 miles off Port Washington; 43°20′08″N 87°34′11″W	Port Washington vicinity	410-foot steam screw built in 1896 by the Detroit Dry Dock Company. In October 1929, heading from Milwaukee to Detroit carrying 241 (or 268?) Nash autos, she collided with the Marquette in a heavy fog and sank quickly, with 7 men lost.
61	Sidney O. Neff Shipwreck (steambarge)	Sidney O. Neff Shipwreck (steambarge)	November 7, 2022 (#100008394)	.35 miles (0.56 km) southwest of the Marinette Harbor entrance in Green Bay; 45°05′31″N 87°34′37″W	Marinette vicinity	150 feet (45.7 m) wood-hulled two-masted schooner-barge built in 1890 in Manitowoc by Burger & Burger for S. Neff & Sons to be towed to haul lumber by the steamer St. Joseph. After various sales and rebuilds, by the time it was scuttled in 1940, it was one of the last wooden commercial ships on the Great Lakes.
62	Silver Lake (scow-schooner) Shipwreck	Silver Lake (scow-schooner) Shipwreck	March 27, 2013 (#13000128)	7 miles (11 km) northeast of Sheboygan in Lake Michigan; 43°48′21″N 87°34′42″W	Mosel vicinity	98.5 foot scow-schooner with double centerboard, built by M.L. Johnson in Little Point Sable, Michigan, in 1889. Hauled cargo around Lake Michigan until May, 1900, when she was run down by the car ferry Pere Marquette in a heavy fog.
63	Success (scow schooner) Shipwreck		October 5, 2015 (#15000711)	.13 mi. SW. of Whitefish Dunes State Park; 44°54′59″N 87°12′10″W	Sevastopol	151-ton 2-masted scow schooner built in 1875 in Manitowoc. Hauled lumber on Lake Michigan until November 1896, when she was pushed aground by a storm while loading in Whitefish Bay. Still quite intact, with wire rigging, deadeyes, bilge pump and centerboard present.
64	Tennie and Laura (Shipwreck)	Tennie and Laura (Shipwreck)	April 11, 2008 (#08000288)	9 miles off shore from Port Washington; 43°15′39″N 87°43′38″W	Port Washington	73-foot scow-schooner built by Gunder Jorgenson in Manitowoc in 1876. In 1903, running from Muskegon to Milwaukee under Captain John Sather with a load of lumber, she sank in a storm ten miles from her destination, with one crewman lost.
65	Transfer (self-unloading barge) Shipwreck	Transfer (self-unloading barge) Shipwreck	November 15, 2021 (#100007124)	6 miles southeast of the Milwaukee Harbor Breakwater Lighthouse; 43°01′05″N 87°45′51″W	Milwaukee	200 feet (61.0 m) wooden-hulled craft built in Gibraltar, Michigan in 1872 as the 3-masted schooner-barge William McGregor, to be towed carrying iron ore from Lake Superior to Lake Erie ports for thirty years. Refitted in 1911 as a self-unloading tow barge Transfer to ferry coal from Milwaukee's coal yards to powerhouses. Scuttled in 1923.
66	Trinidad Shipwreck (Schooner)	Trinidad Shipwreck (Schooner)	July 3, 2024 (#100010476)	9.5 miles (15.3 km) east of Algoma Light; 44°34′30″N 87°12′08″W	Algoma	138-foot wood-hulled 2-masted canal schooner, built in 1867 by William Keefe at Grand Island, New York. For most of her early years, she carried iron and coal to Chicago and Milwaukee, and grain back to Oswego. In May of 1881, hauling a load of coal from Oswego to Milwaukee, the neglected ship began taking on water and sank off Algoma. The crew escaped in a yawl, but the mascot dog went down with the ship.
67	Tubal Cain (barque) Shipwreck	Tubal Cain (barque) Shipwreck	December 4, 2017 (#100001873)	1.33 miles (2.14 km) NE of Two Rivers harbor entrance in L. Michigan; 44°09′22″N 87°32′32″W	Two Rivers vicinity	137-foot wooden canal barque built in 1866 by J.M. Jones of Detroit, built to carry grain between Chicago and New York via the Welland Canal. On Nov 26, 1867, heading out from Milwaukee carrying 18,000 bushels of wheat, she ran ashore just off Two Rivers, and settled into quicksand.
68	Walter B. Allen (canaller) Shipwreck	Walter B. Allen (canaller) Shipwreck	November 10, 2011 (#11000811)	7 miles northeast of Sheboygan in Lake Michigan; 43°49′49″N 87°36′31″W	Mosel	2-masted schooner-rigged canaller, built in 1866 in Ogdensburg, NY, sized to just fit through the Welland Canal locks. Hauled grain east from Chicago to Buffalo or Oswego and coal west. Sank while being towed through a storm in 1880 and now sits under 175 feet of water, very intact.
69	Wisconsin shipwreck (iron steamer)	Wisconsin shipwreck (iron steamer)	October 7, 2009 (#09000820)	6.5 miles (10.5 km) south-southeast of Kenosha; 42°31′58″N 87°42′31″W	Kenosha	Early iron hulled passenger and package freight vessel built in 1881 by the Detroit Dry Dock Company of Wyandotte, Michigan. She was nearly destroyed by a fire in 1907. She sank in 1929 with the loss of 9 lives after her cargo shifted.

== Lake Erie ==
	Name on the Register	Image	Date listed	Location	City or town	Description
1	Anthony Wayne Shipwreck	Anthony Wayne Shipwreck	January 2, 2018 (#100001932)	About 8 miles off Vermilion. 41°31′00″N 82°23′00″W	Vermilion vicinity	A 156-foot sidewheel steamer that was built in 1837 by Samuel L. Hubbel of Perrysburg, Ohio. She sank in 1850 about eight miles north of Vermilion, Ohio after her boilers exploded. She is the second oldest shipwreck in Ohio waters (after the recently discovered schooner Lake Serpent), and the oldest known wreck of a steamship in the Great Lakes.
2	Dunkirk Schooner Site	Dunkirk Schooner Site	May 1, 2009 (#09000285)	About 20 miles off Dunkirk, New York; 42°33′00″N 79°36′00″W	Dunkirk	Remains of an early, unidentified Great Lakes schooner resting in 170 feet (52 m) of water.

== Lake Ontario ==
	Name on the Register	Image	Date listed	Location	City or town	Description
1	St. Peter, (Shipwreck)	St. Peter, (Shipwreck)	March 22, 2004 (#04000226)	Near Pultneyville; 43°18′42″N 77°07′52″W	Pultneyville	135.7-foot schooner built in 1873 and sank in 1898. She lies in 110-feet of water.

== See also ==
- List of shipwrecks on the Great Lakes
- List of shipwrecks of western Lake Superior
- List of shipwrecks in the Thunder Bay National Marine Sanctuary
- List of storms on the Great Lakes
