= SS Marquette (1881) =

Wooden-hulled, American Great Lakes freighter

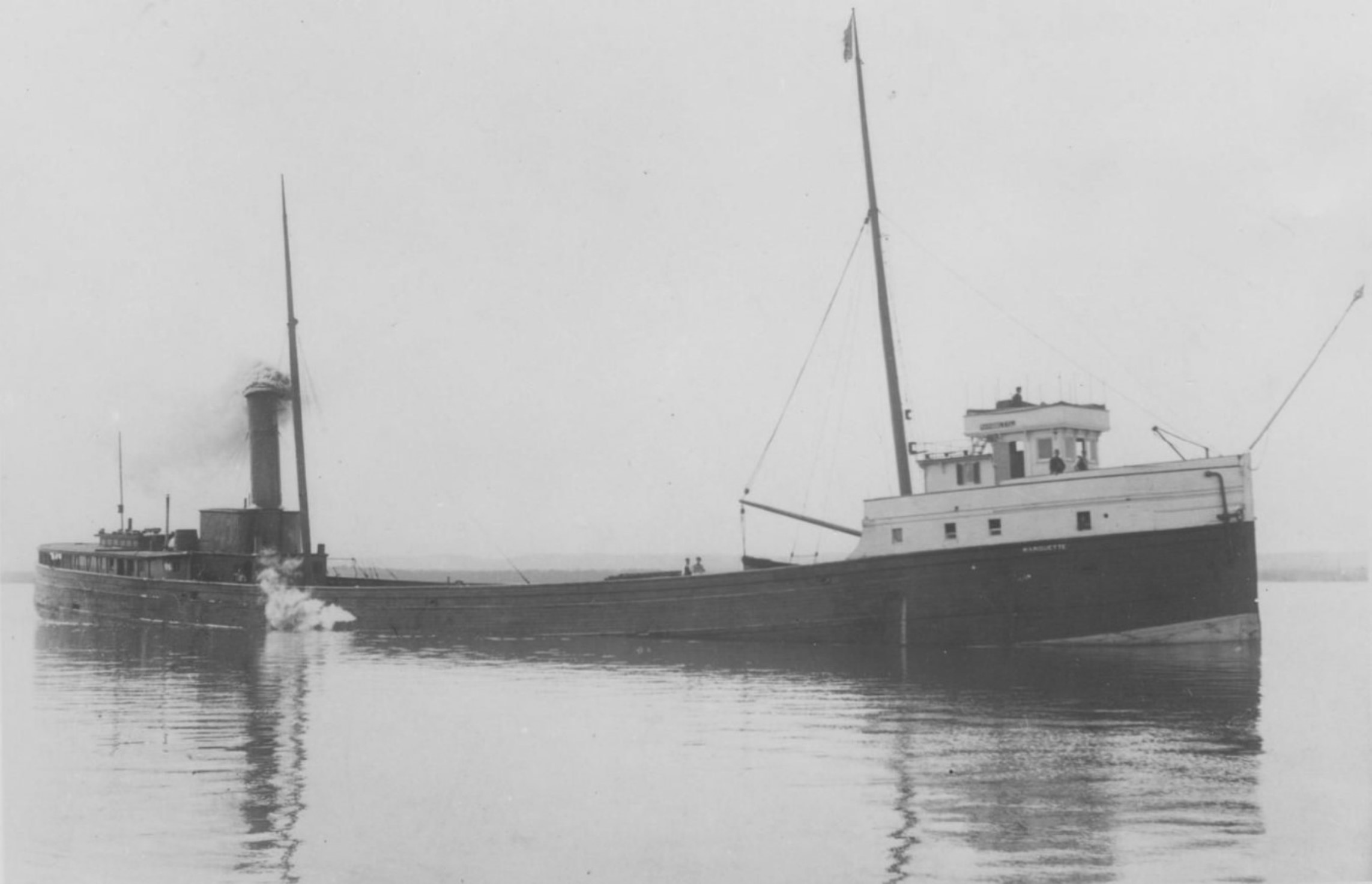
- The Marquette underway

History

United States
- Name: Marquette
- Operator: Gilchrist Transportation Company
- Port of registry: U.S. Registry #110465
- Builder: George Presley & Company
- Launched: April 21, 1881
- In service: May 16, 1881
- Fate: Sank October 15, 1903

General characteristics
- Type: Lake freighter
- Tonnage: 1,343.23 GRT; 1,117.91 NRT
- Length: 254 ft (77 m) LOA; 235 ft (72 m) LBP
- Beam: 35.58 ft (10.84 m)
- Depth: 18.42 ft (5.61 m)
- Installed power: 600 hp (450 kW) fore and aft compound steam engine
- MARQUETTE (shipwreck)
- U.S. National Register of Historic Places
- Location within Wisconsin Location within the United States
- Location: Five miles (8.0 km) miles east of Michigan Island
- Nearest city: La Pointe, Wisconsin
- Coordinates: 46.831867°N 90.429733°W
- Built: 1881
- Architect: George Presley
- MPS: Great Lakes Shipwreck Sites of Wisconsin MPS
- NRHP reference No.: 08000027
- Added to NRHP: February 13, 2008

SS Marquette was a wooden-hulled, American Great Lakes freighter built in 1881, that sank on Lake Superior, five miles east of Michigan Island, Ashland County, Wisconsin, Apostle Islands, United States on October 15, 1903. On the day of February 13, 2008 the remains of the Marquette were listed on the National Register of Historic Places.

== History ==
The Marquette (Official number 110465) was built as the Republic in 1881, in Cleveland, Ohio by George Presley & Company for the Republic Iron Company of Marquette, Michigan to be their new flagship. Her wooden hull had an overall length of 245 feet (75 m), and a between perpendiculars length of 235 feet (72 m). Her beam was 35.58 feet (10.84 m) wide and her hull was 18.42 feet (5.61 m) deep. She had a gross register tonnage of 1343.23 tons, and a net register tonnage of 1117.91 tons. She was powered by two 36-by-63-inch (91 cm × 160 cm) low pressure steam engine, and a 12-by-18-inch (30 cm × 46 cm) boiler.

The Republic was one of a transitional class of lake freighter that employed innovative hull strengthening technologies (such as iron strapping), that helped them accommodate greater gross register tonnage, and longer, stronger hulls.

She was launched on April 21, 1881. On May 10, 1881, the Republic made her maiden voyage to Marquette, Michigan, while towing the schooners Ironton, and the E.P. Beals. In May 1887 she grounded on Grand Island, Michigan. On May 15, 1890, while towing the schooner Grace Holland on Lake Superior, the Republic broke her crank pin of her aft engine after passing Lime Island. She was later towed to Cleveland, Ohio for repairs, where her old engine was replaced with a fore and aft compound engine that was built by the Globe Ironworks Company of Cleveland, Ohio. Later in 1890, the Republic was renamed Marquette.

== Final voyage ==
On October 14, 1903 the Marquette arrived in Ashland, Wisconsin, where she loaded 1319 tons of ore at the Central Ore Dock and 700 tons of ore at the Northwestern Ore Dock, that she would then take to Cleveland, Ohio. At around midnight, her crew reported a leak from an unknown source to Captain Caughill, who went below the decks to have a look at the leak. After seeing that water was entering at an alarming rate; he ordered all of the Marquette's pumps to be turned on, and ordered a course change to Michigan Island which was about 25 miles away. As she neared Michigan Island, she settled deeper and deeper into the water. At around 2:45 A.M., Captain Caughill ordered 13 of her crew to board the lifeboats. Captain Caughill, the second engineer, the second mate and a watchman stayed on the Marquette to guide her to Michigan Island. About an hour later, she foundered, and the four men abandoned her in a lifeboat. As she sank, air trapped below her decks blew her cabins off. She was valued at $65,000 and the cargo was valued at $50,000.

The Milwaukee Sentinel wrote a report on her sinking:

The Marquette had arrived at Ashhland, Wisconsin, light with no consort to take on a cargo of iron ore. On Wednesday, 14 October at 4:00 PM, she completed loading 1319 tons of ore at the Central Ore Dock and 700 tons of ore at the Northwestern Ore Dock. The Marquette was loaded near capacity when she departed for Cleveland. She headed out along the shipping lanes and made good time. At around midnight, the crew reported to Captain Caughill that the ship was taking on water from an unknown source. The captain went below deck and found that the water was entering at an alarming rate. He ordered the pumps started and head to Michigan Island, the nearest land, which he judged to be about 25 miles away. As the ship raced for the island, she settled further into the water, slowing her progress with each passing minute. By 2:45 Am, the situation began to look grim. Captain Caughill advised most of the 13 man crew to take to the lifeboats, leaving only himself, the second engineer, the second mate and a watchman to guide the ship to the beach. The ten men who took to the lifeboats began rowing for Michigan Island, some five miles away. On board the Marquette, the four remaining men readied a lifeboat in case the Marquette should founder before reaching shore. Scarcely an hour had passed when the vessel began to founder rapidly. the men took the lifeboat and pulled away from the wreck just in time to avoid her suction vortex as she plunged for the bottom.

There was a theory that the Marquette was scuttled for financial reasons, as she was one of five vessels lost by the J.C. Gilchrist fleet in 1903: the V. Swain was lost in July, the Moonlight and the A.A. Parker were lost in September and the Manhattan and the Marquette in October.

== Discovery ==
The wreck was discovered in 2005, but divers did not reach it until the following year. Mapping and documenting the shipwreck was a joint venture between the Great Lakes Shipwreck Preservation Society, the Wisconsin Historical Society - State Historic Preservation Office, and the Great Lakes Shipwreck Research Foundation.

== Wrecksite ==
The remains of the Marquette rest in 215 feet (66 m) of water about five miles (8.0 km) east of Michigan Island. As her superstructure broke away when she sank, the hull is progressively broken from bow (which is almost intact) to stern. Her wreck is at a heading of 135 degrees, facing away from Michigan Island. Although her hull is broken, it features an intact, and upright engine and propeller, and most of her hull is covered with iron ore. Her hull is also surrounded by a number of artefacts including: her boiler (which lies off to her port side), her smokestack, numerous pieces of china. The Marquette was listed on the Wisconsin State Register of Historic Places on July 20, 2007 and on the National Register of Historic Places on February 13, 2008. These listings protect the wreck from potential claimants and divers who would pilfer artefacts.
