= SS J. M. Allmendinger =

Wooden-hulled steam barge wrecked in Lake Michigan

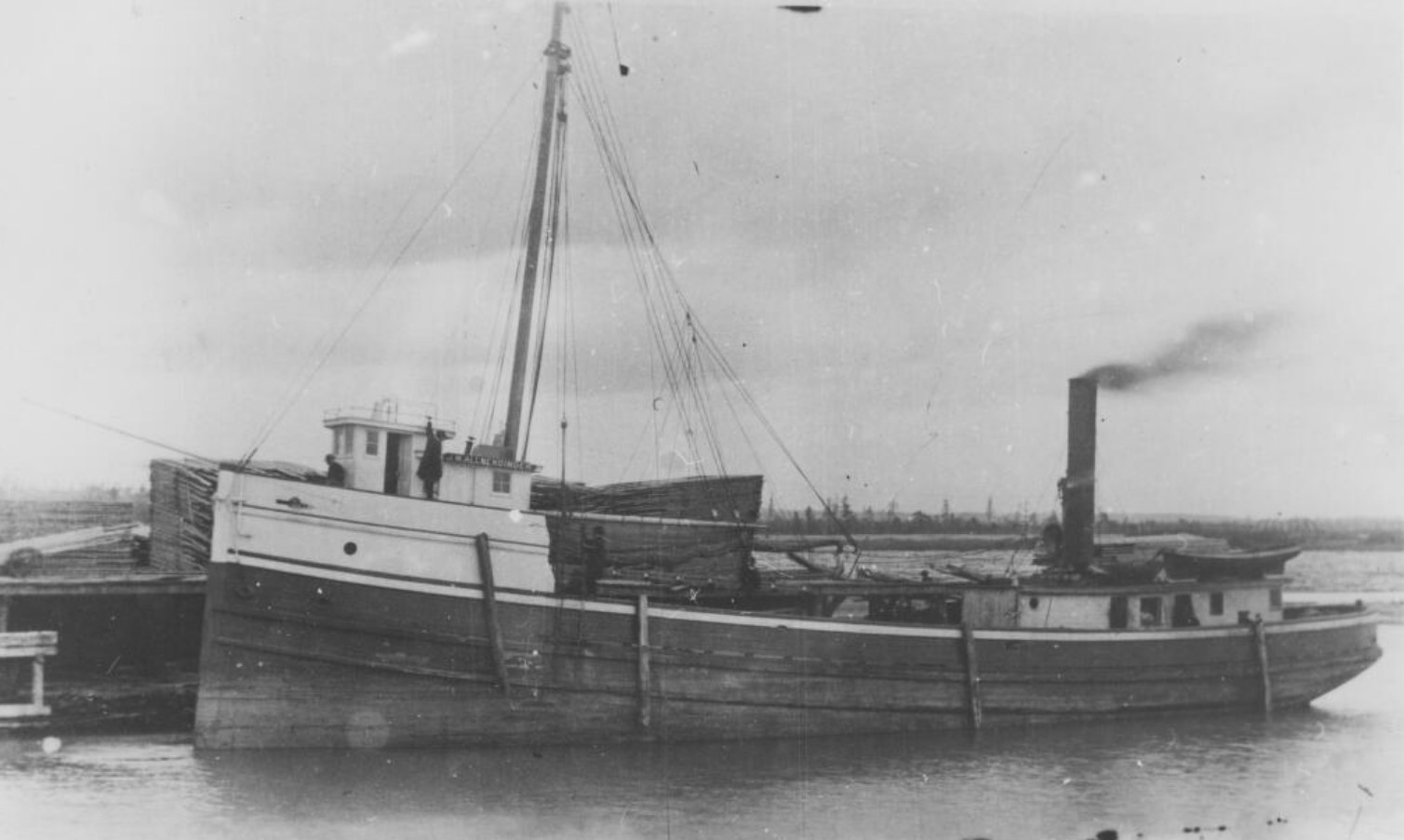
- J. M. Allmendinger prior to her sinking

History

United States
- Name: J. M. Allmendinger
- Owner: E. B. Simpson
- Port of registry: United States, Milwaukee, Wisconsin
- Builder: Albert Burgoyne
- Launched: 1883
- In service: 1883
- Identification: U.S. Registry #76411
- Fate: Wrecked November 26, 1895

General characteristics
- Tonnage: 230.94 GRT; 207.04 NRT
- Length: 104 ft (32 m)
- Beam: 24.33 ft (7.42 m)
- Depth: 10 ft (3.0 m)
- Installed power: Fore and aft compound steam engine

National Register of Historic Places data
J. M. Allmendinger (Steambarge) Shipwreck
U.S. National Register of Historic Places
Location within Wisconsin Location within the United States
Location	2.5 mi (4.0 km) SSE of Concordia U. in Lake Michigan
Nearest city	Mequon, Wisconsin
Coordinates	43.218117°N 87.894183°W
Built	1883
Architect	Albert Burgoyne
Architectural style	Steam barge
MPS	Great Lakes Shipwreck Sites of Wisconsin MPS
NRHP reference No.	100003012
Added to NRHP	October 11, 2018

SS J. M. Allmendinger was a wooden-hulled steam barge built in 1883, that ran aground during a storm on November 26, 1895, on Lake Michigan, off the coast of Mequon, Ozaukee County, Wisconsin, United States. On October 11, 2018, the remains of J. M. Allmendinger were listed on the National Register of Historic Places.

== History ==
J. M. Allmendinger (Official number 76411) was built in 1883 by Albert Burgoyne of Benton Harbor, Michigan for John Allmendinger and Samuel Hull, two wholesalers and retailers of fruit. She was named after John Allmendinger. She had a length of 104 feet (32 m), her beam was 24.33 feet (7.42 m) wide and her cargo hold was 10 feet (3.0 m) deep. She had a gross register tonnage of 230.94 tons, and a net register tonnage of 207.04 tons. She was powered by a fore and aft compound steam engine, and one boiler. She mostly carried lumber, but she also carried iron ore, shingles and sundries.

In May, 1887 the J. M. Allmendinger ran aground in Sturgeon Bay, Wisconsin and was freed by a passing tug. In 1888 she was remeasured, and she was rated 183.17 tons. In July 1889 the J. M. Allmendinger had fourteen of her stanchions damaged when the St. Paul Bridge in the Menominee River swung the bridge against her hull. In May 1890 on White Lake near Whitehall, Michigan while waiting for a storm to pass and was freed by the steamer Hilton. In May 1892 the J. M. Allmendinger stranded on a reef at North Point near Milwaukee, Wisconsin, and was freed by the tugs Welcome and Carl. In November 1893 she grounded twelve miles (19 km) north of Milwaukee and was freed by the tug Welcome and a lighter. In June 1894 the J. M. Allmendinger was towed to Manistee, Michigan by the tug J.L. Wheeler for repairs.

== Final voyage ==
On November 26, 1895, the J. M. Allmendinger was bound from Milwaukee to Sturgeon Bay, Wisconsin with a cargo of lumber. She eventually encountered a blizzard and was blown off course, grounding on a beach near Fox Point at around 3:00 A.M. She ended up about 500 feet (150 m) off Mequon, Wisconsin. Captain Peterson and his crew of eight were rescued by the life-saving crew. An April 24, 1897, issue of the Door County Advocate described her wreck:

The steambarge J. M. Allmendinger, which was driven ashore fourteen miles north of Milwaukee late in the season of 1895 and abandoned as a total loss, has at last gone to pieces and her timbers lie scattered along the beach. Not a vestige of the craft remains in sight at the point where she struck. From the time of her abandonment until well along in February the hull and upperworks remained intact and conveyed the idea to some the vessel might be rescued. But the constant beating of heavy seas resulting from the prevailing easterly winds finally disintegrated the hull, and when the collapse came it was of the most complete description, every vestige of the steamer being wiped out in a single night.

== The J. M. Allmendinger today ==
The remains of the J. M. Allmendinger were rediscovered in July 1934 by Max Nohl, Jack Browne, and Verne Netzow, who worked with a raft, homemade diving helmets and oxygen tanks to recover portions of the wreckage. Her wreck lies 2.5 miles (4.0 km) south of Concordia University in Mequon, Wisconsin about 1,035 feet (315 m) from shore in 12 feet (3.7 m) of water. The wreckage consists of the keelson, the lower frames, the rudder, the boiler and the steam drum attached to the boiler.
