= Margaret A. Muir (schooner) =

19th-century American schooner

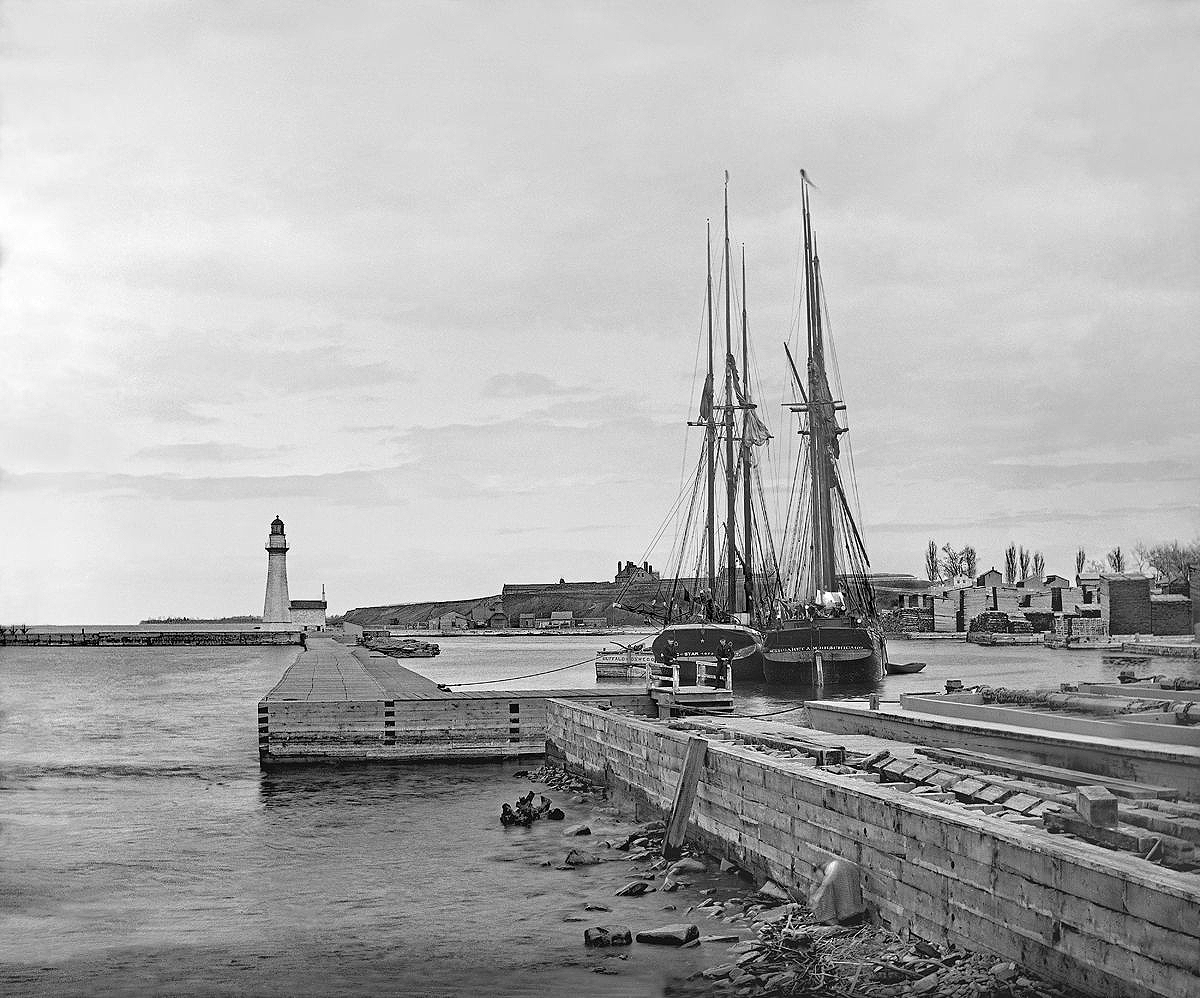
- Margaret Muir (right) docked in Oswego, New York

History
- Owner: David Muir (1872-1893), David Muir and David Clow(1893)
- Builder: Jasper Hanson and H.M. Scove Shipyard
- Laid down: 1872
- Launched: 1872
- Fate: Sunk in storm, no hands lost 1893

General characteristics
- Class & type: Schooner
- Tonnage: 347.44
- Length: 128.6 ft
- Beam: 26.2 ft
- Depth of hold: 11.50 ft
- Propulsion: Sail

Margaret A. Muir was an American schooner that sank in a storm on Lake Michigan, United States, on September 30, 1893. Its wreckage was discovered in 50 ft (15 m) of water off Algoma, Wisconsin, on May 12, 2024.

== History ==
Margaret A. Muir, a wooden, 130-foot (40 m) three-masted schooner, was built in 1872 in Manitowoc, Wisconsin. For 21 years, the ship, which was originally built to carry grain, carried cargo across all five Great Lakes.

On the morning of September 30, 1893, Margaret A. Muir was carrying 4,375 barrels of salt from Bay City, Michigan, to South Chicago, Illinois. The ship's captain David Clow reported the ship was heading toward the Wisconsin coast and had cleared the Straits of Mackinac. At around 05:00, a 50 mph (80 km/h) storm hit the ship, and at around 07:30, the waves increased and began blowing over the ship's decks. As Margaret A. Muir neared the port of Ahnapee (now Algoma), Clow discovered several feet of water in the ship's hold and immediately ordered the crew to abandon ship. Almost as soon as Clow gave the order, the ship sank.

The crew of six made their way through the 15-foot (4.6 m) waves to shore, where townspeople took them to a hotel and provided them with dry clothes. The only fatality was the captain's dog and ship's mascot, which Clow called "an intelligent and faithful animal, and a great favorite with the captain and crew".

== Discovery of wreck ==
On May 12, 2024, 131 years after it sank, a group of maritime historians working with Wisconsin Underwater Archaeology Association discovered the wreck of Margaret A. Muir. The ship was found in 50 ft (15 m) of water and only a few miles away from Algoma Harbor. The deck had come off and the ship's sides had opened, exposing the structure and allowing researchers to see how it was constructed. The ship's deck gear, including its handpumps, bow windlass, capstan and two large anchors, remain intact. Archaeology groups in Wisconsin plan to nominate the site of the wreck for inclusion in the National Register of Historic Places.
