= Sheboygan Lighthouse =

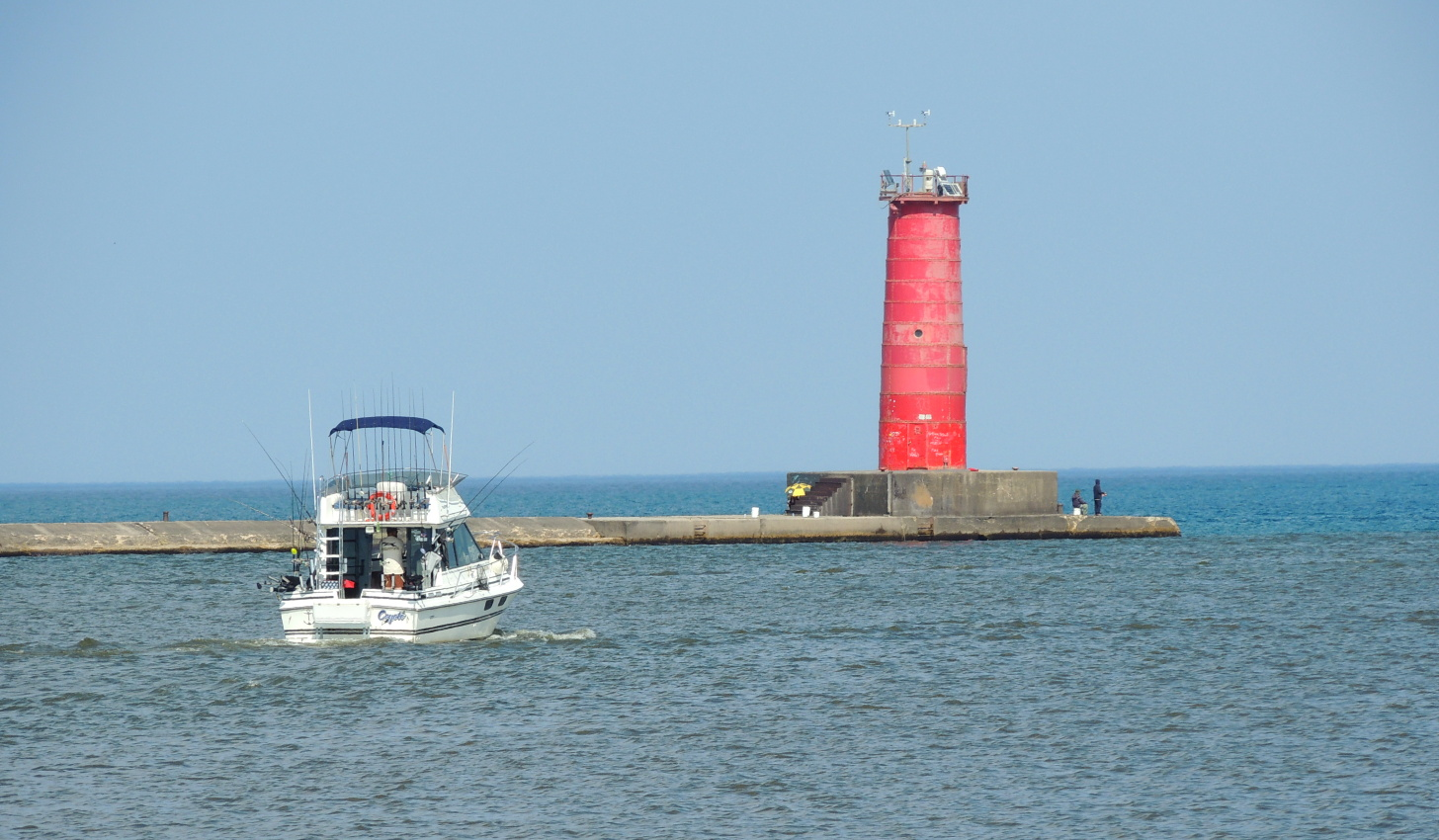
- Location: North Point in Sheboygan, Wisconsin
- Coordinates: 43.763°N 87.698°W approx.

Tower
- Construction: Brick (first); Wood frame (second)
- Shape: Conical tower (first); Dwelling with lantern on roof (second)

Light
- First lit: 1839
- Lens: reflectors; replaced with fifth order Fresnel lens

The Sheboygan Lighthouse stood on North Point in Sheboygan, Wisconsin. Improvements to the harbor rendered it obsolete, and it was deactivated in the early 20th century. The much altered second light survives as a private residence.

== History ==
Modern navigational beacon on the Sheboygan River north breakwater in 2020

The mouth of the Sheboygan River (then called the Chipewagan) was one of four sites examined in 1837 as possible sites for lights along the Wisconsin side of Lake Michigan. Examination of the site led to a favorable recommendation, and a light was erected on the bluffs at North Point (or North Sheboygan Point), north of the river mouth. This light, which was first lit in 1839, consisted of the typical brick tower and attached dwelling of the period. In 1857, the original lamp and reflector arrangement was upgraded to a fifth order Fresnel lens; however, by this date erosion threatened the structure, and a house was built further back in 1860. The new light was housed in a dwelling with the lantern on the roof.

The location of the light was (and is) some distance from the river, whose navigation was impeded by shoaling. In 1852 a series of improvements to the harbor commenced, beginning with a set of piers to delineate the channel. These piers were extended in stages, and were eventually supplemented by a breakwater which in turn was extended to shore, and which in the end supplanted most of the north pier. Each of these structures had a navigational light placed upon it, locally maintained at first, and then after 1873 by the lighthouse service. A 1905 upgrade to the north pierhead light rendered the older lighthouse superfluous, and it was deactivated that year. The old lighthouse was sold, and in 1916 it was moved further inland, where it still stands.
