= MV Material Service =

American self-unloading diesel powered workbarge

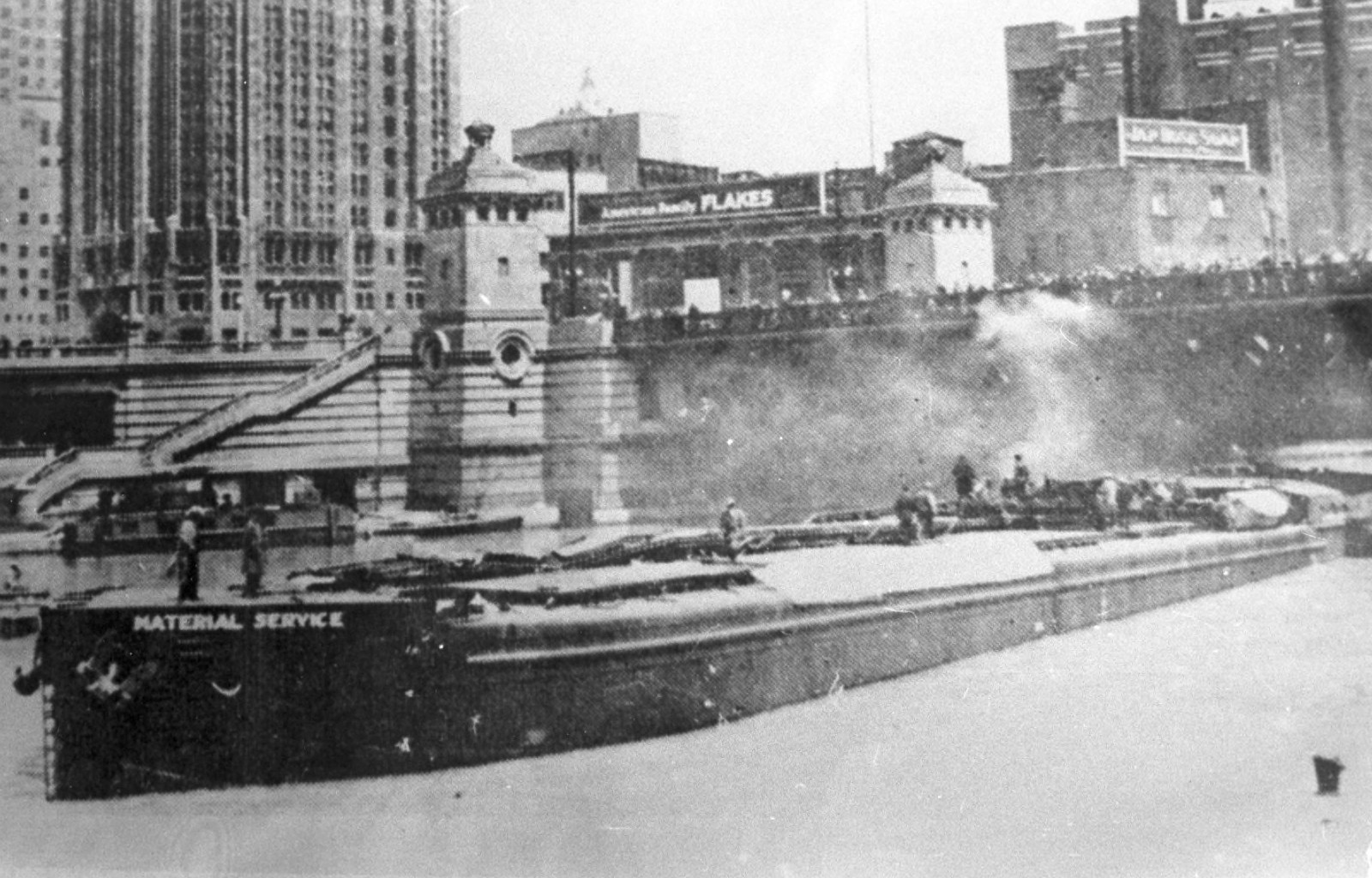
- The Material Service prior to her sinking

History

United States
- Name: Material Service
- Builder: Leathem D. Smith Shipbuilding & Dry Dock Company
- Yard number: 253
- Launched: 1929
- In service: 1929
- Out of service: July 29, 1936
- Identification: U.S. Official number 228371

General characteristics
- Type: Powered barge
- Tonnage: 1,077 GRT; 736 NRT
- Length: 239.58 ft (73.02 m)
- Beam: 40 ft (12 m)
- Depth: 13.75 ft (4.19 m)

National Register of Historic Places data
Material Service (shipwreck)
U.S. National Register of Historic Places
Location within Indiana Location within the United States
Location	Lake Michigan, northeast of Calumet Harbor
Nearest city	North Township, Lake County, Indiana
Coordinates	41.738833°N 87.503833°W
Built	1929
Architect	Leathem D. Smith Shipbuilding & Dry Dock Company
Architectural style	Barge
NRHP reference No.	14000074
Added to NRHP	March 25, 2014

The MV Material Service was a steel-hulled American self-unloading, diesel-powered workbarge that sank with the loss of fifteen lives on Lake Michigan off the coast of North Township, Lake County, Indiana. On March 25, 2014 the wreck of the Material Service was listed on the National Register of Historic Places.

== History ==
The Material Service (Official number 228371) was built as hull number #253 in 1929, in Sturgeon Bay, Wisconsin by the Leathem D. Smith Shipbuilding & Dry Dock Company, for the Leatham Smith-Putnam Navigation Company of Sturgeon Bay, Wisconsin, and she was on a ten-year lease to the Material Service Corporation of Chicago, Illinois. Her steel hull was 239.58 feet (73.02 m) long, her beam was 40 feet (12 m) wide, and her hull was 13.75 feet (4.19 m) deep. She had a gross register tonnage of 1,077 tons, and a net register tonnage of 736 tons. She was driven by two propellers that were powered by two 350-horsepower (260 kW) diesel engines.

She was built to carry sand from Lake Michigan to docks located in the Chicago River. Her shallow hull, and her lowerable A-frame were designed to permit passage under low bridges.
