= Samuel P. Ely (shipwreck) =

Schooner wrecked in Lake Superior

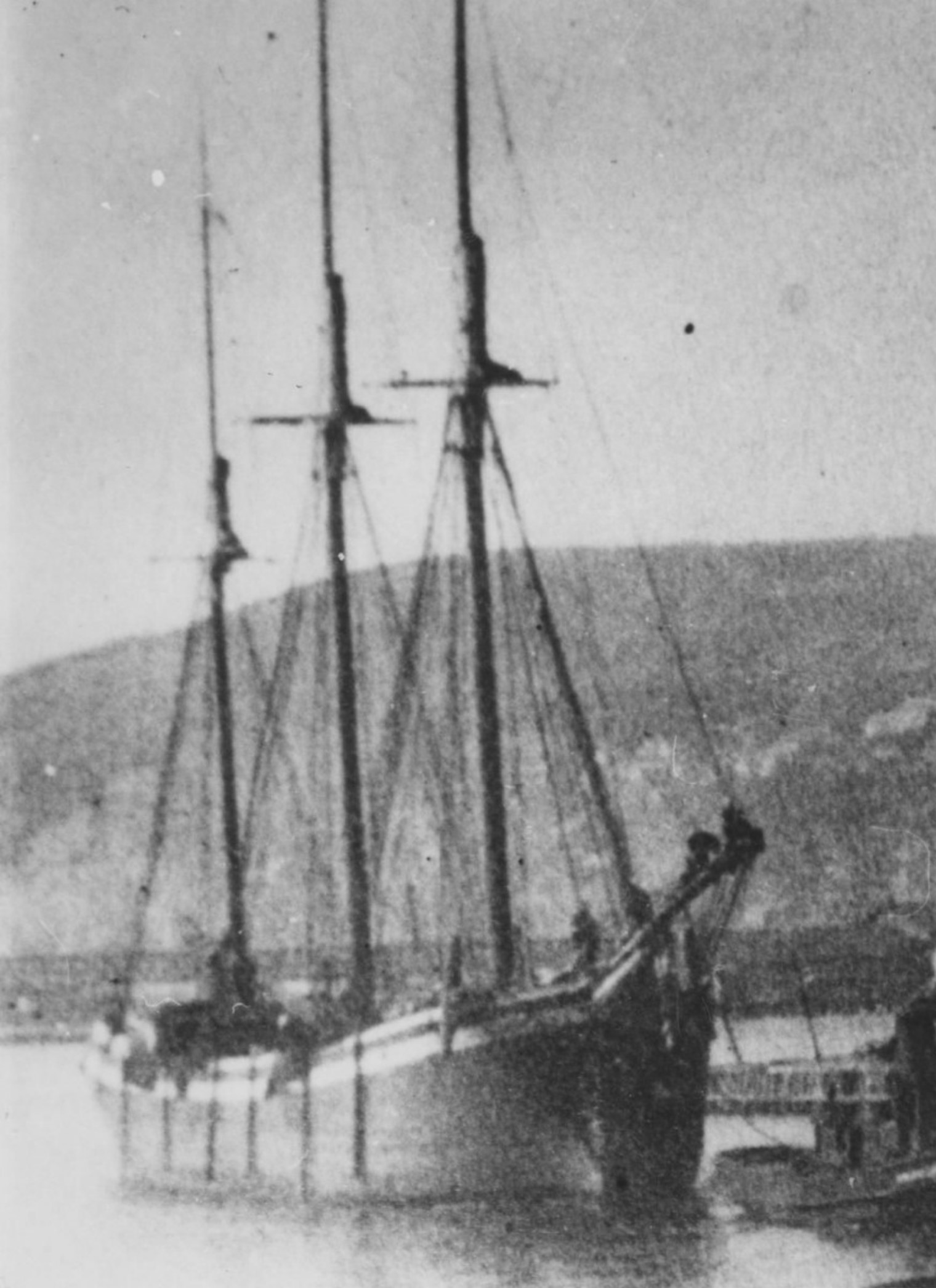
- The Samuel P. Ely

History

United States
- Operator: Winslow fleet (1869–1881); Bradley Transportation Company (1881–)
- Builder: J.P. Clark Shipyard
- Launched: 4 June 1869
- Identification: US Registry 23780
- Fate: Wrecked, 30 October 1896

General characteristics
- Type: Topsail schooner
- Tonnage: 627.24 GRT; 595.85 NRT
- Length: 200 ft (61 m)
- Beam: 31 ft (9.4 m)
- Depth: 13 ft (4.0 m)
- Capacity: 1,200 tons
- Samuel P. Ely Shipwreck
- U.S. National Register of Historic Places
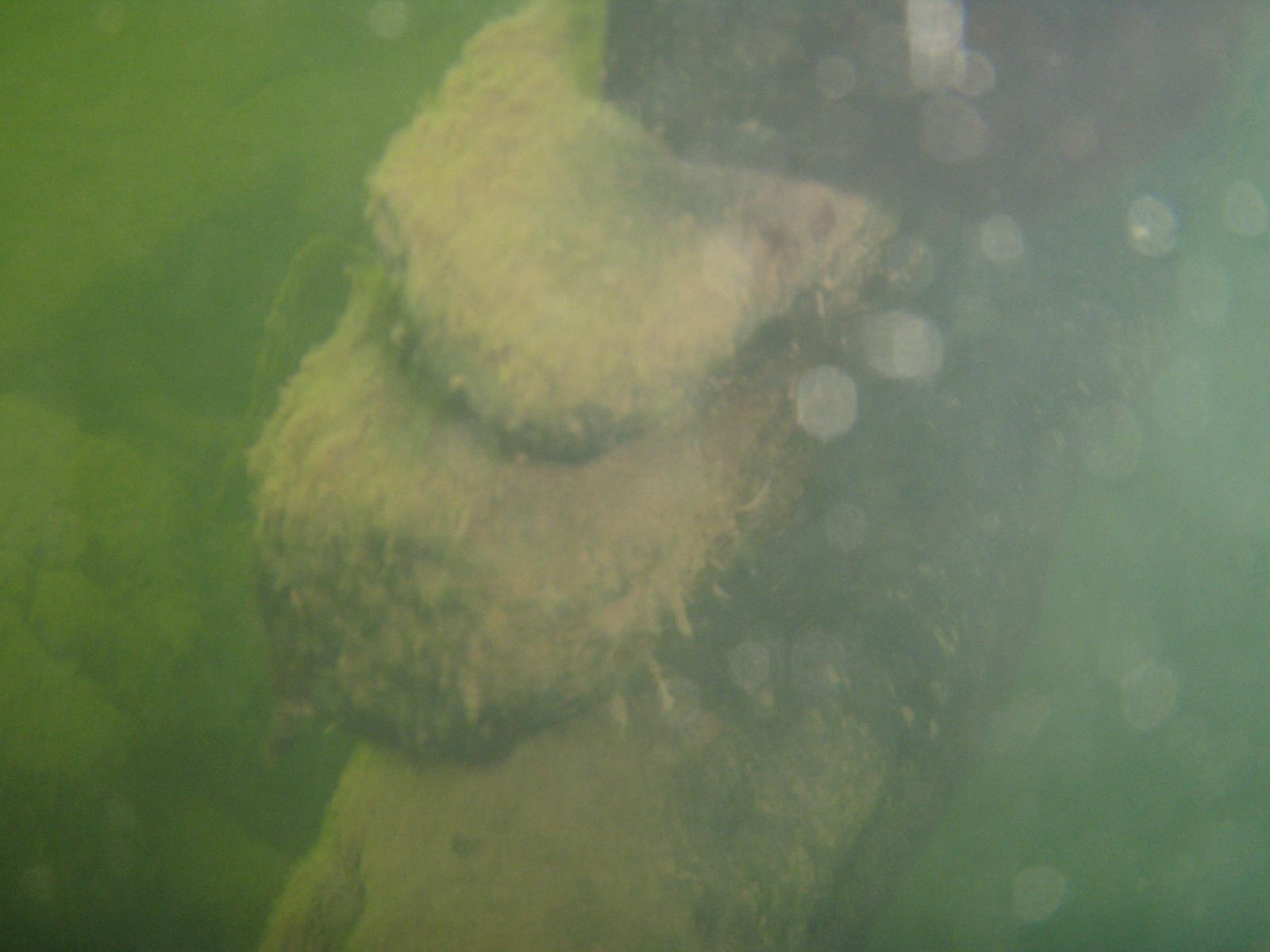
- A closeup of some of the wreckage of Samuel P. Ely.

- Location within Minnesota
- Nearest city: Two Harbors, Minnesota
- Coordinates: 47°0′42″N 91°40′40″W
- Built: 1869
- Architect: John Pearson Clark
- NRHP reference No.: 92000694
- Added to NRHP: 18 June 1992

Samuel P. Ely is a shipwreck in Two Harbors, Minnesota listed on the National Register of Historic Places. It was a schooner that sailed the Great Lakes carrying iron ore, coal, and other bulk freight. It was built in 1869 and was a fairly typical example of the 200-foot schooner built in the 1870s, though she was reinforced for the demands of carrying iron ore.

== Career ==
Samuel P. Ely first served in the Winslow fleet, often traveling from Escanaba, Michigan, to Cleveland, Ohio, and occasionally to Marquette, Michigan. In 1881, it was purchased by the Bradley Transportation Company of Cleveland. As part of the Bradley fleet, it often served the ore docks at Duluth, Minnesota, Ashland, Wisconsin, and Two Harbors, Minnesota. Later in its career, it was often towed as a barge behind a steamboat, Sarah E. Sheldon or other Bradley steamers.

Samuel P. Ely visited Two Harbors approximately 150 times between 1884 and 1896.

== The wreck ==
In October 1896, Samuel P. Ely traveled from Kelley's Island, Ohio to Duluth, Minnesota, in tow of Hesper and carrying a load of limestone. Hesper was also towing Negaunee, a similar barge. Hesper, along with Samuel P. Ely and Negaunee, reached Duluth on 27 October 1896. The two barges unloaded their limestone while Hesper unloaded her cargo of coal. On 29 October 1896, Hesper steamed up to Two Harbors with Negaunee and Samuel P. Ely in tow. A storm had impeded their progress to Two Harbors, with heavy headwinds and high seas, and Hesper was barely able to make it into port while towing Samuel P. Ely. Around 8:00 in the evening, Hesper had to cast off the towline, and although the crew of Samuel P. Ely dropped the anchors, they were unable to hold the ship, and she drifted toward the breakwater. Around midnight, she was wedged against the rocks of the breakwater and could not be moved. Finally, around 3:00 in the morning, Samuel P. Ely sank, although the crew was able to escape drowning by clinging to the rigging of the masts.

The next morning, many residents of Two Harbors were watching the scene from the shore, but any plan to rescue the crew was complicated by the possibility of the tugboat becoming entangled on the breakwater as well. Finally, someone devised a plan whereby the tugboat Ella G. Stone would travel close to the wreck and float a small sailboat out to the wreck while tethered on about 200 feet (61 m) of line. This plan was successful, although it took three trips to retrieve all ten men of the crew.

== Deterioration and preservation ==
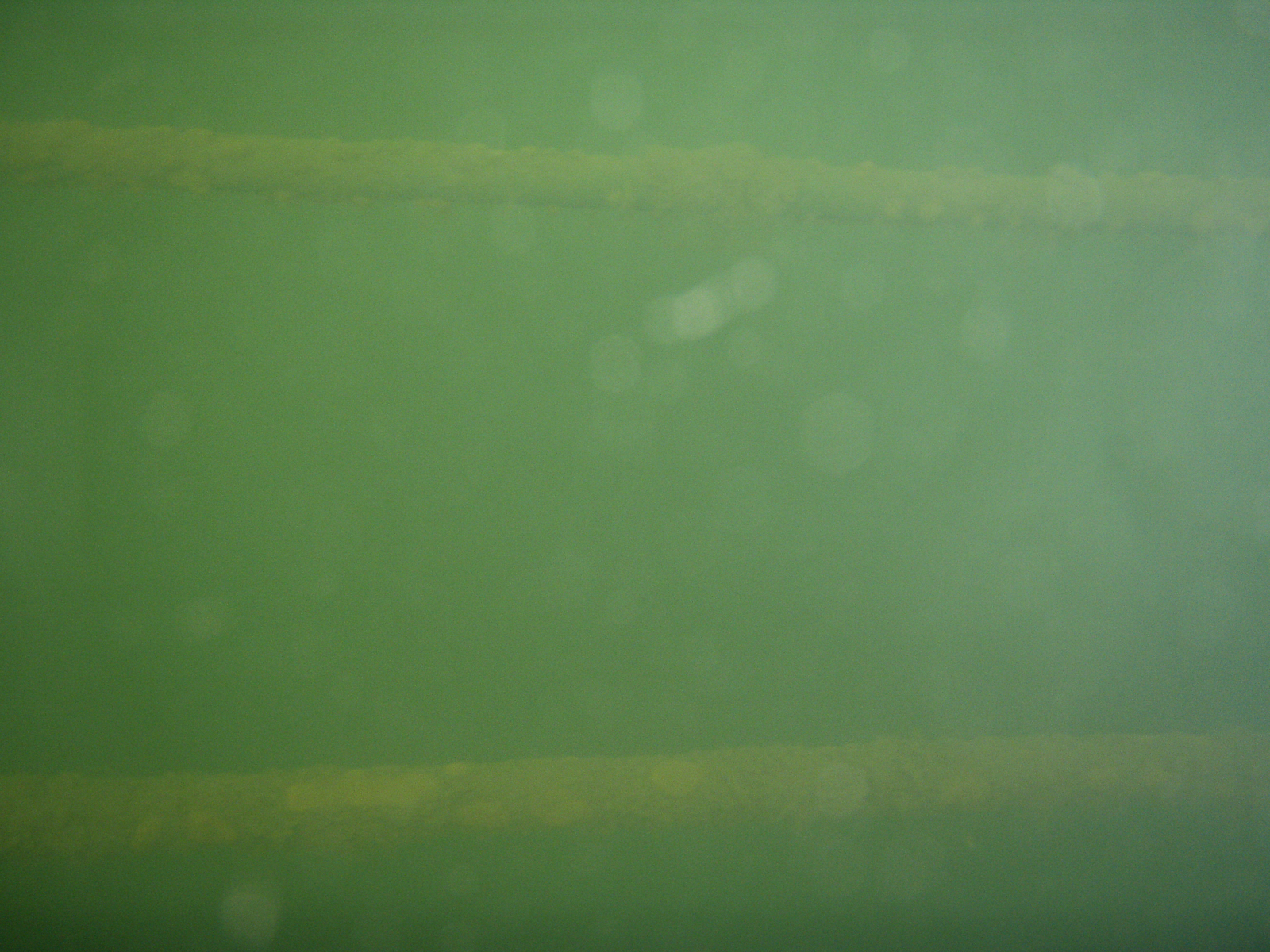
Two tie rods that help hold the hull together

Samuel P. Ely suffered further damage after she sank. The ship's location became known to recreational scuba divers in the mid to late 1950s, and local historians and divers noted that several items were removed from the wreck between 1958 and 1961. Several small pieces of equipment were removed at first. In 1961, a large wooden anchor was removed and put on display in someone's lawn in Superior, Wisconsin. The deck capstan was removed in 1974 and brought to Lake Superior Maritime Collections in Duluth. One of the deck winches was removed in 1978 and brought to the SS Meteor Marine Museum in Superior, while another winch was removed to an unknown location. There were also reports that divers had removed parts of the red oak deck planking to make furniture and picture frames. After the wreck was listed on the National Register of Historic Places in 1992, it became illegal to remove artifacts from the wreck.

High seas, repair work to the breakwater structure, and other forces have caused deterioration of the wreck. In 1994, a group of concerned divers began a project to preserve Samuel P. Ely, since the deck was starting to collapse into the hull. They performed a series of dives under the ice in March 1994 and lifted the deck through holes in the ice, then installed 3/4 inch steel tie rods to hold the sides of the hull together. After the sides of the hull were fastened into place, the deck was lowered back onto place onto the original ledges that supported it. The group also installed simple measuring devices to monitor the movement of the hull over time. This group later evolved into the Great Lakes Shipwreck Preservation Society. In 2001, members of the group returned to do some more strengthening work, including installing thicker steel rods with turnbuckles.
