= Dunkirk Schooner Site =

- U.S. National Register of Historic Places
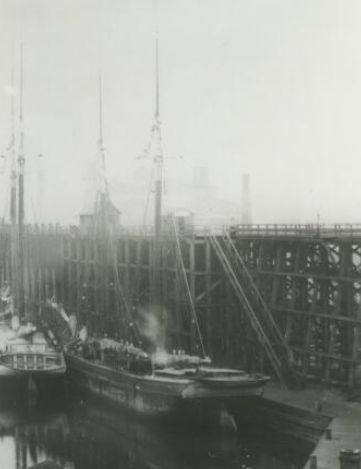
- The Speedwell which is of similar construction to the shipwreck

- Location within New York Location within the United States
- Location: Dunkirk, New York
- Coordinates: 42°33′0″N 79°36′0″W
- NRHP reference No.: 09000285
- Added to NRHP: May 1, 2009

Dunkirk Schooner Site is a historic shipwreck archaeological site located in Lake Erie off Dunkirk in Chautauqua County, New York. It lies about 20 miles (32 km) off Dunkirk resting in 170 feet (52 m) of cold freshwater, embedded on submerged lands of New York in the eastern basin of Lake Erie.

It was listed on the National Register of Historic Places in 2009.

== Identity of the Ship ==
The ship was a Great Lakes schooner, a two-masted wooden sailing ship, approximately 80 feet (24 m) in length on deck, 19 feet (5.8 m) in beam. While the ship has never been positively identified, there are two theories of its history. It may have been the Caledonia, built on the River Rouge near Detroit in 1799 and originally used in the fur trade in the early 19th century. It was commandeered by the British military at the outbreak of the War of 1812 and then captured by the Americans a year later. It was later sold to Pennsylvania merchants who renamed it the General Wayne and used it as part of the Underground Railroad to ferry runaway slaves to Canada until sinking sometime before 1850. An alternative theory is that it may be a nameless 1830s schooner that sank carrying grain.
