= Hetty Taylor shipwreck =

Schooner that sank in Lake Michigan

- Hetty Taylor (shipwreck)
- U.S. National Register of Historic Places
- Location within Wisconsin
- Location: Off the coast of Sheboygan, Wisconsin
- Coordinates: 43°40′53″N 87°39′18″W
- NRHP reference No.: 05000535
- Added to NRHP: June 1, 2005

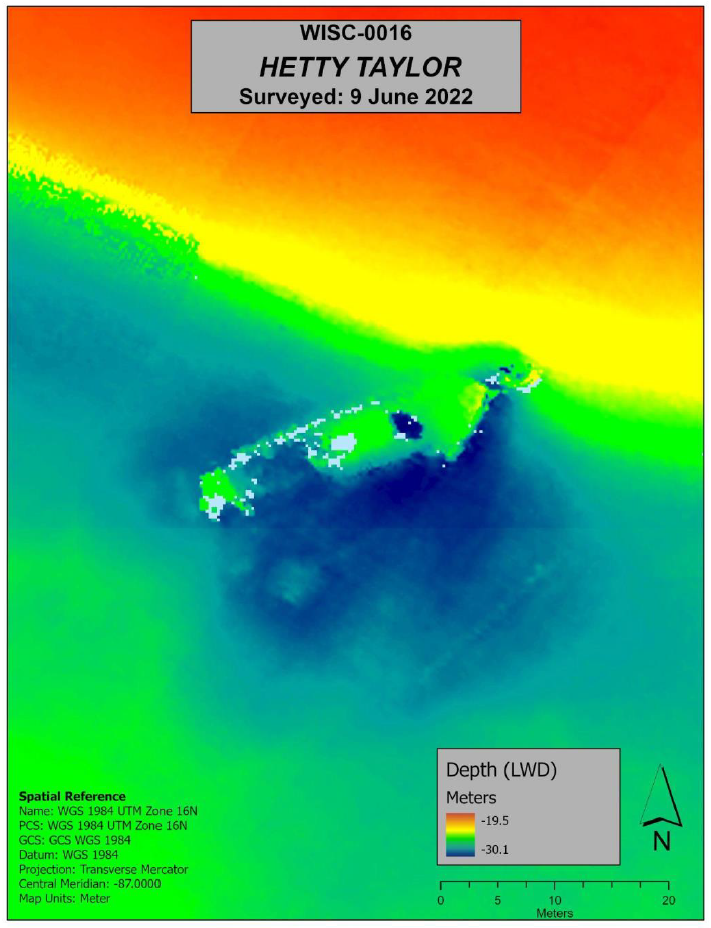
Sonar image of the wreck of Hetty Taylor, June 9, 2023.

Hetty Taylor was a schooner that sank in Lake Michigan off Sheboygan, Wisconsin, United States. In 2005 the shipwreck site was added to the National Register of Historic Places. It was included within the boundaries of the Wisconsin Shipwreck Coast National Marine Sanctuary in 2021.

== History ==
Hetty Taylor was launched in 1874. She mostly hauled wood products. The ship carried cargo from ports such as Muskegon, Michigan, and Green Bay, Sister Bay, and Egg Harbor, Wisconsin, to her home port in Milwaukee, Wisconsin. She also carried numerous types of cargo from Milwaukee to other ports.

On August 26, 1880, Hetty Taylor was in Lake Michigan on a voyage from Milwaukee to Escanaba, Michigan, when she encountered a sudden squall and capsized. Her crew of five rowed safely to shore in a small boat, hoping to find help and recover the ship before she sank. However, by the time they were able to return, it was too late. Hetty Taylor sank, coming to rest at 43°40.893′N 087°39.291′W in 105 to 110 feet (32 to 34 m) of water with 8 feet (2.4 m) of her main topmast protruding above the surface. Salvage efforts apparently were abandoned after late April 1881.
