= Big Bay sloop =

- Big Bay Sloop shipwreck (sloop)
- U.S. National Register of Historic Places
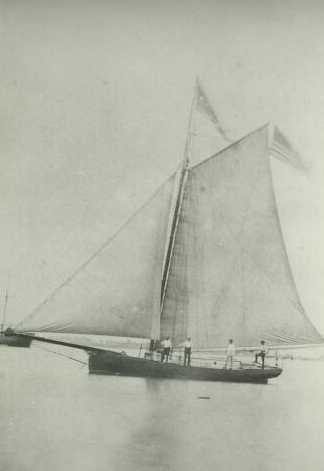
- The Humming Bird, a typical Great Lakes sloop

- Location within Wisconsin Location within the United States
- Location: Off the coast of Madeline Island, La Pointe, Wisconsin
- Coordinates: 46.808695°N 90.645633°W
- Area: Less than one acre
- Architectural style: Sloop
- MPS: Great Lakes Shipwreck Sites of Wisconsin MPS
- NRHP reference No.: 08001327
- Added to NRHP: January 14, 2009

The Big Bay Sloop is the name given to the unidentified remains of a sunken sloop in Lake Superior located off the coast of Madeline Island in La Pointe, Wisconsin, United States. The site was added to the National Register of Historic Places on January 14, 2009. Additionally, it is a designated National Marine Protected Area.

== History ==
The wreck was discovered east of Big Bay State Park in the 1990s. Uncertainty about the identity of the vessel is due to the lack of documentation of small craft on the Great Lakes. The wire rigging and metal cleat on the sloop indicate that it dates from sometime between 1880 and 1920. It is also believed that it was a merchant vessel. The shipwreck is the only known one of its kind in Wisconsin waters.
