= Tennie and Laura (schooner) =

Scow schooner sunk in Lake Michigan

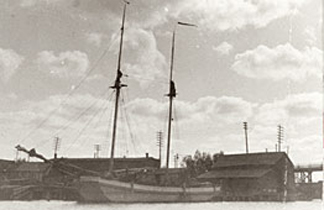
- The Tennie and Laura at Dock

History

United States
- Name: Tennie and Laura
- Builder: Gunder Jorgenson
- Completed: 1876
- Fate: Sunk in storm nine miles southeast of Port Washington, Wisconsin in 1903

General characteristics
- Class & type: Scow Schooner - Freighter
- Tonnage: 56.69 gross
- Length: 73 ft (22 m)
- Beam: 19 ft (5.8 m)
- Height: 5 ft (1.5 m)
- Crew: 2
- Notes: Wood construction
- Tennie and Laura
- U.S. National Register of Historic Places
- Location: Nine miles to the southeast of Port Washington
- Nearest city: Port Washington, Wisconsin
- NRHP reference No.: 08000288
- Added to NRHP: April 11, 2008

The Tennie and Laura was a 73-foot scow-schooner built in 1876 by Gunder Jorgenson in Manitowoc, Wisconsin. It was used as a freighter from the time it was built until the time it sank.

== Service history ==
The Tennie and Laura was registered at Milwaukee, Wisconsin on July 14, 1876. The first owners of the ship were Otto A. Bjorkgnist and Ole Osmondson. Osmondson served as the first captain. Osmondson and Bjorkgnist owned the Tennie and Laura for nine years. On April 5, 1885, Osmondson bought Bjorgnist's share of the Tennie and Laura and then sold the ship to Lars Hansen and Rasmus Hansen. Lars Hansen sold his share to Hans Hansen later that year. The Tennie and Laura was registered again at Milwaukee on January 21, 1886, with Rasmus Hansen serving as ship's master. in 1887, Hans Hansen sold his share to Ingebret Larsen of Sheboygan and Larsen became the ship's master. In winter of 1887, Larsen and Rasmus Hansen sold the Tennie and Laura to Lancaster S. Ludwig and Herman M. Ludwig of Ludington, Michigan. The Ludwig brothers operated the ship until winter of 1889, when Herman Ludwig bought his brother's share. Herman Ludwig was captain until May, 1897, when he sold half the ship to Captain Vasco Roberts for $200. In 1899, Herman Ludwig bought back Captain Roberts' share of the ship and moved to Benton Harbor, Michigan. In 1900, Herman Ludwig sold the Tennie and Laura to his brother, Lancaster Ludwig. On August 20, 1901, Lancaster Ludwig sold the ship to John Sather of Muskegon, Michigan for approximately $1000. Captain Sather used the Tennie and Laura to transport lumber from Muskegon to Milwaukee weekly.

== The final voyage ==
On August 2, 1903, the Tennie and Laura was sailing from Muskegon, Michigan to Milwaukee, Wisconsin, carrying a cargo of lumber worth roughly $500 at the time. The ship was crewed by two men, Captain John Sather and First Mate Charles Morbeck. About nine miles from Port Washington, Wisconsin, the Tennie and Laura was caught in a storm. The ship eventually capsized, and Mate Morbeck died. Captain Sather survived long enough to be rescued by the steamer Covell. At the time of the accident, the ship was valued at $500.

== Discovery and the Tennie and Laura today ==
The wreck of the Tennie and Laura was accidentally discovered in 1999 when a salvage team went in search of the missing fishing boat, Linda E. From surface to deck, it lies under 300 ft. (91m) of water. In 2008, the Tennie and Laura was listed on the National Register of Historic Places.
