= SS R. G. Stewart =

Commercial packet steamer that sank in Lake Superior

Coordinates: 46.87336°N 90.475023°W

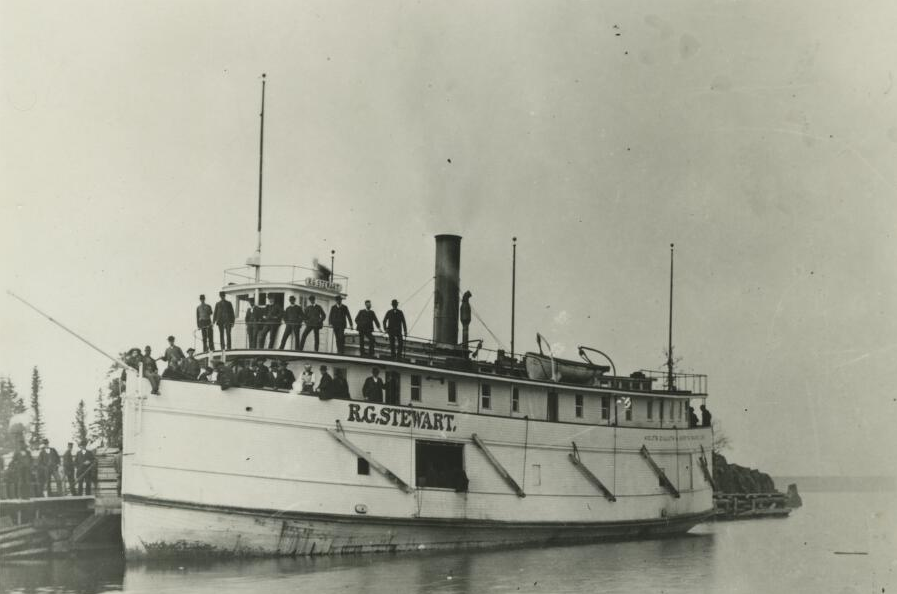
- The R.G. Stewart at an unknown port

History
- Name: R.G. Stewart
- Owner: Cornelius "Con" Flynn
- Operator: Captain Cornelius "Con" Flynn
- Port of registry: United States
- Ordered: 1876
- Laid down: 1877
- Launched: 1878
- Christened: 1878
- Maiden voyage: 1879
- Fate: ran aground and burned near Michigan Island
- Notes: Added to the National Register of Historic Places in 1991

General characteristics
- Type: Packet steamer
- Tonnage: 197 gross tonnage
- Length: 100 feet (30 m) long, 23 feet (7 m) wide
- Notes: Built in Buffalo, New York, in 1878

The R.G. Stewart was a commercial packet steamer. On June 4, 1899, it caught fire and sank in Lake Superior, off the coast of Michigan Island in Chequamegon Bay. The site of the wreck was added to the National Register of Historic Places in 1991.

== History ==
The R.G. Stewart was built in Buffalo, New York, in 1878. It was originally used as a ferry on the Niagara River. The ship was brought to Duluth, Minnesota in 1882 and purchased by Captain Cornelius "Con" Flynn in 1894. Flynn used the ship to carry passengers and cargo to various ports along the south shore of Lake Superior, and had a very profitable business for several years.

On Saturday, June 3, 1899, Flynn left Hancock, Michigan with three passengers and his crew. The cargo included some live cattle. After stopping in Ontonagon, Michigan, The R.G. Stewart was destined for its home port of Duluth. A heavy fog soon developed, making visibility very poor. At 11:00 pm, running blind, the ship suddenly crashed aground on Michigan Island. All efforts to free the ship failed, and the crew decided to wait until morning to deal with the problem.

The next morning, the crew watched for other passing boats who could have helped, but no boats were sighted, and Captain Flynn decided to deal with the problem himself. The engines were started, and he pushed them feverishly in hopes of backing the boat off its standing point. Unfortunately, this caused the boilers to overheat, and the ship was set on fire. With the whole ship severely ablaze, the cattle were pushed overboard to save them. The cattle successfully swam to shore.

Several of the crew and passengers used the lifeboat, while some swam to shore. All survived, except for a crew member named George McKenna, who drowned. The eleven survivors were found by the keeper of the Michigan Island Light, who offered them food and shelter for the night. The following morning he took them to the mainland in his boat.

== See also ==
- Apostle Islands
- List of shipwrecks of the United States
