= SS Ohio (1875) =

Wooden steamship wrecked in Lake Huron in 1894

Coordinates: 45.513134°N 83.503663°W

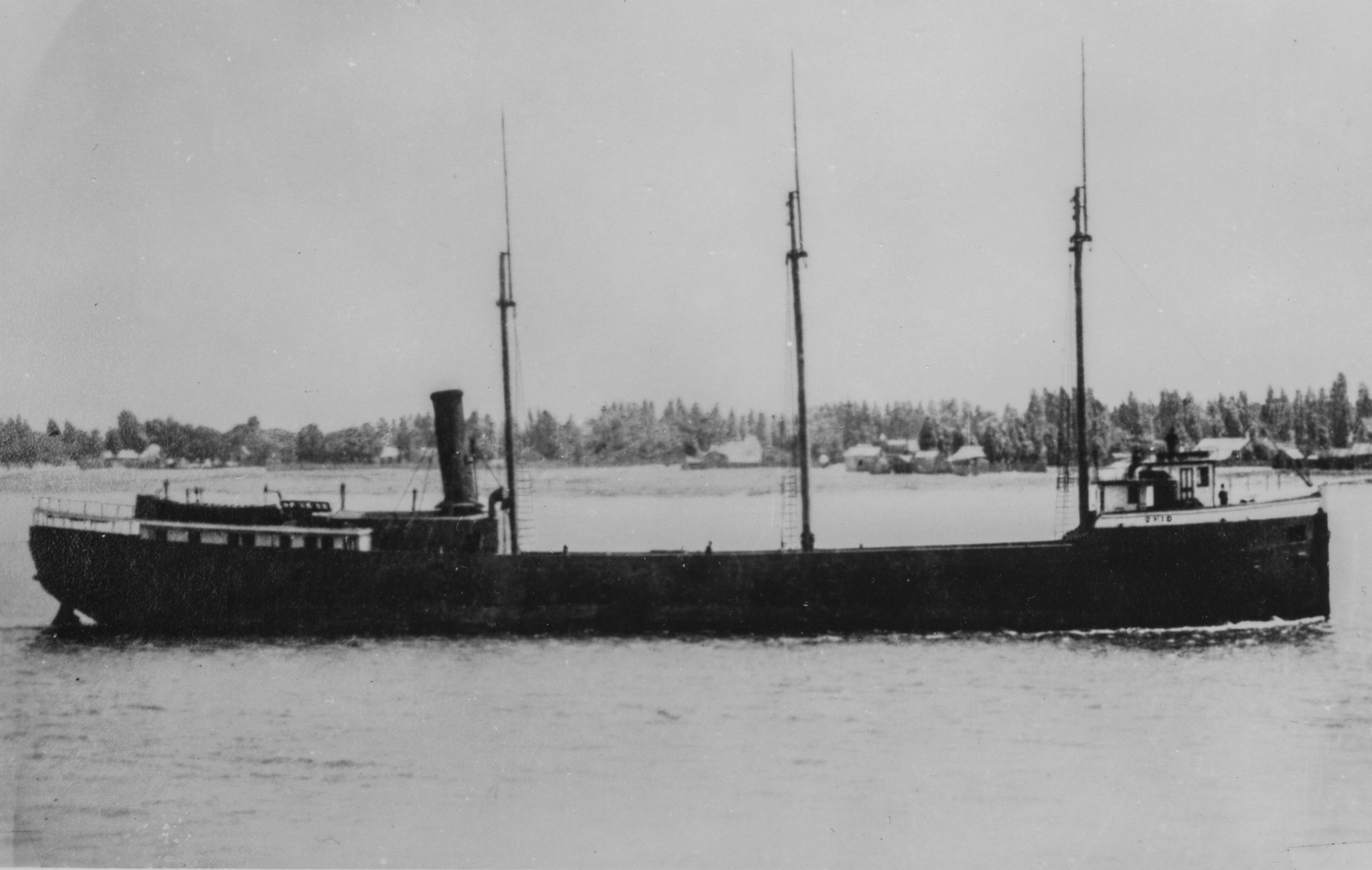
- Ohio prior to her sinking

History

United States
- Name: Ohio
- Namesake: Ohio
- Operator: C.W. Elphicke
- Port of registry: United States
- Builder: John F. Squires of Huron, Ohio
- Yard number: 30
- Launched: April 1875
- Completed: 1875
- In service: May 29, 1875
- Out of service: September 26, 1894
- Identification: U.S. Registry #19438
- Fate: Struck by the schooner Ironton, and sank on Lake Huron

General characteristics
- Class & type: Lake freighter
- Tonnage: 1,101.81 GRT; 850 NRT
- Length: 202.2 feet (61.6 m)
- Beam: 35 feet (11 m)
- Depth: 18.50 feet (5.64 m)
- Installed power: 1 × Scotch marine boiler
- Propulsion: Low pressure condensing engine
- Crew: 16

SS Ohio was a wooden hulled Great Lakes freighter that served on the Great Lakes of North America from her construction in 1875, to her sinking in September 1894 when she collided with the schooner barge Ironton which also sank in the collision. Ironton was being towed by the steamer Charles J. Kershaw, which was also towing the schooner Moonlight. Ohio was found upright in 2017, over 122 years after her sinking in over 200 feet of water off Presque Isle, Michigan. In March, 2023, it was announced that Ironton had been located in 2019. The researchers who discovered Ohio plan to nominate her for a listing in the National Register of Historic Places.

== History ==
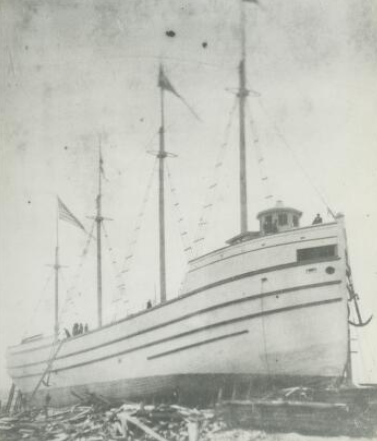
Construction of Ohio

Ohio (Official number 19438) was an early wooden bulk carrier. She was built in 1875 by Ohio resident John F. Squires of Huron, Ohio. She was launched in April of 1875. Her hull was 202.2 feet (61.6 m) long, her beam was 35 feet (11 m) wide and her cargo hold was 18.50 feet (5.64 m) deep. She had a gross tonnage of 1101.81 tons and a net tonnage of 850.82 tons. She was powered by a low pressure condensing engine which was fueled by a single coal-burning Scotch marine boiler. She was used to haul bulk cargoes across the lakes such as iron ore, coal and grain.

== Final voyage and sinking ==
In September 1894 Ohio departed Duluth, Minnesota with a cargo of grain bound for Ogdensburg, New York. This journey took Ohio across Lake Superior, through the Soo Locks into Lake Huron, and past Presque Isle and Thunder Bay, Michigan. While on the Lake Huron leg of her journey Ohio encountered heavy weather.

The steamer Charles J. Kershaw was towing two schooner barges, Moonlight and Ironton. The three vessels were sailing north in rough weather when they saw Ohio which was also sailing through rough weather about 10 miles (16 km) north of Presque Isle. At the moment when the ships were about to pass each other, the hawser connecting Ironton and Moonlight snapped causing Ironton to veer off course and smash into the side of Ohio. Both Ohio and Ironton sank in about half an hour. All sixteen crew members from Ohio got into lifeboats and were picked up by Moonlight. Ohio's First Mate was found clinging to a ladder and was later picked up by the Kershaw. The passing steamer Charles Hebard picked up two of Ironton's crew but five of the schooner's crew perished including Captain Peter Girard.

== Discovery ==
On May 23, 2017, researchers from the Thunder Bay National Marine Sanctuary discovered two shipwrecks deep within the waters of Lake Huron, off the coast of Presque Isle, Michigan. The researchers carried out several investigations between June and August; these investigations confirmed the identities of the steel-hulled steamer Choctaw and Ohio. Choctaw was lost on July 11, 1915 when she collided with the package freighter Wahcondah.

Since the Thunder Bay National Marine Sanctuary did not announce the discovery of Choctaw and Ohio until September 1, 2017, avocational shipwreck hunters continued to search for Choctaw through the summer. While searching for Choctaw, independent researchers Dan Fountain and Kurt Fosburg found Ohio on July 15, 2017, using a modified fishfinder. On July 30 Fountain returned to the site with veteran shipwreck hunters Ken Merryman and Jerry Eliason to image the wreck with Eliason’s homemade hi-definition drop video system, positively identifying the wreck as Ohio.

"These remarkable discoveries remind us that the mystery is still out there – there are still shipwrecks to find. Our team is excited to further document Ohio and Choctaw, and tell their stories. We’ll keep looking for other wrecks and working to ensure that these treasures are preserved for future generations."

— Jeff Gray, the Thunder Bay National Marine Sanctuary's superintendent.

"Ohio and Choctaw are remarkable examples of two very significant Great Lakes watercraft, and both are beautifully preserved. Virtually all of their rigging and deck hardware is intact, and there is clear evidence of the accidents that claimed both vessels. Talk about keeping history alive!"

— Charles Patrick Labadie, a maritime historian.

"These discoveries are a valuable addition to our Great Lakes maritime history. Even at their great depth, non-divers and divers alike can learn more about the shipwrecks’ stories through sanctuary efforts to document and preserve the sites."

— Steve Kroll, sanctuary Advisory Council member.

== Ohio today ==
The wreck of Ohio lies completely preserved in nearly 300 feet of cold fresh water. She sits upright with a list to starboard with her foremast still standing. Her wooden pilothouse with its double helm wheel is completely intact. Near the stern, the mizzen mast is still standing with its topmast broken off. The researchers who discovered her plan to nominate her for a listing in the National Register of Historic Places.
