= Moonlight (ship) =

Schooner that sank in Lake Superior

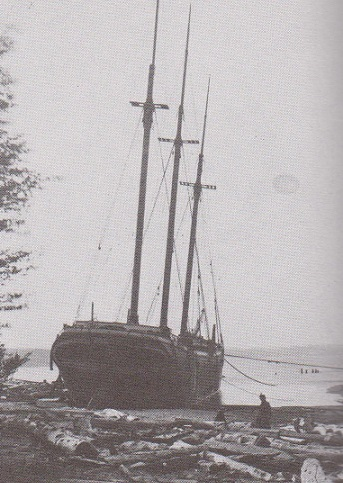
- The Moonlight, ashore near Marquette, Michigan.

History
- Name: Moonlight
- Owner: William Mack (first owner) Joseph C. Gilchrest Company (second owner)
- Port of registry: United States
- Builder: Wolf and Davidson Company
- Laid down: September 13, 1903
- Launched: 1874
- Fate: Shipwrecked on September 13, 1903
- Notes: Added to the National Register of Historic Places in 1991 Location: 46°49.939′N 90°22.703′W

General characteristics
- Type: Schooner, later converted to a tow barge
- Tonnage: 777 gross tons (738 net tons)
- Length: 206 feet (63 m) long, 35 feet (11 m) wide

The Moonlight was a schooner that sank in Lake Superior off the coast of Michigan Island. The wreckage site was added to the National Register of Historic Places in 2008.

== Construction and early career ==
Moonlight was built by the Wolf & Davidson shipyard in Milwaukee for a group of Milwaukee investors led by David Vance. She was launched on March 14, 1874, before a crowd of more than 400 spectators. The three-masted wooden schooner measured approximately 206 feet (63 m) in length, with a beam of 33 feet 6 inches (10.2 m) and a depth of hold of 14 feet 2 inches (4.3 m). She had a gross tonnage of approximately 777 tons and was designed to carry about 50,000 bushels of grain. Captain Denis Sullivan was given command of the new vessel.

During her early career, Moonlight operated primarily in the bulk freight trade between ports on Lakes Michigan and Erie. During her first season in 1874, she carried wheat from Milwaukee to Buffalo and returned with coal. Under Captain Denis Sullivan, she became known across the Great Lakes for her speed and appearance. In addition to her service on the Great Lakes, Moonlight also saw service on the Atlantic Ocean.

== Racing career ==
In 1880, Captain Denis Sullivan agreed to race Moonlight against the schooner Porter from Milwaukee to Buffalo and back. On the return voyage toward Milwaukee, the vessels encountered a violent storm. Sullivan took Moonlight into Port Washington for shelter, while Porter continued toward Milwaukee, where a sudden squall dismasted her. Although Moonlight lost the race, the contest became part of Great Lakes sailing lore and was commemorated in the sailors' song “The Crack Schooner Moonlight.”

A decade later, Moonlight again competed in a schooner race, this time against the Annie M. Peterson from Cleveland to Milwaukee. Despite the Peterson's reputation as the “Race-horse of the Great Lakes,” Moonlight won by a narrow margin.

== Accidents ==
=== 1881 Cleveland Harbor accident ===
On October 4, 1881, Moonlight was badly damaged while entering the harbor at Cleveland during strong northeasterly winds. After striking the harbor piers, the schooner became entangled with the Jeremiah Godfrey, which was moored nearby. As Moonlight repeatedly struck the pier, her starboard quarter was damaged, and much of her headgear was carried away, including her bowsprit and jibboom. Part of her foremast also fell, damaging the cutwater, figurehead, and stem. Contemporary reports estimated that repairs would cost approximately $3,000.

The accident subsequently became the subject of federal admiralty litigation. The court found Moonlight at fault for attempting to enter the harbor under the prevailing conditions without adequate assistance, but also found Jeremiah Godfrey at fault for remaining improperly positioned and for failing to slack her lines promptly after the vessels became entangled. Because both vessels contributed to the accident, the court ordered the damages divided between them.

=== 1889 season ===
On April 20, 1889 she ran aground near the Beaver Islands in northern Lake Michigan, and only two days later, was involved in a collision with barges. On August 23, while in tow of the steambarge Ballentine, Moonlight grounded on a rock shoal below the Nebish. The vessel also experienced several changes in command during the season; Captain George Case took command in early September, while by November, Captain Laferty was in command. While at Erie, Laferty's recently hired crew deserted the vessel, claiming that they feared mistreatment once Moonlight left port. Laferty had the men arrested, and the dispute was ultimately settled when they reimbursed the cost of their transportation from Cleveland.

=== 1894 Ohio and Ironton disaster ===
On September 26, 1894, Moonlight and the schooner-barge Ironton were being towed northward across Lake Huron by the steamer Charles J. Kershaw, bound for Marquette, Michigan. When Kershaw suffered an engine failure several miles north of Presque Isle, strong winds pushed the schooner-barges toward the disabled steamer. To avoid a collision and entanglement, the crew of Moonlight cut Ironton's tow line.

After becoming detached, Ironton attempted to regain control but veered into the path of the southbound steamer Ohio. The two vessels collided and both subsequently sank. Ohios crew escaped in lifeboats, and sixteen members of the crew were picked up by Moonlight. Five members of Irontons crew were lost in the disaster.

=== 1895 stranding and sale ===
On September 29, 1895, Moonlight and the schooner H. A. Kent were being towed by the steambarge Charles J. Kershaw toward Marquette when a steam pipe aboard Kershaw broke during heavy weather. The vessels were driven ashore, and their crews were rescued by the lifesaving service. Kershaw was badly damaged, while Moonlight and Kent remained stranded on the beach.

Efforts to release the two schooners continued through the remainder of the year. By December, four attempts had been made to free Moonlight and Kent, but both remained stranded. They remained at Marquette through the winter and were finally pulled from the beach in May 1896.

The following month, Moonlight and Kent were purchased by J. C. Gilchrist. Contemporary reports stated that both vessels would receive a thorough overhaul and would subsequently tow with steamers of the Gilchrist fleet.

=== 1903 sinking ===
On September 13, 1903, Moonlight, then operating as a schooner barge, was carrying approximately 1,400 tons of iron ore from Ashland, Wisconsin, under tow of the steamer Volunteer. The vessels encountered a gale near the Apostle Islands, and as they approached Michigan Island, Moonlight began taking on water. Attempts to operate her steam pumps were unable to keep pace with the flooding, and the vessel began to settle rapidly.

Captain Campbell signaled Volunteer, which maneuvered alongside the sinking barge. The entire crew of Moonlight escaped by jumping aboard Volunteer, and no lives were lost. Moonlight subsequently foundered approximately 12 miles off Michigan Island in Lake Superior. The vessel was insured for $9,000 and her cargo was valued at $6,000.

== Wreck ==
The wreck of Moonlight was discovered in 2004 by shipwreck hunters Ken Merryman and Jerry Eliason near Michigan Island in Lake Superior. It lies in approximately 240 feet (73 m) of water, about seven miles (11 km) east of the island. The vessel likely broke apart near the surface as it sank, with sections of the hull separating before reaching the lakebed. Large portions of the wooden hull nevertheless survive, along with machinery and numerous artifacts, including the donkey boiler and engine, steam-powered windlass, anchors, ceramics, bottles, rudder, and the ship's wheel and steering mechanism. The vessel's name remains visible on one of its anchors.

The wreck's remote location and depth have limited diver visitation, leaving much of the site relatively undisturbed. The Wisconsin Historical Society considers the wreck archaeologically significant for the information it preserves about the construction of large wooden Great Lakes schooners and shipboard life during the late nineteenth century. The Moonlight shipwreck was listed on the Wisconsin State Register of Historic Places on April 18, 2008, and on the National Register of Historic Places on October 1, 2008.
