= Success (disambiguation) =

Success is the achievement of a desired result.

Success may also refer to:

== Places ==
=== United States ===
- Success, Arkansas, United States
- Success, Kansas, United States
- Success, Michigan, ghost town
- Success, Mississippi, United States
- Success, Missouri, United States
- Success, New Hampshire, United States
- Success, Ohio, United States
- Success Dam, across the Tule River, California, United States
- Success Glacier, in the U.S. state of Washington
- Success Lake, man-made lake in New Jersey, United States
- Success Lake (Connecticut), reservoir in Connecticut, United States
- Success Pond, in the U.S. state of New Hampshire

=== Elsewhere ===
- Success, Western Australia, a suburb of Perth, Western Australia
- Success, Saskatchewan, Canada
- Success Bank, a shallow sea bank off Fremantle, Western Australia
- Success Hill railway station, in Perth, Western Australia
- Success Park 'n' Ride, a bus station in Perth, Western Australia

== Media and entertainment ==
=== Film and television ===
- Success (1923 film), a silent drama film
- Success (1984 film), a 1984 Soviet film
- Success (1991 film), a 1991 German film
- Success (2003 film), a 2003 Indian film

=== Literature ===
- Success (novel), a 1978 novel by Martin Amis
- Success (magazine), a business magazine in the United States
- "Success is Counted Sweetest", a poem by Emily Dickinson published under the title "Success"

=== Music ===
- "Success" (Loretta Lynn song), from the 1962 album Loretta Lynn Sings
- Success (The Weather Girls album), and the title song
- Success (The Posies album), 1998
- "Success" (Sigue Sigue Sputnik song), 1988
- "Success" (Dannii Minogue song), 1991
- "Success", a song by Iggy Pop from his 1977 album Lust for Life
- "Success", a song by Jay-Z from his 2007 album American Gangster

=== Video games ===
- Success Mode, the main story mode and character creation method in the Power Pros baseball video game series

== Organizations ==
- Success Academy (disambiguation)
- Success Automobile Manufacturing Company, a defunct auto company in St. Louis, Missouri, United States
- Success University, Dallas, Texas
- Success (company), a computer game developer and publisher
- S.U.C.C.E.S.S., a Chinese Canadian organization headquartered in Vancouver

== Ships ==
- HMS Success, various Royal Navy ships
- HMAS Success, two Royal Australian Navy ships
- USS Success, two US Navy vessels
- Success (prison ship), an Australian prison hulk and museum ship, 1840–1946
- Success (shipwreck), shipwreck off the coast of Whitefish Dunes State Park in Sevastopol, Wisconsin

== People ==
- Success Eduan (born 2004), British sprinter
- Isaac Success (born 1996), Nigerian footballer

== See also ==
- Toyota Succeed, a station wagon
- "Successful" (song), a 2009 song by Canadian rapper Drake
- "Successful" (Ariana Grande song), from the album Sweetener (2018)
- Succession (disambiguation)
- Successor (disambiguation)
