= SS Australasia =

Defunct wooden-hulled American Great Lakes freighter

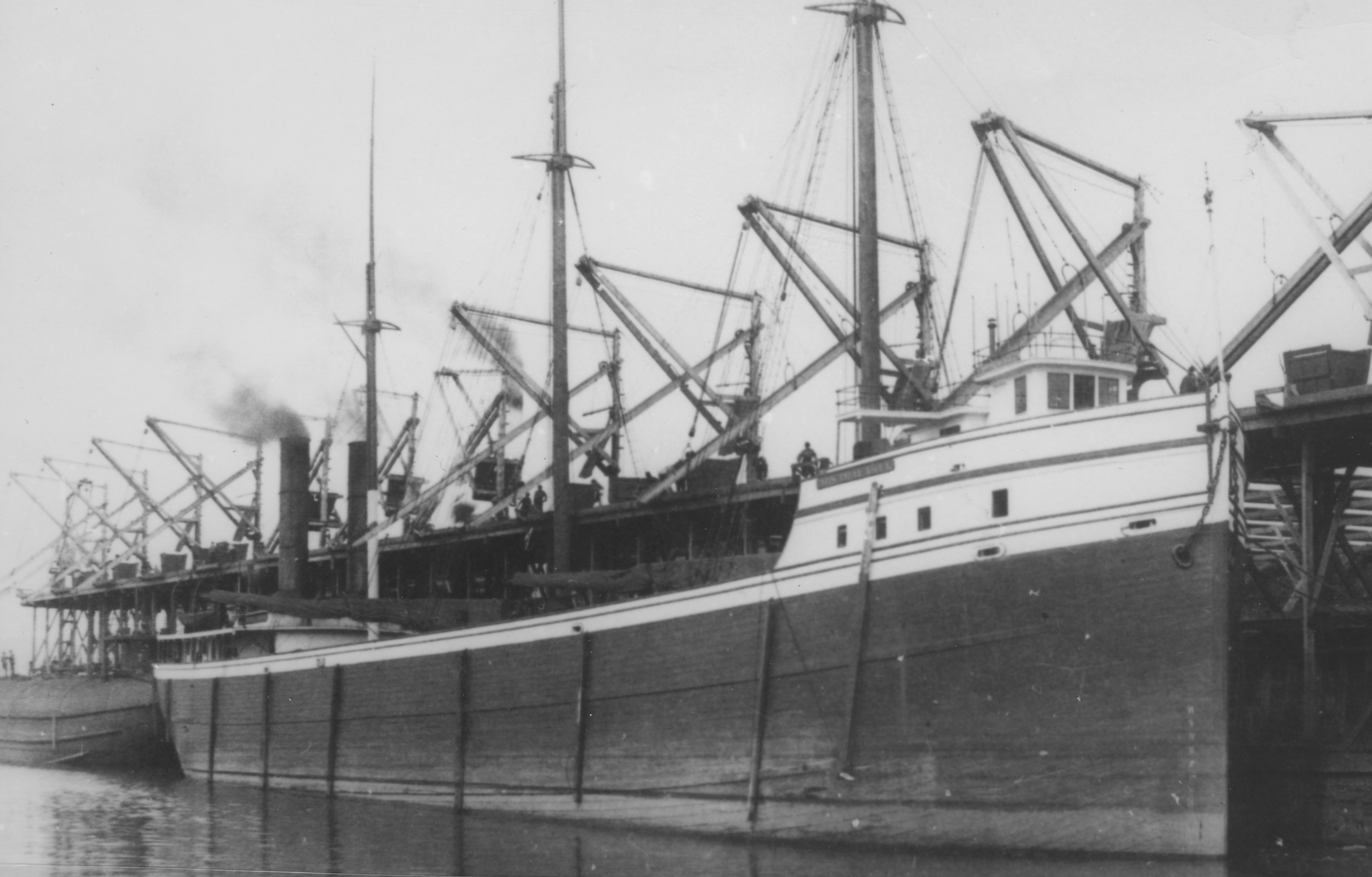
- The Australasia prior to her sinking

History

United States
- Name: Australasia
- Operator: Davidson Steamship Company 1884–1886; James Corrigan and John Huntington (1/2 each) 1886–1893; Corrigan Transit Company 1893–1896
- Port of registry: United States
- Builder: James Davidson
- Yard number: 9
- Launched: September 17, 1884
- In service: 1884
- Out of service: October 18, 1896
- Identification: U.S. Registry #106302
- Fate: Burned to a total loss on Lake Michigan

General characteristics
- Type: Bulk Freighter
- Tonnage: 1,829.32 GRT; 1,539.20 NRT
- Length: 285 ft (87 m)
- Beam: 39 ft (12 m)
- Height: 21.2 ft (6.5 m)
- Installed power: 2 × Scotch marine boilers
- Propulsion: fore-and-aft compound engine

National Register of Historic Places data
AUSTRALASIA (wooden bulk carrier) Shipwreck
U.S. National Register of Historic Places
Location within Wisconsin Location within the United States
Location	Door County, Wisconsin
Nearest city	Sevastopol, Wisconsin
Coordinates	44°55.20′N 87°11.13′W
Built	1884 in West Bay City, Michigan
Architect	James Davidson
Architectural style	Freighter
MPS	Great Lakes Shipwreck Sites of Wisconsin MPS
NRHP reference No.	13000466
Added to NRHP	July 3, 2013

Australasia was a wooden-hulled American Great Lakes freighter that served on the Great Lakes of North America between her construction in 1884 to her burning and sinking in 1896. On October 18, 1896, while loaded with coal, the Australasia sank in Lake Michigan near the town of Sevastopol, Door County, Wisconsin, United States, after burning off Cana Island. On July 3, 2013, the wreck of the Australasia was added to the National Register of Historic Places.

== History ==
The Australasia (Official number 106302) was built in 1884 in West Bay City, Michigan, by the shipyard owned by Captain James Davidson. She was built for the Davidson Steamship Company, which was also owned by Captain Davidson. At a length of 285 feet (87 m), the Australasia was one of the largest wooden ships ever built; her beam was 39 feet (12 m) wide and her cargo hold was 21.2 feet (6.5 m) deep. She was powered by a fore-and-aft compound engine which was fueled by two coal-burning Scotch marine boilers.

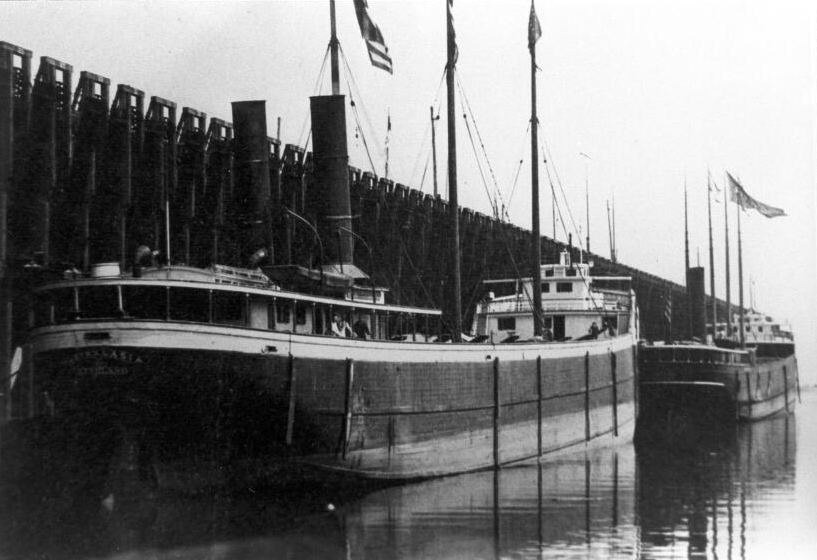
Stern view of the Australasia at an ore dock

She had a gross tonnage of 1829.32 tons and a net tonnage of 1539.20 tons.

On September 17, 1884, the Australasia was launched as hull number #9. At the time of her launch, the Australasia was the largest wooden-hulled ship in the world. Because of her enormous size, the Australasia needed iron cross bracing, an iron keelson, iron plates, and several iron arches to increase her strength. (Note: James Davidson was a well-known builder of wooden ships. While most companies started to build ships with steel hulls, Davidson kept building wooden ships and pushed the boundaries of wooden boat technology. Because of this he eventually manufactured some of the largest wooden ships in the world like: the Appomattox, the Frank O'Connor and the Pretoria)

She was used to haul bulk cargoes such as iron ore, coal, grain and sometimes salt. She could carry these cargoes so efficiently that she earned a fortune for her owners at a time when small, less versatile wooden vessels were quickly being replaced by larger, and stronger iron or steel vessels. Just like all ships owned by Captain Davidson, the Australasia used to tow a wooden schooner barge.

== Final voyage ==
On October 17, 1896, the Australasia was bound from a port on Lake Erie for Milwaukee, Wisconsin, carrying 2,200 tons of soft coal. At around 6:00 p.m. near Baileys Harbor, the crew of the Australasia discovered "a fire beneath the texas on the main deck". They attempted to fight the blaze but failed. The crew abandoned the Australasia before she reached Jacksonport, Wisconsin. At 10:30 p.m., the Australasia was about four hours off Jacksonport when the tugboat John Leathem came upon the struggling steamer. The Leathem began towing the Australasia to shore, but the hawser connecting them kept burning through. At 9:00 a.m. on October 18, 1896, the crew of the Leathem gave up trying to salvage her and instead dragged her onto the beach in 15 feet (4.6 m) of water south of Cave Point. Her crew decided to scuttle her, by ramming a hole in the Australasia's side with the Leathem's stem. She burned until the night of October 18, 1896.

== The Australasia today ==
The Australasia was declared a total loss. Much of her cargo of soft coal and machinery was salvaged; however, her hull was beyond repair and was abandoned. Today her lower hull lies mostly buried in sand under 15 to 20 feet of water off Whitefish Dunes State Park. Because most of her hull remains buried in sand, there is the possibility that different hull sections may be uncovered which may reveal more significant information about her construction. Not a trace of her cargo is visible on the site of her wreck, but traces of coal are visible on a beach nearby. The wreck of the Australasia is rarely visited by divers which means that very little site disturbance to the site has occurred. Close by are the wrecks of several other ships, including the early steel freighter Lakeland, the large wooden bulk carrier Frank O'Connor, the wooden steamer Louisiana, which was lost during the Great Lakes Storm of 1913, the schooner Christina Nilsson and the steamboat Joys.
