= Legal successor =

Legal successor may refer to:

- Legal successor (business), a successor company legally recognized as such
- Legal successor (organization), a successor organization legally declared or recognized as such
- Legal successor (property), a legal inheritor of a property or property rights
- A state that inherited territory and population of another, see succession of states.

== See also ==
- Successor (disambiguation)
- Succession (disambiguation)
- Order of succession
- Category:Succession acts
