= Successor =

Successor may refer to:

- An entity that comes after another (see Succession (disambiguation))

== Film and TV ==
- The Successor (1996 film), a film including Laura Girling
- The Successor (2023 film), a French drama film
- Successor (2024 film), a Chinese comedy drama film
- The Successor (TV program), a 2007 Israeli television program

== Music ==
- Successor (EP), an EP by Sonata Arctica
- Successor (album), an album by Dedekind Cut

== Mathematics ==
- A successor cardinal
- A successor ordinal
- The successor function, the primitive defined as $S(n) = n + 1$
- A successor (graph theory), a node following the current one in a path

== Other ==
- The Successor (novel), a 2003 novel by Ismail Kadare
- The Diadochi, or Successors to Alexander the Great
- Successor (horse), an American Thoroughbred racehorse
- Successor, the working name for the class of British ballistic missile submarines, since renamed the Dreadnought-class
- Khalifa, a Muslim who is considered a political-religious successor to the Islamic prophet Muhammad
- Successor ideology, a niche reactionary concept from the early 2020s
- Spiritual successor, a successor to a work of fiction which does not build upon the storyline established by a previous work
- "The Successor" (short story), 1951 short story by Paul Bowles

== See also ==
- Success (disambiguation)
- Legal successor (disambiguation)
