= Success (shipwreck) =

- SUCCESS (scow schooner) Shipwreck
- U.S. National Register of Historic Places
- Location: Off the coast of Sevastopol, Wisconsin
- NRHP reference No.: 15000711
- Added to NRHP: October 5, 2015

The Success is a shipwreck located off the coast of Whitefish Dunes State Park in Sevastopol, Wisconsin.

== History ==
The Success was built by Norwegian immigrant Julius Johnson in Manitowoc, Wisconsin in 1875. The vessel primarily hauled lumber on Lake Michigan.

On Thanksgiving of 1896, the ship was anchored at Whitefish Bay, Wisconsin in an attempt to wait out a storm. However, it began taking on water and was eventually pushed ashore by a gale. All crew members were rescued and the cargo would be salvaged, but the ship was declared to be a total loss.

The site was added to the State and the National Register of Historic Places in 2015.
