= Succussion =

Succussion may refer to:

- Succussion, a homeopathy preparation procedure
- Succussion splash, a sloshing sound heard through a stethoscope

== See also ==
- Succession (disambiguation)
