= Success rate =

Success rate is the fraction or percentage of success among a number of attempts to perform a procedure or task. It may refer to:

- Call setup success rate
- When success refers to attempts to induce pregnancy, then pregnancy rate is used:
  - Artificial insemination § Success rates
  - In vitro fertilisation § Success rates

== See also ==
- Failure rate
- Rate (disambiguation)
- Success (disambiguation)
