= Whitefish Bay, Door County, Wisconsin =

Whitefish Bay, Wisconsin
- Unincorporated community
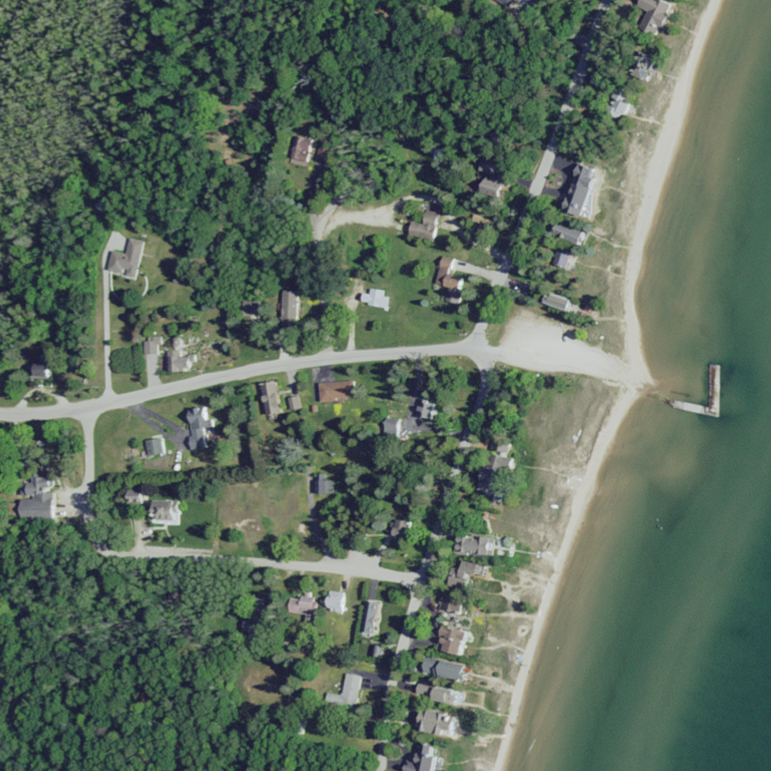
- The Whitefish Bay Boat Launch (center right) is a Sevastopol Town Park with about 120 feet of beach and also a public dock.

- Location within the state of Wisconsin
- Coordinates: 44°54′21″N 87°13′02″W
- Country: United States
- State: Wisconsin
- County: Door
- Town: Sevastopol
- Time zone: UTC-6 (Central (CST))
  - Summer (DST): UTC-5 (CDT)
- Area code: 920
- GNIS feature ID: 1577971

Whitefish Bay is an unincorporated community on the Lake Michigan shoreline in the town of Sevastopol, Door County, Wisconsin, United States. Native Americans, likely the Menominee, called Whitefish Bay Ah-Quas-He-Ma-Ganing ("save our lives").

Glidden Drive stretches along the shore in Whitefish Bay. It is named after a banker from Michigan City, Indiana named Orrin Glidden, and is part of Rustic Road 9. Trails connecting to Glidden Drive stretch across public lands to provide access to Arbter and Schwartz lakes, and the Nature Conservancy operates a parking lot off of Glidden Drive.

In 1893, Joe Mardin purchased 43 acres nearby along Shivering Sands Creek. He built a four-story structure out of wood, especially wood, much of which he found washed ashore. Called Castle Romance, the first story housed pigs, the second, geese, and the fourth, ducks. The third story was intended to lodge summer travelers and had several beds and a piano. In 1913, the first summer cottage along what is now Glidden Drive was built out of wood scrapped from Castle Romance.

Sherman Bay is a small bay about a half mile in size located south of Whitefish Bay and north of Lily Bay.

== Roads ==
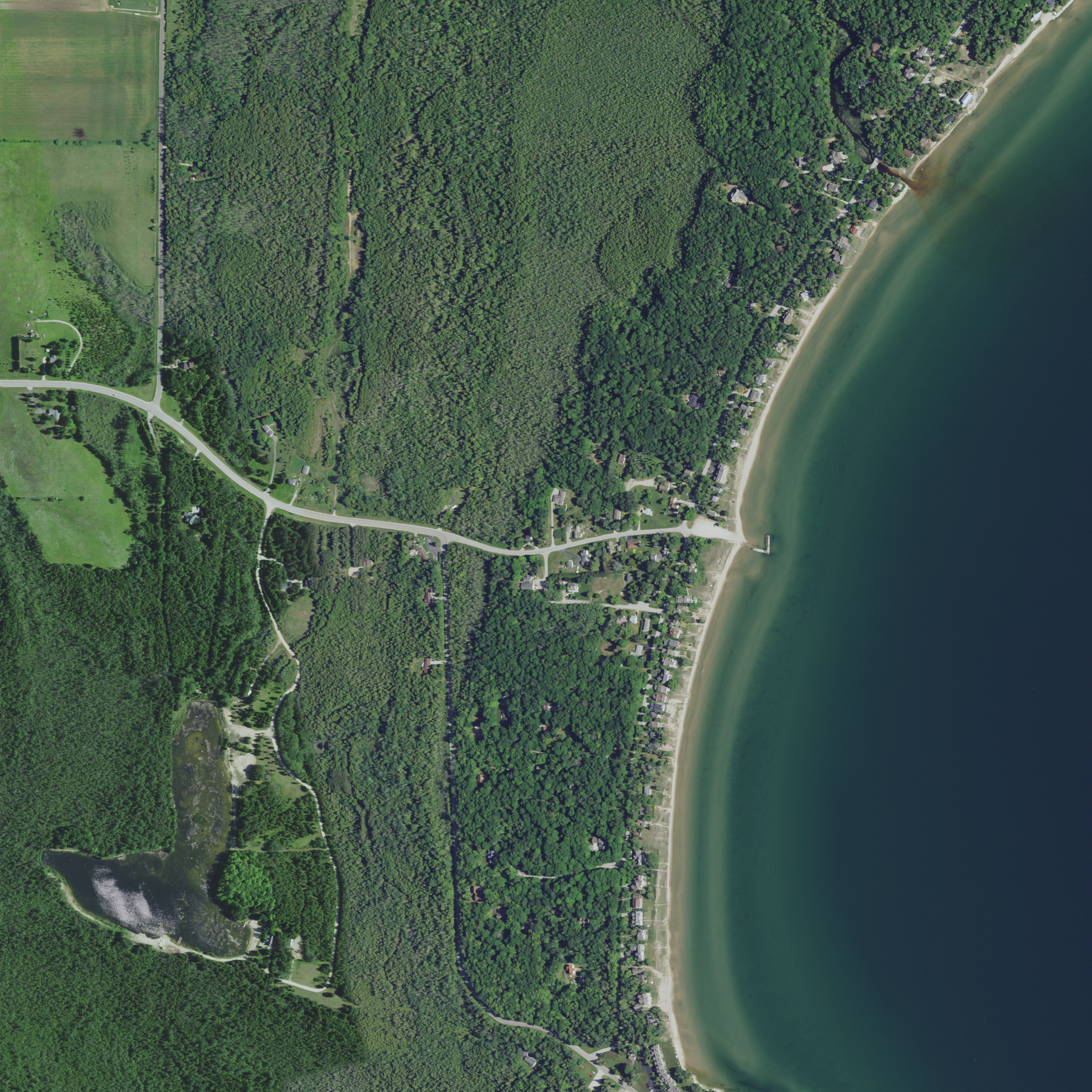
Central part of Whitefish Bay

East Whitefish Bay Road (center) runs east towards Whitefish Bay, making a T intersections with three roads to the south: Lake of the Woods Road (left), Glidden Drive (center), and Moeller Drive (center left). The east end of the road is at Sevastopol Town Park with a beach and dock. Just before reaching the park, East Whitefish Bay Road intersects with Bark Road to the South and South Cave Point Drive to the north. South Cave Point Drive crosses Whitefish Bay Creek just upstream of its mouth (upper right) into Whitefish Bay. Bark Road continues south, ending at a T intersection with Glidden Drive. Glidden Drive extends to the lower border of the photograph at the row of Glidden Lodge Beach Resort condos (right lower border).

=== Northeastern part ===
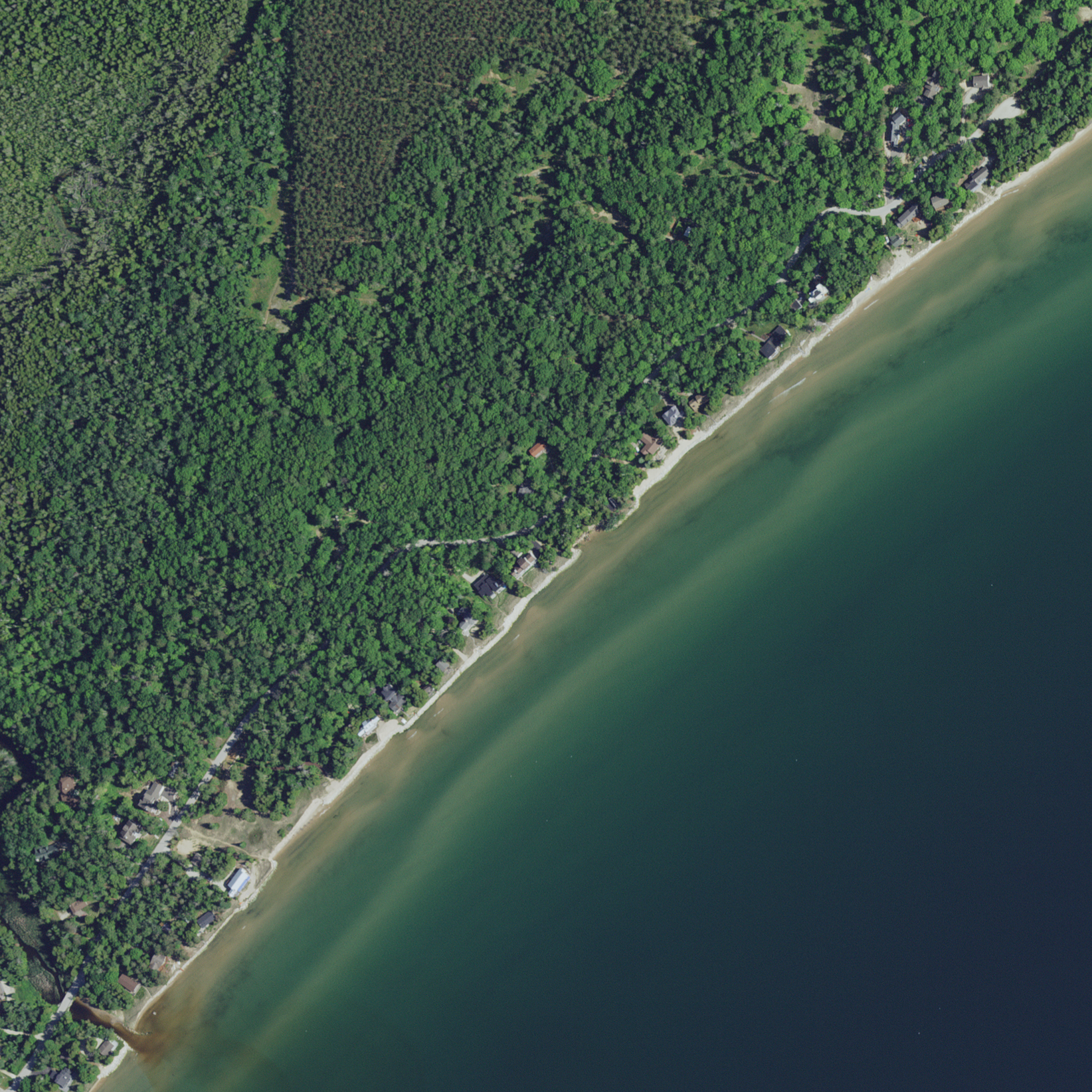
Northeastern Whitefish Bay

South Cave Point Drive extends north after crossing the mouth of Whitefish Bay Creek (lower left), ending at Whitefish Dunes State Park (far right corner; the state park also includes the wooded area set back from the shore on the left)

=== Southern part ===
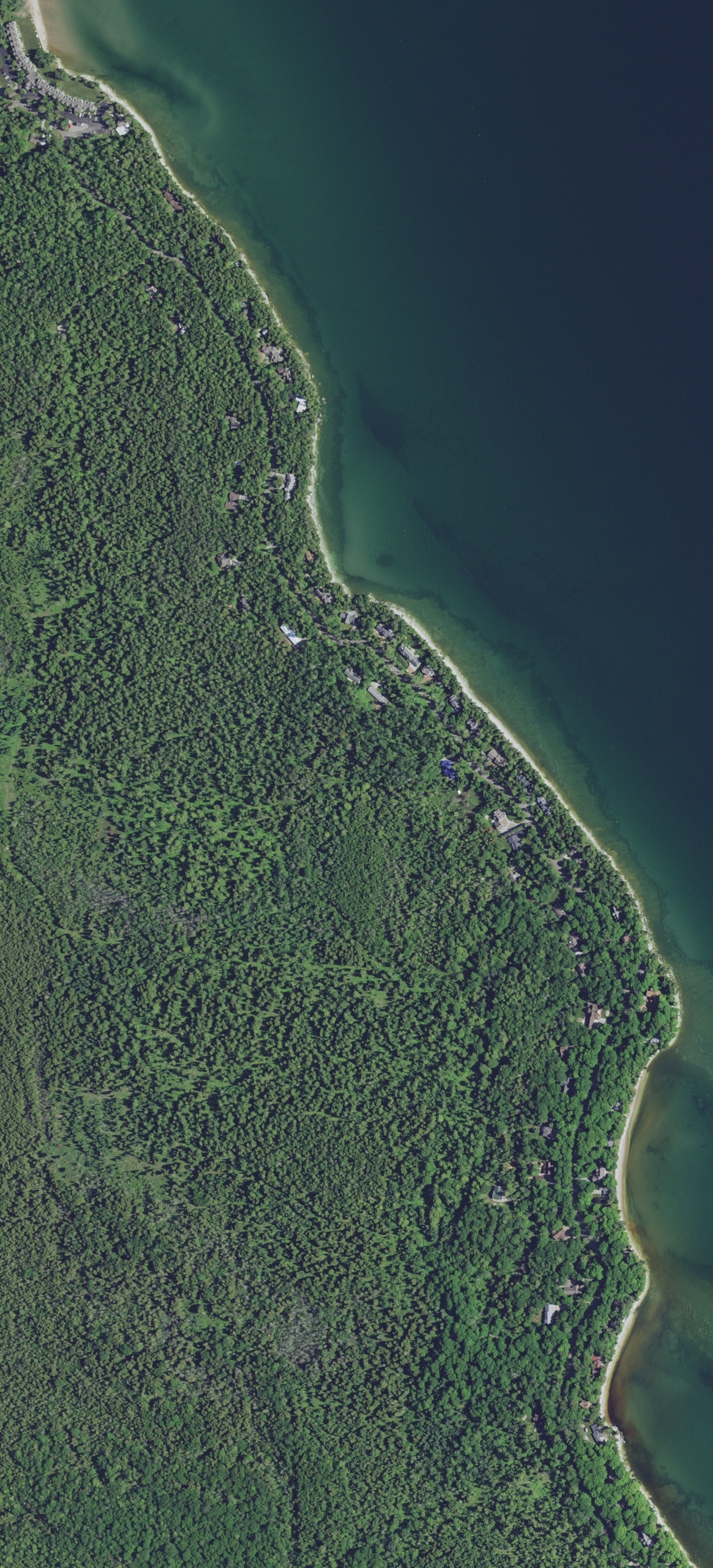
Southern Whitefish Bay

Glidden Drive runs parallel to the shore south of the row of Glidden Lodge Beach Resort condos (upper left corner). Extensive wooded areas both along the drive and set back further to the west are owned by the Nature Conservancy and the Wisconsin Department Natural Resources and are open to the public.

== Climate ==
Whitefish Bay (chart is for the body of water)

Climate chart (precipitation, max. and min. temperature)
J	F	M	A	M	J	J	A	S	O	N	D
57 −2 −7	54 −5 −7	60 0 −2	129 2 −1	93 6 2	85 11 8	97 14 12	78 16 14	87 17 16	129 9 9	85 4 4	65 3 1
- █ Average max. and min. temperatures in °C
- █ Precipitation totals in mm
Imperial conversion
J	F	M	A	M	J	J	A	S	O	N	D
2.2 28 19	2.1 23 19	2.4 32 28	5.1 36 30	3.7 43 36	3.3 52 46	3.8 57 54	3.1 61 57	3.4 63 61	5.1 48 48	3.3 39 39	2.6 37 34
- █ Average max. and min. temperatures in °F
- █ Precipitation totals in inches

== Gallery ==
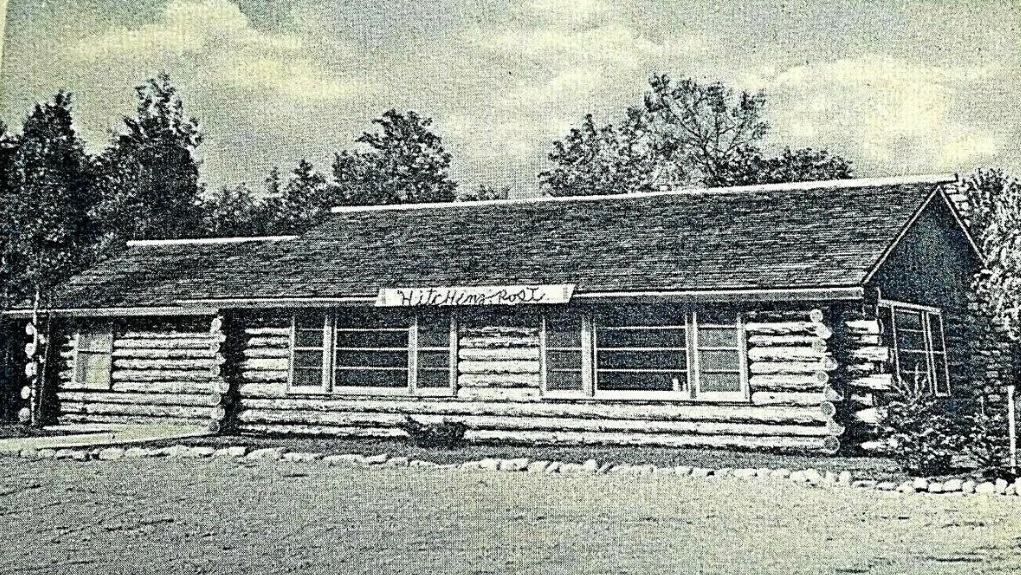
"The Hitching Post" in Whitefish Bay; from a circa 1940s postcard; After Orrin Glidden died in 1933, the Schmock family purchased the resort and later constructed this building as a restaurant. It was managed for a time by their son Tom Schmock.

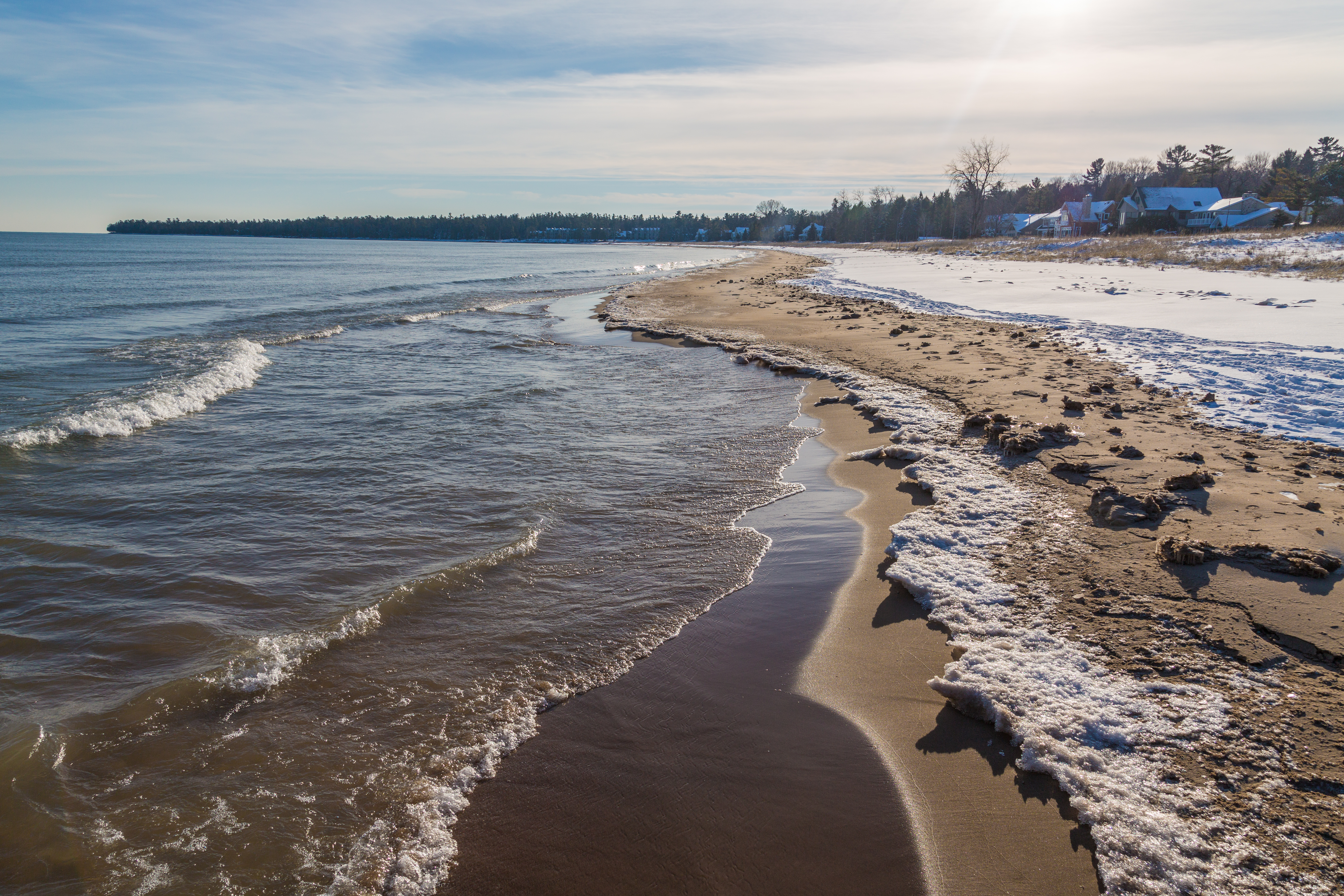
On January 1, 2017

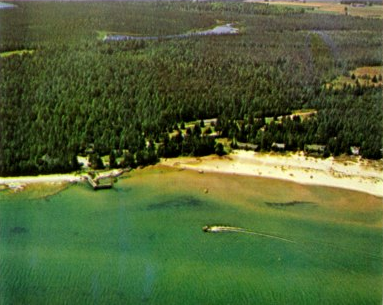
Aerial view of the present-day location of the Glidden Lodge Beach Resort condos and vicinity, published 1963

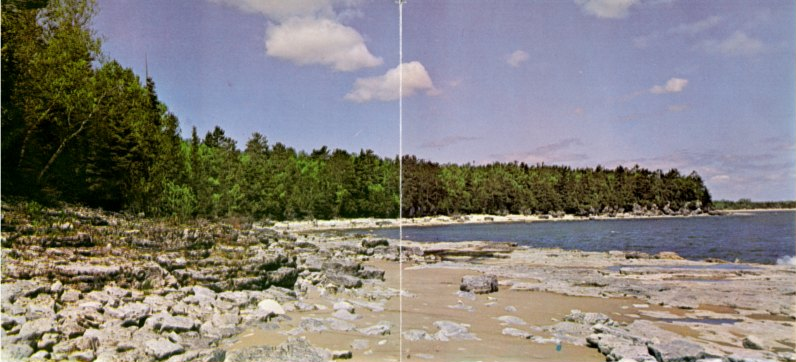
The shore along Glidden Drive prior to development, published 1963

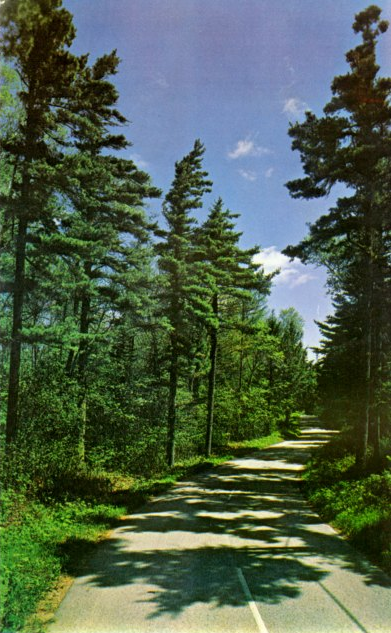
Glidden Drive, published in 1963

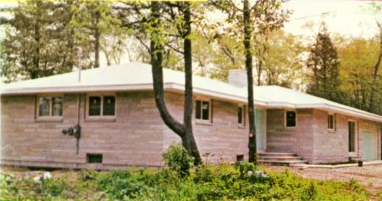
A nearly completed house along Glidden Drive, published 1963

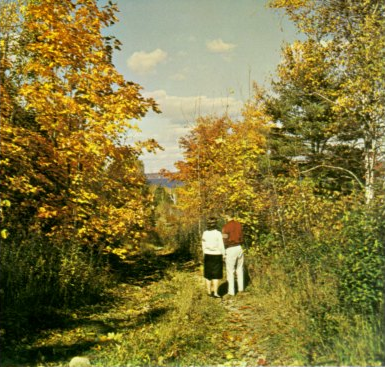
Trail near Glidden Drive, published 1963
