= HMAS Success =

Two ships of the Royal Australian Navy (RAN) have been named HMAS Success.

- HMAS Success (H02), an S-class destroyer launched in 1918, decommissioned in 1931, and sold for scrap
- HMAS Success (OR 304), a Durance-class replenishment oiler launched in 1984, decommissioned in 2019

== Battle honours ==
Ships named HMAS Success are entitled to carry two battle honours:

- Kuwait 1991
- East Timor 1999

== See also ==
- HMS Success, sixteen ships of the Royal Navy
