= Wesley Yang =

American writer

Wesley Yang is an American social-media personality and political commentator. He hosts a blog and podcast called Year Zero.

Yang was born to Korean-American parents who were refugees from the Korean War and was raised in New Jersey. He studied history at Rutgers University.

Yang attracted mainstream attention in 2008 after publishing an article in n+1 about Seung-Hui Cho, the perpetrator of the Virginia Tech shooting. He has since then written extensively about the experiences of Asian-Americans in American society.

Yang published his first book, The Souls of Yellow Folk, in 2018. A collection of his previously published essays, the book was selected as a notable book of the year by The New York Times Book Review and The Washington Post, and one of the best books of the year by The Spectator and Publishers Weekly. Yang coined the term "successor ideology" in 2019 to describe an emerging ideology among left-wing movements in the United States centered around identity politics. Yang opposes this ideology and believes it may replace traditional liberal values.

Yang costarred as Wes in the 2008 Alex Karpovsky docufiction film Woodpecker.
