= Ninth Grade Success Academy =

Ninth Grade Success Academy may refer to a Ninth Grade Success Academy at:

- Waianae High School#Academics, in Hawai'i
- West Philadelphia High School#Small learning communities, in Pennsylvania

== 9th Grade Success Academy ==
- Northeast High School (Philadelphia)#Programs

== See also ==
- Success Academy (disambiguation)
