= HMS Success =

Sixteen ships of the Royal Navy have been named HMS Success, whilst another was planned:

- English ship Success (1650) was a 34-gun ship, previously the French ship Jules. She was captured in 1650, renamed HMS Old Success in 1660 and sold in 1662.
- HMS Success (1660) was a 24-gun ship launched in 1658 as Bradford. She was renamed HMS Success in 1660 and was wrecked in 1680.
- HMS Success (1672) was a 6-gun fireship purchased in 1672 that foundered in 1673.
- HMS Success (1692) was a store hulk purchased in 1692 and sunk as a breakwater in 1707.
- HMS Success (1709 sloop) was a 10-gun sloop purchased in 1709 that the French captured in 1710 off Lisbon.
- HMS Success (1709 storeship) was a 24-gun storeship launched in 1709, hulked in 1730, and sold in 1748.
- HMS Success (1712) was a 20-gun sixth rate launched in 1712, converted to a fireship in 1739, and sold in 1743.
- HMS Success (1736) was a 14-gun sloop launched in 1736; her fate is unknown.
- HMS Success (1740) was a 24-gun sixth rate launched in 1740 and broken up in 1779.
- HMS Success (1754) was a 14-gun ketch launched in 1754. Her fate is unknown.
- HMS Success (1781) was a 32-gun fifth rate launched in 1781 that the French captured in 1801 but that the British recaptured the same year. She became a convict ship in 1814 and was broken up in 1820.
- HMS Success (1797) was a 3-gun gunvessel, previously in use as a barge. She was purchased in 1797 and sold in 1801 for £100.
- HMS Success (1825) was a 28 gun sixth rate launched in 1825, and captained by James Stirling in his journey to Western Australia. She was used for harbour service from 1832 and was broken up 1849.
- HMS Success was to have been a wood screw sloop. She was ordered but not laid down and was cancelled in 1863.
- HMS Success (1901) was a B-class destroyer launched in 1901 and wrecked in 1914.
- HMS Success was an S-class destroyer launched in 1918. She was transferred to the Royal Australian Navy in 1919 and was sold in 1937.
- HMS Success (G26) was an S-class destroyer launched in 1943. She was transferred to the Royal Norwegian Navy later that year and renamed HNoMS Stord. She was broken up in 1959.

== See also ==
- HMAS Success, two ships of the Royal Australian Navy.
