= Sevastopol, Wisconsin =

- Town
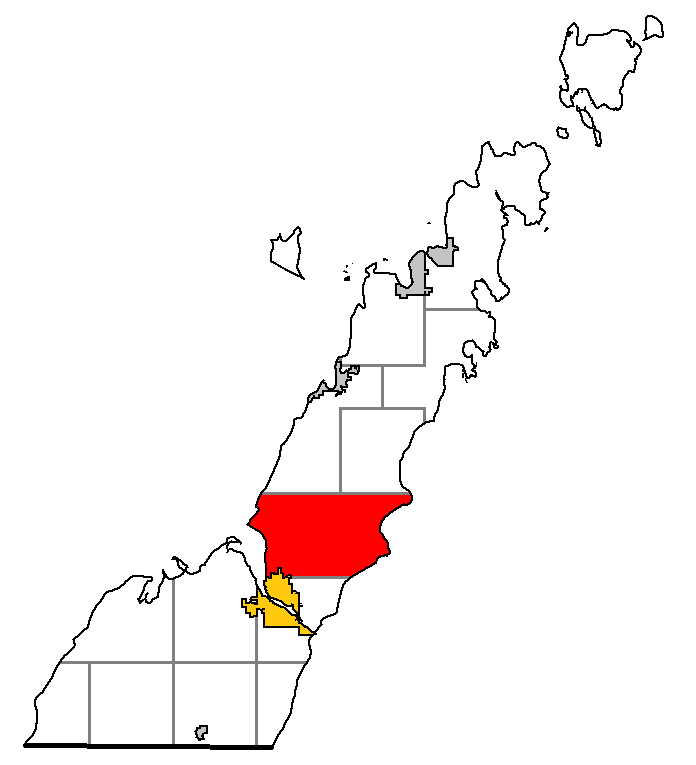
- Location of Sevastopol, within Door County
- Coordinates: 44°53′28″N 87°18′1″W
- Country: United States
- State: Wisconsin
- County: Door

Area
  - Total: 90.6 sq mi (234.6 km^{2})
  - Land: 51.9 sq mi (134.3 km^{2})
  - Water: 38.7 sq mi (100.3 km^{2})
- Elevation: 590 ft (180 m)

Population (2020)
  - Total: 2,826
  - Density: 54.50/sq mi (21.04/km^{2})
- Time zone: UTC-6 (Central (CST))
  - Summer (DST): UTC-5 (CDT)
- Area code: 920
- FIPS code: 55-72600
- GNIS feature ID: 1584125
- Website: Official website

Sevastopol (/səˈvæstəpoʊl/ sə-VASS-tə-pohl) is a town in Door County, Wisconsin, United States. The population was 2,826 at the 2020 census.

== Communities ==
- Institute is an unincorporated community mainly along WIS 57 at County Road P’s eastern terminus. Containing the current town hall for the town, Institute was named for a Roman Catholic boarding school that once stood there.
- Little Harbor is a small unincorporated community along County Road B at the harbor of the same name.
- Valmy (/ˈvælmi/ VAL-mee) is an unincorporated community mainly centered around the intersection of WIS 57 and County Road T. The community serves as a gateway to the nearby Whitefish Dunes State Park as well as Cave Point County Park.
- Whitefish Bay is an unincorporated community located at the intersection of County Road T and Whitefish Bay Road.

== Geography ==
According to the United States Census Bureau, the town has a total area of 90.6 square miles (234.6 km^{2}), of which 51.8 square miles (134.3 km^{2}) is land and 38.7 square miles (100.3 km^{2}) (42.75%) is water.

== Demographics ==
As of the census of 2000, there were 2,667 people, 1,076 households, and 825 families residing in the town. The population density was 51.4 people per square mile (19.9/km^{2}). There were 1,554 housing units at an average density of 30.0 per square mile (11.6/km^{2}). The racial makeup of the town was 98.09% White, 0.04% African American, 0.30% Native American, 0.19% Asian, 0.75% from other races, and 0.64% from two or more races. Hispanic or Latino of any race were 1.35% of the population.

There were 1,076 households, out of which 27.2% had children under the age of 18 living with them, 68.5% were married couples living together, 4.6% had a female householder with no husband present, and 23.3% were non-families. 19.7% of all households were made up of individuals, and 9.2% had someone living alone who was 65 years of age or older. The average household size was 2.48 and the average family size was 2.84.

In the town, the population was spread out, with 22.8% under the age of 18, 4.9% from 18 to 24, 25.4% from 25 to 44, 29.8% from 45 to 64, and 17.1% who were 65 years of age or older. The median age was 43 years. For every 100 females, there were 102.2 males. For every 100 females age 18 and over, there were 101.7 males.

The median income for a household in the town was $47,227, and the median income for a family was $52,125. Males had a median income of $33,152 versus $22,632 for females. The per capita income for the town was $24,150. About 5.9% of families and 7.3% of the population were below the poverty line, including 13.0% of those under age 18 and 6.0% of those age 65 or over.

== Climate ==
Cave Point County Park

Climate chart (precipitation, max. and min. temperature)
J	F	M	A	M	J	J	A	S	O	N	D
57 −2 −7	54 −5 −7	60 0 −2	129 2 −1	93 6 2	85 11 8	97 14 12	78 16 14	87 17 16	129 9 9	85 4 4	65 3 1
- █ Average max. and min. temperatures in °C
- █ Precipitation totals in mm
Imperial conversion
J	F	M	A	M	J	J	A	S	O	N	D
2.2 28 19	2.1 23 19	2.4 32 28	5.1 36 30	3.7 43 36	3.3 52 46	3.8 57 54	3.1 61 57	3.4 63 61	5.1 48 48	3.3 39 39	2.6 37 34
- █ Average max. and min. temperatures in °F
- █ Precipitation totals in inches

== Plant collections ==
=== Potatoes ===
The U.S. Potato Genebank at the Peninsular Research Station just north of Sturgeon Bay is the world's second largest living collection of wild potatoes with 65 wild species in 2010. Altogether in 2010 it held 5,277 total collections, the fifth highest number of total collections worldwide and accounting for a little over 5% of the total worldwide. During fiscal year 2019, 10,042 samples from the collection were distributed to academics and businesses with 6,659 distributed domestically and 3,383 exported to other nations. Grapes, orchard trees, and field crops are also grown at the research station.

=== Garden plants ===
A master gardeners association operates a one-acre botanical garden on the Peninsular Research Station grounds with about 350 varieties of plants.

== Gallery ==
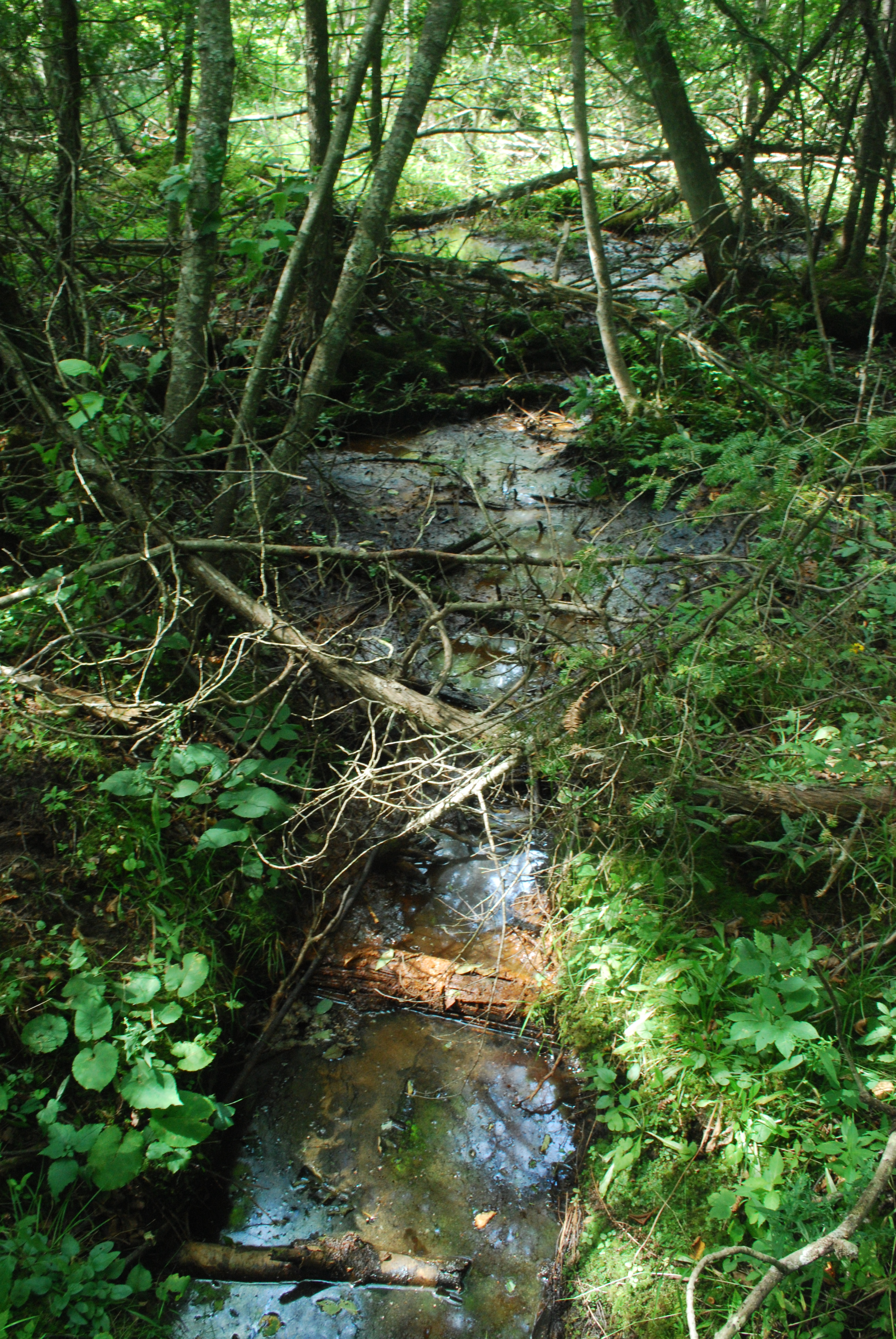
Stream at the Shivering Sands Preserve

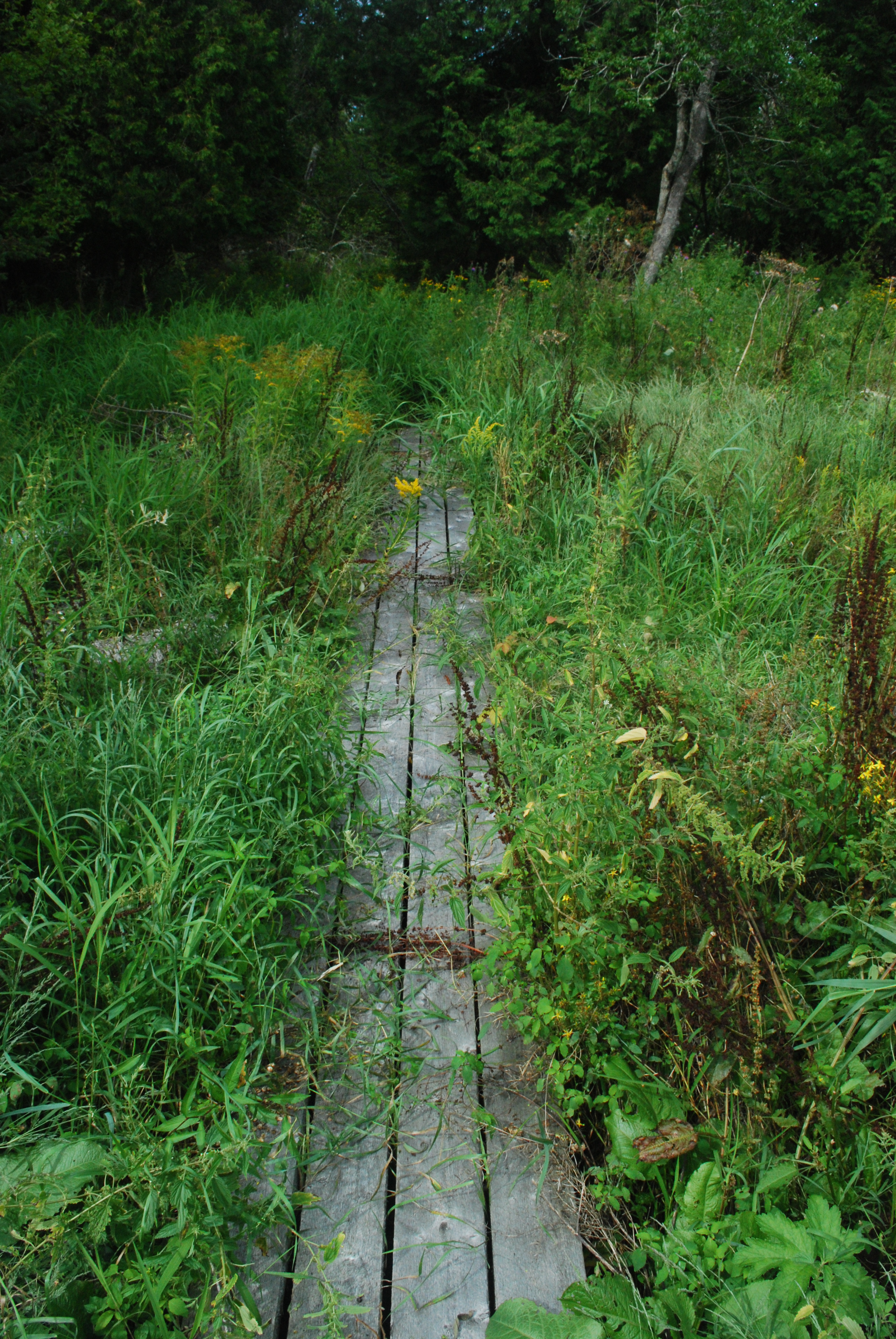
Boardwalk at the Shivering Sands Preserve

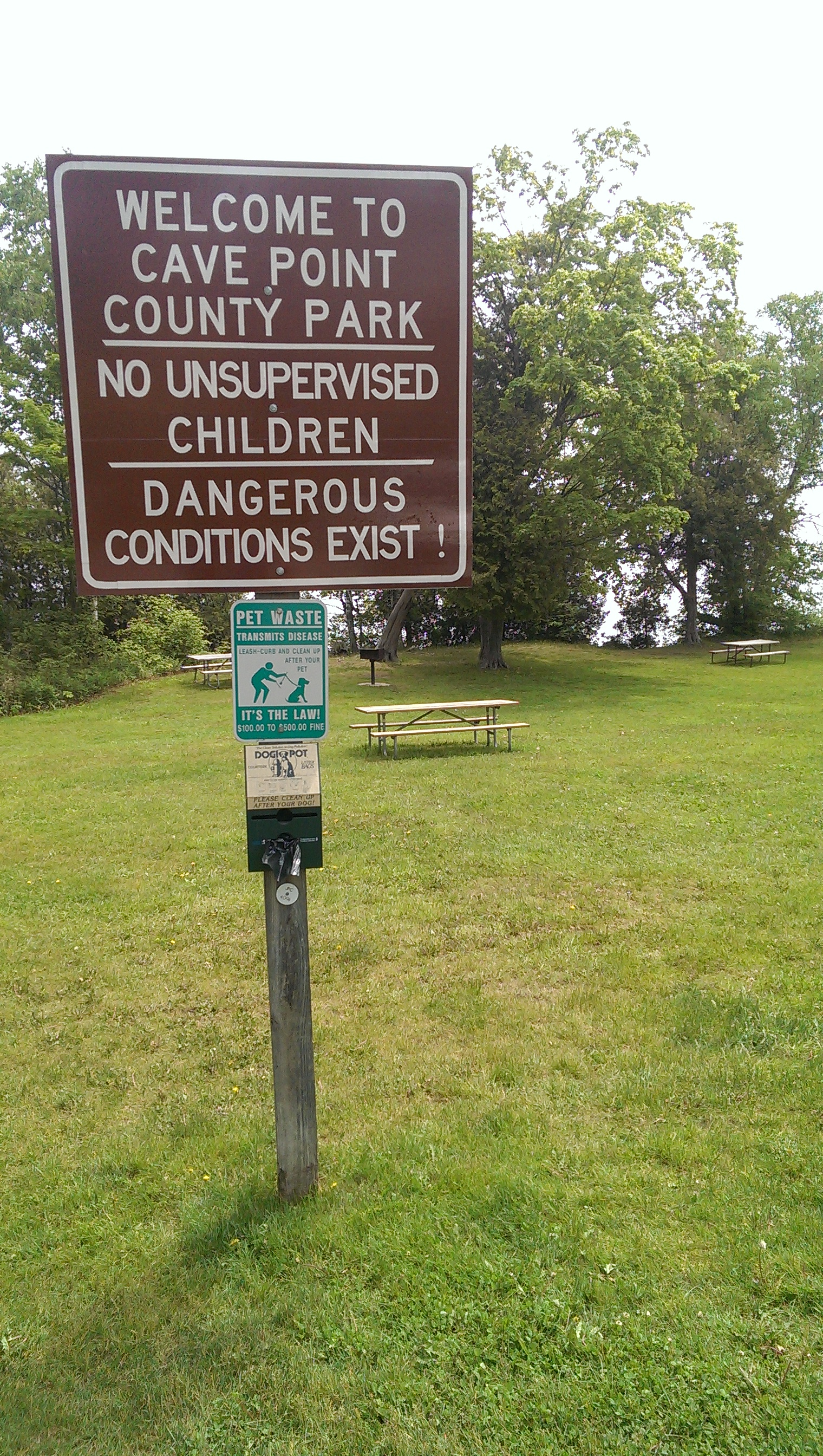
Cave Point County Park

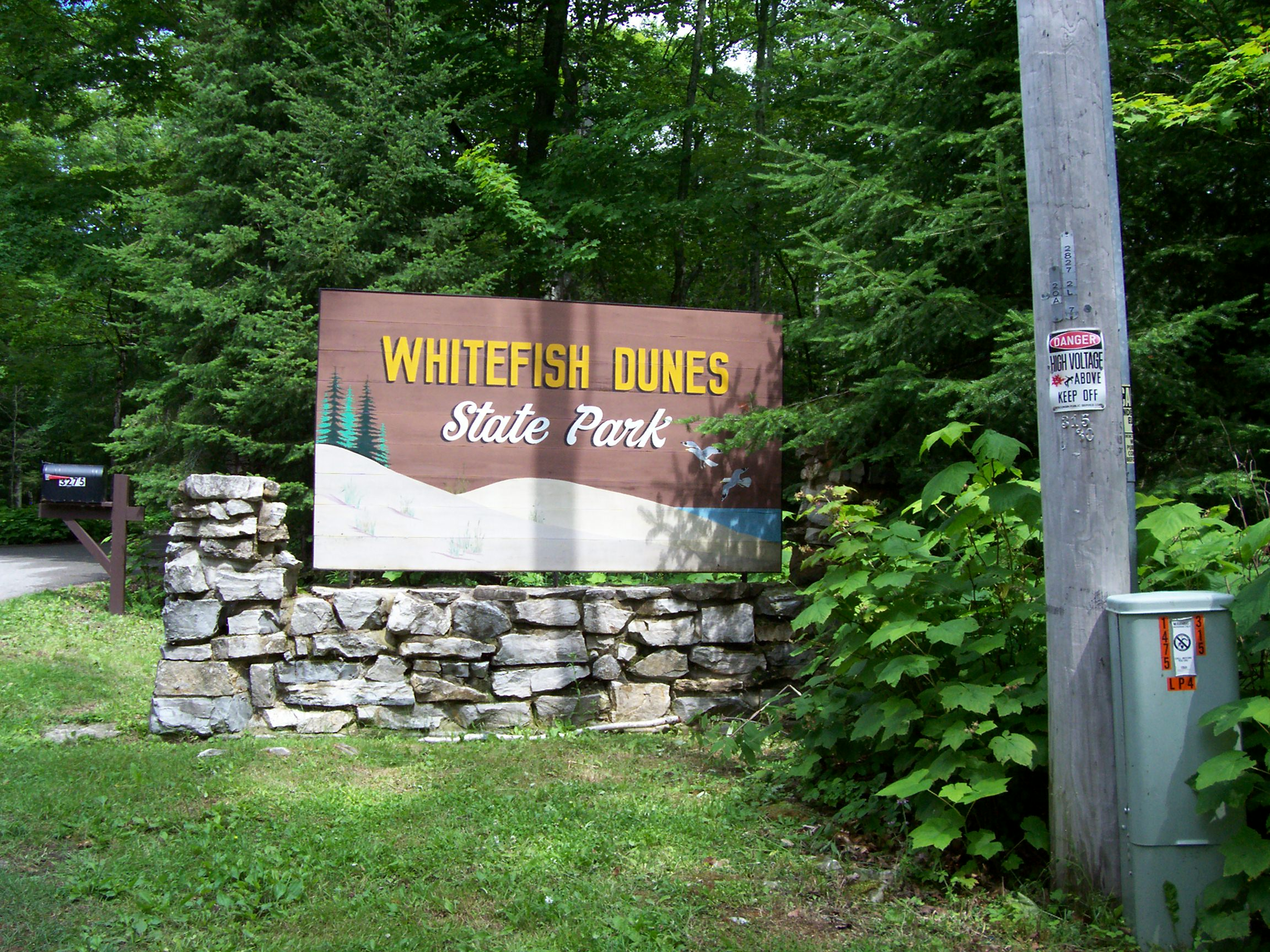
Whitefish Dunes State Park

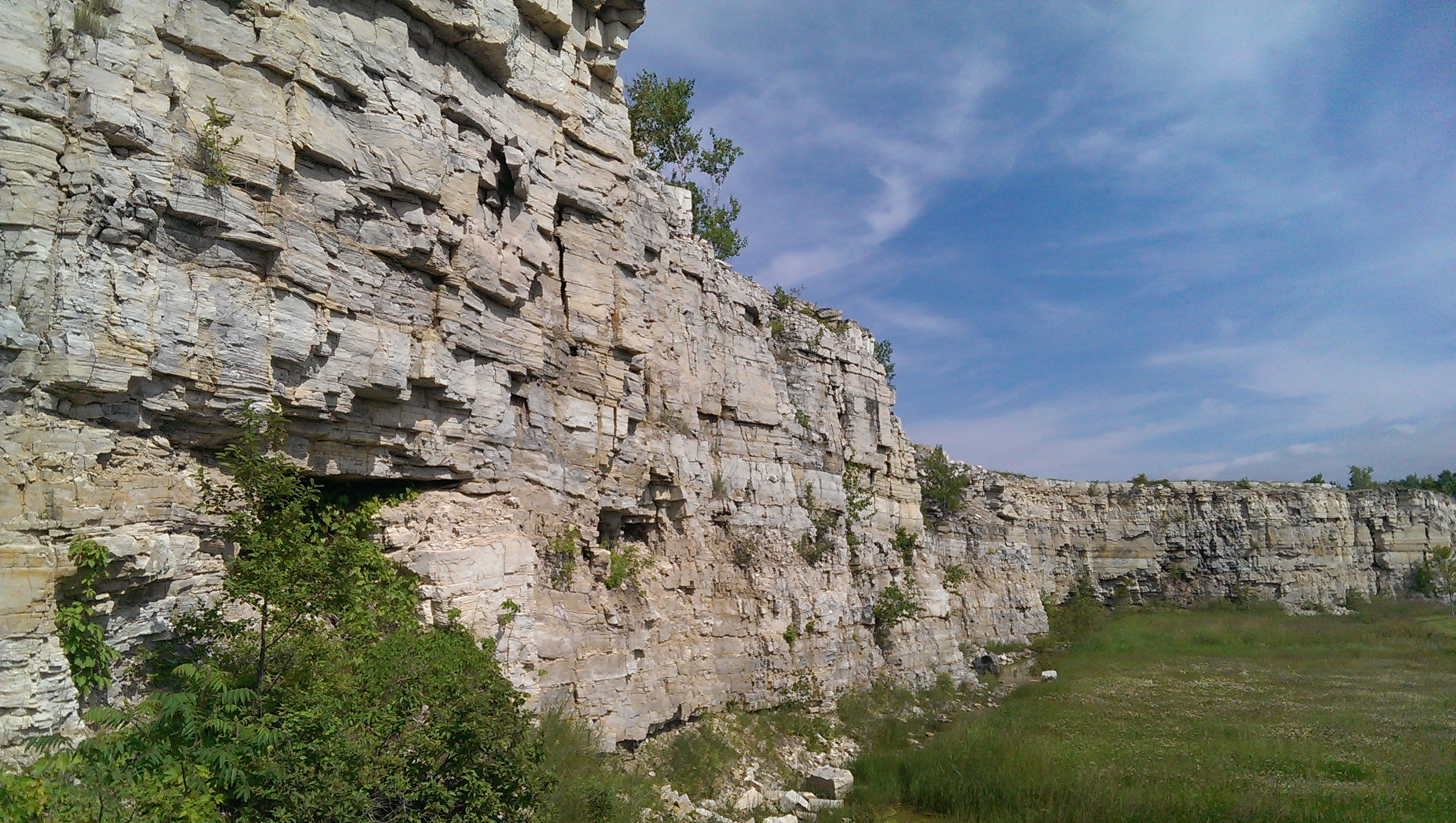
Rock cut at the Old Stone Quarry, now George K. Pinney County Park

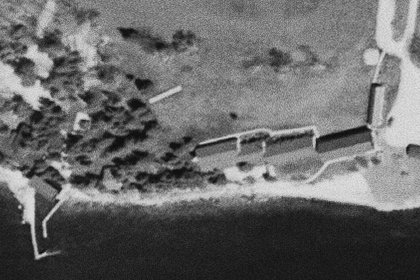
The now-defunct Chateau Hutter resort in 1955

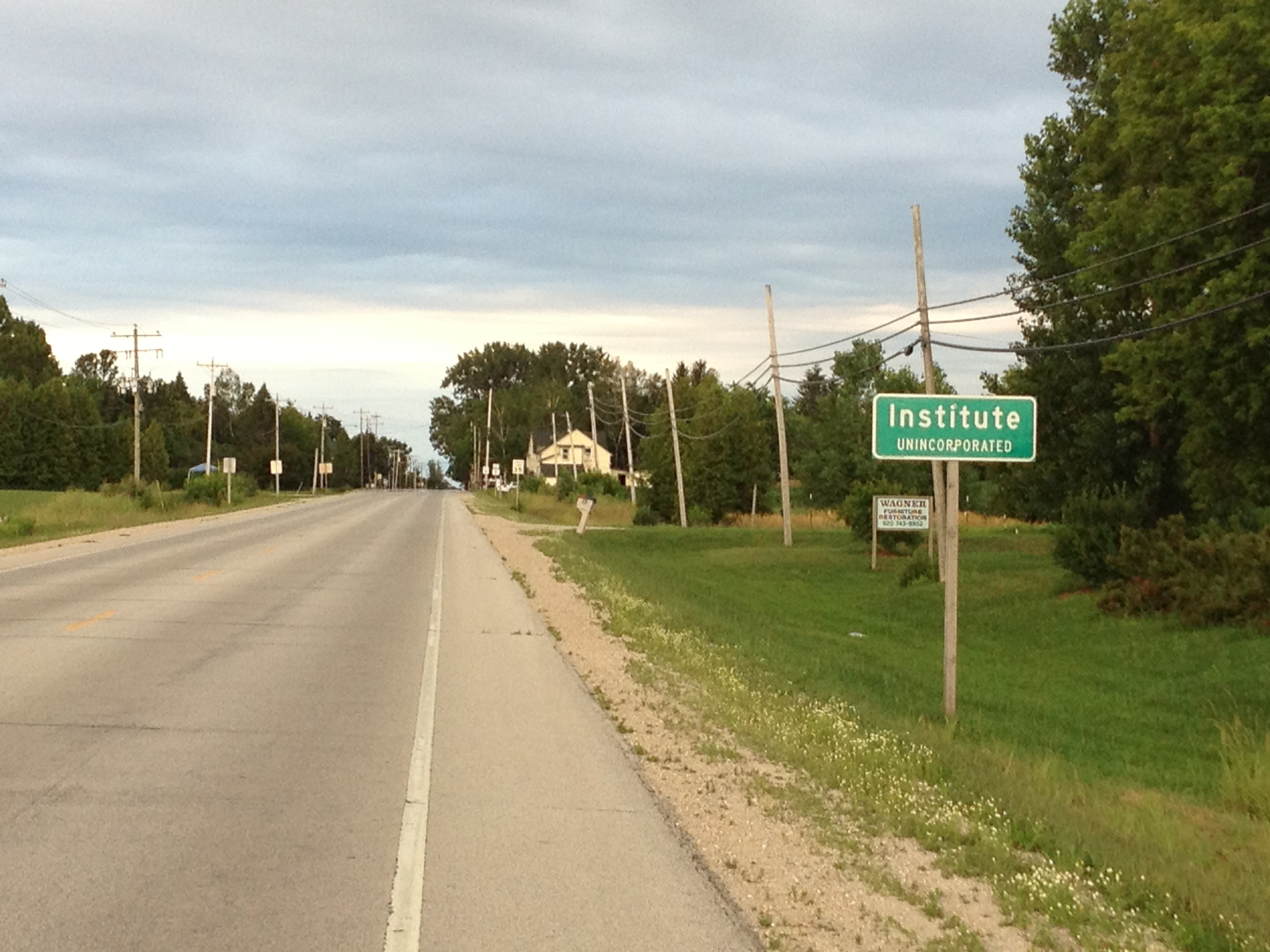
Institute, Wisconsin, 2013, Wisconsin Highway 57, looking south toward town

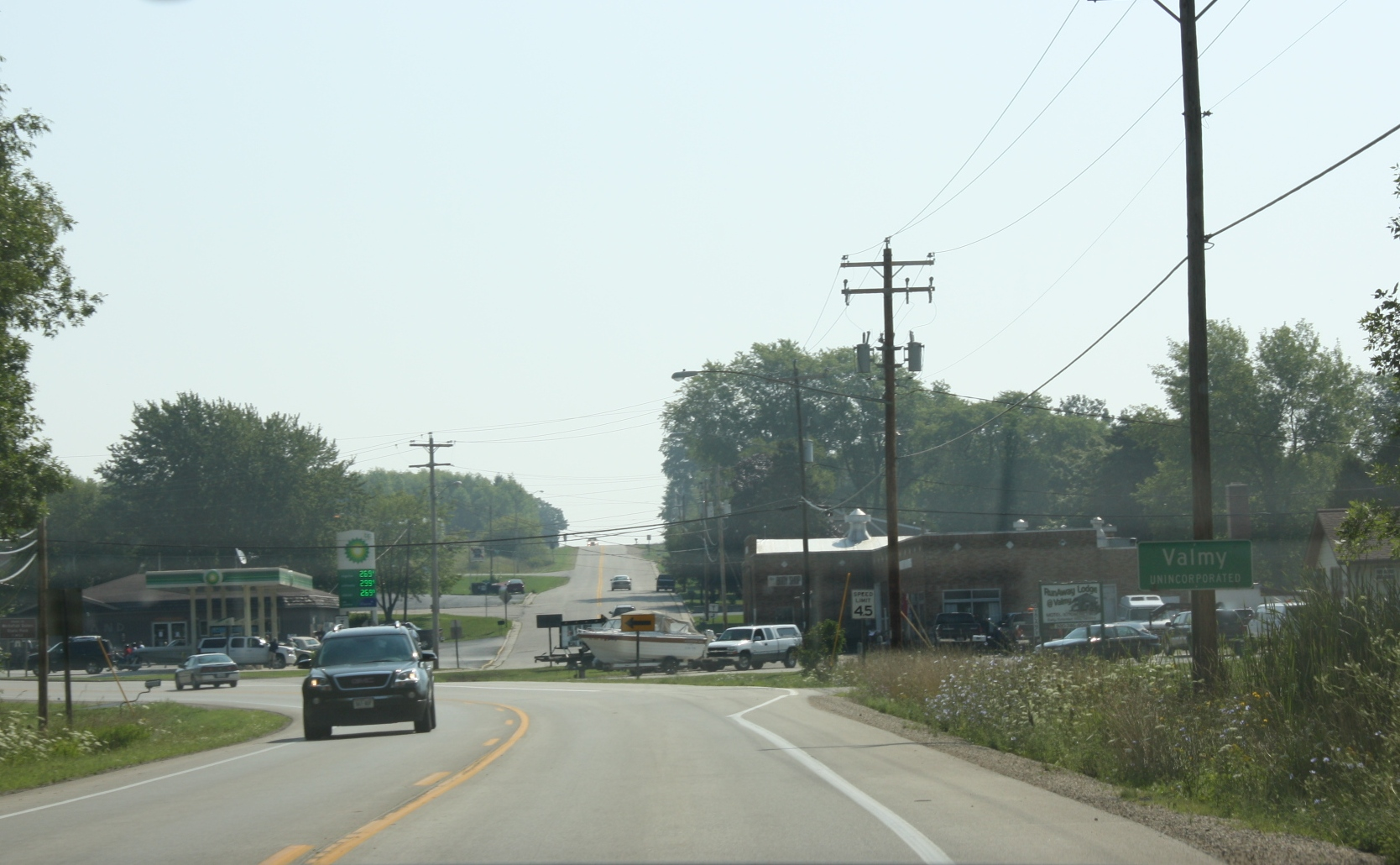
Looking east at the welcome sign on WIS 57

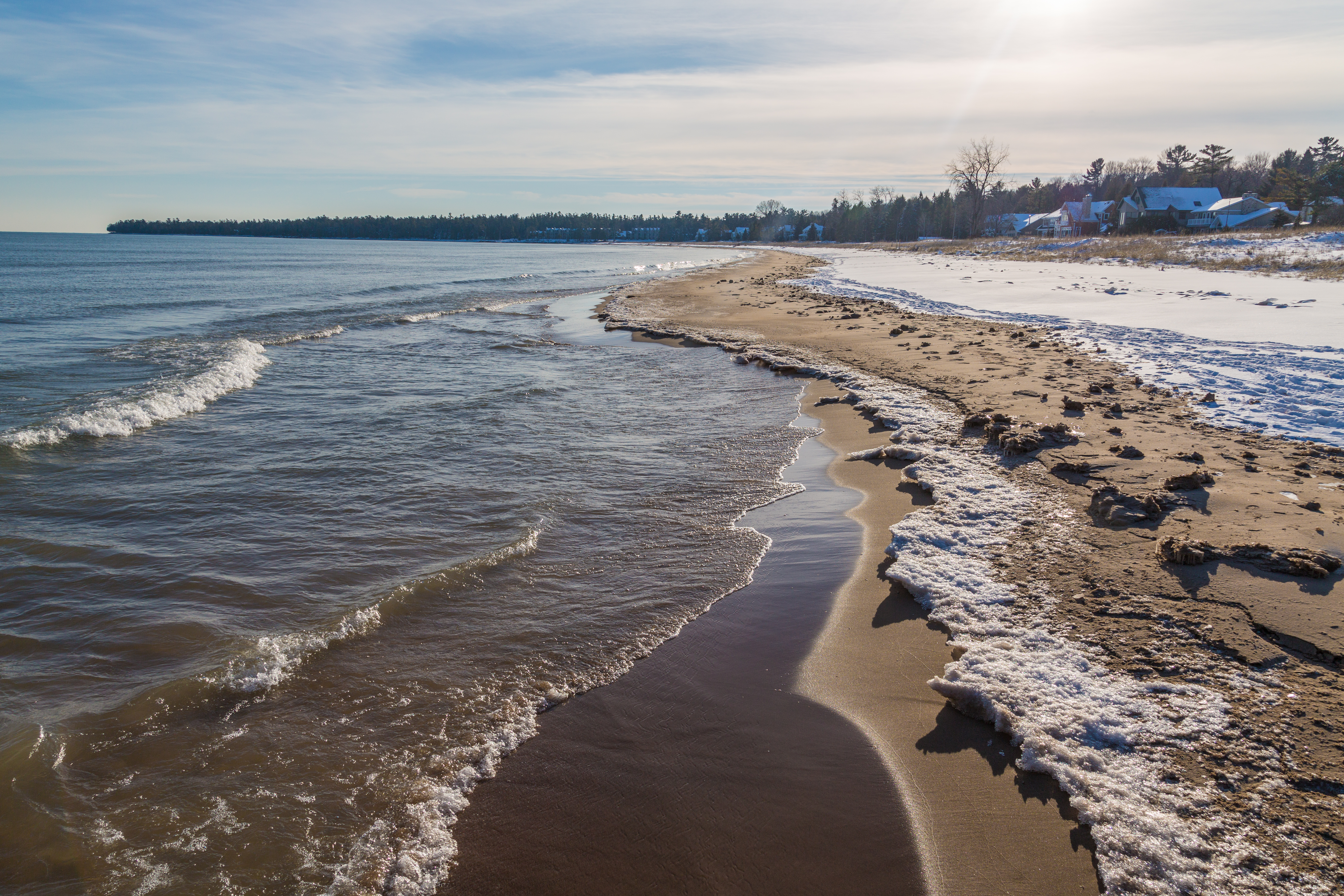
Whitefish Bay Area on January 1, 2017

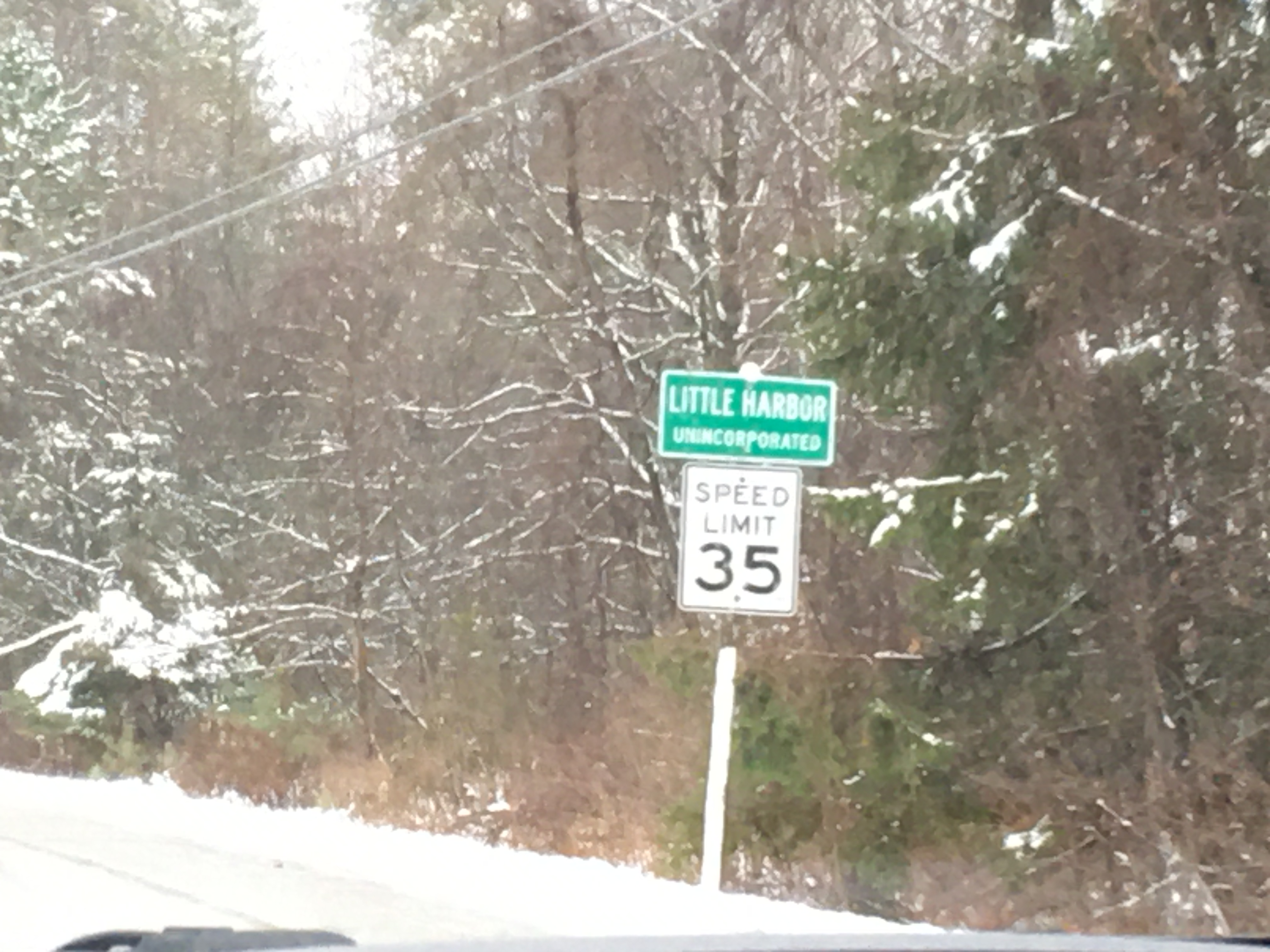
Welcome sign for Little Harbor on County Road B
