= Success Academy =

Success Academy may refer to:

- SUCCESS Academy, high schools in Utah
- Success Academy Charter Schools, charter school network in New York City

== See also ==
- Ninth Grade Success Academy (disambiguation)
