= Successor ideology =

Political concept attributed to essayist Wesley Yang

"Successor ideology" is a term coined by essayist Wesley Yang to describe what he sees as an emergent ideology within liberal or left-wing political movements in the United States, Canada, and to a lesser extent other Western countries. Centered around intersectionality, social justice, identity politics, and anti-racism, the rise of which, Yang argues, the ideology is degrading conventional liberal values of pluralism, freedom of speech, color blindness, and free inquiry. Proponents of the concept link it to an alleged growth in the intolerance of differing opinions, to cancel culture, wokeness, social justice warriors, and to the far left; Yang himself describes it as "authoritarian Utopianism that masquerades as liberal humanism while usurping it from within."

The thesis garnered support from some commentators around 2020–2021, with Roger Berkowitz linking it to a broader retreat of liberalism worldwide that is challenged from the left in the form of the successor ideology and from the political right in the form of illiberal democracy. Matt Taibbi called the ideas of those he associates with the ideology "toxic" and "unattractive". The concept has also come under criticism, with some commentators arguing that the term does not accurately describe trends within left-wing movements and others considering it a reactionary concept.

== Origins ==
The term was coined by political writer Wesley Yang in a 4 March 2019 Twitter thread discussing diversity in college admissions and among the professional-managerial class. Following a tweet arguing that the end-point of an emergent racial ideology is "critical race theory", Yang stated: "This successor ideology has been a rival to the meritocratic one and has in recent years acquired sufficient power to openly seek hegemony on campuses and elsewhere." He expanded on the term in further tweets in May 2019, and in a 2021 blog post, and has appeared on podcasts by The Wall Street Journal and the Manhattan Institute for Policy Research to promote it.

== Response ==
Sarah Jeong, writing in The Verge, has argued that the term "seems to only muddy the waters since the thing that [critics of the 'successor ideology'] are concerned about isn't actually a concrete ideology but an inchoate social force with the hallmarks of religious revival."

Political writer Osita Nwanevu contends that, counter to the narrative that the successor ideology is fundamentally illiberal, it is actually those who are identified with it who are "protecting—indeed expanding—the bounds of liberalism", while it is those who oppose it—whom he calls reactionaries—who are "most guilty of the illiberalism they claim has overtaken the American Left."

== See also ==
- Diversity, equity, and inclusion
- Blue hair § American politics
- Regressive left
- Woke capitalism
