= HMAS Success (H02) =

S-class destroyer of Royal Australian Navy

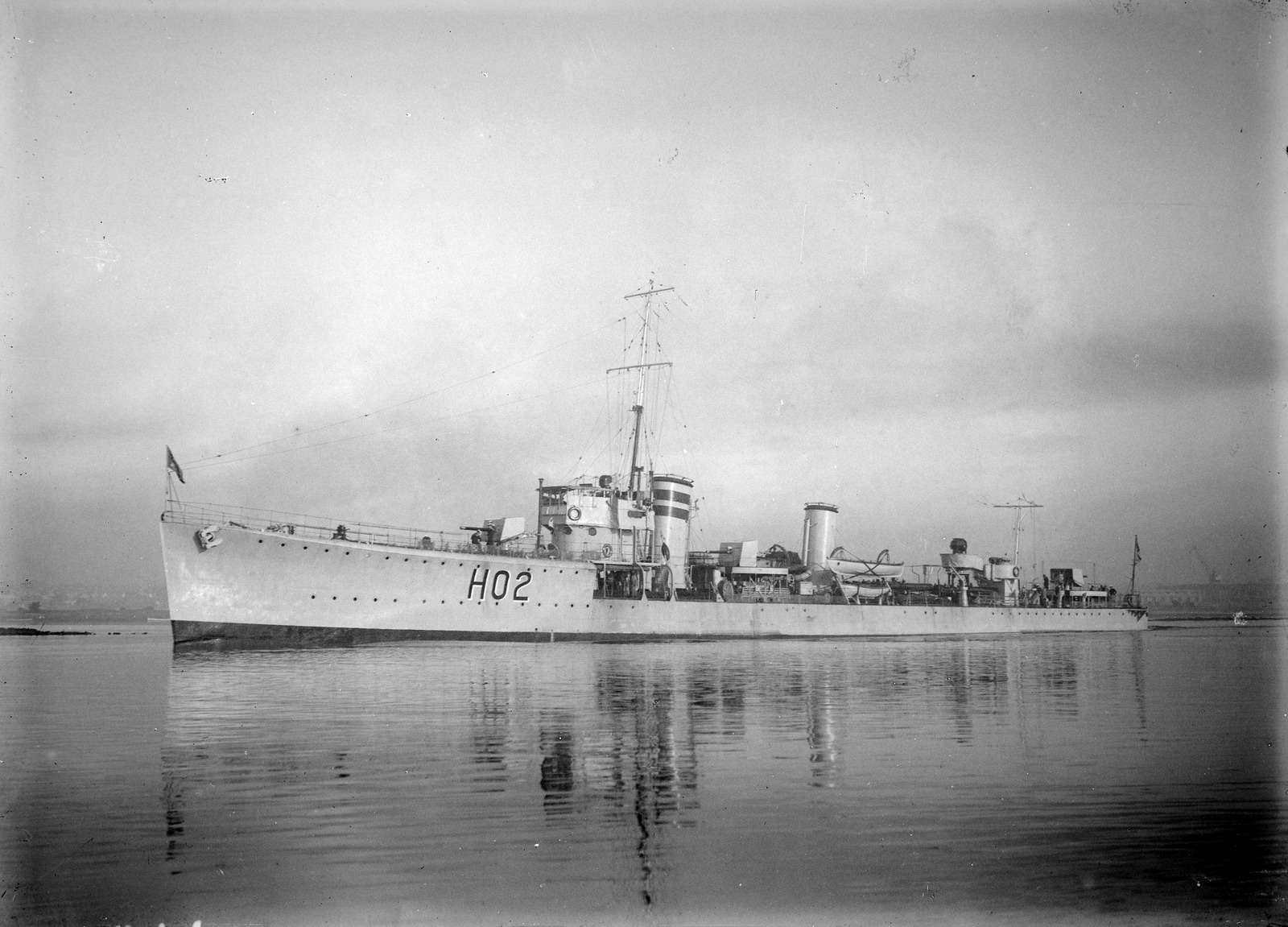
- HMAS Success

History

Australia
- Name: Success
- Builder: William Doxford and Sons Limited
- Laid down: 1917
- Launched: 29 June 1918
- Completed: 15 April 1919
- Commissioned: Royal Navy: April 1919; RAN: 27 January 1920
- Decommissioned: 21 May 1930
- Fate: Sold for scrap on 4 June 1937

General characteristics
- Class & type: Admiralty S-class destroyer
- Displacement: 1,075 tons
- Length: 276 ft 2.25 in (84.1820 m) length overall; 265 ft (81 m) between perpendiculars
- Beam: 26 ft 8.25 in (8.1344 m)
- Draught: 14 ft 2.75 in (4.3371 m)
- Propulsion: 3 × Yarrow boilers, Brown-Curtis turbines, 27,000 shp (20,000 kW), 2 shafts
- Speed: 31 knots (57 km/h; 36 mph)
- Range: 2,990 nautical miles (5,540 km; 3,440 mi) at 11.5 knots (21.3 km/h; 13.2 mph)
- Complement: 6 officers, 93 sailors
- Armament: 3 × QF 4-inch Mk IV guns; 1 × 2-pounder pom-pom; 2 × 9.5-inch howitzers; 5 × .303-inch machine guns; 2 × twin 21-inch torpedo tube sets; 2 depth charge throwers; 4 depth charge chutes

HMAS Success was an Admiralty S-class destroyer of the Royal Australian Navy (RAN). Built for the Royal Navy during World War I, the ship was not completed until 1919, and spent less than eight months in British service before being transferred to the RAN at the start of 1920. The destroyer's career was uneventful, with almost all of it spent in Australian waters. Success was decommissioned in 1930, and was sold for ship breaking in 1937.

== Design and construction ==
Success was built to the Admiralty design of the S-class destroyer, which was designed and built as part of the British emergency war programme. The destroyer had a displacement of 1,075 tons, a length of 276 feet 2.25 inches (84.1820 m) overall and 265 feet (81 m) between perpendiculars, and a beam of 26 feet 8.25 inches (8.1344 m). The propulsion machinery consisted of three Yarrow boilers feeding Brown-Curtis turbines, which supplied 27,000 shaft horsepower (20,000 kW) to the ship's two propeller shafts. Success had a maximum speed of 31 knots (57 km/h; 36 mph), and a range of 2,990 nautical miles (5,540 km; 3,440 mi) at 11.5 knots (21.3 km/h; 13.2 mph). The ship's company was made up of 6 officers and 93 sailors.

The destroyer's primary armament consisted of three QF 4-inch Mark IV guns. These were supplemented by a 2-pounder pom-pom, two 9.5-inch howitzer bomb throwers, five .303 inch machine guns (a mix of Lewis and Maxim guns), two twin 21-inch torpedo tube sets, two depth charge throwers, and two depth charge chutes.

Success was laid down by William Doxford and Sons Limited at their Sunderland shipyard in 1917. The destroyer was launched on 29 June 1918, and completed on 15 April 1919. The ship was briefly commissioned into the Royal Navy in April 1919, but was quickly marked for transfer to the RAN, along with four sister ships. Success was commissioned into the RAN on 27 January 1920.

== Operational history ==
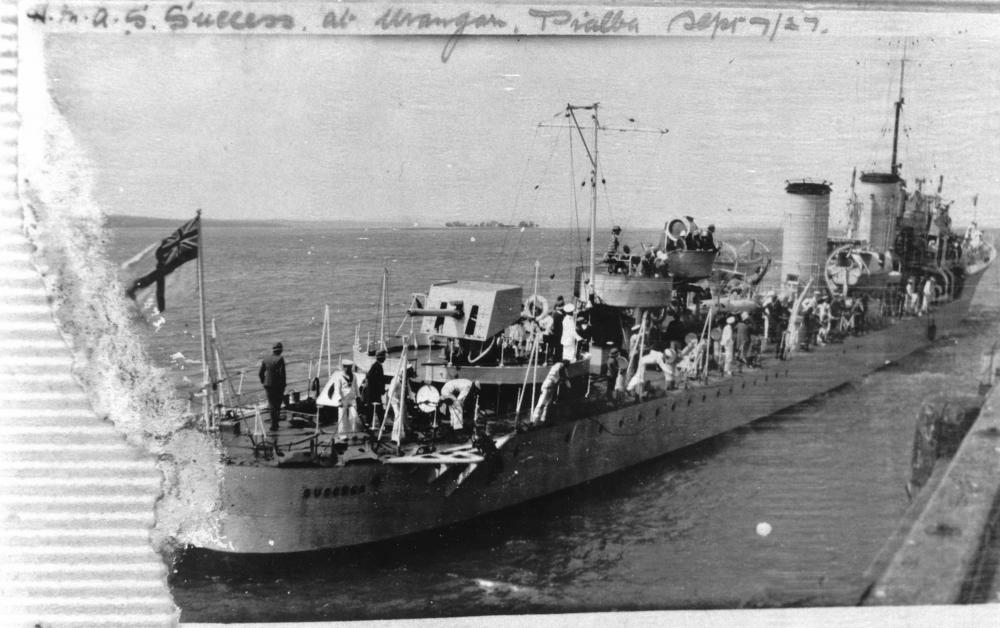
StateLibQld 1 78785 Success (ship)

Success and three of her sister ships sailed for Australia on 20 February, visiting ports in the Mediterranean, India, Singapore, and the Netherlands East Indies before reaching Sydney on 29 April. Success operated in Australian waters until 6 October 1921, when she was placed in reserve. The destroyer was reactivated on 1 December 1925. In late May 1926, Success visited Port Moresby.

== Decommissioning and fate ==
Success paid off on 21 May 1930. She was sold to Penguins Limited for ship breaking in 1937.
