= Succession =

Succession is the act or process of following in order or sequence.

== Governance and politics ==
- Order of succession, in politics, the ascension to power by one ruler, official, or monarch after the death, resignation, or removal from office of another, usually in a clearly defined order
- Succession of states, in international relations, is the process of recognition and acceptance of a newly created state by other states, based on a perceived historical relationship the new state has with a prior state
- Succession planning, in organizations, identifying and developing individuals to succeed to senior positions in government, business, organizations, etc.
- Successor company / Successor corporation / Successor in Business
- Apostolic succession, the doctrine, held by some Christian denominations, that bishops are the successors of the original Twelve Apostles

== Inheritance ==
- Succession refers to the process by which a deceased person's individual rights and property are transferred to their heirs according to a formula in law or religion, while inheritance refers to the actual property or assets that those heirs receive.
- Forced heirship, a form of succession which passes how an estate is to be disposed

== Science and mathematics ==
- Ecological succession, the series of changes in an ecological community that occur over time after a disturbance
  - Primary succession, when there is a new substrate with no existing vegetation, as after a volcanic lava flow
  - Secondary succession, when the substrate has sustained vegetation, as after a fire or flood
- Succession (geology), in geology, a group of rocks or strata that succeed one another in chronological order
- Successor function, a primitive recursive function in mathematics used to define addition

== Arts, entertainment, and media ==
- Simultaneity succession, a particular type of simultaneity in music
- "Succession" (30 Rock), an episode of 30 Rock
- Succession (TV series), an HBO TV series

== See also ==
- Successor (disambiguation)
