= Whitefish Dunes State Park =

State park in Wisconsin, United States

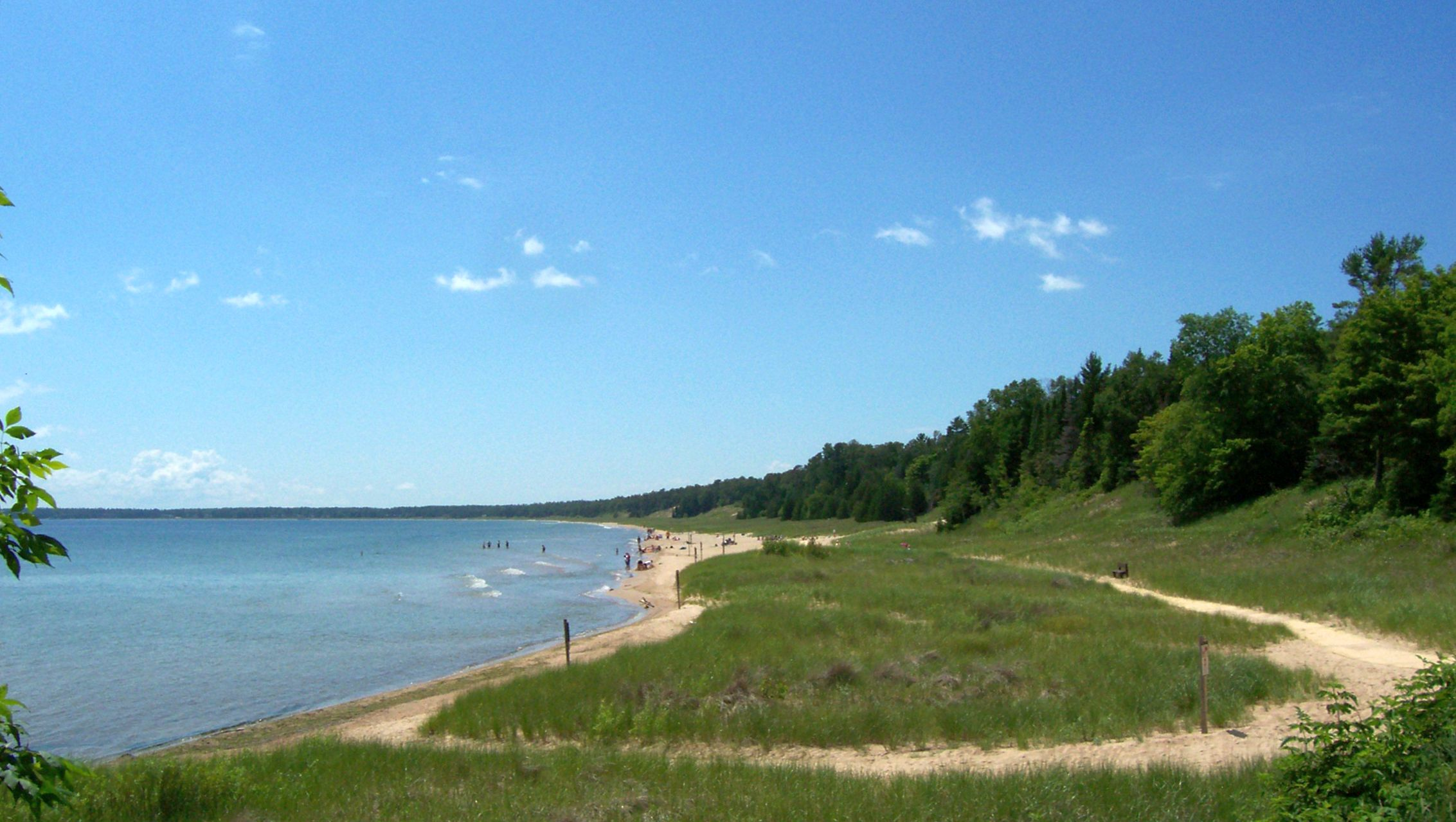
- A Lake Michigan beach in Whitefish Dunes State Park

- Location within Wisconsin Location within the United States
- Interactive map of Whitefish Dunes State Park
- Location: Door County, Wisconsin, United States
- Coordinates: 44°55′13″N 87°12′16″W
- Area: 867 acres (351 ha)
- Established: 1967
- Administrator: Wisconsin Department of Natural Resources
- Website: Official website
- Wisconsin State Parks

Whitefish Dunes State Park is a 867-acre (351 ha) state park of Wisconsin on the eastern shore of the Door Peninsula. This day-use park preserves the most substantial sand dunes on the western shore of Lake Michigan. The remains of eight successive prehistoric Native American villages are on the National Register of Historic Places as Whitefish Dunes-Bay View Site. Cave Point County Park is an enclave inside the state park, allowing visitors free foot access to the state park by the shoreline trail connecting the parks.

== History ==
From 100 B.C. to the later 1800s there is evidence of early settlers. The North Bay people occupied the area from 100 B.C. to A.D. 300, leaving pottery in the dunes. Their descendants, the Heins Creek people, then occupied the area. In the Late Woodland period, there were two occupations: a group settling there from A.D. 800-900, and the Oneota, who arrived around A.D. 900. In the early 1800s, fishing camps were established in the area, including one by New Englander James Pearson Clark. Maritime trade began to grow.

== Recreation ==
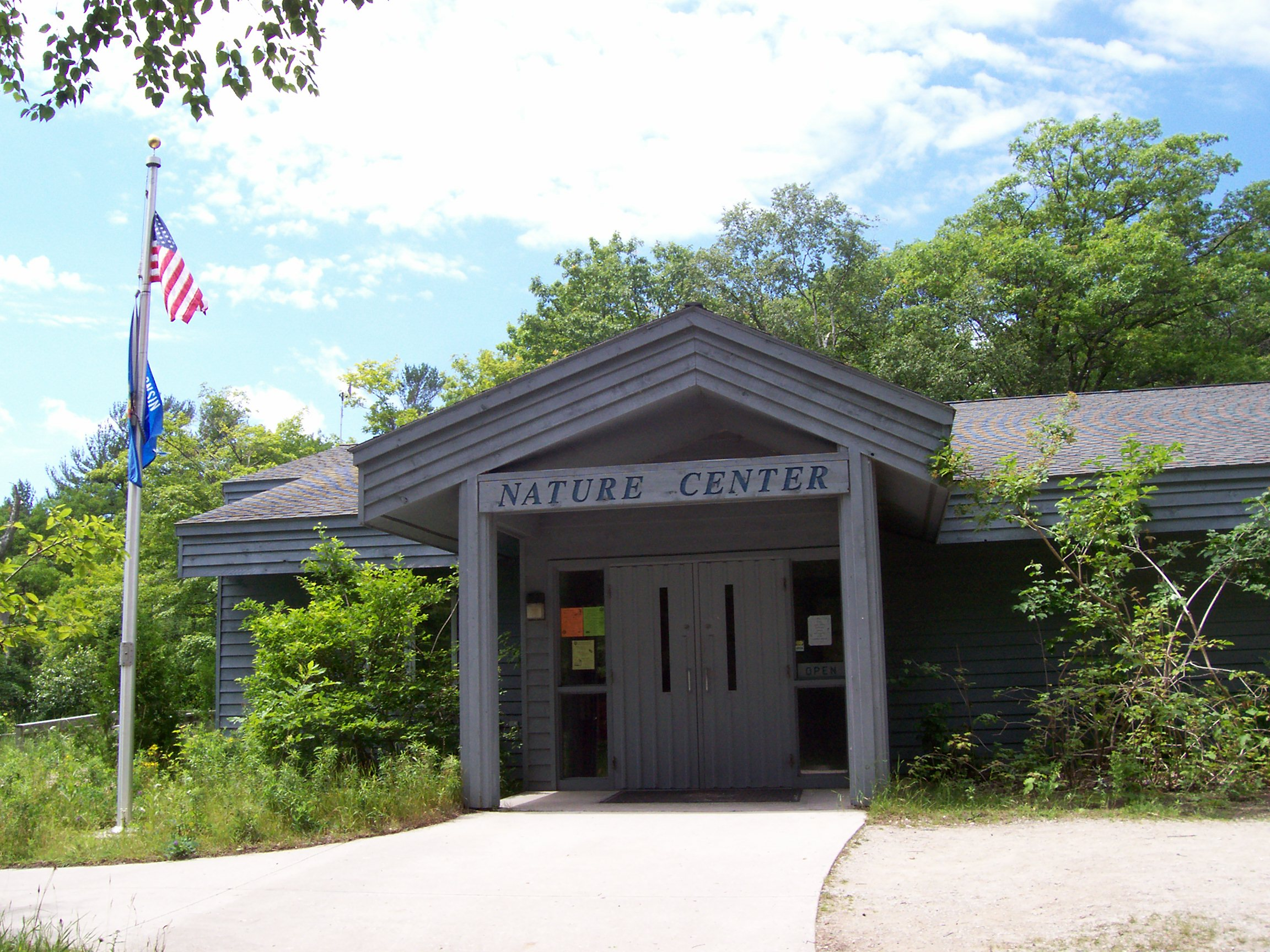
The nature center

Recreational activities at Whitefish Dunes include hiking, fishing, canoeing, boating, and swimming. There are several picnic tables located throughout the park and shelters to rent. During the winter there is skiing and snowshoeing.

The Whitefish Dunes Nature Center features exhibits about the ecology, geology and cultural history of the park. The center is open year-round. There are programs offered for children and adults to learn about the park's natural history and cultural history. Naturalists are available to answer questions as well as give tours.

There are multiple trails within the park. The Black trail is 2.5 miles (4 km) long through the woods with rock exposure. The Brachipod trail is 1.5 miles (2.4 km) long with fossils and nature views. The Clark Lake Spur trail is .7 miles (1.1 km) long. The Green trail is 1.8 miles (2.9 km) long. There are also the Red, Red Pine, Whitefish Creek Spur, and Yellow trails.

== Nature ==
Mammals that inhabit the park include rabbits, raccoons, skunks, squirrels, and woodchucks. Reptiles and amphibians inhabit the dunes, including frogs, painted turtles, salamanders, and snakes. Whitefish Dunes State Natural Area, a 230-acre (93 ha) area within the state park, protects rare species of plants such as the prairie sand-reed grass and the dune thistle.

== Dune erosion and building ==
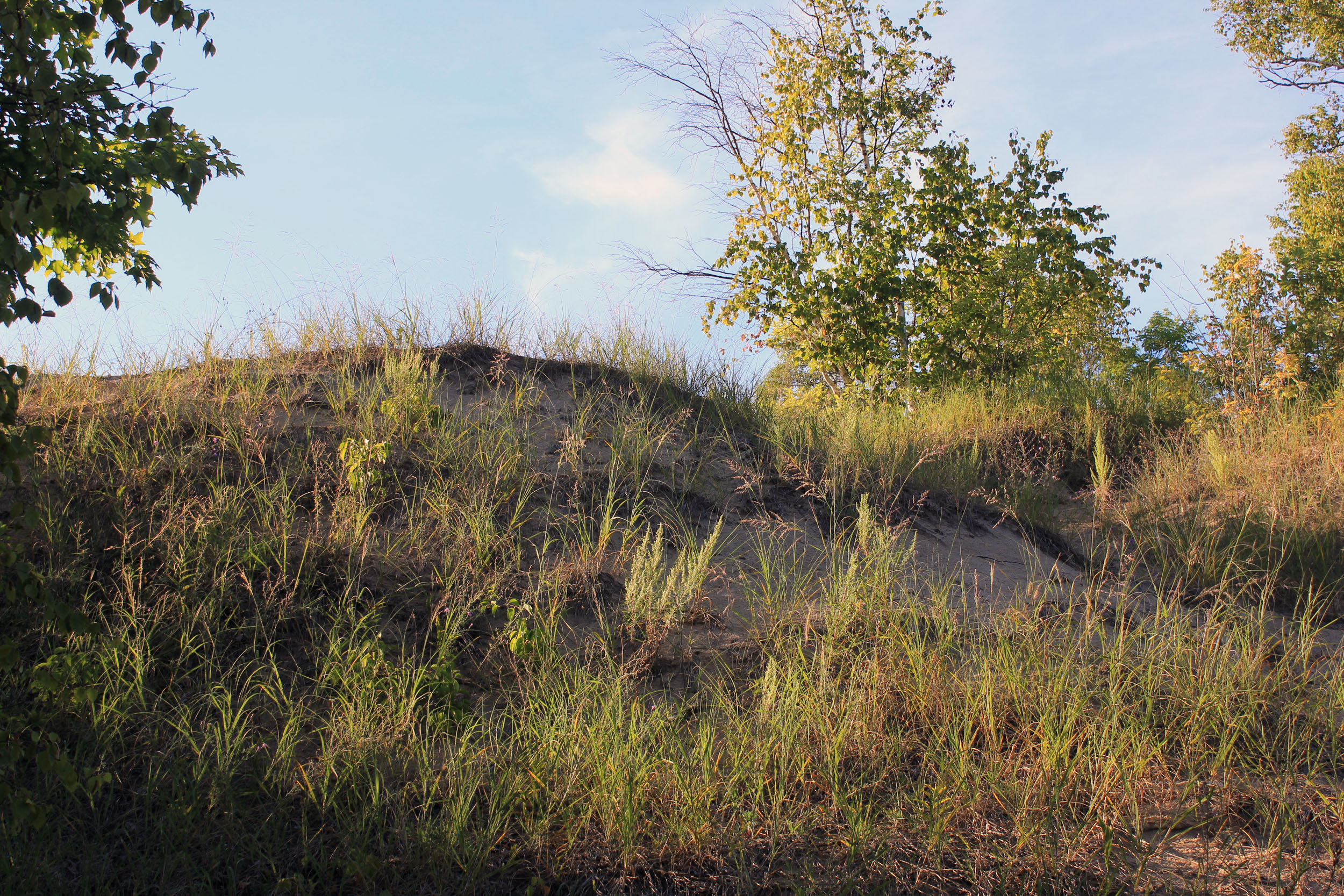
A dune

When the fine sands are exposed, the wind begins to remove them. The tallest dunes are stabilized by vegetation. There are also areas of active dunes, these are smaller in stature and probably will not grow very tall.

Erosion by water of the shoreline occurs in sandy areas along the lake. There are especially high lake levels at the peak of the 11-year cycle. High waters can combine with storm-driven waves for increased erosion. Vast amounts of sand are eroded from the shoreline and dunes during these periods of high lake levels. As the waters begin to recede, the expanse of beach exposed increases, and the fine sand particles are exposed to the winds and the process of dune-building begins anew.

== Geology ==
Several fossils were found at the dunes from sediment at the bottom of the water. Fossil sea shells and coral reefs can be seen today at the dunes. The wind and water constantly change and reform the dunes. The wind forces the sand to drop and form a pile, also known as a sand dune. Not many plants make it in the sand dune but the marram grass can survive the winds and water of the dunes.

The park includes an esker.

== Climate ==
Whitefish Dunes State Park

Climate chart (precipitation, max. and min. temperature)
| J | F | M | A | M | J | J | A | S | O | N | D |
| 57 −2 −7 | 54 −5 −7 | 60 0 −2 | 129 2 −1 | 93 6 2 | 85 11 8 | 97 14 12 | 78 16 14 | 87 17 16 | 129 9 9 | 85 4 4 | 65 3 1 |
- █ Average max. and min. temperatures in °C
- █ Precipitation totals in mm
Imperial conversion
| J | F | M | A | M | J | J | A | S | O | N | D |
| 2.2 28 19 | 2.1 23 19 | 2.4 32 28 | 5.1 36 30 | 3.7 43 36 | 3.3 52 46 | 3.8 57 54 | 3.1 61 57 | 3.4 63 61 | 5.1 48 48 | 3.3 39 39 | 2.6 37 34 |
- █ Average max. and min. temperatures in °F
- █ Precipitation totals in inches

== Gallery ==
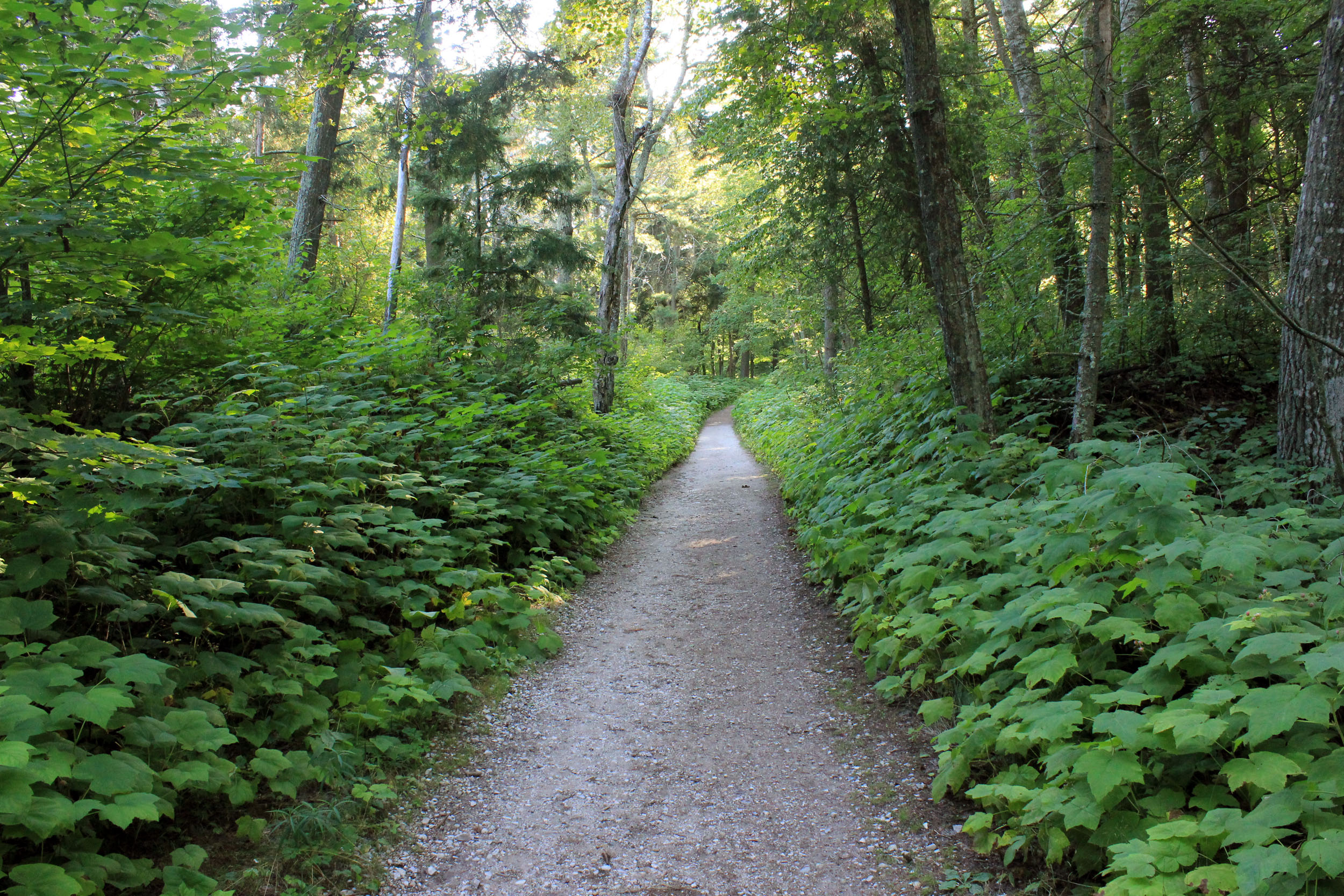
Trail

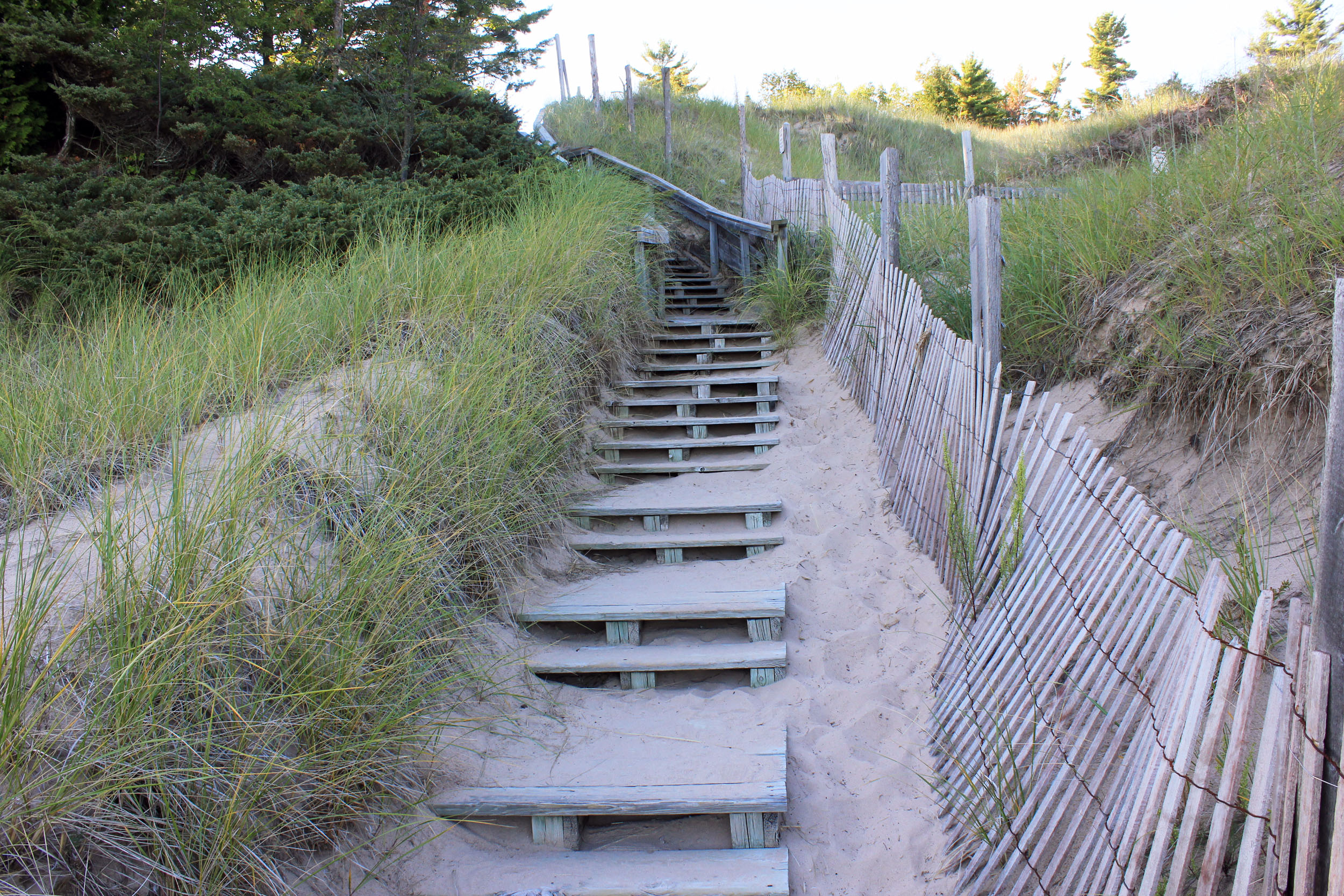
Steps up a dune

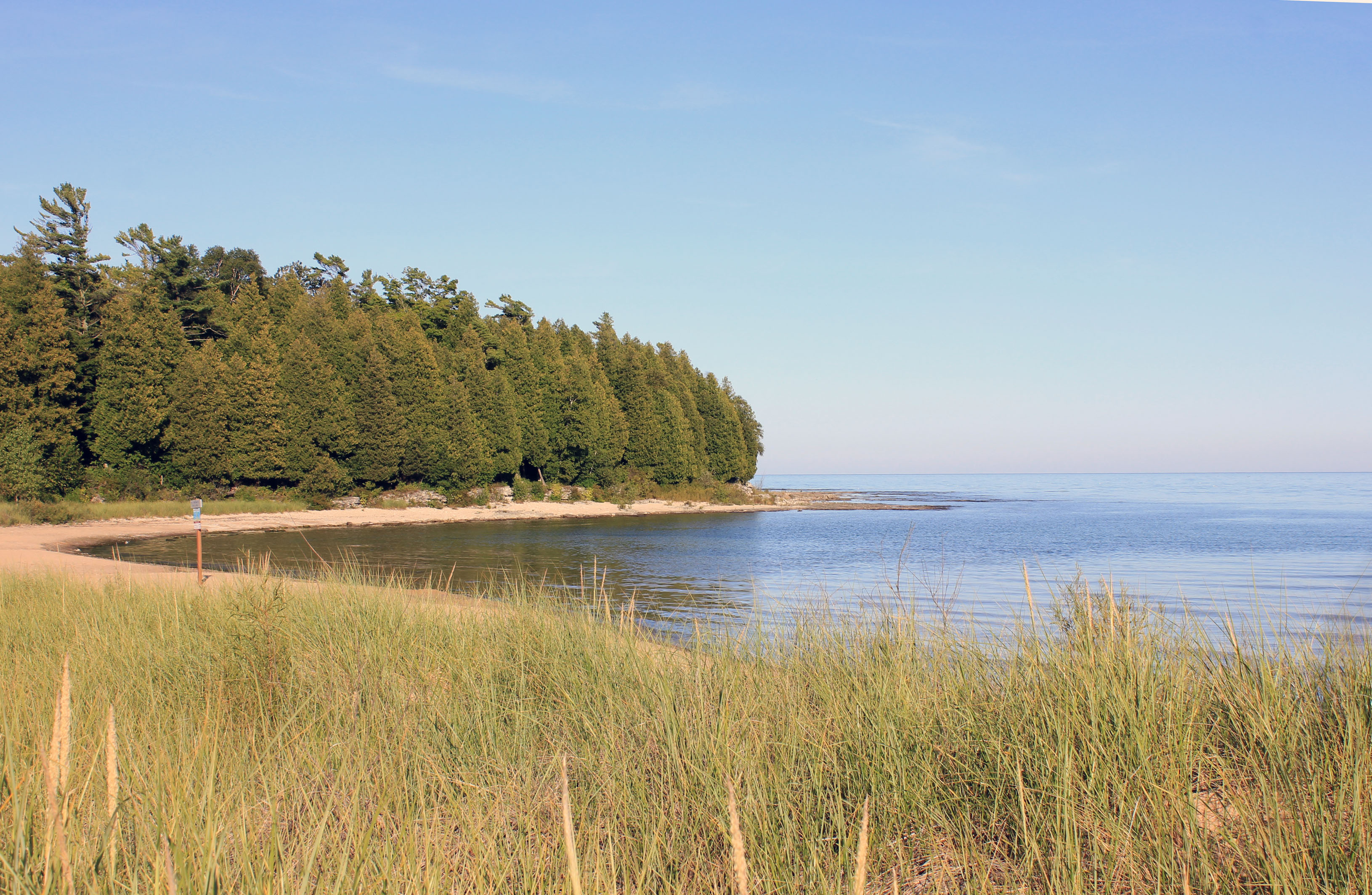
Whitefish Bay

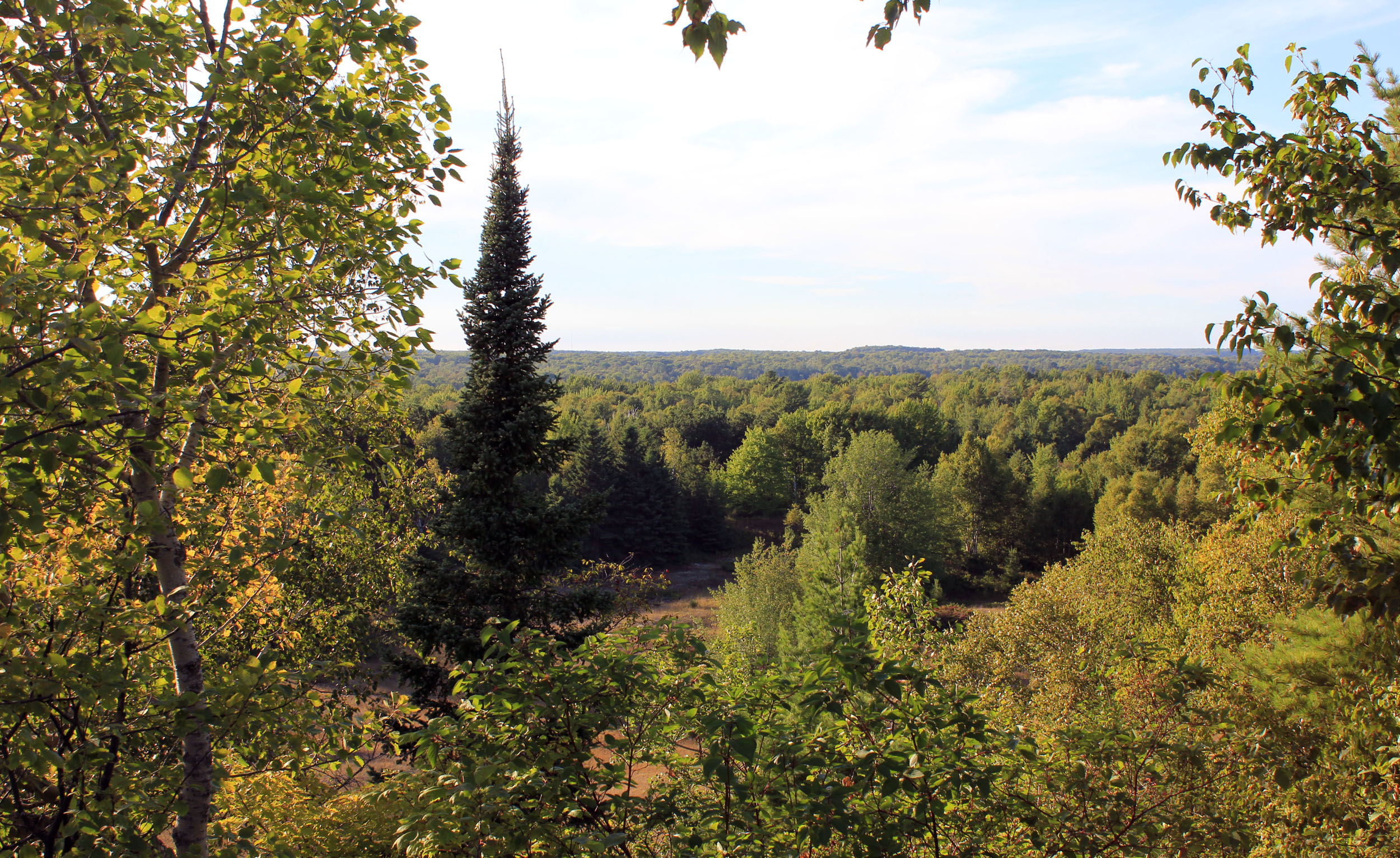
View from Old Baldy

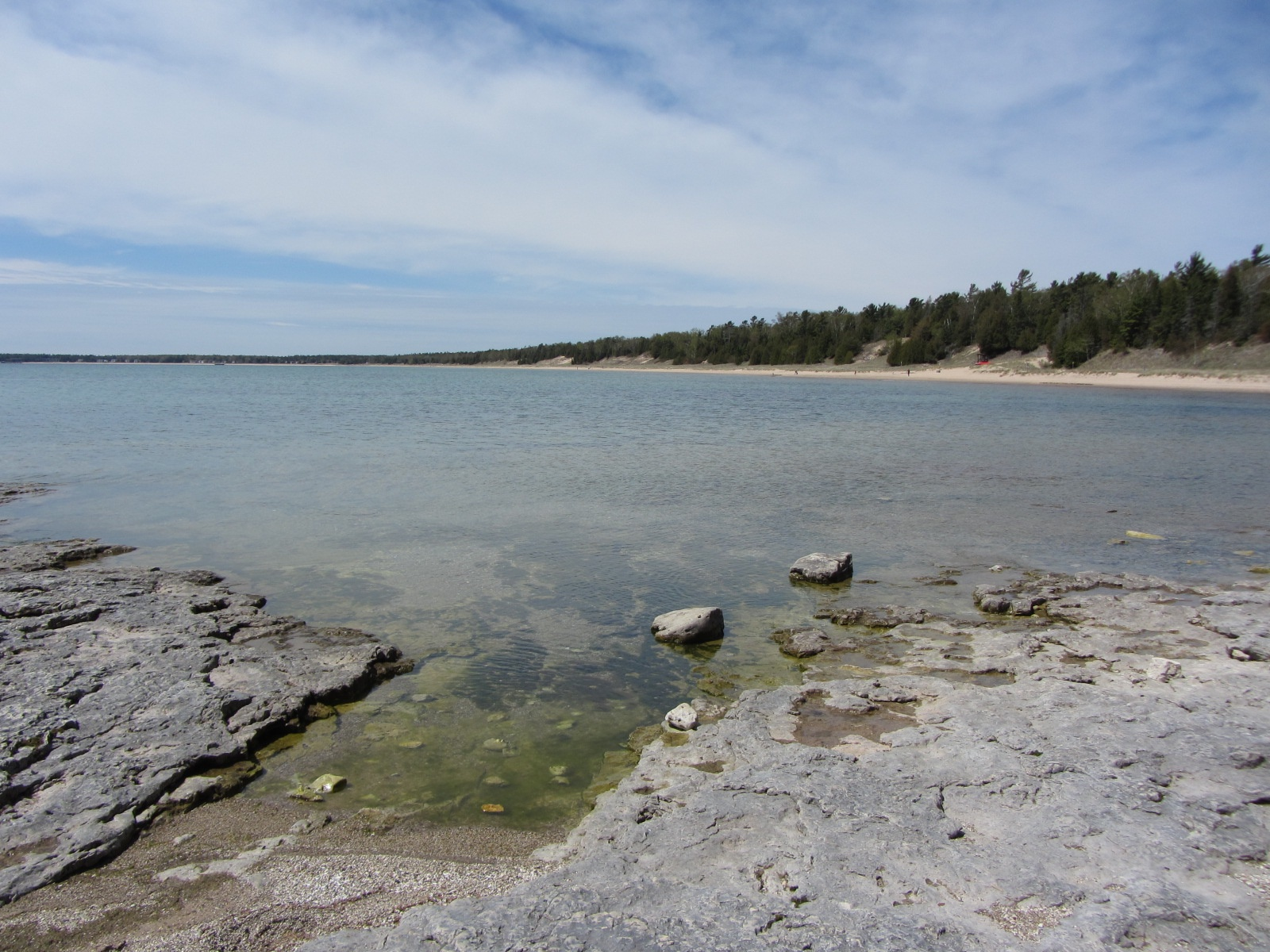
Beach

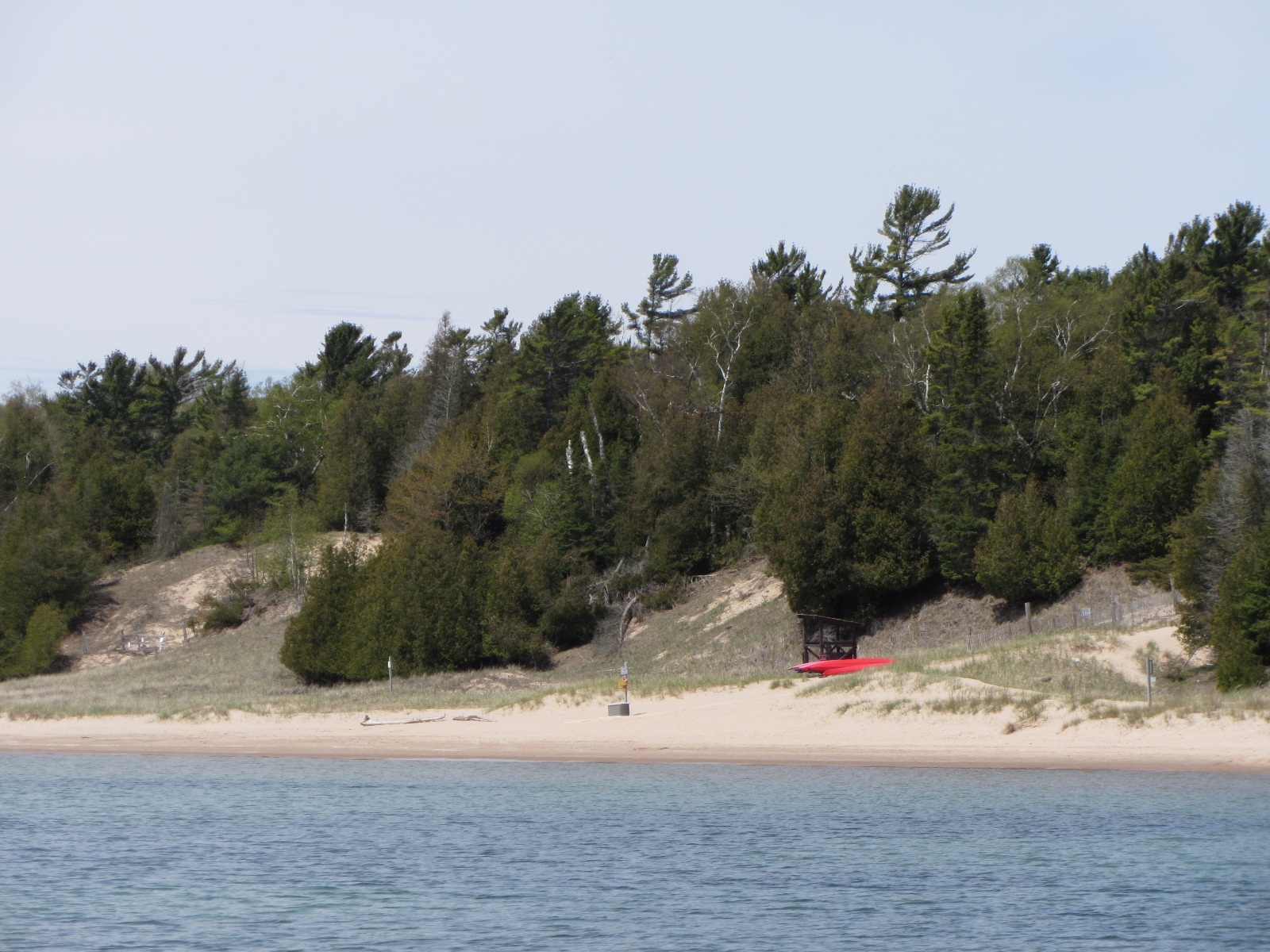
Beach #3
