= List of lighthouses in Wisconsin =

Lighthouses in Wisconsin, USA

This is a list of all lighthouses in the U.S. state of Wisconsin as identified by the United States Coast Guard and other historical sources.

If not otherwise noted, focal height and coordinates are taken from the United States Coast Guard Light List, while location and dates of activation, automation, and deactivation are taken from the United States Coast Guard Historical information site for lighthouses.

Name	Image	Location	Coordinates	Year first lit	Automated	Year deactivated	Current Lens	Focal Height
Algoma Pierhead Light		Algoma		1932	1973	Active	Plastic	48 ft (15 m)
Ashland Harbor Breakwater Light		Ashland		1915	1962	Active	250mm	60 ft (18 m)
Asylum Light		Oshkosh		Never Lit	N/A	N/A	None	Unknown
Baileys Harbor Light		Baileys Harbor		1853	Never	1869 (Now a private home)	None	54 ft (16 m)
Baileys Harbor Range Front Light		Baileys Harbor		1870	1930	Active (Inactive: 1969–2015)	LED	21 ft (6.4 m)
Baileys Harbor Range Rear Light		Baileys Harbor		1870	1930	Active (Inactive: 1969–2015)	LED	36 ft (11 m)
Calumet Light		Calumet		1936	Never	Active	Unknown	Unknown
Cana Island Light		Baileys Harbor		1870	1945	Active	Third-Order Fresnel	83 ft (25 m)
Chambers Island Light		Gibraltar (Chambers Island)		1868	1955	1961	None	68 ft (21 m)
Chequamegon Point Light		Apostle Islands (Long Island)		1896	1964	1987	None	42 ft (13 m)
Devils Island Light		Apostle Islands (Devils Island)		1891 (Former); 1901 (Current)	1978	Active	Third-order Fresnel	100 ft (30 m)
Dunlap Reef Range Lights		Sturgeon Bay	N/A	1881	Never	1924 (The rear range light is now a private home)	None	18 ft (5.5 m) (Front Range); 39 ft (12 m) (Rear Range)
Eagle Bluff Light		Ephraim		1868	1926	Active	LED Fifth-Order Fresnel Inactive in tower	75 ft (23 m)
Fond du Lac Light		Fond du Lac		1933	Never	Active	Unknown	Unknown
Grassy Island Range Lights		Green Bay	(Original) (Current)	1872	1934	1966	Sixth-Order Fresnel (Replicas)	35 ft (11 m) (Upper light); 27 ft (8.2 m) (Lower light)
Green Bay Harbor Entrance Light		Green Bay		1935	1979	Active	Unknown	72 ft (22 m)
Green Island Light		Peshtigo (Green Island)		1863	1933	1956 (Now in ruins)	None	55 ft (17 m)
Gull Island Light		Apostle Islands (Gull Island)		1929	Always	Active	250mm	56 ft (17 m)
Kenosha Light (Orig: Kenosha North Pierhead Light)		Kenosha		1840 (Former); 1867 (Current)	1996 (Relit)	Active (Inactive: 1906–1996)	Replica	50 ft (15 m)
Kenosha North Pier Light		Kenosha		1848 (Former); 1906 (Current)	1925	Active	Fourth-order Fresnel	50 ft (15 m)
Kevich Light		Grafton		1981	Always	Active	Halide lamps	163 ft (50 m)
Kewaunee Pierhead Light		Kewaunee		1889 (Former); 1931 (Current)	1981	Active	Vega-44 LED	45 ft (14 m)
La Pointe Light		Apostle Islands (Long Island)		1858 (Former); 1896 (Current)	1964	Active	300mm	70 ft (21 m)
Long Tail Point Light (First)		Green Bay		1848	Never	1859 (Now in ruins)	None	56 ft (17 m)
Long Tail Point Light (Second)		Green Bay	N/A	1859	Never	1899 (Destroyed in 1936)	None	Unknown
Long Tail Point Light (Third)		Green Bay	N/A	1899	1936	1973 (Destroyed)	None	Unknown
Manitowoc Breakwater Light		Manitowoc		1839 (Former); 1918 (Current)	1971	Active	Unknown	52 ft (16 m)
Michigan Island Light (New)		Apostle Islands (Michigan Island)		1929	1943	Active	LED	170 ft (52 m)
Michigan Island Light (Old)		Apostle Islands (Michigan Island)	N/A	1857	Never	1929 (Replaced)	None	Unknown
Milwaukee Breakwater Light		Milwaukee		1899 (Former); 1926 (Current)	1966	Active	Unknown	61 ft (19 m)
Milwaukee Pierhead Light		Milwaukee		1872	1939	Active	Unknown	48 ft (15 m)
Neenah Light (aka:Kimberly Point Lighthouse)		Neenah	N/A	1945	Always	Active	Unknown	Unknown
North Point Light		Milwaukee		1855 (Former); 1888 (Current)	1943	1994	None	154 ft (47 m)
Outer Island Light		Apostle Islands (Outer Island)		1874	1961	Active	VRB-25	130 ft (40 m)
Peshtigo Reef Light		Green Bay (Offshore)		1936	Always	Active	Unknown	72 ft (22 m)
Pilot Island Light		Gills Rock		1858	1962	Active	LED	48 ft (15 m)
Plum Island Range Front Light		Plum Island	(Current location)	1897	Never	1964	None	32 ft (9.8 m)
Plum Island Range Rear Light		Plum Island		1897	1969	Active	LED	84 ft (26 m)
Port Washington Light		Port Washington		1849 (Former); 1860 (Current)	Never	1903 (Now a museum)	Fourth-order Fresnel (Replica)	133 ft (41 m)
Port Washington Breakwater Light		Port Washington		1889 (Former); 1935 (Current)	1976	Active	Unknown	78 ft (24 m)
Pottawatomie Light		Rock Island		1836 (Former); 1858 (Current)	1946	1988	Fourth-order Fresnel (Replica)	159 ft (48 m)
Racine Harbor Light		Racine		1839 (Former); 1901 (Current)	Never	1901	None	75 ft (23 m)
Racine North Breakwater Light		Racine		1872 (Former); 1904 (Current)	Unknown	1987	None	53 ft (16 m)
Racine Reef Light		Racine		1899 (Former); 1906 (Current)	1954	1961	None	72 ft (22 m)
Raspberry Island Light		Apostle Islands (Raspberry Island)		1862	1947	1957 (Now a museum)	None	77 ft (23 m)
Rawley Point Light		Two Rivers		1874 (Former); 1894 (Current)	1979	Active	Optic	113 ft (34 m)
Rockwell Light (aka: Bray's Point Light)		Oshkosh	N/A	1910	Unknown	1965 (Estimated)	None	26 ft (7.9 m)
Sand Island Light		Apostle Islands (Sand Island)		1881	1921	Active (Inactive: 1933–1985)	LED	60 ft (18 m)
Sheboygan Lighthouse		Sheboygan		1839 (Former); 1915 (Current)	Unknown	Active	Unknown	55 ft (17 m)
Sherwood Point Light		Nasewaupee (Idlewild)		1883	1983	Active	LED	61 ft (19 m)
Sturgeon Bay Canal Light		Sturgeon Bay		1899	1972	Active	Third-Order Fresnel Lens (Rotating)	107 ft (33 m)
Sturgeon Bay Canal; North Pierhead Light		Sturgeon Bay		1882 (Former); 1903 (Current)	1972	Active	300mm	40 ft (12 m)
Superior Entry Breakwater Light (aka: Wisconsin Point Light)		Superior		1913	1970	Active	DCB-224	70 ft (21 m)
Two Rivers Light		Two Rivers	(Original) (Current)	1886	Never	1969 (Now a museum)	None	35 ft (11 m)
Wind Point Light		Racine (Wind Point)		1880	1964	Active	VRB-25	111 ft (34 m)
