= SS Erie L. Hackley =

Passenger and cargo ship that operated in Lake Michigan

Coordinates: 45°03.71′N 87°27.37′W

History
- Name: Erie. L. Hackley
- Owner: Levi Joseph Vorous, E.T. Thorpe, and Henry Roberoy
- Builder: J.P. Arnol
- In service: 1882-1903
- Home port: Milwaukee, Wisconsin
- Fate: Sunk in 1903 near Green Island, Wisconsin

General characteristics
- Type: Steam screw
- Tonnage: 54.61
- Length: 79 feet
- Beam: 17.40 feet
- Depth of hold: 5.20
- Propulsion: Steam screw

SS Erie L. Hackley was a passenger and cargo ship that operated in Lake Michigan from 1882 to 1903. The ship sank in a storm near Green Island on 3 October 1903.

== Construction and career ==
The Erie L. Hackley was a wooden steamer built in 1882 in Muskegon, Michigan by J. Arnold. It was 79 feet (24 m) long, with a beam of 17 feet (5.2 m), a depth of 5 feet (1.5 m), and a gross tonnage of 55 tons.

The Erie L. Hackley's first owner was Seth Lee of Muskegon, who operated the Hackley as a ferry between Muskegon and the suburb of North Muskegon (along with another ship, the Centennial).

On 2 August 1902, the Hackley broke its shaft near North Manitou Island, and had to be towed to port.

In the spring of 1903, the Hackley was purchased by Captain Joseph Vorous and three other men, becoming part of the Fish Creek Transportation Company. It carried passengers and cargo on a route from Sturgeon Bay, Wisconsin to Marinette, Wisconsin and Menominee, Michigan, then back across Green Bay to Egg Harbor, Fish Creek and Washington Island, also stopping at Ephraim, Sister Bay, and Ellison Bay

== Loss ==
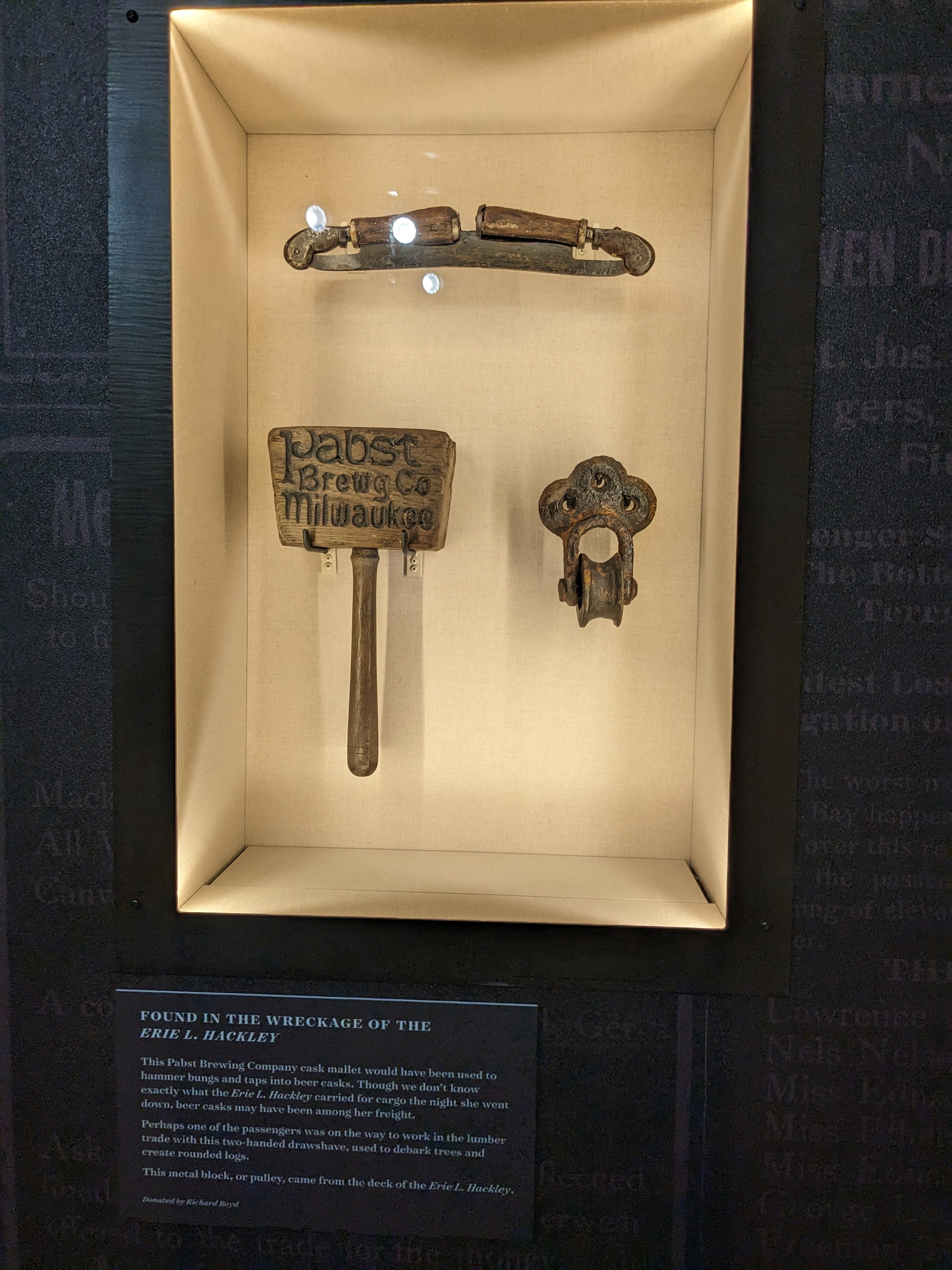
Artifacts from the wreckage of the Erie L. Hackley on display at the Door County Maritime Museum in Sturgeon Bay, WI.

At 5:45 pm on 3 October 1903, the Erie L. Hackley departed Menominee, Michigan, bound for Egg Harbor, Wisconsin. Fifteen minutes after departing, the Erie L. Hackley was just north of Green Island when a sudden storm blew up. The ship began to list and take on water. A giant wave smashed into the ship, carrying away the cabin; the ship then began to sink rapidly. The male passengers and crew placed the female passengers on floating wreckage before grabbing on to wreckage themselves. Captain Vorous stayed in the pilot house, trying to right the ship until he went down with it.

Those who survived the wreck clung to wreckage overnight until the steamer Sheboygan happened upon the scene. The Sheboygan rescued eight survivors; eleven people were lost.

== Aftermath ==
The tugboats Leona R. and Pilgrim attempted to locate the wreck of the Hackley by dragging a chain. They believed they had located the wreck but the depth prevented them from diving to confirm it. A board of inquiry into the sinking determined that the condition of the Hackley was not at fault. In June 1980, divers finally discovered the wreck of the Hackley.
