= Green Island Light =

Green Island Light may refer to:

- Green Island Light (Ohio) in Lake Erie
- Green Island Light (Wisconsin) in Green Bay, Wisconsin
- Green Island Lighthouse Compound in Hong Kong
- Lyudao Lighthouse in Taiwan
