= Grassy Island Range Lights =

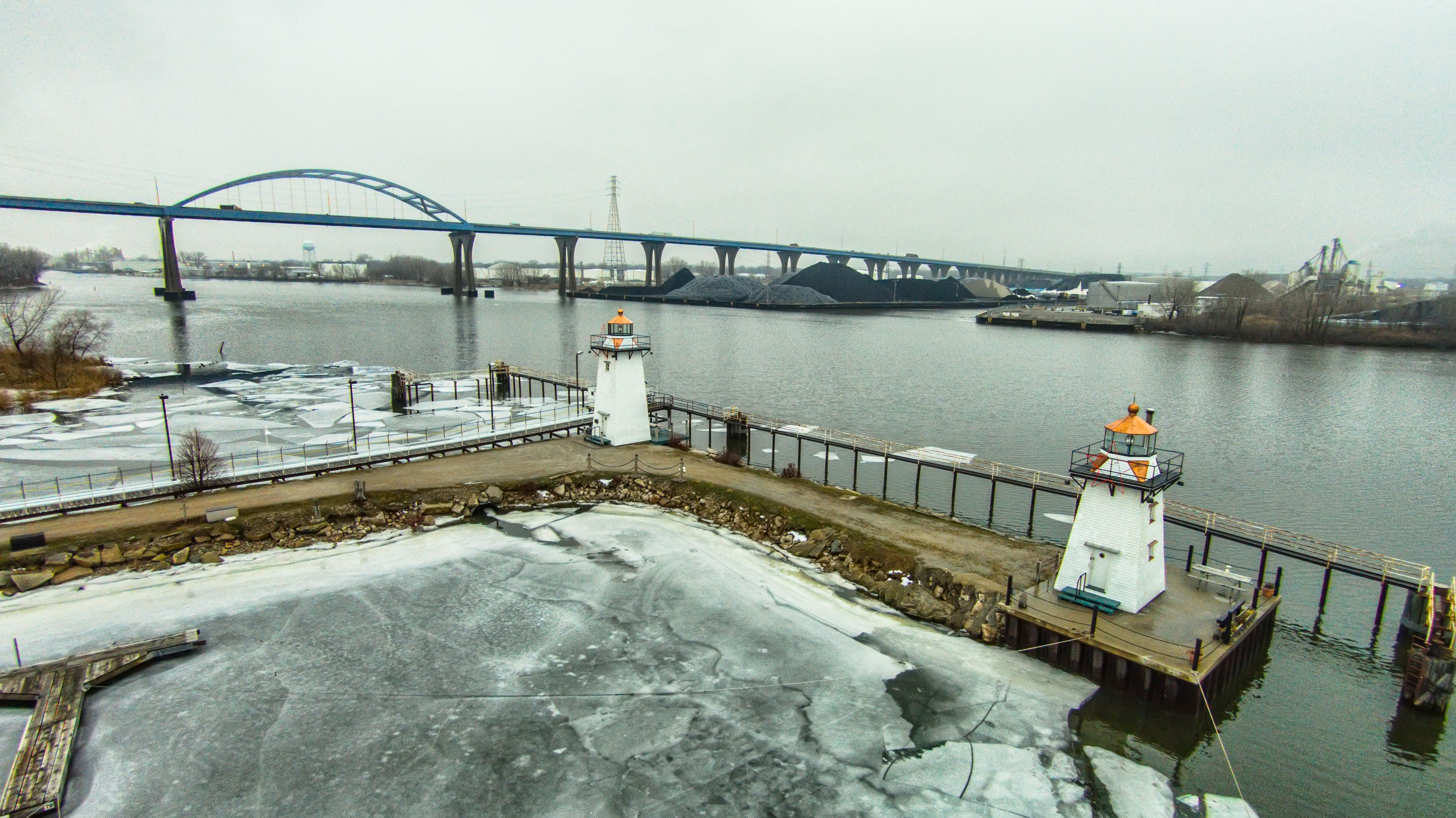
- The Grassy Island Range Lights as relocated (2014)
- Location: Grassy Island north of Green Bay, Wisconsin; relocated to Green Bay Yacht Club grounds
- Coordinates: 44°33′37″N 87°59′35″W original; 44.5362°N 88.0052°W current

Tower
- Constructed: 1872
- Foundation: Pier
- Construction: Wood with cedar shingles
- Automated: 1934
- Shape: Pyramidal tower
- Heritage: National Register of Historic Places listed place

Light
- Deactivated: 1966
- Focal height: 34 ft (10 m) (upper); 27 ft (8.2 m) (lower)
- Lens: Sixth Order Fresnel lens
- Grassy Island Range Lights
- U.S. National Register of Historic Places
- NRHP reference No.: 04001484
- Added to NRHP: January 12, 2005

The Grassy Island Range Lights are a pair of lighthouses originally established to guide traffic through the channel into the harbor at Green Bay, Wisconsin, United States. They were deactivated and moved ashore as part of a channel-widening project.

== History ==
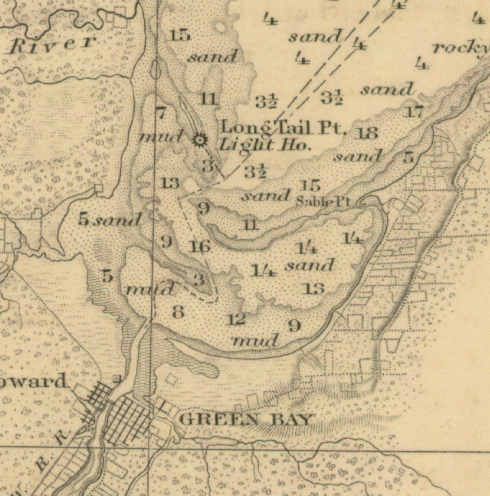
lower Green Bay in 1867 showing the sinuous channel among the sand bars into the harbor

Navigation to the mouth of the Fox River was impeded by a series of sand bars jutting out from either side of Green Bay. In 1837, funds were appropriated to erect a light in the area. An initial recommendation to place a light on Grassy Island (the most southerly bar) was countered by Lieutenant Homans, who found the site unsuitable for durable construction or habitation, being "nearly under water, from the great rise of the lake, since the recommendation for a light upon it was made." Instead, the Long Tail Point Light was erected further north.

In 1866, dredging began on a new channel into the harbor that cut straight across Grassy Island. An appropriation of $11,000 for construction of lights had been included in the 1864 budget. Delays in harbor improvements caused the funds to revert to the treasury, requiring a new appropriation in 1870. Construction of the two towers and associated keeper's house followed in 1872. The two towers were largely identical except for their heights: freestanding wooden pyramidal towers covered in shingles, topped by octagonal lanterns holding sixth-order Fresnel lenses. Initially, both displayed a fixed white light. One tower stood at each end of the cut on its eastern side, with the keeper's house between them.

The exposed location led to maintenance issues. The roof of the dwelling was replaced in 1880, barely a decade after construction. A new well was dug in 1884, the first having been filled in by a gale shortly after the station opened. The kitchen and boathouse were rebuilt in 1896; the boathouse was raised further in 1902. In the meantime, a breakwater had been built east of the station.

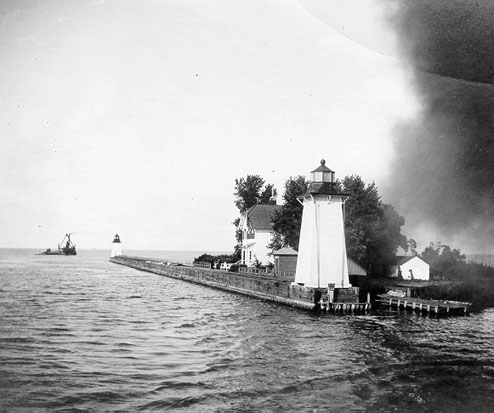
The range in operation in 1914

The lights were automated in 1934 with the installation of acetylene lamps. At the same time, the characteristic of both lights was changed to green, with the front light also flashing, to contrast with the lights of the city. Throughout the station's life, the channel was constantly dredged and widened. Eventually, the decision was made to expand the channel to the east as well as the west. Therefore, in 1966, the decision was made to remove the lights. Members of the Green Bay Yacht Club petitioned the Corps of Engineers for permission to remove and preserve the towers. In November of that year, the lights were moved to the club's parking lot. Much of Grassy Island was removed, and a new automated beacon was erected on what remained.

In 1998, the two towers were relocated to a breakwater at the edge of the yacht club property. They underwent a lengthy restoration and were rededicated in 2005. They were listed on the National Register of Historic Places that year.

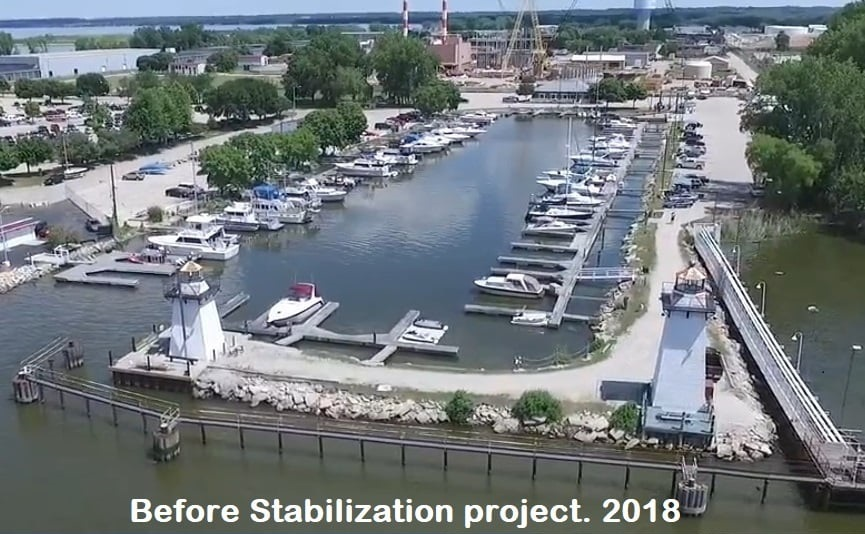
2017 Grassy Is Lights

In 2017, a decision was made to stabilize the breakwater, which had been deteriorating for several years and causing concerns about the lighthouse foundations. Over the next year and a half, the breakwater was reinforced with steel piling. Additionally, the breakwater was widened to accommodate two-way vehicle traffic, a parking area, safety railing, dock access, and other improvements.

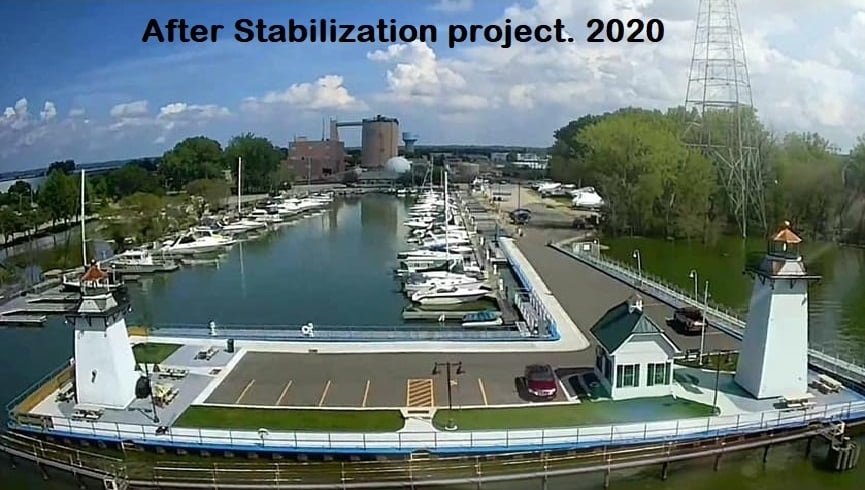
2020 Grassy Is. Lights

By the end of 2019, the final improvements were completed, and the "Lighthouse Park" became the new permanent home for the Grassy Island Range Lights. The project was funded by the David L. and Rita E. Nelson Family Fund and the Community Foundation for the Fox Valley Region.
