= Green Island (Wisconsin) =

Island in Wisconsin, United States

- Location within Wisconsin Location within the United States

Geography
- Location: Green Bay, Lake Michigan
- Coordinates: 45°03′31″N 087°29′46″W
- Highest elevation: 597 ft (182 m)

Administration
- United States
- State: Wisconsin
- County: Marinette
- Town: Peshtigo

Green Island is an island in Green Bay and part of the Town of Peshtigo, in Marinette County, Wisconsin. The Green Island Light is on the island.

== Gallery ==
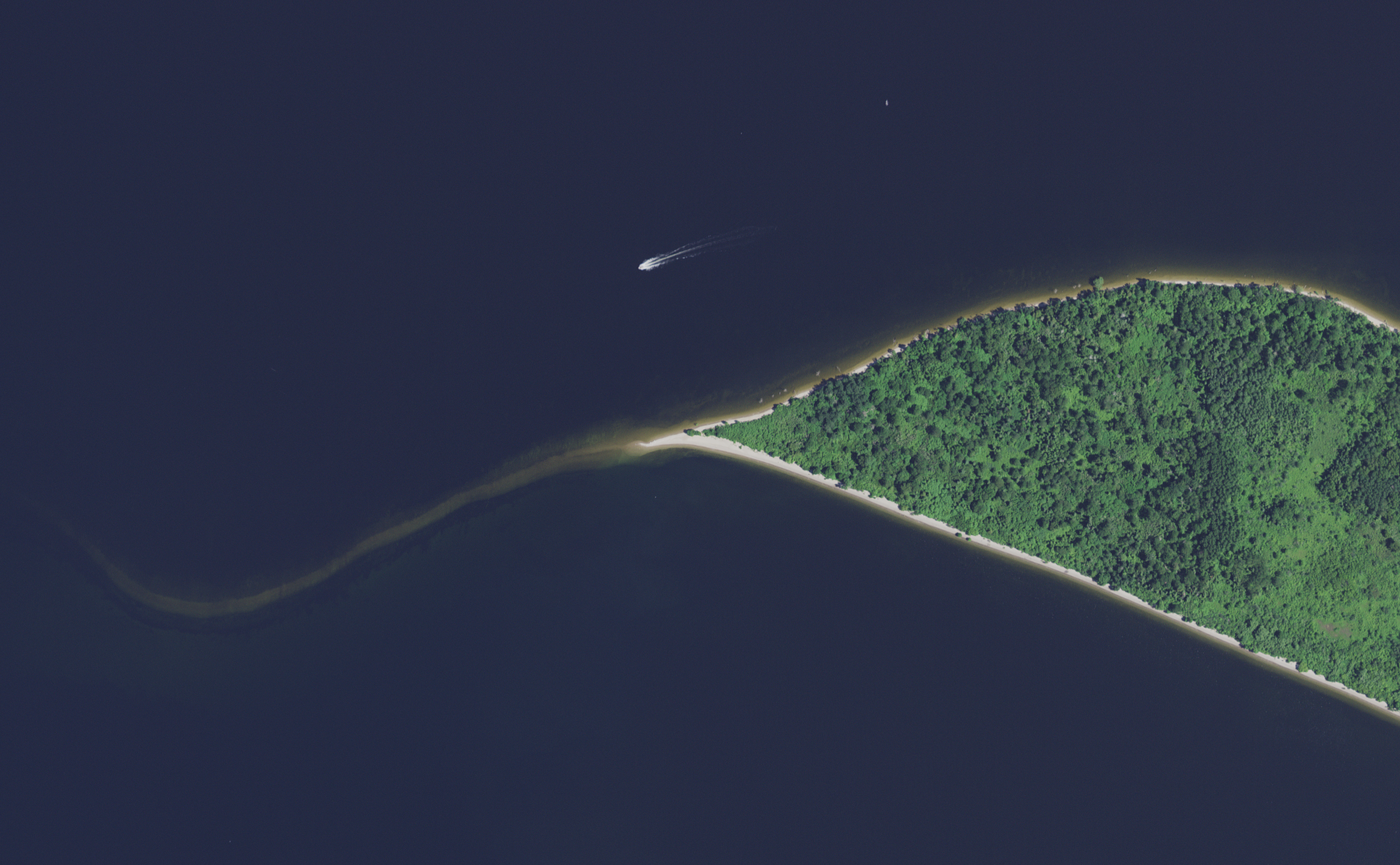
West end

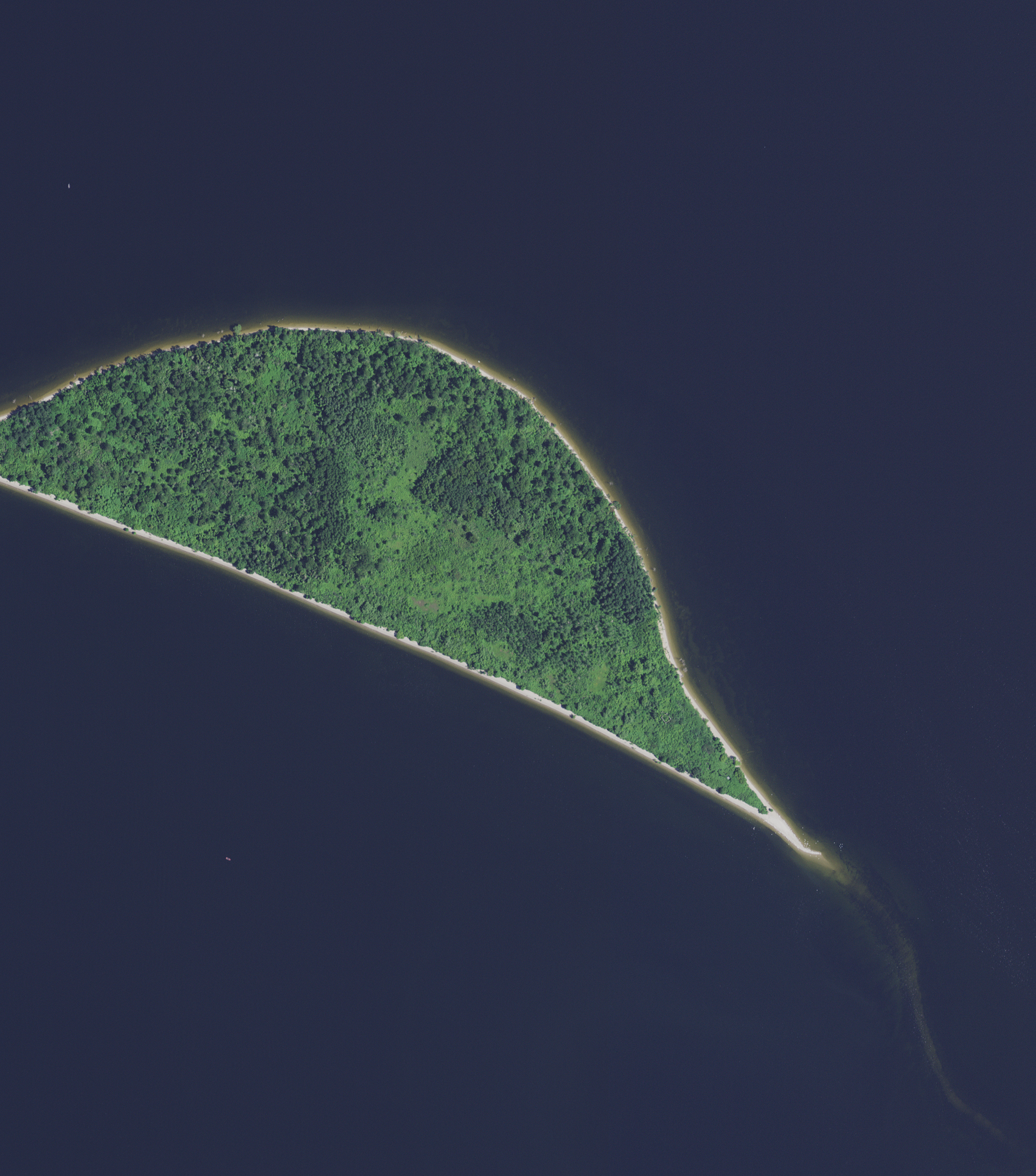
East end

=== Diagram ===
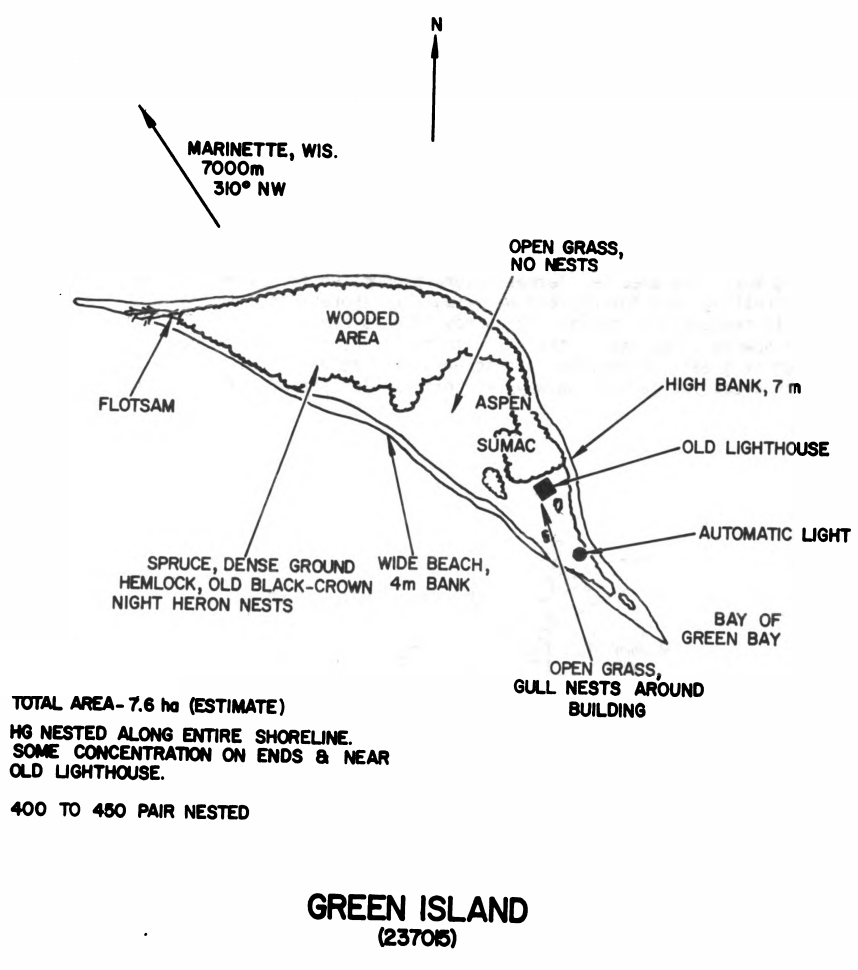
Green Island, drawn from observations made in 1975–1976.

== Climate ==
Green Island

Climate chart (precipitation, max. and min. temperature)
| J | F | M | A | M | J | J | A | S | O | N | D |
| 59 −10 −15 | 44 −7 −15 | 59 0 −8 | 81 14 −1 | 82 19 6 | 101 22 12 | 103 24 15 | 88 23 16 | 112 20 10 | 113 11 1 | 89 2 −2 | 59 −7 −10 |
- █ Average max. and min. temperatures in °C
- █ Precipitation totals in mm
Imperial conversion
| J | F | M | A | M | J | J | A | S | O | N | D |
| 2.3 14 5 | 1.7 19 5 | 2.3 32 18 | 3.2 57 30 | 3.2 66 43 | 4 72 54 | 4.1 75 59 | 3.5 73 61 | 4.4 68 50 | 4.4 52 34 | 3.5 36 28 | 2.3 19 14 |
- █ Average max. and min. temperatures in °F
- █ Precipitation totals in inches
