= Peshtigo Reef Light =

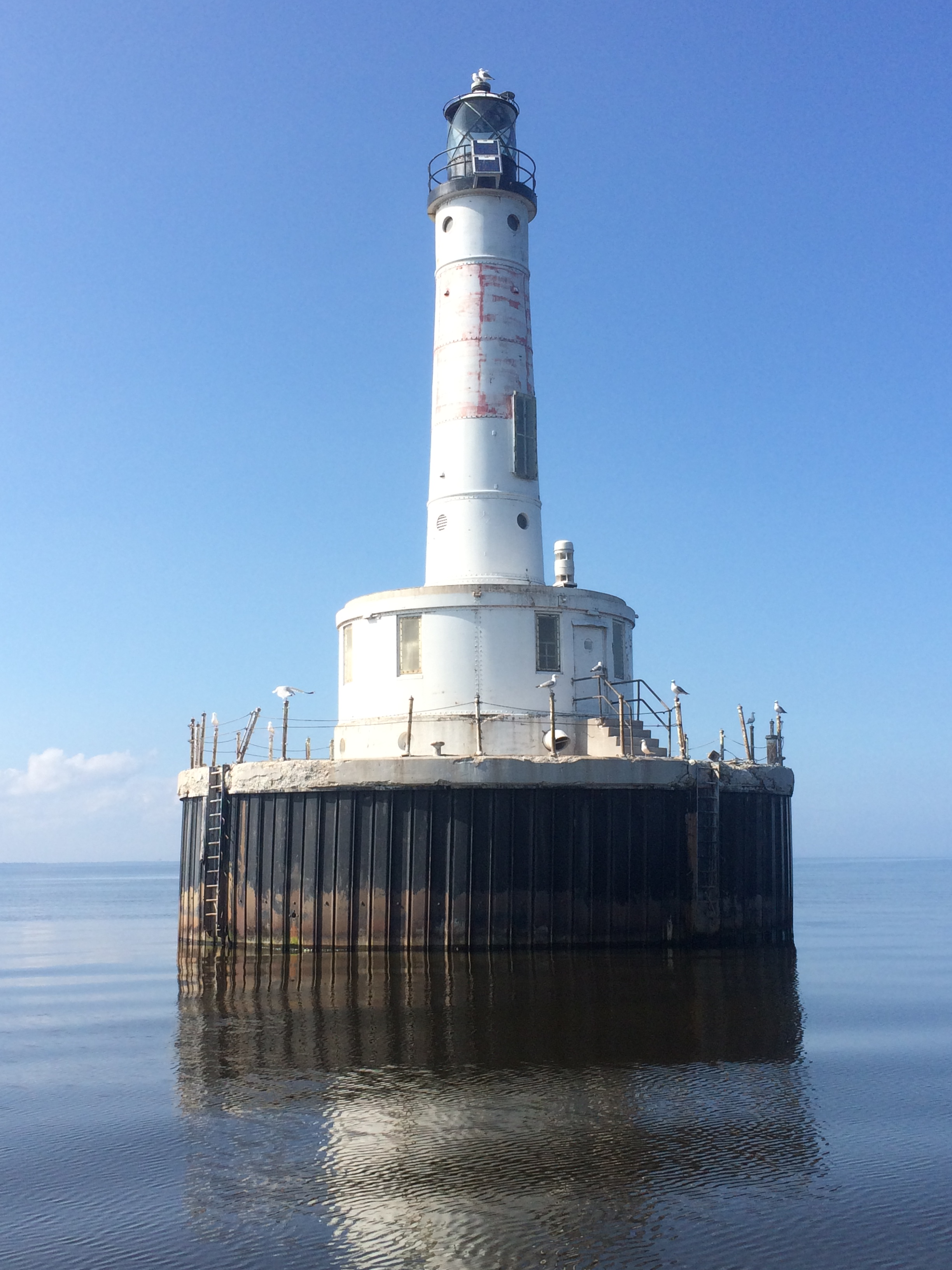
- Location: Green Bay off Peshtigo Point
- Coordinates: 44°57′23.87″N 87°34′44.82″W

Tower
- Constructed: 1905
- Foundation: Concrete pier
- Construction: Steel
- Shape: Cylindrical tower
- Markings: White w/red band
- Heritage: National Register of Historic Places listed place
- Fog signal: horn

Light
- First lit: 1936
- Focal height: 72 feet (22 m)
- Range: 9 nautical miles (17 km; 10 mi)
- Characteristic: Fl W 6s
- Peshtigo Reef Light
- U.S. National Register of Historic Places
- Location: Offshore in lower Green Bay, approx. 3.3 mi. SE of Peshtigo Point
- NRHP reference No.: 07000404
- Added to NRHP: May 2, 2007

The Peshtigo Reef Light is a lighthouse in Marinette County, Wisconsin, United States, offshore in lower Green Bay. Constructed in 1936 to replace a lightship, it remains in service.

== History ==
Peshtigo Reef juts out some four miles from the point, a significant hazard to navigation in the area. The hazard was addressed in an 1866 appropriation which provided for the construction of a daymark on this shoal as well as for the Chambers Island Light. The daymark was erected the following year and consisted of a skeleton tower standing on a wooden crib.

The Lighthouse Board began to consider replacement of the mark in the 1890s as the old mark was considered unreliable. Establishment of a buoy and of a lighthouse were rejected due to the ice in the winter; eventually, in 1898, the board requested that a lightship be constructed for the spot. This request was finally honored by Congress in 1902, and 1905 Lightship No. 77 was delivered to the station at Sturgeon Bay; it took up station in April of the following year.

The lightship was not an ideal solution; in particular, it had to be withdrawn each fall due to ice. Coal traffic was heavy, and it was felt that a permanent fixed light would mark the shoal more effectively. Therefore, in 1936 a lighthouse was set on the spot. This light is of similar construction to the Green Bay Harbor Entrance Light to the south. A wooden crib was first set on the bottom, and a ring of steel plates was set on it in a circle. This steel ring became the outer form for the foundation, which was poured in concrete on the spot. The basement thus formed housed the generator and oil storage which powered the light. A temporary light was erected on this foundation, thus allowing the departure of the lightship; then work began on the superstructure. This consisted of a cylindrical house twenty-five feet across and divided into two rooms to provide temporary living quarters for servicing personnel. The tower proper stood on its roof, topped by the lantern. All of the superstructure was initially painted white except for the lantern, which was black. A fourth order Fresnel lens was provided. The initial fog signal was a diesel-powered diaphragmatic horn, supplemented by a bell.

This light was never permanently manned; the living quarters were provided in case those servicing the light were unable to immediately return to the mainland. The light was serviced by the staff of the Sherwood Point Light on the opposite shore of the bay, who also controlled the fog signal through a radio link. Eventually a submarine cable was run to the light, and the generators were removed. A red band was also applied to the light as a daymark.

The light is in service. It was added to the National Register of Historic Places in 2007.
