= Green Bay Harbor Entrance Light =

Lighthouse in Wisconsin, United States

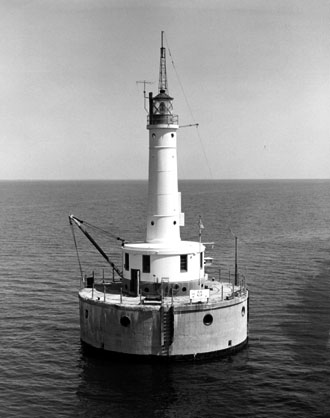
- Green Bay Harbor Entrance Light (USCG)
- Location: approaches to Green Bay, Wisconsin harbor
- Coordinates: 44°39′11.13″N 87°54′4.54″W

Tower
- Constructed: 1935
- Foundation: Concrete pier
- Construction: Steel plate
- Automated: 1979
- Shape: white conical tower on cylindrical base
- Heritage: National Register of Historic Places listed place

Light
- Focal height: 72 feet (22 m)
- Lens: fourth order Fresnel lens
- Range: 12 nautical miles (22 km; 14 mi)
- Characteristic: occ. red 4s

The Green Bay Harbor Entrance Light is an offshore lighthouse near Green Bay, Wisconsin. Located 10 miles (16 km) from the mouth of the Fox River, it was erected to signal the entrance to Green Bay.

The shipping channel approaching the Fox River in Green Bay was changed a number of times in order to accommodate vessels of increasing draft. The Army Corps of Engineers also modified the channel in the mid 1920s. The Green Bay Harbor Entrance buoy was established in 1927 to mark this point until the Bureau of Lighthouses could obtain funds for a more permanent solution. The acetylene buoy emitted a flash of 0.3 seconds duration every 3 seconds and had a wave-activated bell. The light is one of the few on the Great Lakes still powered by submarine cable. It is issued from a pair of 300 mm Tideland Signal ML300 acrylic optics mounted on the gallery railing. Because the light is too far out to be seen well from shore, the only good view of it is from a boat.

== Construction ==
The light, situated about 9 miles (14 km) from the Fox River, marks the west side of the entrance that leads to the city of Green Bay on the north side of the dredged shipping channel. Federal funds were allocated in 1934 to replace the aging Peshtigo Reef Light with the Green Bay Harbor Entrance Light. The work of constructing the light was started in 1935.

It used a similar design as that of the Peshtigo Reef Light to the north: a cylindrical foundation containing several chambers was poured inside a steel form atop an octagonal timber crib that had been towed to the offshore site), and a steel plate superstructure was set atop it. This consisted of a single-story round dwelling floor surmounted by a thin conical tower. Atop this base, steel forms were assembled to create a concrete circular wall to a height of 70 feet (21 m). This circular wall was three feet thick, inside of which a heavy timber crib was constructed. In the afternoon of June 5, 1935, the pier was towed into Green Bay and placed into position in 24 feet (7.3 m)-deep water. The crib was filled to just below the waterline with 5000 tons of crushed stone brought from Port Inland, Michigan. A reinforced concrete slab two-feet-six-inches thick was added on top of that and a concrete bunker for the machinery was constructed.

The lantern initially contained a fourth order Fresnel lens giving a red light; a short mast on the roof of the lantern bore a radio beacon antenna. The fog signal was a horn powered by compressed air. The light was activated in 1935.

== History ==
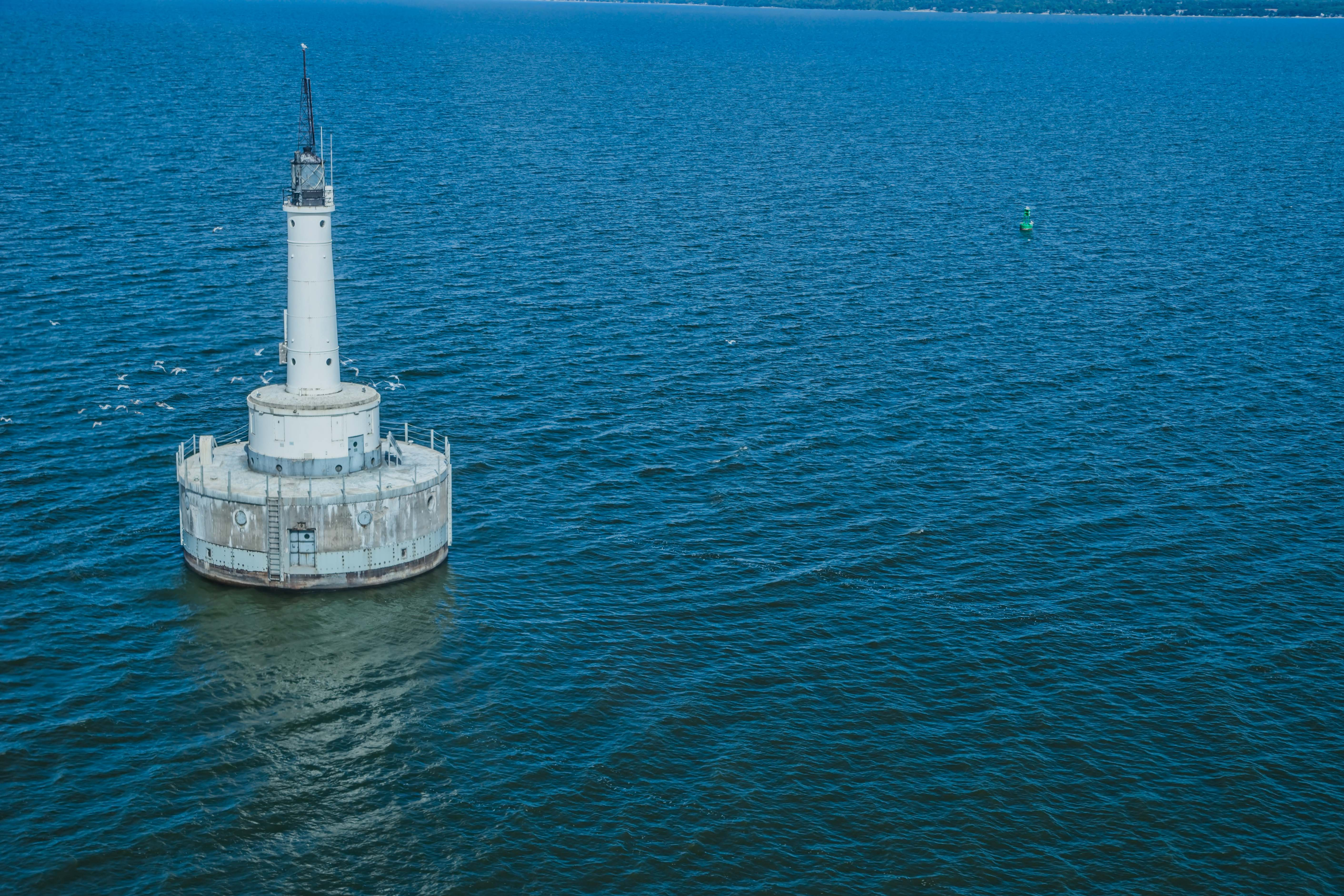
View of the Green Bay Harbor Entrance Light from a helicopter.

Unlike its sister, which was intended for emergency use only, this light was constantly staffed by Coast Guard personnel, after the Coast Guard took charge of the lighthouses in the United States in 1939, who served two-week rotating tours. These keepers lived in the circular portion of the lighthouse. The dwelling encompassed not only the superstructure, but also part of the foundation, as shown by the ring of portholes in its side.

The light was automated in 1979. Today, the lighthouse displays an occulting red light with a four-second period, having a nominal range of 12 nautical miles. During the navigation season that runs from April 1 to November 1, the fog signal sounds a two-second blast every fifteen seconds.

== Keepers ==
Before the light was automated in 1979, people were in charge of the light on a continuous basis. The heads and first assistants of the light played a prominent role in carrying out the daily processes of the light.

=== Head ===
- Carl Witzmann (1936–1939)
- Theodore Grosskopf (1939–1945)
- William L. Hanson (1945–1946)
- William Matthews (at least 1963)

Joseph J. Vander Linden, BM1 (1977)

=== First assistant ===
- Andrew Weber (1935 – at least 1941)
- Henry J. Wierzbach (at least 1942)
- Gregory Navarre (1940–1949)
- William Goudreau (1940–1949)

=== USCG ===
- Clayton Locke (1945–1946)
- Glynn Butler (1953–1955)

== Dimensions ==
The circular portion of the lighthouse measures 50 feet (15 m) in diameter. The height of the tower is 72 feet (22 m) above the mean sea level.
