= Rockwell Light =

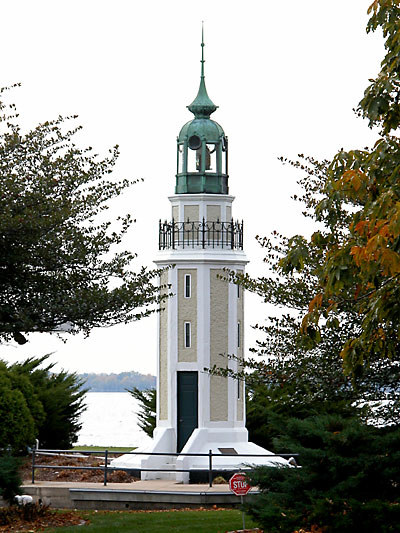
- Rockwell Lighthouse
- Location: Oshkosh, Wisconsin
- Coordinates: 44°00′25.4″N 88°31′11.3″W

Tower
- Constructed: 1910
- Construction: Concrete
- Height: 13 m (43 ft)
- Shape: Octagonal

Light
- First lit: 1910
- Deactivated: >1965
- Focal height: 26 ft (7.9 m)
- Characteristic: Fixed red

The Rockwell Light is located on the northern harbor area of Oshkosh, Wisconsin, in Winnebago County, Wisconsin.

== History ==
The lighthouse was thought up by William Bray as a way to mark his harbor as well as the entrance to the Fox River. In 1909 Bray found an architect who drew up the plans but he died in that year before he could carry through with the work. Bray had the lighthouse completed in 1910 which appeared on Light Lists for several decades. William Bray had paid for the lighthouse using his own funds. Later after commercial traffic picked up in the port the government realized the importance of the light so they paid some of its expenses. The lighthouse was sold in 1917 and changed hands several times before a restoration job was done the following year. In the 1920s the lighthouse was operated by the Cook & Brown Lime Company which shipped goods along the Fox River. The company owned the lighthouse until at least 1965, further future information is unavailable. At some point the lighthouse was deactivated as the structure no longer appears on the Coast Guard's official Light List.
