= Green Island Light (Wisconsin) =

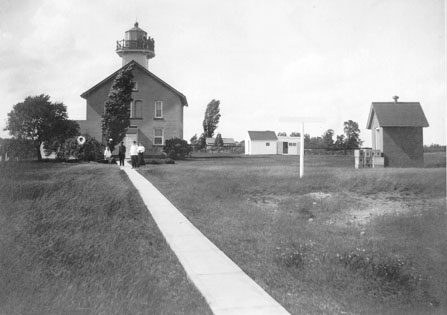
- Green Island Light in September 1914 (USCG)
- Location: Green Island in Green Bay
- Coordinates: 45.0564°N 87.4929°W

Tower
- Constructed: 1863
- Foundation: stone
- Construction: brick
- Automated: 1933
- Height: 48 feet (15 m)
- Shape: two story house with tower on roof

Light
- First lit: 1863
- Deactivated: 1956
- Focal height: 55 feet (17 m)
- Lens: fourth order Fresnel lens
- Range: 7 nmi (13 km; 8.1 mi)
- Characteristic: Fl W 6s

The Green Island Light is a lighthouse located on Green Island in Green Bay. Abandoned since its deactivation in 1956, it survives as a hollow shell near the existing skeleton tower.

== History ==
Calls for a lighthouse in the area were first heard in the 1850s, and in 1861 George Gordon Meade was sent to the area to investigate requests for lights on the island and on the shore north of the mouth of the Menominee River. He reported that a light on Green Island would be sufficient for both requests, and the light was constructed in 1862-1863. A two-story brick structure, it displayed a fixed light provided by a fourth order Fresnel lens. The first keeper was one Samuel Drew, who also happened to be the person from whom the land for the light station was purchased; he and his wife Mary remained at this station until 1881, when they transferred to the Menominee Pier Light. In addition to their official duties, they farmed much of the remainder of the island.

The year after activation, a severe fire in the lighthouse required erection of a temporary beacon and shelter during reconstruction of the light. The Drews had five children on the island, two of whom were destined to become lighthouse keepers themselves; a third died on the island in infancy and is buried there.

1871 is remembered in the Green Bay area as the year of the Great Peshtigo Fire; the island escaped the conflagration, but the smoke was so thick that Samuel Drew kept the light burning during daylight as well as at night. Nevertheless, the three-masted schooner George L. Newman was wrecked offshore, but the crew was rescued without loss.

1876 saw the first of several changes to the docking facilities, as an additional plot was purchased from the Drews and a new landing was constructed. In 1883 the boathouse was moved due to dropping water levels in the bay. This house was damaged by ice in 1902 and had to be rebuilt. In the meantime the well went dry in 1893 and had to be redug.

Frank Drew became assistant keeper in 1902, transferring from the Port des Morts Island Light. The son of Samuel and Mary Drew, he was joined by his brother George after Frank became head keeper in 1909. Frank and his brother gained a reputation for heroism, with over thirty rescues credited to them over the years. In 1928 the beacon was changed to a new flashing signal with a reduced range; this lamp, however, was able to be operated in the winter months. Frank Drew retired in 1929 and died in 1931; in 1998 a USCG coastal buoy tender, USCGC Frank Drew (WLM-557), was christened in his honor.

The light was automated in 1933, and in 1956 a new steel tower was erected and the old house abandoned. The following year the light station was sold to the Roen Steamship Company, which had already purchased the rest of the island in 1955. Vandalism, fires and weather have reduced the original site to an empty shell, but the 1956 tower remains active.
