= Milwaukee Breakwater Light =

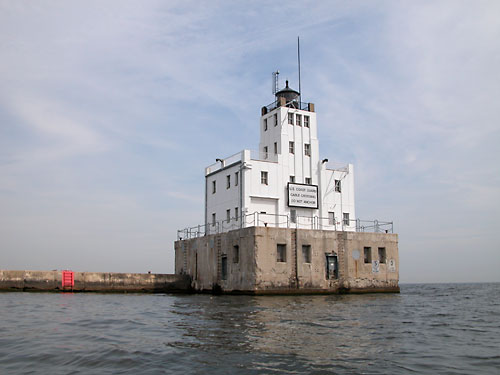
- Location: Milwaukee, Wisconsin
- Coordinates: 43°01′37.24″N 87°52′55.14″W

Tower
- Constructed: 1926
- Foundation: Concrete
- Construction: 1/4 inch (6.4 mm) steel plate, steel frame, cast iron lantern
- Automated: 1966
- Height: 53 feet (16 m)
- Shape: Square on square house, topped by round lantern
- Markings: white with black lantern & parapet
- Heritage: National Register of Historic Places listed place, listed in the Wisconsin State Register of Historic Places
- Fog signal: HORN: 2 blasts ev 20s (2s bl- 2s si-2s bl-14s si). Operates from Apr. 1 to Nov.

Light
- First lit: 1926
- Focal height: 67 feet (20 m)
- Lens: Fourth order Fresnel
- Range: 14 nautical miles (26 km; 16 mi)
- Characteristic: Fl R 10 seconds
- Milwaukee Breakwater Light
- U.S. National Register of Historic Places
- Location: South end of north breakwater, .7 miles east of the mouth of the Milwaukee River
- MPS: Light Stations of the United States MPS
- NRHP reference No.: 11000678
- Added to NRHP: September 16, 2011

The Milwaukee Breakwater lighthouse was built in 1926 in the harbor of Milwaukee in Milwaukee County, Wisconsin to mark the entrance to the harbor. One of the last fully enclosed breakwater lighthouses in the Great Lakes, the structure was placed on the National Register of Historic Places in 2011.

== History ==
This lighthouse, owned and operated by the United States Coast Guard, is an active aid to navigation. The steel tower has a square Balcony and "round cast iron lantern room [that] features helical astragals" in the lantern. The two-story steel lighthouse keeper's quarters are in the art deco style. The structure rests on a 60 by 54 feet (18 by 16 m) concrete pier, which rises more than 20 feet (6.1 m) above the lake's surface. The tower rests 14 feet (4.3 m) above the second floor and is 53 feet (16 m) tall overall. The red light has a focal plane of 67 feet (20 m) feet above Lake Michigan. The lantern and parapet are painted black.

The structure is near the middle of the four-mile-long Milwaukee breakwater. It is built to withstand heavy weather and waves when Lake Michigan becomes roughest. The building is made of 1/4 inch (6.4 mm) "steel plates over a steel skeletal frame, and is equipped with windows and portholes with glass a full half inch in thickness." The structure was originally painted red, but became white thereafter.

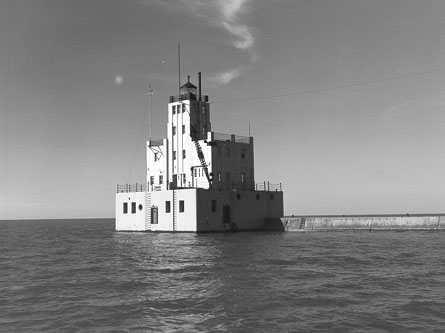
USCG archive photo

In 1926, the original fourth order Fresnel lens was transferred from the Milwaukee Pierhead Light. The "helical barred lantern is also thought to have come from the pierhead light". The lens was removed in 1994, and is now an exhibit in Manitowoc at the Wisconsin Maritime Museum.

The resident lighthouse keepers serviced not only this light, but all of the lights in the harbor, however boat launching and landing from this structure was especially risky. A list of keepers is available.

In June 2011 the United States Coast Guard declared that they no longer need the lighthouse, and that they will transfer it to eligible organizations, or if none are found, auction it. In 2013, Optima Enrichment acquired the lighthouse from the Coast Guard and is currently raising funds in order to open the lighthouse to the public.

== Access ==
The lighthouse is situated on the north side of the harbor at the end of the breakwater. Because the shore and breakwater are disconnected, it is necessary to use a boat to reach it. The best view is from the parking lot at the end of East Erie Street, adjacent to the Milwaukee Pierhead Light. Those who are interested in photographing it will need a telephoto or zoom lens. The tower and site are closed.
