= Manitowoc Breakwater Light =

- Manitowoc Breakwater Lighthouse
- Location: Manitowoc, Wisconsin
- Coordinates: 44°05′33.918″N 87°38′36.91″W

Tower
- Constructed: 1918
- Foundation: Pier
- Construction: Steel
- Automated: 1971
- Height: 40 feet (12 m)
- Shape: Cylindrical on square fog signaling building

Light
- First lit: 1918
- Focal height: 16 m (52 ft)
- Lens: Fourth order Fresnel lens
- Range: 13 nautical miles (24 km; 15 mi)
- Characteristic: White, Isophase, 6 sec

The Manitowoc Breakwater Light is a Lake Michigan lighthouse located near Manitowoc in Manitowoc County, Wisconsin, at the end of the north pier defining Manitowoc's harbor.

It is not to be confused with the smaller and complementary south pier navigational beacon, which was unmoored and swept out into the lake on January 7, 2019, during a period of heavy waves and lakeshore flooding from gusty winds.

== Images ==
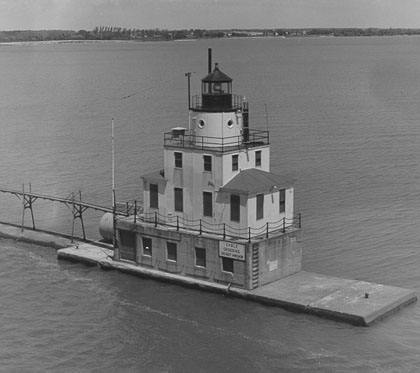

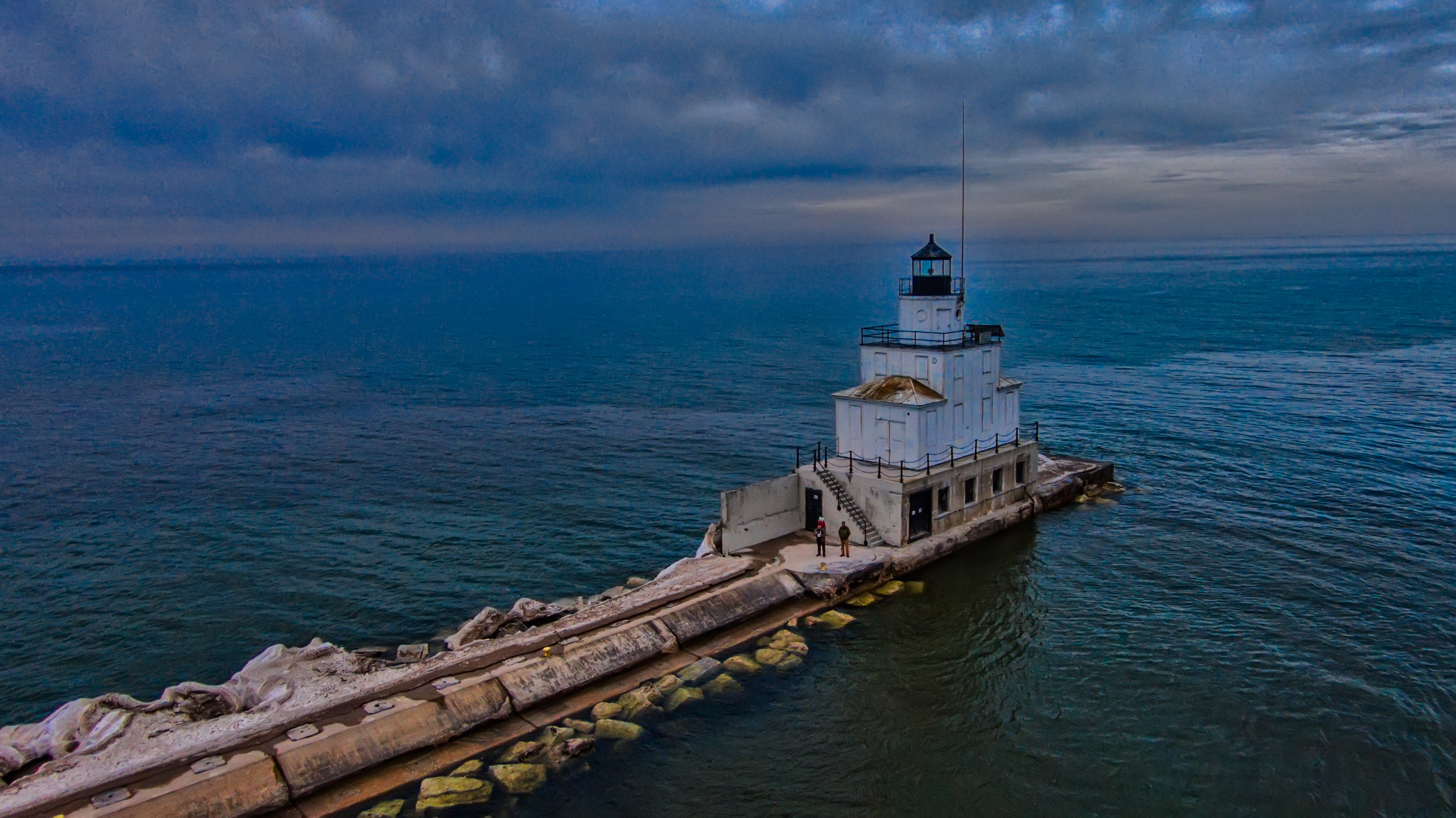
