= Milwaukee Pierhead Light =

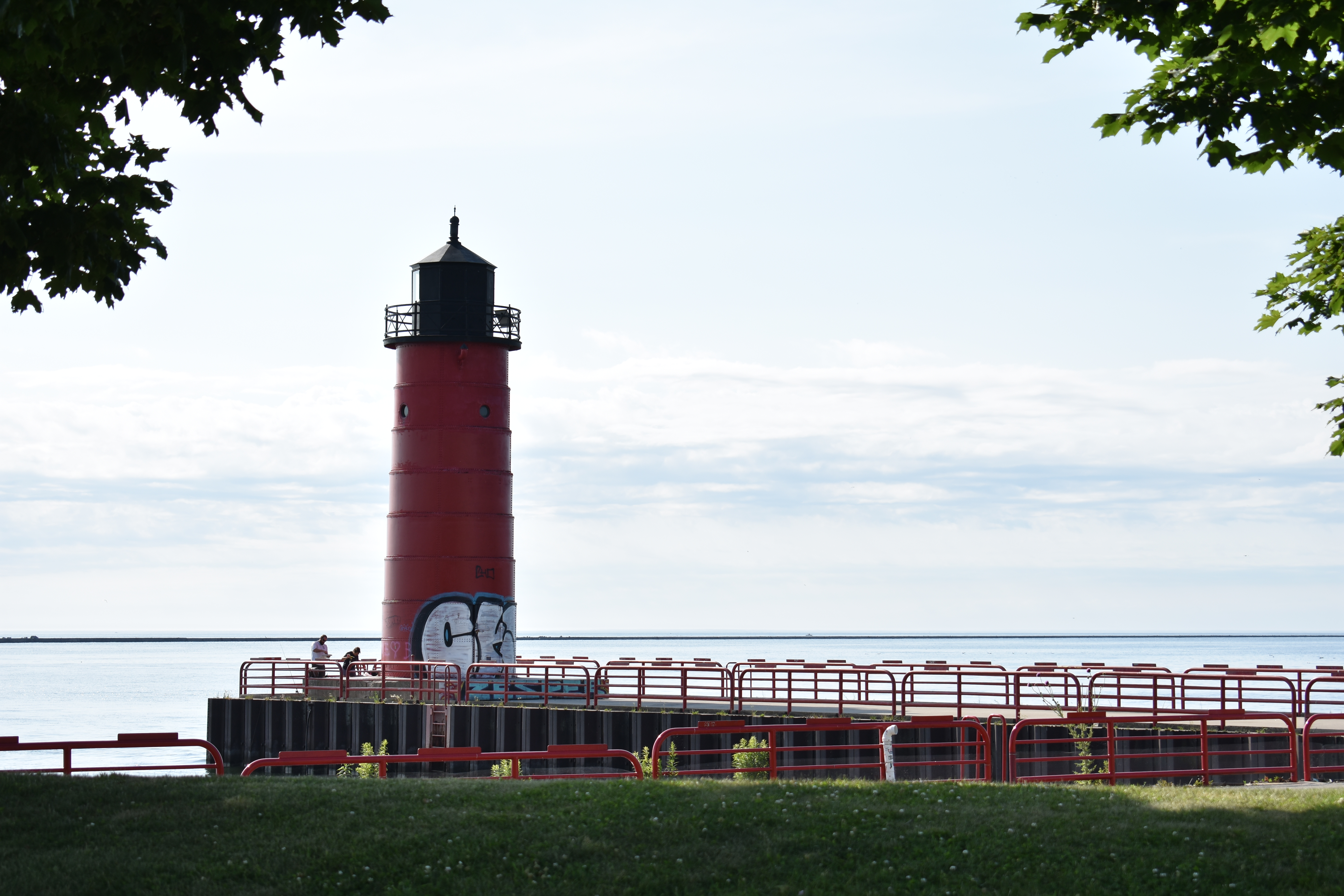
- Milwaukee Pierhead Light in 2026
- Location: Milwaukee, Wisconsin
- Coordinates: 43°01′33.378″N 87°53′42.938″W

Tower
- Constructed: 1872
- Foundation: concrete pier
- Construction: Steel
- Automated: circa 1939
- Height: 41 feet (12 m)
- Shape: Frustum of a cone, decagonal lantern room
- Markings: Red with black lantern and parapet
- Heritage: National Register of Historic Places listed place

Light
- First lit: 1872
- Focal height: 43 feet (13 m)
- Lens: Fourth-order Fresnel lens (original), unknown "modern beacon" (current)
- Range: 7 nautical miles (13 km; 8.1 mi)
- Characteristic: White flashing light every 4 seconds
- Milwaukee Pierhead Light
- U.S. National Register of Historic Places
- Location: Milwaukee, Wisconsin
- Area: less than one acre
- NRHP reference No.: 12000971
- Added to NRHP: November 2012

The Milwaukee Pierhead Light is an active lighthouse located in the Milwaukee harbor, just south of downtown. This aid to navigation is a 'sister' of the Kenosha North Pier Light.

== History ==
The station was established in 1872. It is west of the Milwaukee Breakwater Light, and is near the outflow of the Milwaukee River—not far east of where that river converged with the Kinnickinnic River—into the Milwaukee Harbor and Lake Michigan.

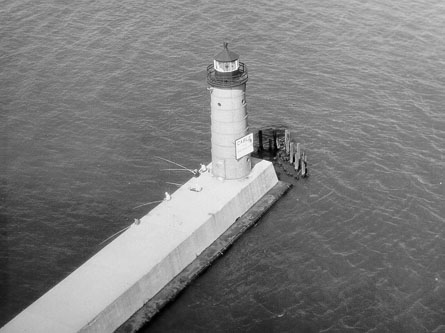
USCG archive photo

This light has a round steel tower with a round gallery and a ten-sided lantern. In 1926, the original 4th Order Fresnel lens was transferred to the Milwaukee Breakwater Light, and that lens is now displayed at the Wisconsin Maritime Museum in Manitowoc, Wisconsin. The Fifth Order Fresnel lens—installed in 1926—was removed in 2005. The tower is newly painted circa 2007. The 5th Order lens is said to be on display also at the Wisconsin Maritime Museum.

According to one source: "The original lantern room had helical bar windows and is believed to [be] the one presently on the Breakwater Light." This is corroborated by the report that the Breakwater Light has a "round cast iron lantern room [that] features helical astragal" in the lantern.

A Submarine cable runs from this light to the Milwaukee Breakwater Light, upon which a lighted danger warning is displayed.

The light was recently painted, circa 2007.

From 1872 until 1926, the light had its own keepers. Thereafter, this light, like all of the lights in the harbor, was serviced by the resident Lighthouse keepers who were stationed at the neighboring North Point Light Station until it was automated.

The light was listed on the National Register of Historic Places in November 2012.

== Directions ==
The light is located in downtown Milwaukee, at the end of East Erie Street, which leads to a short pier. Parking is available. The pier may be walked, but the tower is closed.

I-43 to east I-794. Take exit(1F)(Lincoln Memorial Drive), proceed north to Michigan Street. Turn right onto Michigan. Turn right onto Harbor Drive and proceed under the interstate to Polk Street. Turn right on Polk, which ends at Erie Street. Turn left on Erie into the parking lot where it ends.
