= Asylum Light =

Lighthouse in Wisconsin, United States

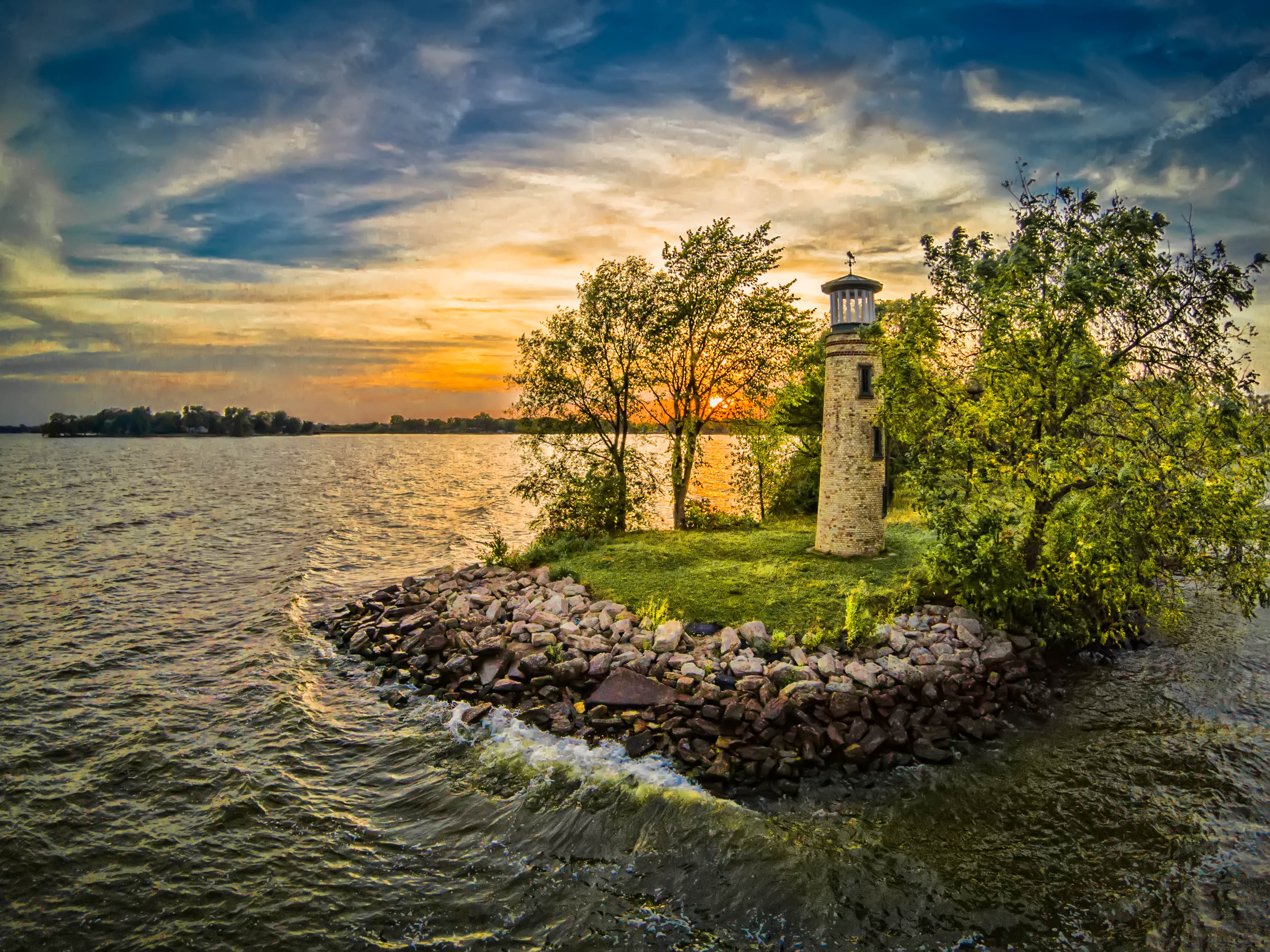
- Asylum Lighthouse
- Location: Winnebago County, United States
- Coordinates: 44°03′44.5″N 88°30′52.7″W

Tower
- Constructed: 1937
- Height: 9 m (30 ft)

Light
- Focal height: 15 m (49 ft)

The Asylum Light is located just north of Oshkosh, Wisconsin, in Winnebago County, Wisconsin. The lighthouse is located on a small island just a few feet away from the mainland in Asylum Bay on Lake Winnebago, Wisconsin. This lighthouse marks the separation between North and South Asylum Bays.

== History ==
In 1871, construction began on the Northern Asylum for the Insane which was later called the Winnebago Mental Health Institute. The former name stuck though hence the name of the point, and bay. The lighthouse wasn't built until 1937 as the result of a "Works Progress Administration project". The Department of Transportation soon rejected the lighthouse as a navigational light causing it never to be lit.

The lighthouse received $4,000 in structural repairs which were carried out in 2007. In the mid 1990s a bridge was rebuilt to the island which allowed access to the Island that the lighthouse is on. Since that time though it has deteriorated rendering the structure unsafe for crossing. Following the damage from a storm in 2019, a new bridge was constructed, allowing access to the island and the lighthouse again.
