= Peshtigo (town), Wisconsin =

Peshtigo
- Town
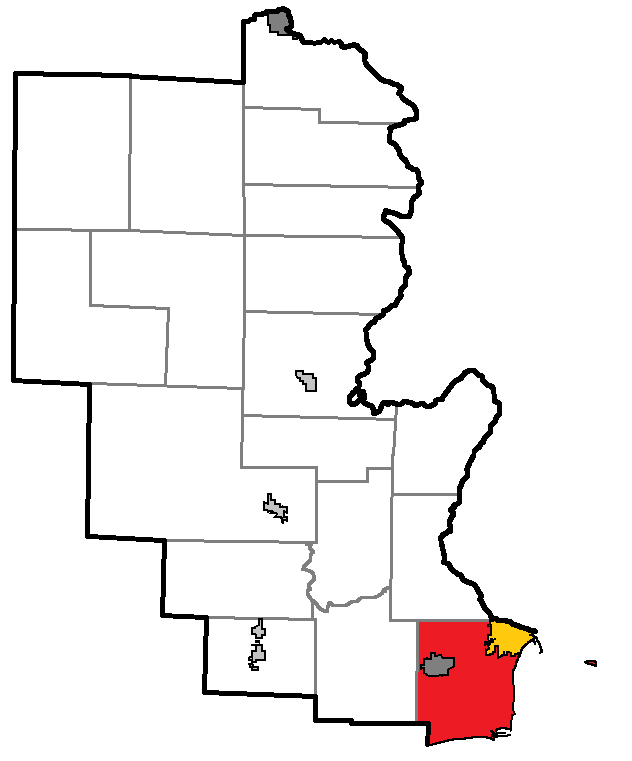
- Location of the Town of Peshtigo, within Marinette County
- Coordinates: 45°3′32″N 87°41′53″W
- Country: United States
- State: Wisconsin
- County: Marinette

Area
  - Total: 180.3 sq mi (467.0 km^{2})
  - Land: 59.3 sq mi (153.6 km^{2})
  - Water: 121.0 sq mi (313.3 km^{2})
- Elevation: 594 ft (181 m)

Population (2020)
  - Total: 4,006
  - Density: 67.55/sq mi (26.08/km^{2})
- Time zone: UTC-6 (Central (CST))
  - Summer (DST): UTC-5 (CDT)
- Area codes: 715 & 534
- FIPS code: 55-62200
- GNIS feature ID: 1583914
- Website: https://townofpeshtigo.wi.gov/

Peshtigo is a town located in Marinette County, Wisconsin, United States. The population was 4,006 at the 2020 census. The City of Peshtigo is located within the town. The historic Peshtigo Fire took place here.

== Geography ==
According to the United States Census Bureau, the town has a total area of 180.3 square miles (466.9 km^{2}), of which 59.3 square miles (153.6 km^{2}) is land and 121.0 square miles (313.3 km^{2}) (67.10%) is water. The town features the 5,700-acre (23 km^{2}) Peshtigo Harbor State Wildlife Area and the Bloch Oxbow State Natural Area on the lower Peshtigo River.

== History ==
The town of Peshtigo had a major fire on the same day, October 8, 1871, as the Great Chicago Fire.

== Demographics ==
Historical population
Census	Pop.	Note	%±
2000	3,819		—
2020	4,006		—
U.S. Decennial Census

As of the census of 2000, there were 3,819 people, 1,416 households, and 1,123 families residing in the town. The population density was 21.2 inhabitants per square mile (8.2/km^{2}). There were 1,567 housing units at an average density of 8.7 per square mile (3.4/km^{2}). The racial makeup of the town was 98.93% White, 0.13% Native American, 0.37% Asian, 0.10% from other races, and 0.47% from two or more races. 0.26% of the population were Hispanic or Latino of any race.

There were 1,416 households, out of which 33.9% had children under the age of 18 living with them, 72.6% were married couples living together, 4.6% had a female householder with no husband present, and 20.7% were non-families. 17.3% of all households were made up of individuals, and 6.5% had someone living alone who was 65 years of age or older. The average household size was 2.61 and the average family size was 2.94.

In the town, the population was spread out, with 23.4% under the age of 18, 6.3% from 18 to 24, 27.3% from 25 to 44, 28.5% from 45 to 64, and 14.6% who were 65 years of age or older. The median age was 41 years. For every 100 females, there were 100.2 males. For every 100 females age 18 and over, there were 99.7 males.

The median income for a household in the town was $50,792, and the median income for a family was $55,043. Males had a median income of $40,353 versus $24,088 for females. The per capita income for the town was $22,016. About 1.1% of families and 1.8% of the population were below the poverty line, including none of those under age 18 and 2.8% of those age 65 or over.
