= Long Tail Point Light =

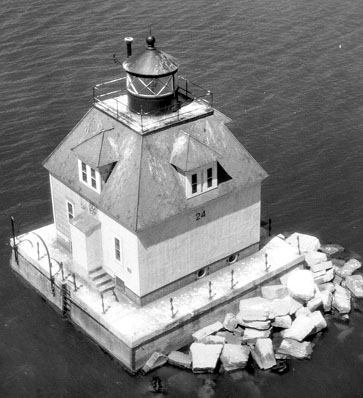
- The third light in the 1940s (USCG)
- Location: Southern end of Green Bay
- Coordinates: 44.5959°N 87.9835°W

Tower
- Construction: Fieldstone (first tower); Wood frame (second and third)
- Automated: 1936
- Shape: Conical tower (first); Square house with lantern on roof (second and third)

Light
- First lit: 1848 (first); 1859 (second); 1899 (third)
- Deactivated: 1973

The Long Tail Point Light, also known as the Tail Point Light, was a lighthouse in Green Bay, Wisconsin, USA. Long abandoned but still standing, it was succeeded by two further structures, both since destroyed.

== History ==
Long Tail Point is a sand bar lying at the southern end of the bay; as it lies adjacent to the channel into the city of Green Bay, a lighthouse was constructed in 1848. The structure was built from fieldstone collected at Bay Settlement on the opposite shore, and was originally lit with an array of oil lamps. These lamps were replaced with a Fresnel lens in the 1850s, but soon the light was surrounded by water, and it was abandoned in 1859 in favor of a new house a short distance to the north. The new lighthouse was an integral frame dwelling with the old lantern placed on its roof; it employed a fourth order Fresnel lens. In 1899 the light's distance from the newly dredged channel prompted the construction of a third light, this time on a concrete pier resting on a wooden crib offshore; the fog bell was moved to the Sand Point Light in Michigan. This new crib house was much smaller than the second house, and the keepers continued to live in the latter until automation of the light in 1936. A storm in 1973 washed this structure away and it was replaced by a skeleton tower.

The second house was sold to a private interest on the understanding that it would be moved; however, during the attempted relocation, the structure fell through the ice and was destroyed. The defunct first tower was given away in 1870, to be torn down. The tower's massive stone walls, however, defeated the new owner's attempts to destroy it, and the truncated tower still stands on the sandy spit.

== Diagram of the light's location on the sand bar ==
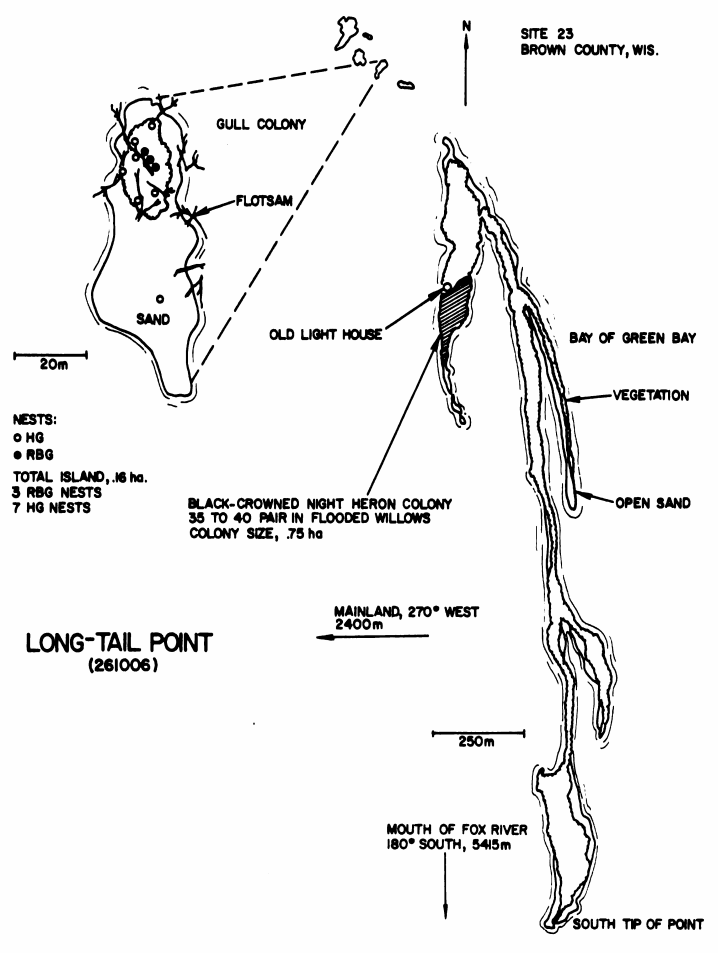
Diagram describing observations made in 1976.
