= Green Bay (Lake Michigan) =

Arm of Lake Michigan in Wisconsin and Michigan

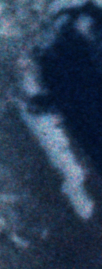
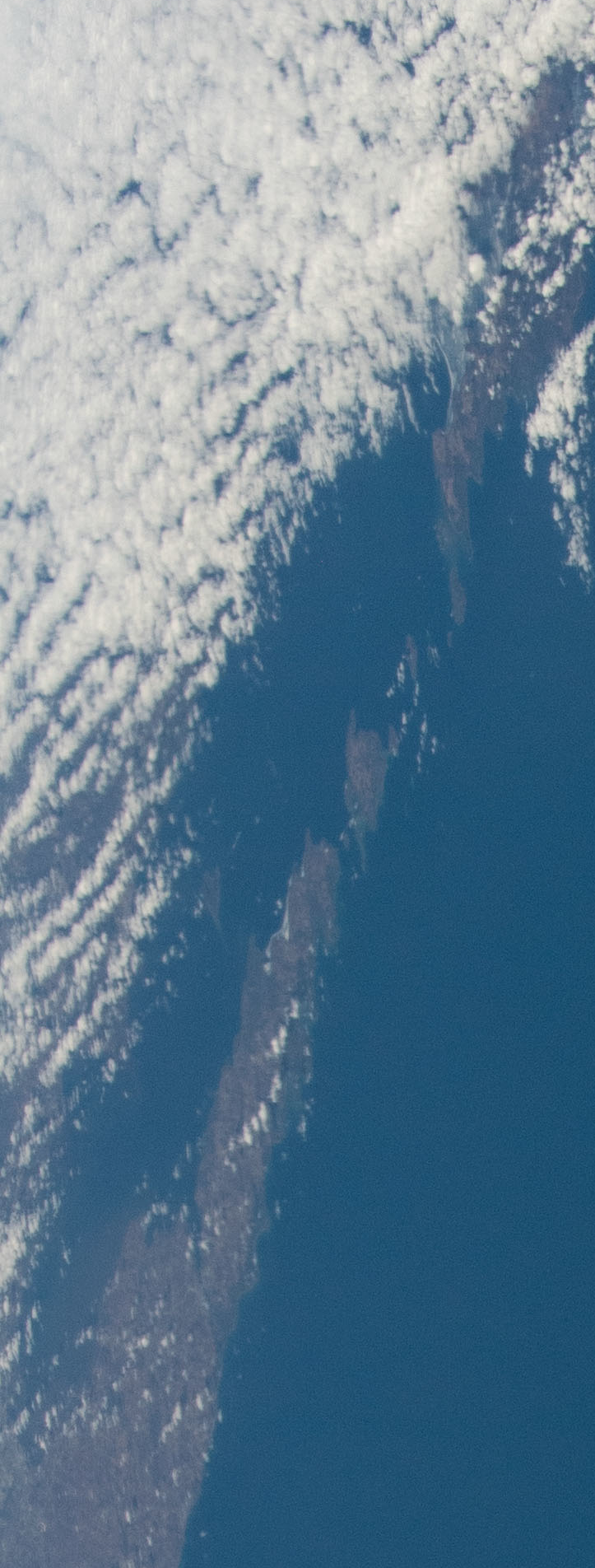
- On April 16, 1972, taken during Apollo 16 On April 14, 2022, from the International Space Station Astronaut photography of Green Bay

- Location within Michigan

- Green Bay
- Location: Brown County, Door County, Kewaunee County, Marinette County, Oconto County (Wisconsin), Delta County, Menominee County (Michigan)
- Coordinates: 45°01′47″N 87°27′39″W
- Type: Bay
- Surface elevation: 581 feet (177 m)

Green Bay is an arm of Lake Michigan, located along the south coast of Michigan's Upper Peninsula and the east coast of Wisconsin. It is separated from the rest of the lake by the Door Peninsula in Wisconsin, the Garden Peninsula in Michigan, and the chain of islands between them, all formed by the Niagara Escarpment. Green Bay is some 120 miles (193 km) long, with a width ranging from about 10 to 20 miles (16 to 32 km); it is 1,626 square miles (4,210 km^{2}) in area.

At the southern end of the bay is the city of Green Bay, Wisconsin, where the Fox River enters the bay. The Leo Frigo Memorial Bridge (formerly known as the Tower Drive bridge) spans the point where the bay begins and the Fox River ends, as the river flows south to north into the bay. Around mid-bay are Sturgeon Bay and the Peshtigo River. The Sturgeon Bay serves the city named after the bay as a shortcut for large ships to use to bypass the Door Peninsula, while the Peshtigo River serves Peshtigo and Crivitz. Locally, the bay is called the Bay of Green Bay to distinguish it from the city.

The bay is located in parts of five counties in Wisconsin (Brown, Door, Kewaunee, Marinette, Oconto), and two in Michigan (Delta, Menominee).

== History ==
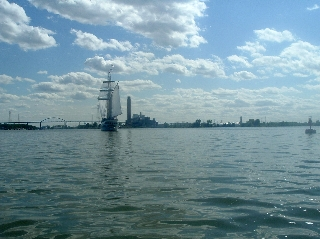
A tall ship sailing into the mouth of the Fox River

Oconto is home to Copper Culture State Park, which has remains dated to around 5000-6000 BC. It is a burial ground of the Copper Culture Indians. This burial ground is considered to be the oldest cemetery in Wisconsin and one of the oldest in the nation. The Ho-Chunk believe that they were created on the shores of Green Bay at a place called Red Banks.

The French Jesuit, Roman Catholic priest, and missionary, Father Claude-Jean Allouez said the first Mass in Oconto on December 3, 1669.

The bay was named la baie des Puants (literally, "the bay of the Stinks") by the French explorer Jean Nicolet as shown on many French maps of the 17th and 18th centuries. According to George R. Stewart, the French received the name from their Indian guides, who called the Ho-Chunk living near Green Bay by a derogatory word meaning "Stinkers", thus the bay was the "Bay of the Stinkers". This name perplexed the French, and Jacques Marquette thought the name might relate to the smell of the swamps when he explored the area in May 1673. His fellow explorer Louis Joliet, with two canoes and five voyageurs of French-Indian ancestry (Métis) were on their way to find the Mississippi River. They travelled up the Fox River, nearly to its headwaters. The French also called the bay Baie Verte, and the English kept this name as Green Bay. The name of the bay in the Menominee language is Pūcīhkit, or "bay that smells like something rotting".

In 1671 and 1673, Louis André and Jacques Marquette described fluctuations in the water level of the bay and discussed what they thought caused them.

== Geology and Ecology ==
Ferromanganese nodules have been found in the bay. Todorokite occurs within the nodules.

There are numerous reefs of exposed bedrock in the Porte des Mortes passage and in the bay.

North of the peninsula, warm water from Green Bay flows into Lake Michigan on the surface, while at the same time, cold lakewater enters Green Bay deep underneath.

In a study looking at fish stomach contents, lake whitefish and yellow perch were found to make up 5-6% of the diet of walleye in the bay. However, south of Chambers Island, walleye eat considerably more lake whitefish in May and June. Walleye were found to eat more yellow perch on an annual basis, but not more than 15% of their overall diet during any particular month.

Walleye and Lake whitefish in Green Bay for the most part do not compete for the same prey, especially south of Chambers Island. Lake whitefish and yellow perch in the bay compete strongly for the same prey south of Chambers Island, and compete moderately north of it.

== Environmental concerns ==
=== Areas of concern ===
According to the Environmental Protection Agency, "Areas of Concern are designated by the International Joint Commission as geographic areas in the Great Lakes basin having severe environmental degradation. There are 43 Areas of Concern with 26 in the United States, 17 in Canada, and five shared by the two countries."

=== Background ===
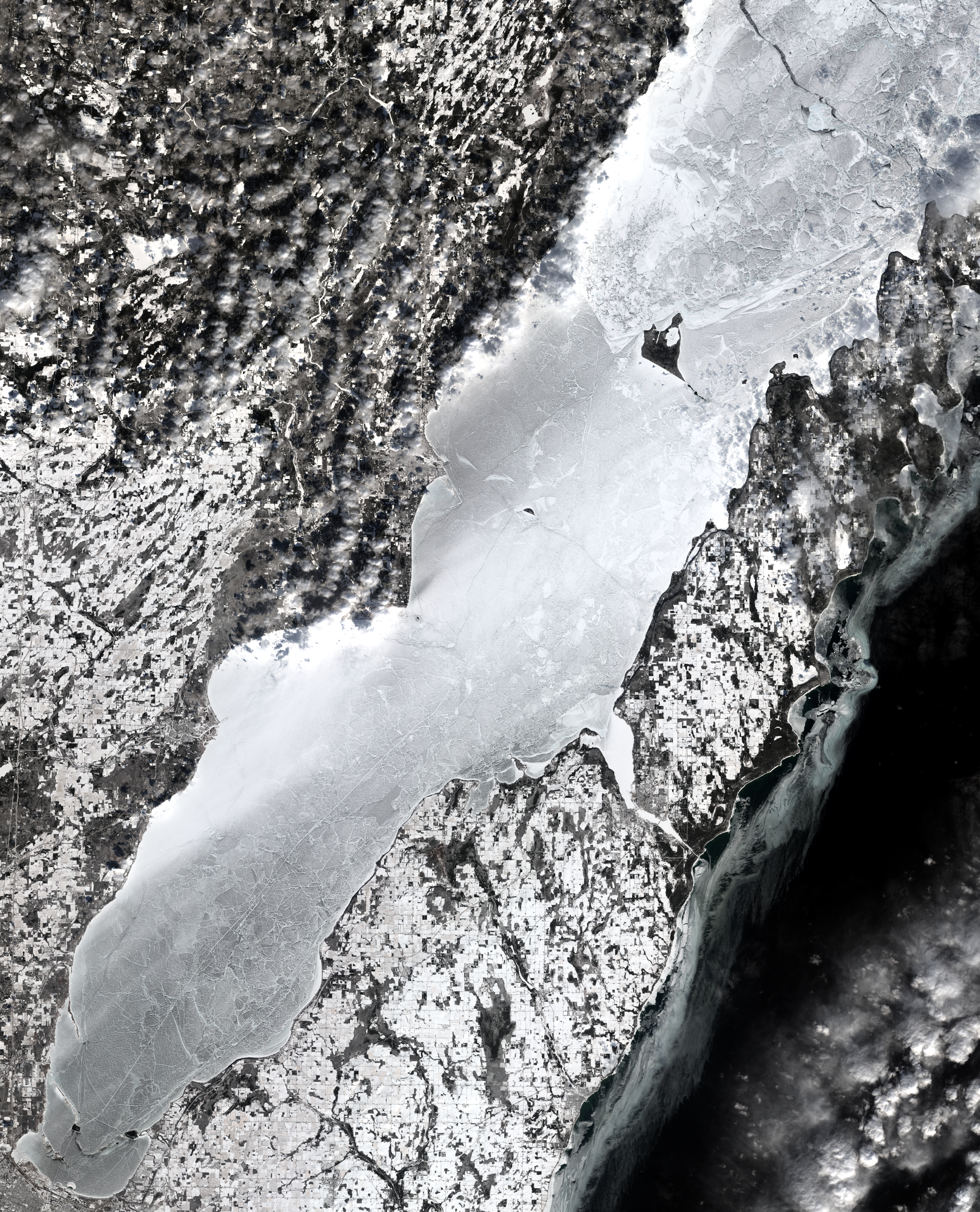
Although the lower and upper parts of the bay are separated by Chambers Island (upper right), the northeastern edge of the area of concern ends much lower into the bay at Long Tail Point (lower left). Taken by Landsat 8 on February 25, 2022.

Lower green Bay Area of Concern was designated in 1987 under the Great Lakes Water Quality agreement.

It was designated by these sources of pollution:

- Affected by runoff pollution from urban and rural areas, municipal and industrial wastewater discharges and degraded habitats.
- Industrialization was a major factor in this becoming contaminated
- High turbidity, sedimentation, fluctuating dissolved oxygen, frequent algal blooms, degraded fish/wildlife/plant populations and adverse toxicant impacts.
- This AOC is a shallow environment that has a rapid recycling system which also contributes to water quality issues

The seasonal dead zone in the lower part of the bay may have gotten longer from 2009 to 2015.

==== Beneficial Use Impairments ====
Beneficial Use Impairments (BUI) are a change in the chemical, physical or biological integrity of the Great Lakes system sufficient to cause significant environmental degradation. The International Joint Commission identified 14 BUIs listed below. All BUIs that have been designated for an AOC, must be removed for the AOC to be considered restored and begin the delisting process.

Green Bay BUI's:

- Restrictions on fish and wildlife consumption
- Tainting of fish and wildlife flavor
- Degradation of fish and wildlife populations
- Fish tumors or other deformities
- Degradation of aesthetics
- Restriction on dredging activities
- Loss of fish and wildlife habitat
- Bird/animal deformities or reproductive problems
- Excess of nutrients from pollutants
- Restrictions on drinking water consumption, or taste and odor
- Beach closings
- Degradation of microorganism populations

==== Timeline of restoration ====
Since 1988 over three quarters of the 120 remedial actions recommended by the Lower Green Bay remedial action plan have been implemented or initiated.

Industrialization was a major factor regarding the Lower Green Bay becoming contaminated; significant contributors were land water use (agriculture, logging, industry), high turbidity, sedimentation, frequent algal blooms, degraded fish/wildlife/plant populations and adverse toxicant impacts.

- 1988: First stage of action plan is released
- 1993: Update to action plan, current progress is released and future goals are identified
- 2003: USFWS releases an environmental assessment and restoration plan for the AOC
- 2003-2008: E.Coli measured consistently on beaches, shows overall health is good, but more projects needed to delist
- 2009: Wisconsin DNR identifies delisting targets for each of the BUI's
- 2010-2011: Laws passed to reduce/ban phosphorus in household materials, reduce phosphorus runoff from farms, and set new water quality standards.
- 2011: Stage 2 action plan update is released, describing key actions taken since 199, and identified future projects associated with the different BUI's
- 2012: Update action plan, US army Corps of Engineers begins Cat Island restoration project, and 360,000 cubic yards of PCB-contaminated sediments are dredged
- 2013: UofW extension released fact sheet of BUIs status in the AOC, judge rules that all companies EPA considers responsible for PCB contamination must complete the required cleanup work

==== Cleanup ====
Past Emergency Clean Up: In 1999 and 2000, EPA oversaw a dredging project done by some of the paper companies about 3 miles upstream from the mouth of the Lower Fox River. It removed 80,000 cubic yards of PCB-contaminated sediment, containing 3,400 pounds of PCBs.

2019 marks the 16th year of clean up of the lower Green Bay. River clean up is scheduled for late March depending on ice conditions. Monitoring will continue to study fish, water, and PCB concentrations. Once the lower Green Bay clean up is complete long term monitoring will still be done on the entirety of the river.

== Gallery ==
From Resourcesat-2 on October 31, 2021

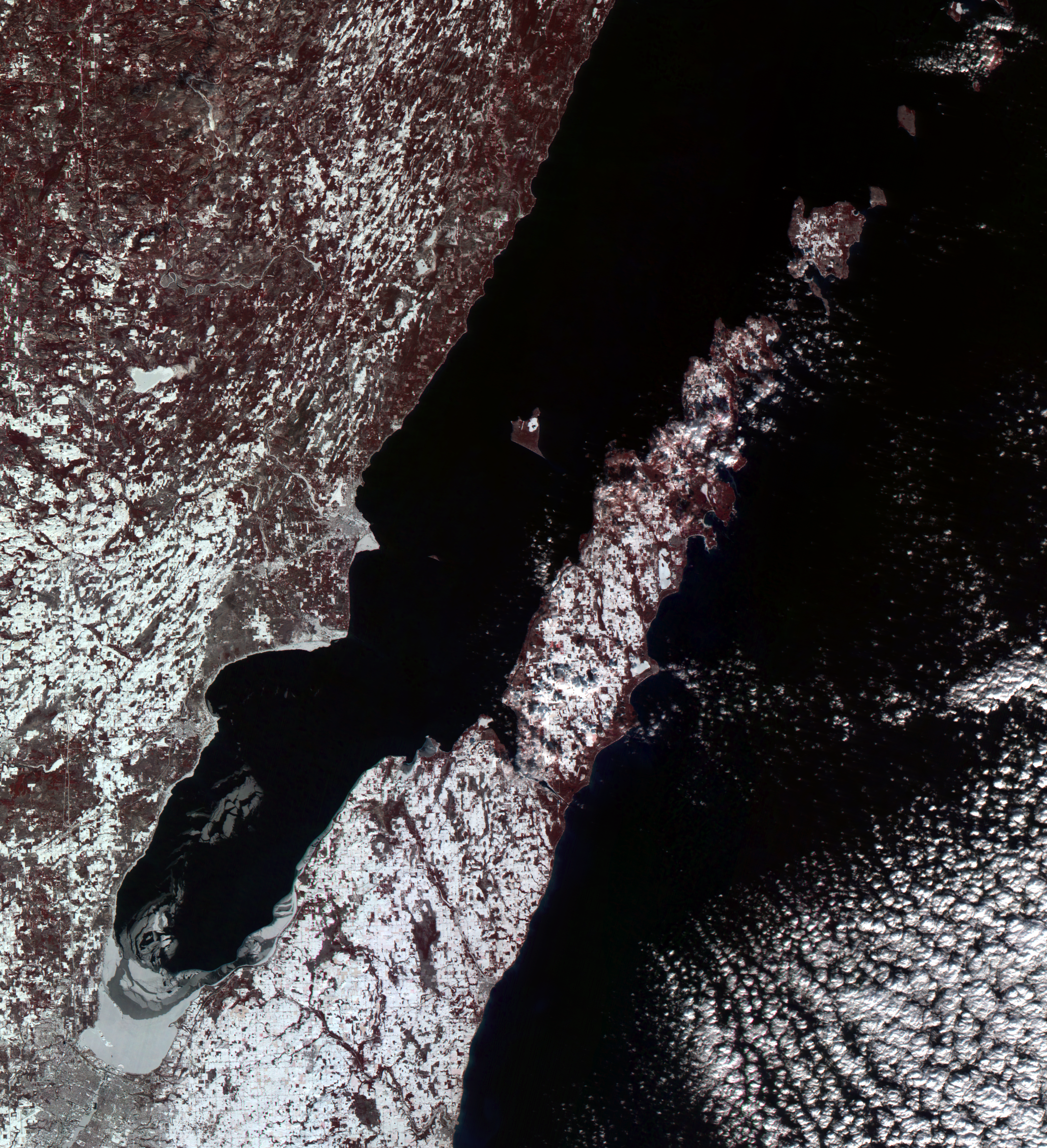
From Resourcesat-2 on December 8, 2021

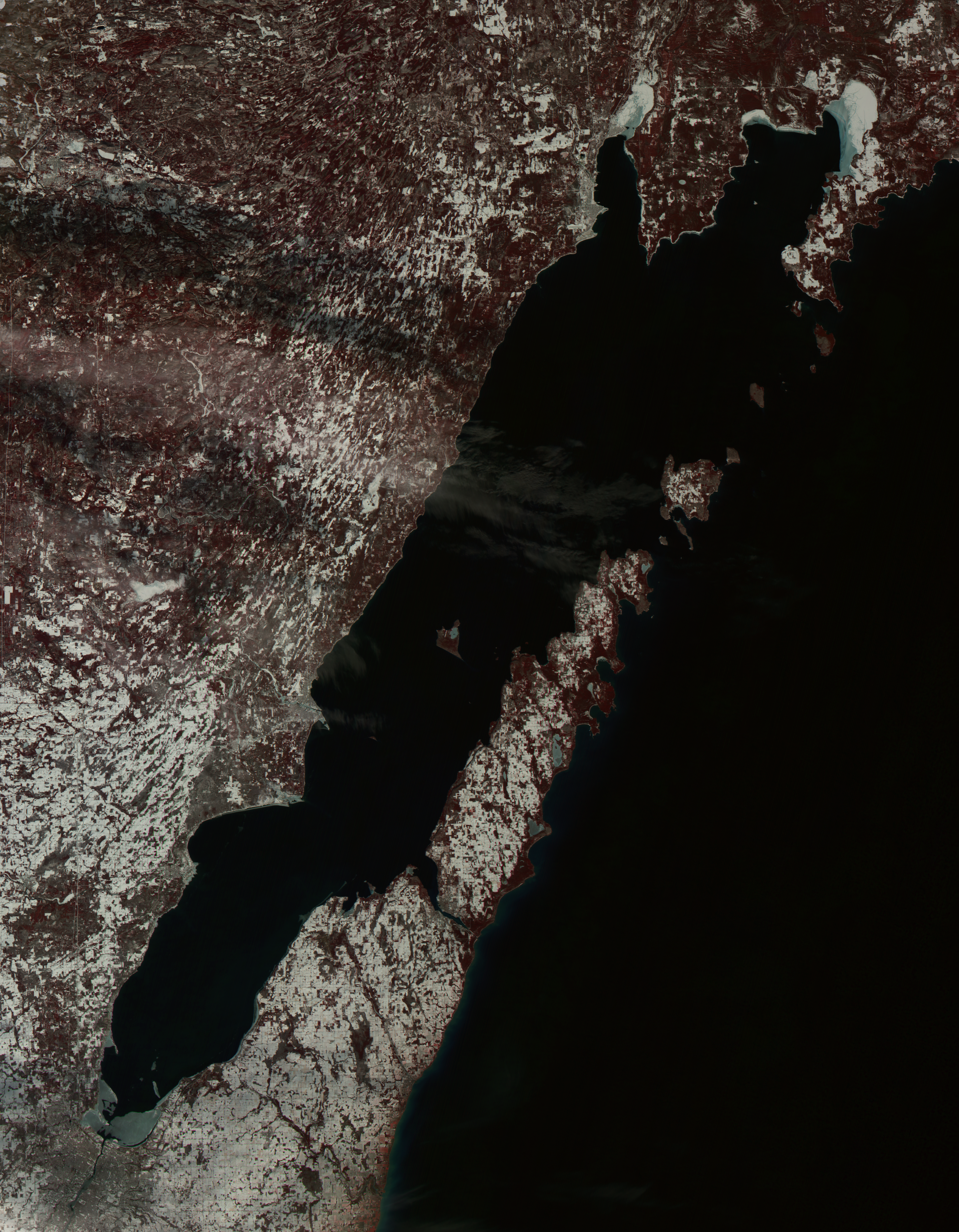
From Resourcesat-2 on December 13, 2021

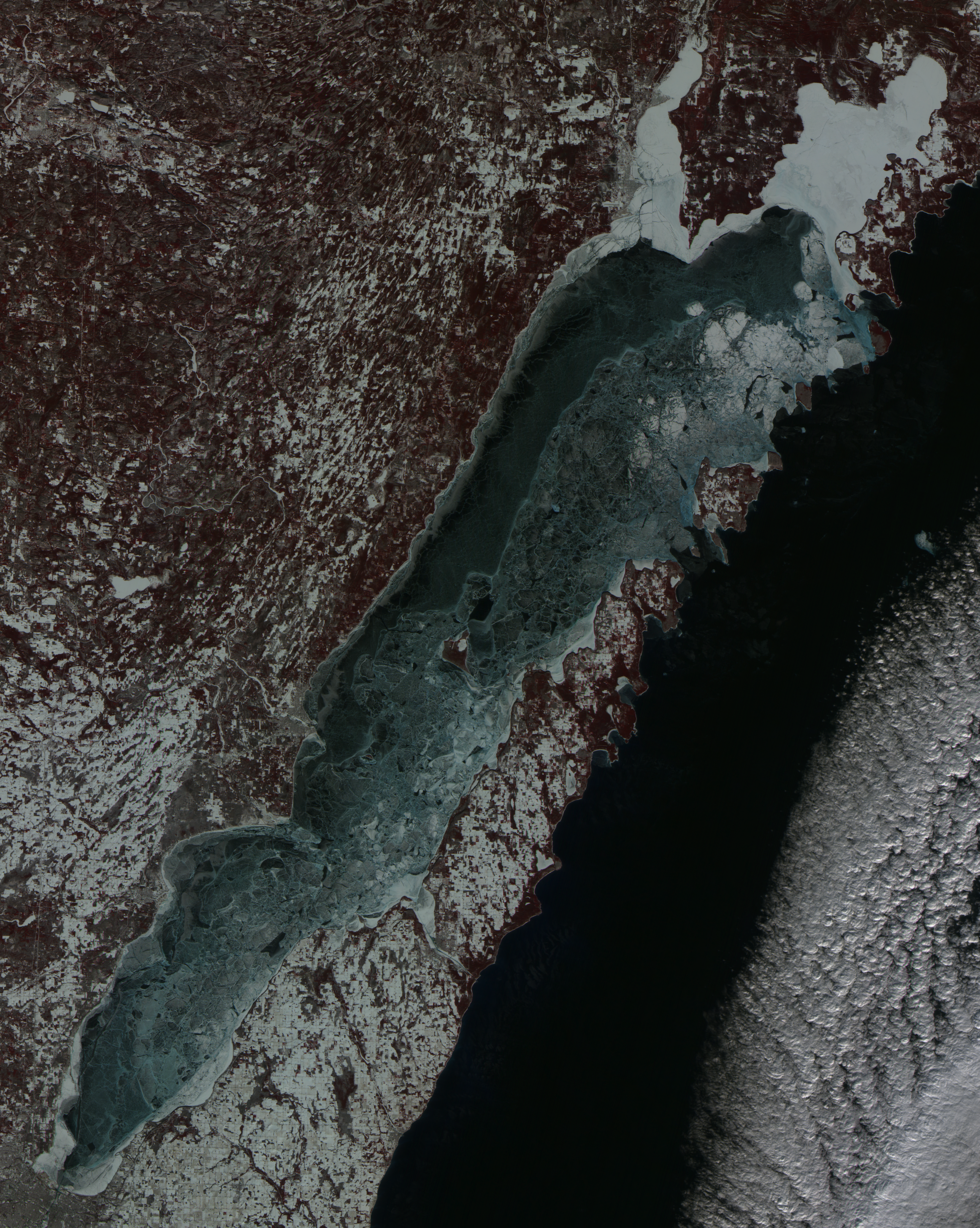
From Resourcesat-2 on January 21, 2022

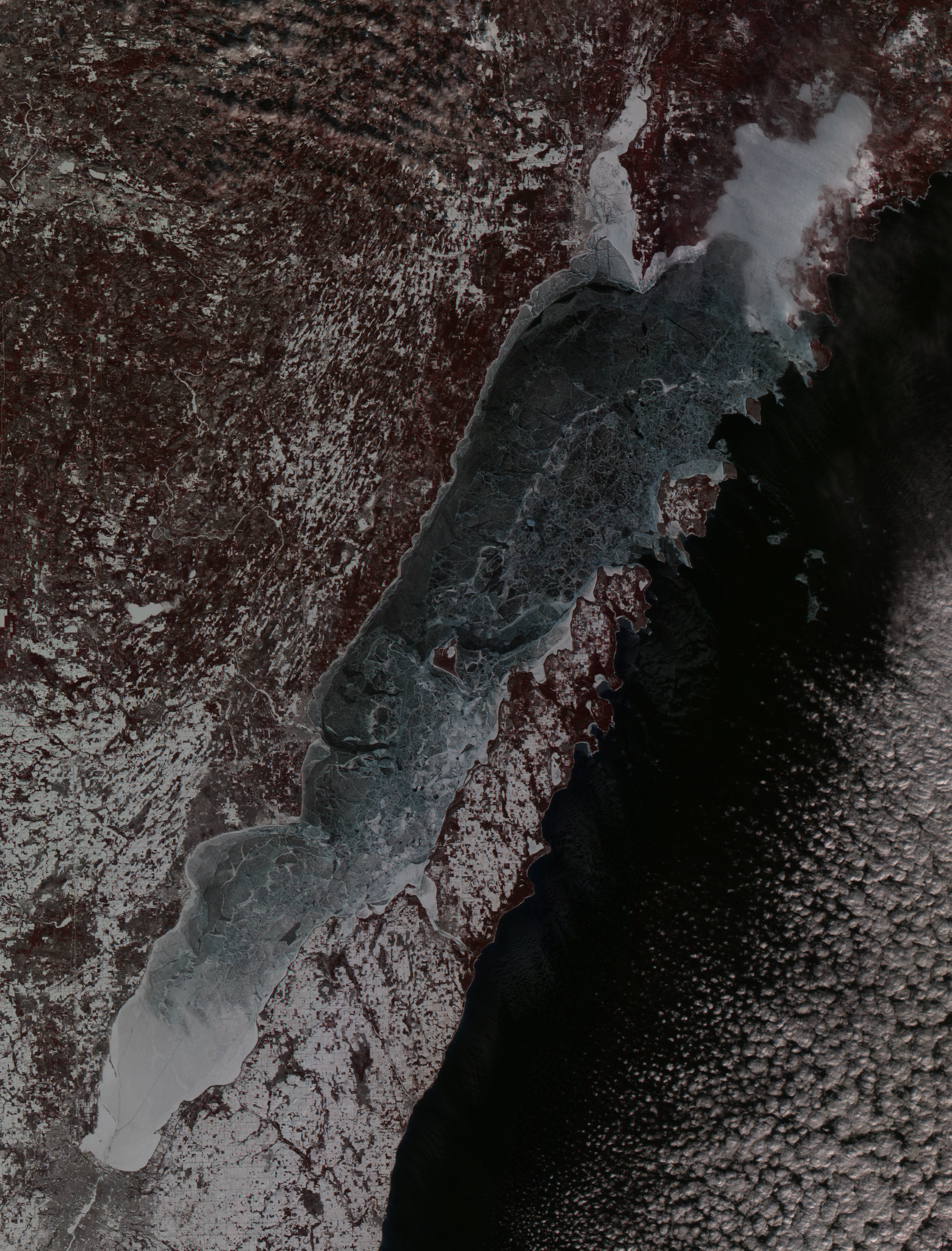
From Resourcesat-2 on January 25, 2022

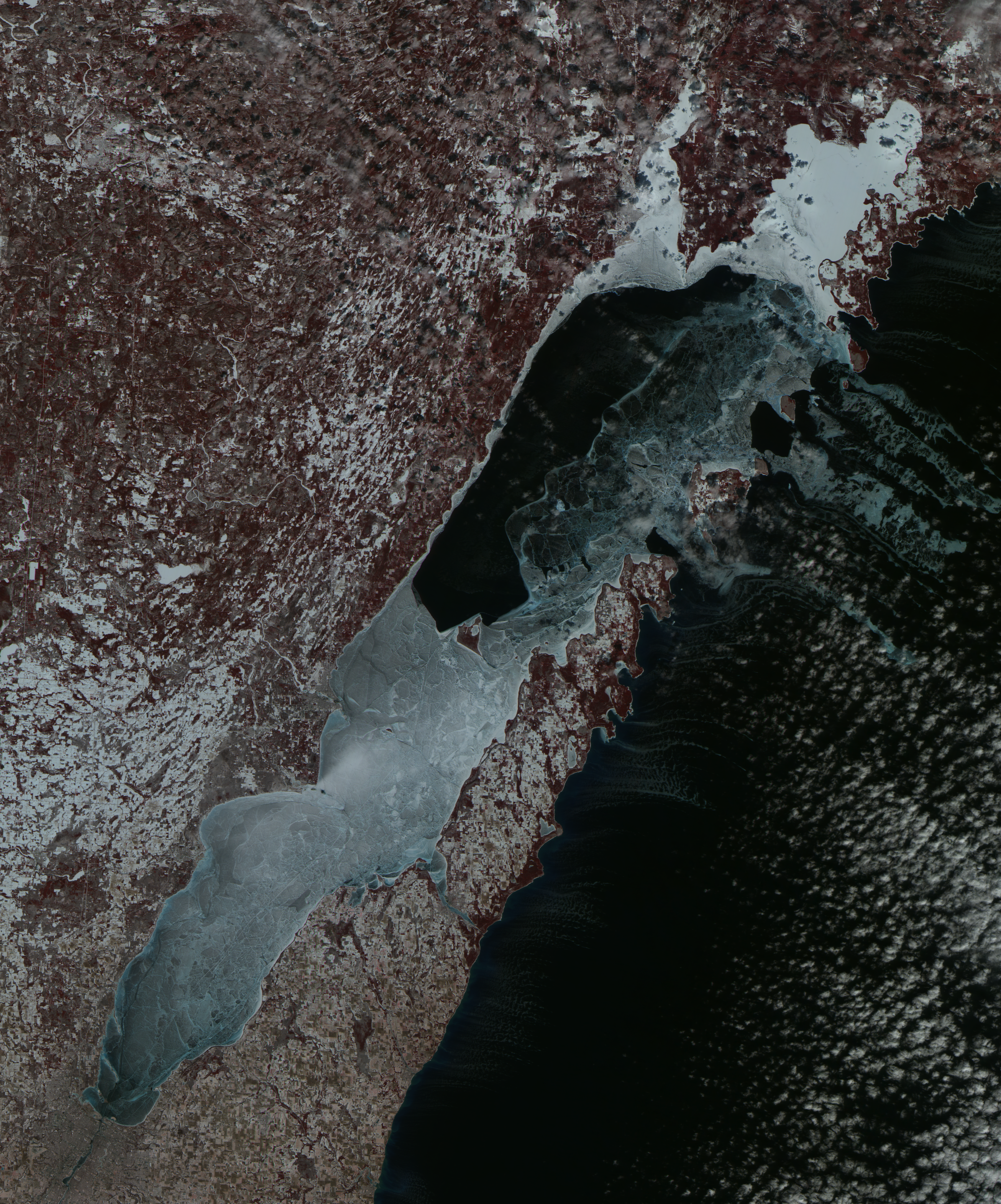
From Resourcesat-2 on February 19, 2022

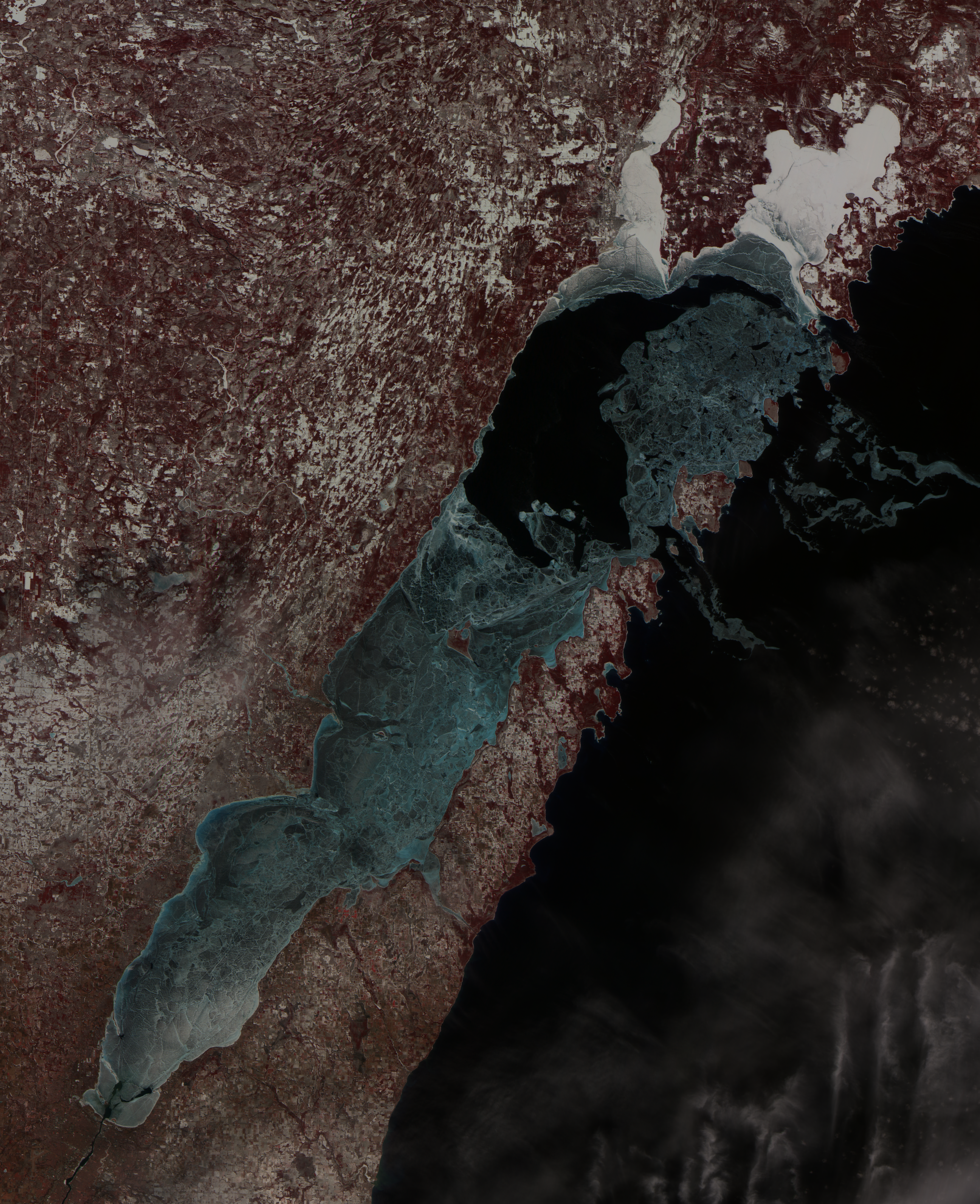
From Resourcesat-2 on March 10, 2022

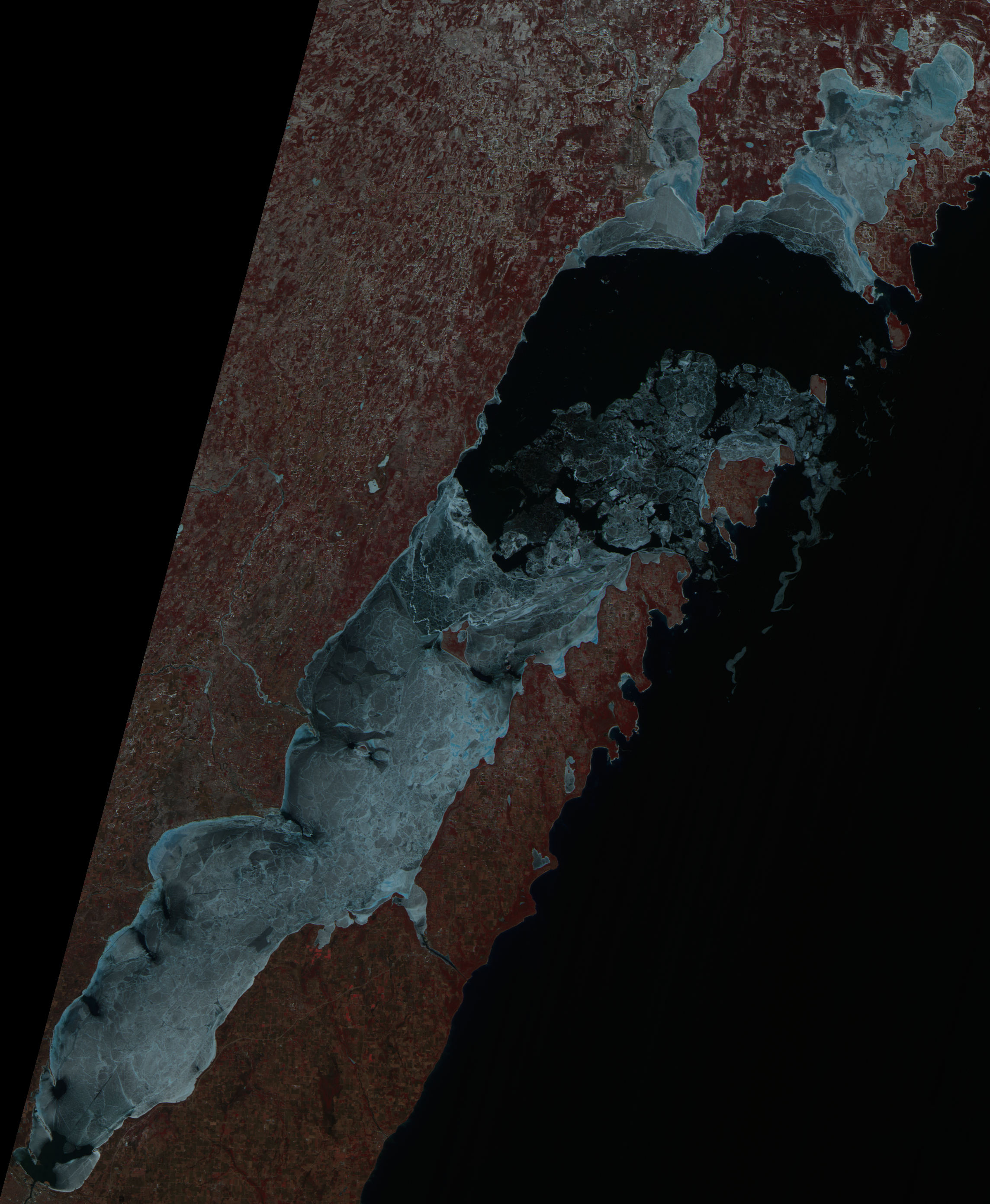
From Resourcesat-2 on March 20, 2022

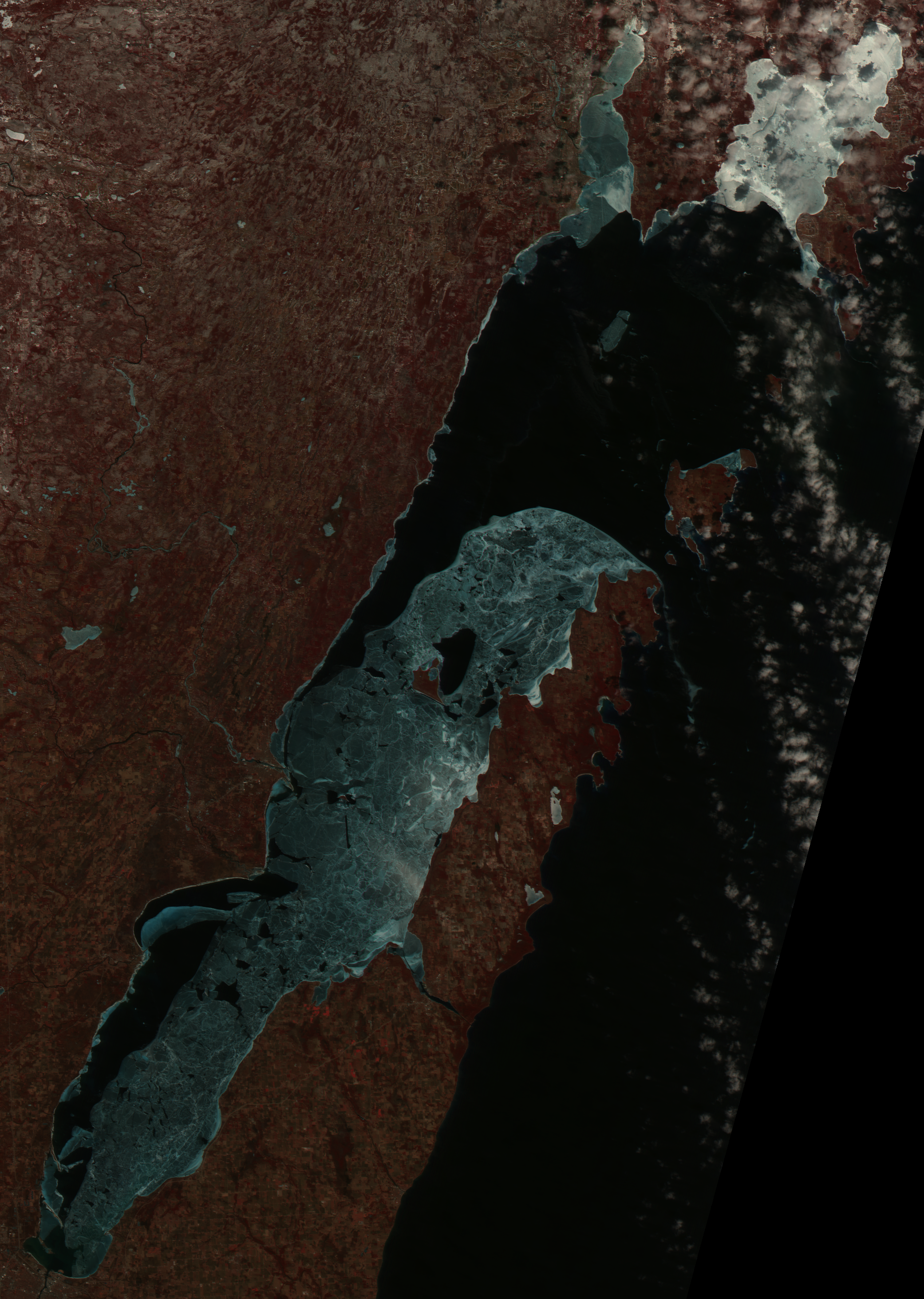
From Resourcesat-2 on March 28, 2022

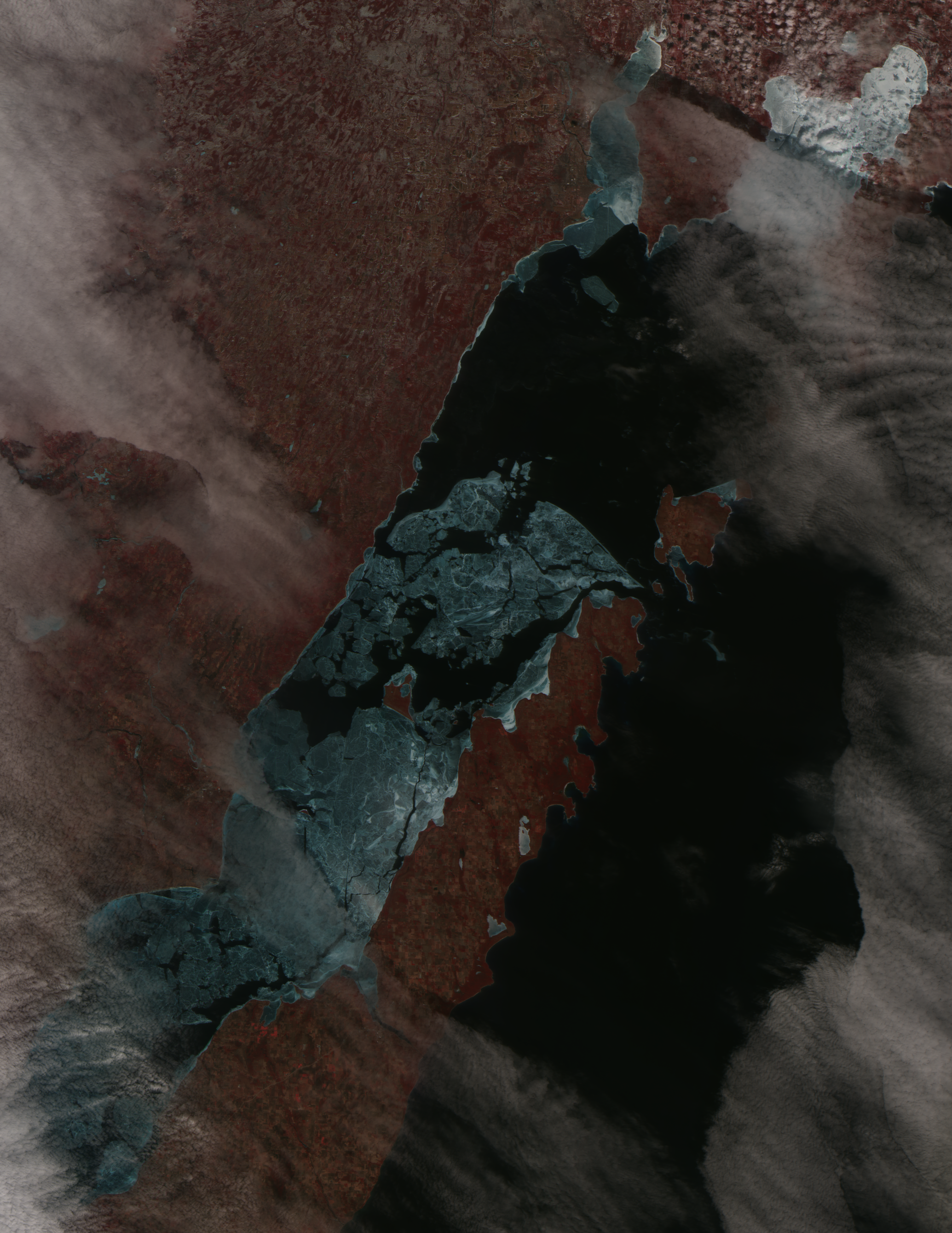
Taken with Resourcesat-2 on March 29, 2022

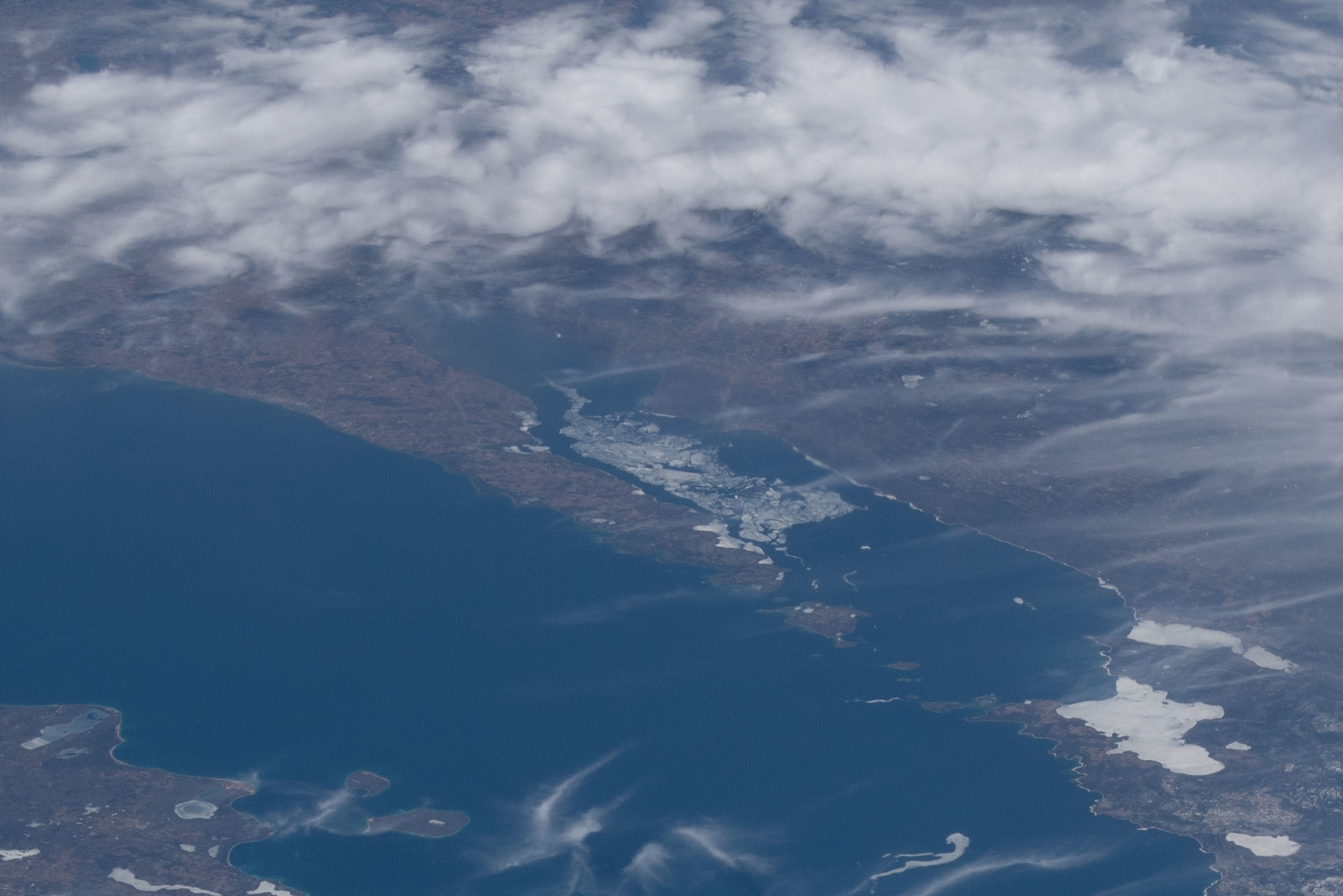
Taken on April 10, 2022 during Expedition 67 of the International Space Station, north is oriented to the right

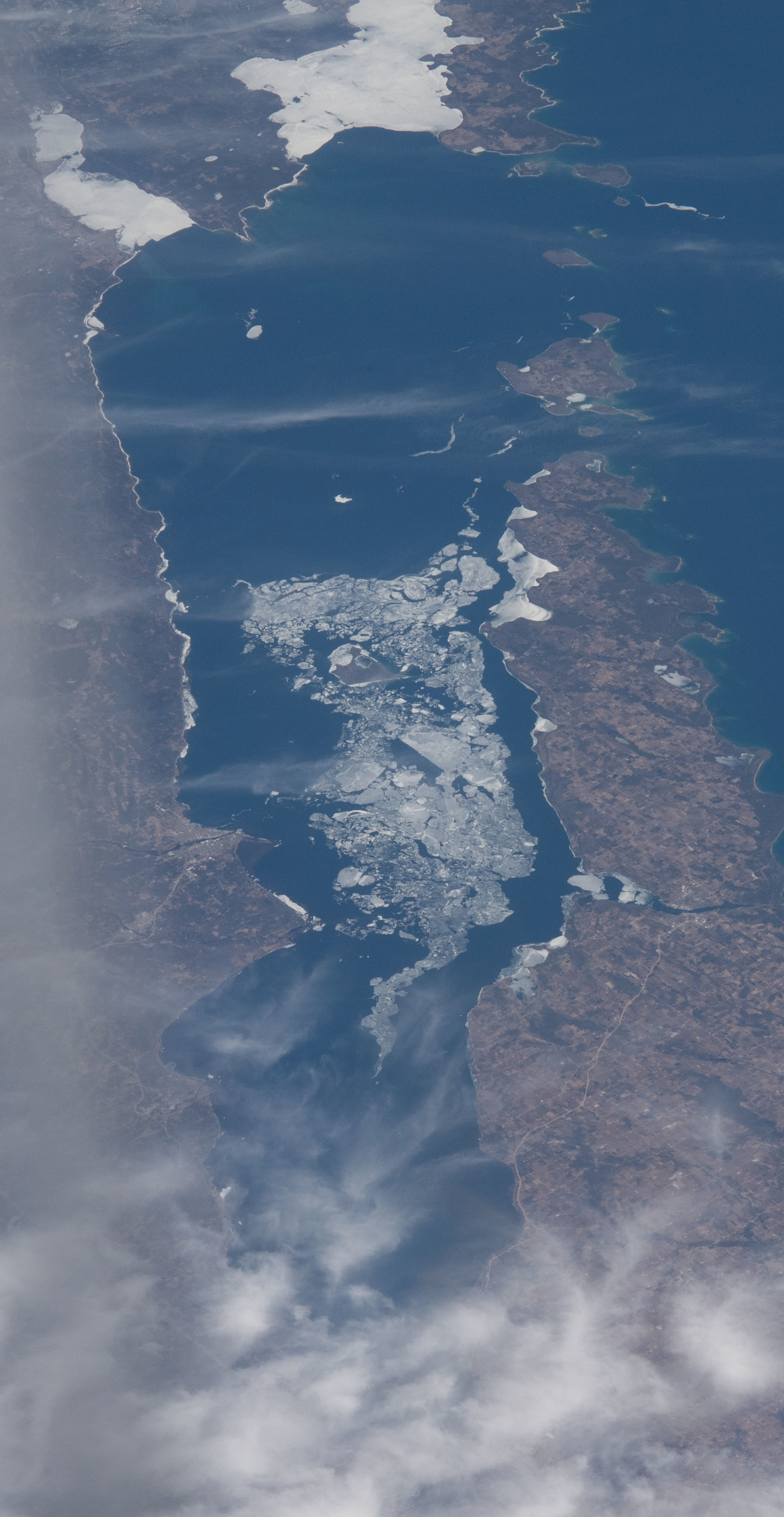
Taken on April 10, 2022 during Expedition 67 of the ISS

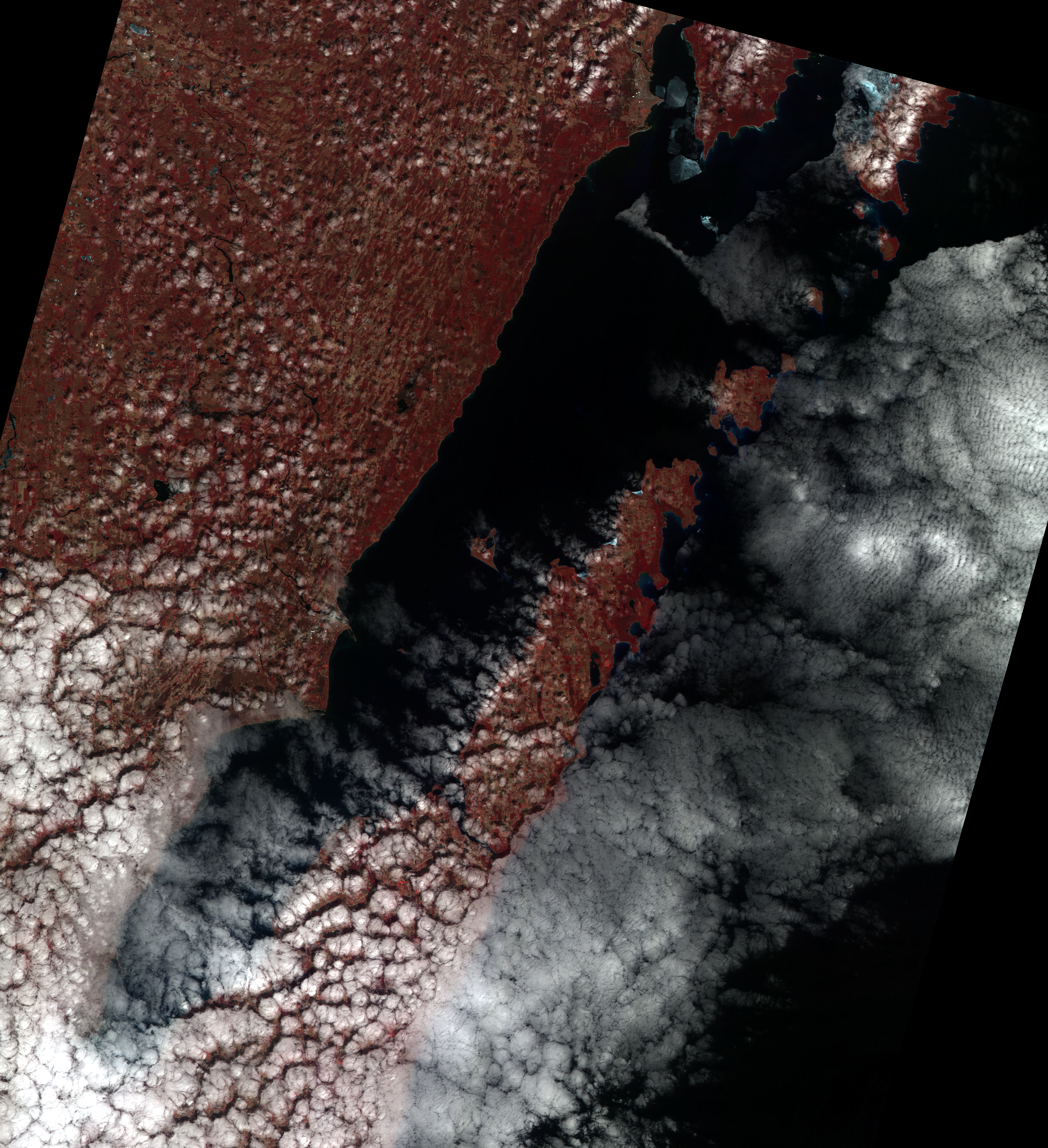
From Resourcesat-2 on April 17, 2022

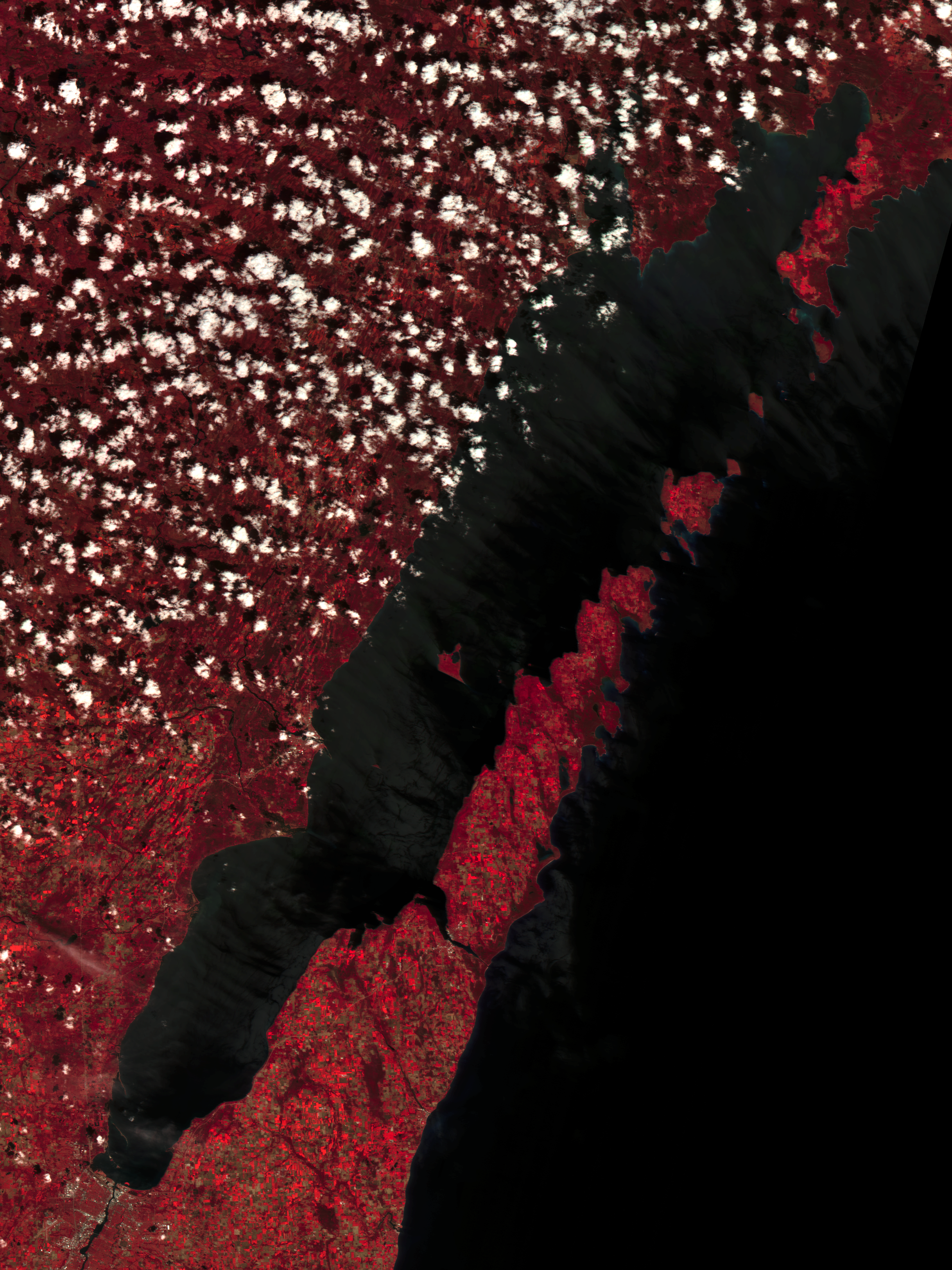
From Resourcesat-2 on May 15, 2022

== See also ==
- Peshtigo Fire, a firestorm that affected land on both sides of Green Bay, and the deadliest fire in the history of the United States
- Grand Traverse Bay, another large arm of Lake Michigan, located in the Lower Peninsula of Michigan
