= List of islands of Wisconsin =

Islands of the state of Wisconsin
- Location of Wisconsin within the United States

Geography
- Location: Wisconsin
- Major islands: Washington Island, Doty Island, Madeline Island, French Island

Administration
- United States
- State: Wisconsin

The following is a list of named islands of the state of Wisconsin. According to the USGS, there are 431 named islands, and many more unnamed ones among Wisconsin's 15,074 lakes. Wisconsin borders both Lake Michigan and Lake Superior producing many of the state's islands. The Mississippi River also has many islands on the state's western boundary. Wisconsin has many rivers including the Wisconsin River and Fox River.

== Great Lakes ==
=== Lake Michigan ===
Many of the Wisconsin's islands in Lake Michigan are around the Door Peninsula. Islands in Green Bay include those in and around the Green Bay Breakwater. Washington Island is Wisconsin's largest in Lake Michigan and also has a year-round population of 708 as of the 2010 census. The island has a ferry service and operates Washington Island Airport for air travel. Rock Island is a state park that can only be accessed by ferry from Washington Island. Plum Island is home to a former Coast Guard Life-Saving Station and historic range lights. The islands surrounding the northern part of the peninsula are outcroppings of the Niagara Escarpment.

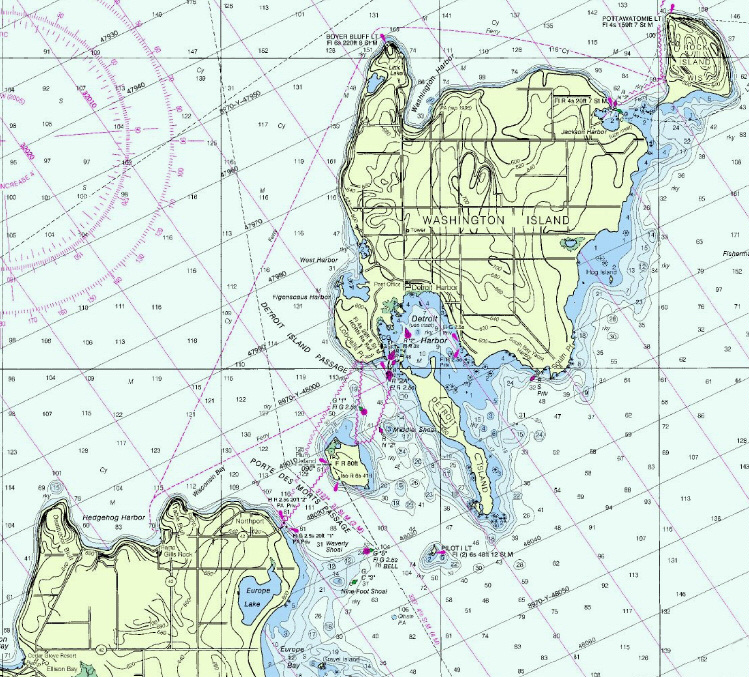
Washington and surrounding islands

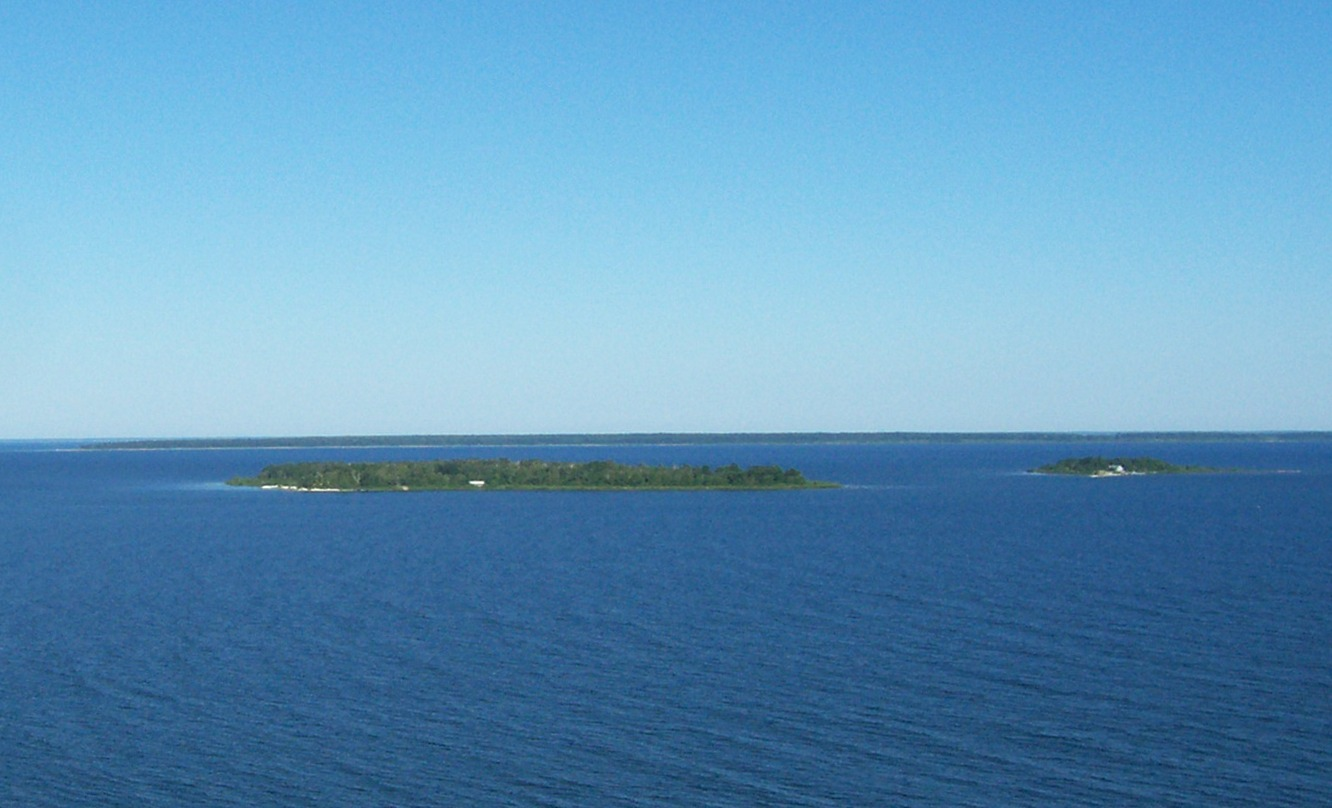
Strawberry Islands

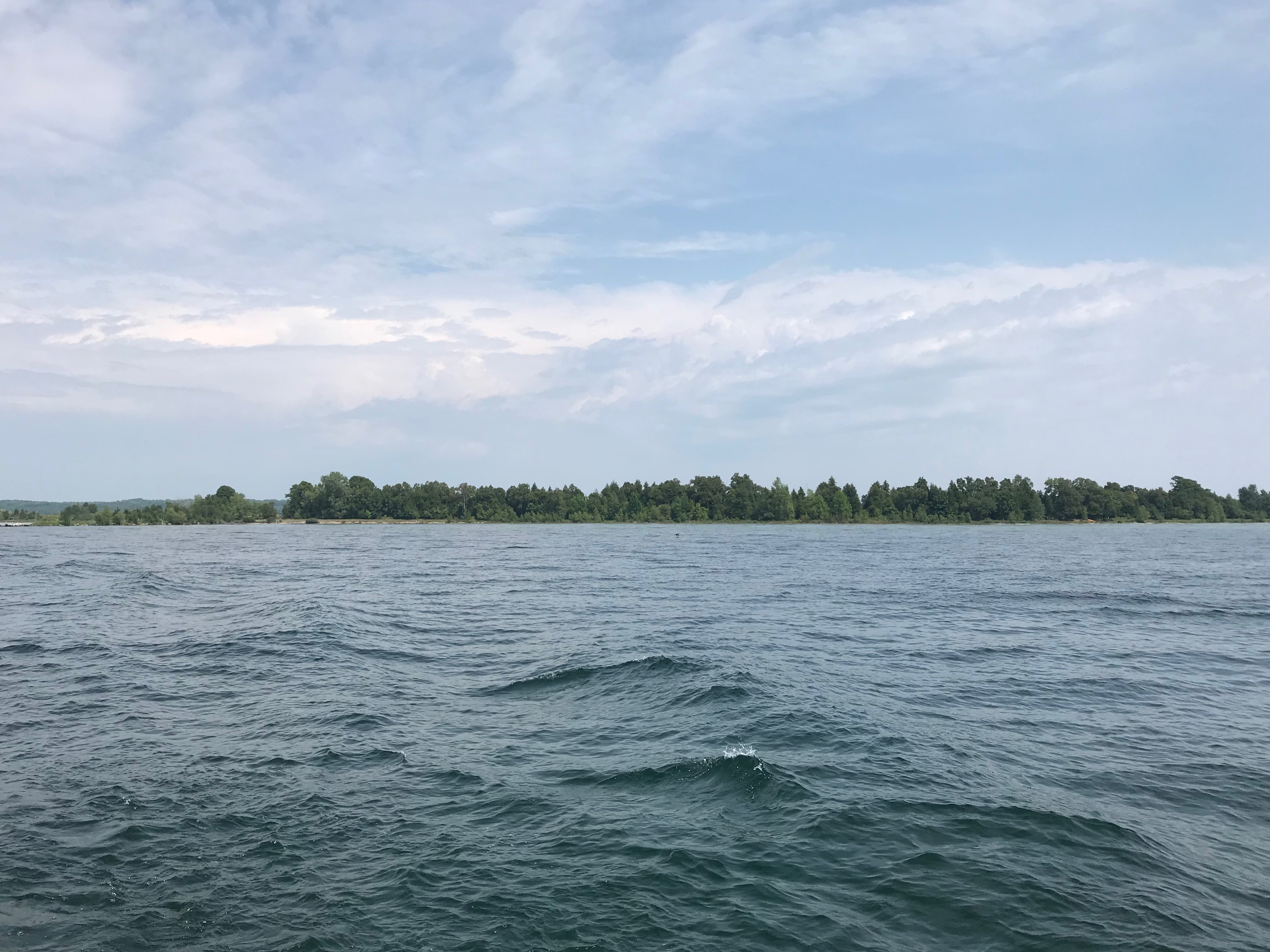
Detroit Island and Detroit Harbor

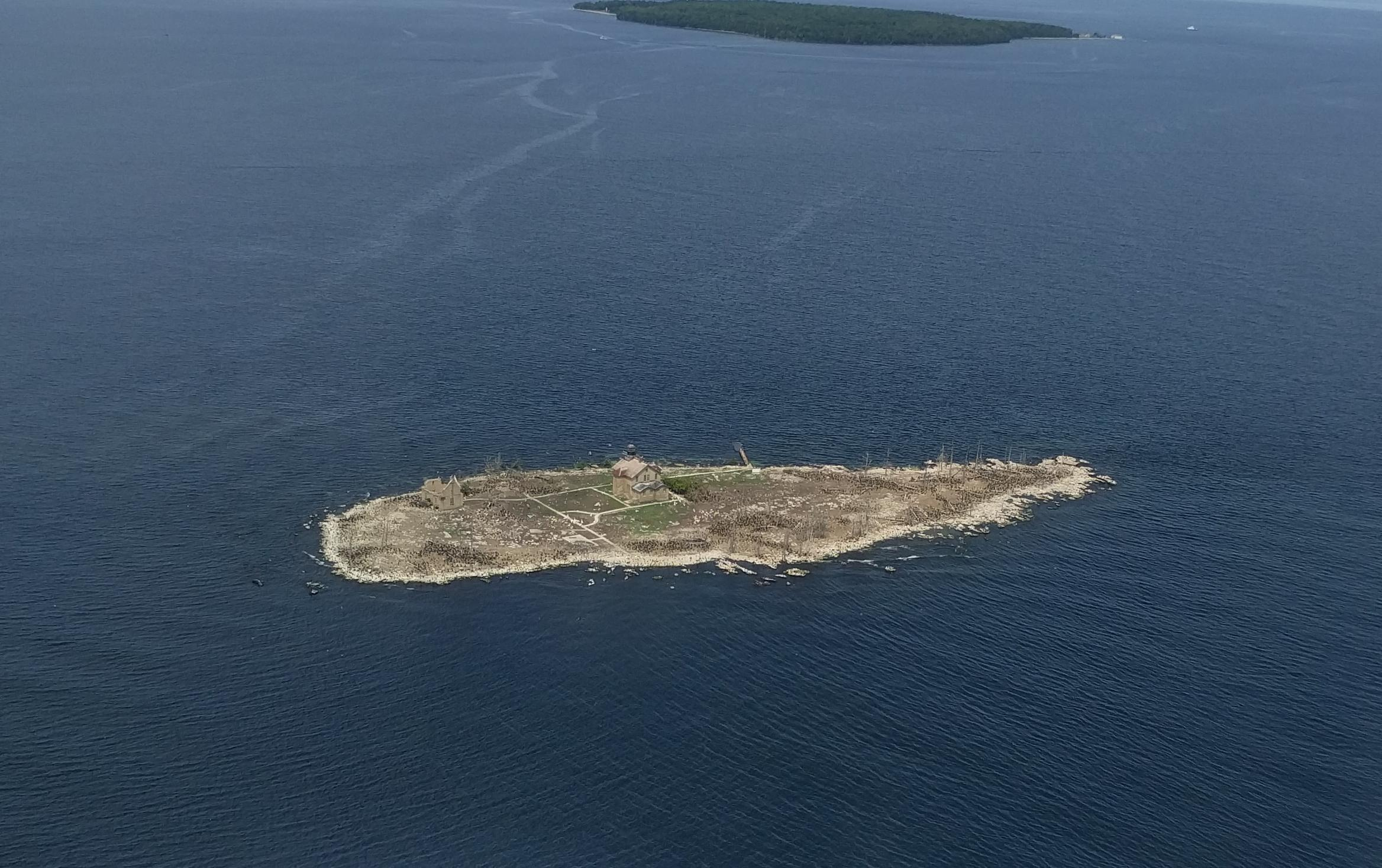
Pilot Island

Island Name	County	Area (acres)	Area (hectares)	Area (sq mi)	Coordinates
Adventure Island	Door	40	16	0.06	45°09′32″N 87°15′55″W
Big Sister Island	Door	5.4	2.2	0.01	45°13′30″N 87°08′53″W
Big Susie Island	Door	11.5	4.7	0.02	45°20′57″N 86°55′56″W
Birds Tree Island	Brown	0.6	0.24	<0.01	44°33′32″N 87°59′37″W
Cana Island	Door	8.7	3.5	0.01	45°05′17″N 87°02′58″W
Cat Island	Brown	1.6	0.65	<0.01	44°33′36″N 88°00′06″W
Chambers Island	Door	2,483	1,005	3.88	45°10′56″N 87°21′19″W
Detroit Island	Door	637	258	1.00	45°19′17″N 86°54′58″W
Fish Island	Door	1.5	0.61	<0.01	45°23′40″N 86°45′52″W
Grassy Island	Brown	2.6	1.1	<0.01	44°33′23″N 87°59′29″W
Gravel Island	Door	4.0	1.6	0.01	45°15′13″N 86°57′46″W
Green Island	Marinette	19	7.7	0.03	45°03′31″N 87°29′46″W
Hat Island	Door	8.0	3.2	0.01	45°06′08″N 87°19′04″W
Hog Island	Door	2.1	0.85	<0.01	45°21′26″N 86°51′05″W
Horseshoe Island	Door	32	13	0.05	45°10′44″N 87°12′33″W
Jack Island	Door	2.5	1.0	<0.01	45°10′24″N 87°15′58″W
Little Sister Island	Door	3.1	1.3	<0.01	45°13′22″N 87°08′33″W
Little Strawberry Island	Door	3.0	1.2	<0.01	45°09′59″N 87°16′10″W
Little Susie Island	Door	2.2	0.89	<0.01	45°20′52″N 86°55′57″W
Pilot Island	Door	6.2	2.5	0.01	45°17′06″N 86°55′11″W
Pirate Island	Door	2.9	1.2	<0.01	45°10′38″N 87°15′29″W
Plum Island	Door	291	118	0.46	45°18′29″N 86°57′11″W
Rock Island	Door	975	395	1.52	45°24′55″N 86°49′15″W
Snake Island (Town of Nasewaupee)	Door	26	11	0.04	44°52′17″N 87°31′04″W
Snake Island (Town of Washington)	Door	1.4	0.57	<0.01	45°21′03″N 86°55′27″W
Spider Island	Door	23	9.3	0.04	45°12′34″N 86°58′33″W
Squaw Island	Door	6.2	2.5	0.01	44°50′06″N 87°33′22″W
Texas Rock	Milwaukee	See below note*			42°59′27″N 87°52′28″W
Washington Island	Door	15,046	6,089	23.51	45°22′37″N 86°53′47″W
Willow Island	Brown	1.1	0.45	<0.01	44°33′49″N 87°59′56″W

- Texas Rock is officially classified as an island, but is only above the surface of the water with very low water levels.

=== Lake Superior ===
Wisconsin's northernmost point is on Devils Island, part of the Apostle Islands in Lake Superior. It has a population of 302 as of the 2010 census. It can be reached by ferry and airplanes at Major Gilbert Field Airport. The Islands are part of the Apostle Islands National Lakeshore and are featured in Wisconsin's America the Beautiful quarter.

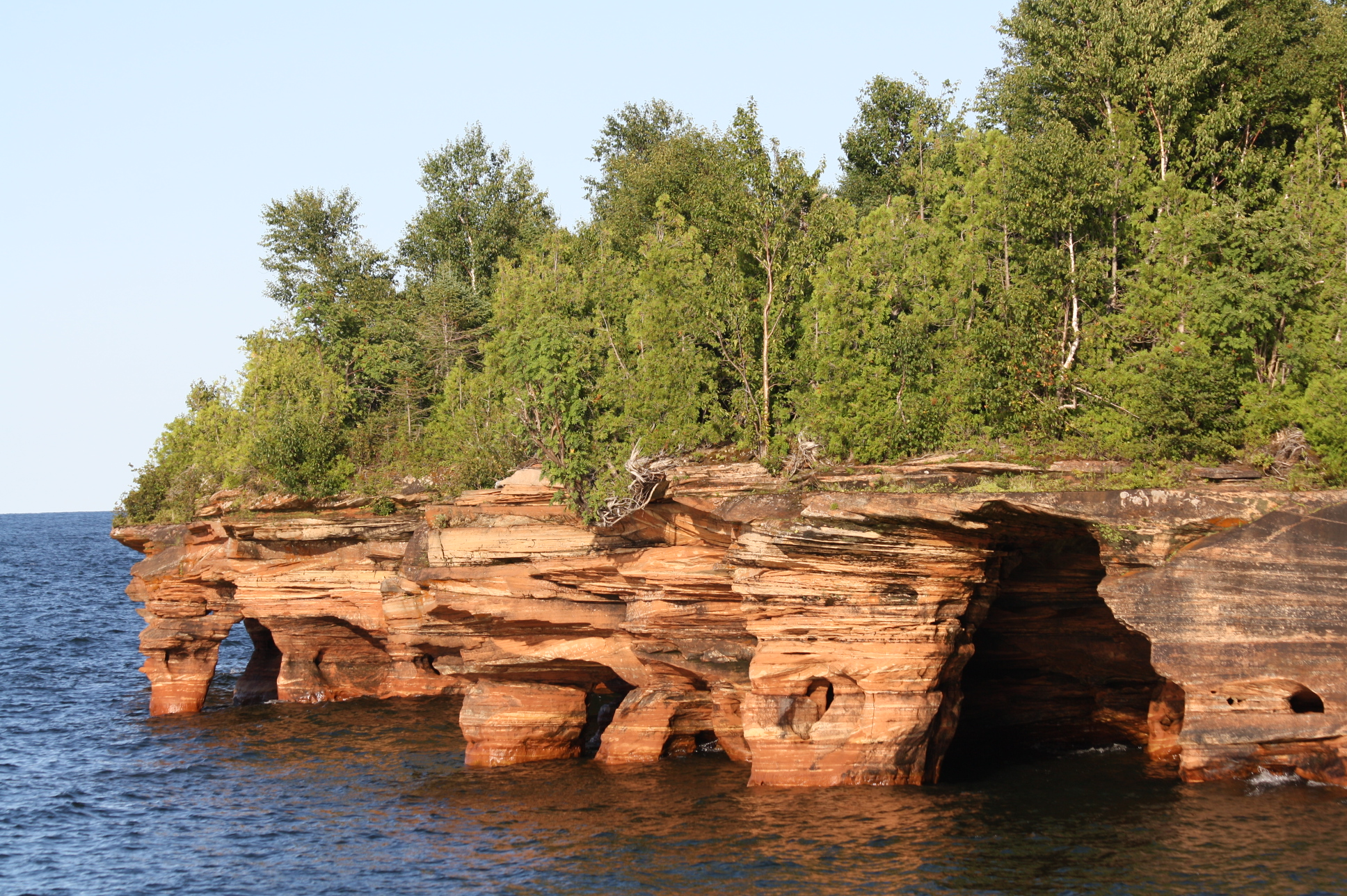
Devils Island Seacaves

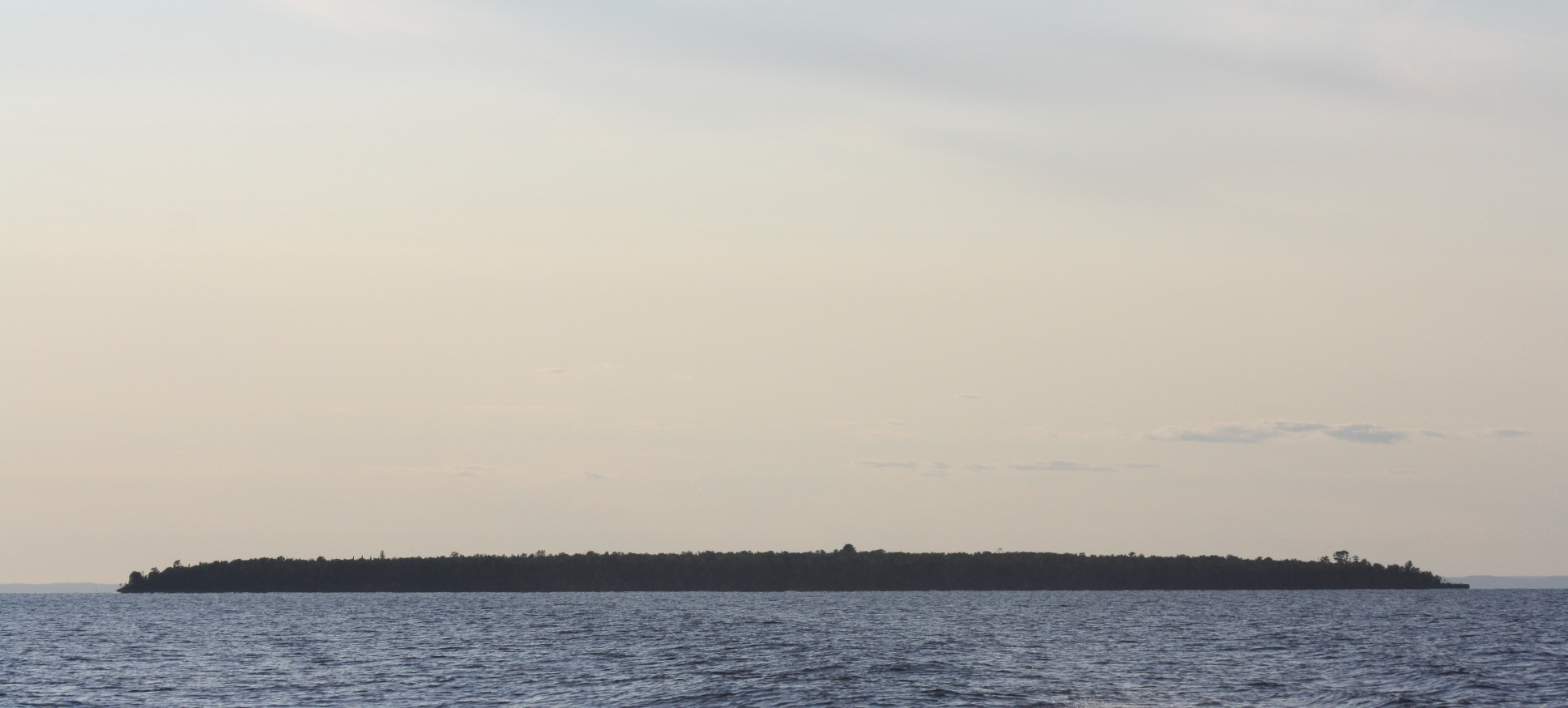
York Island

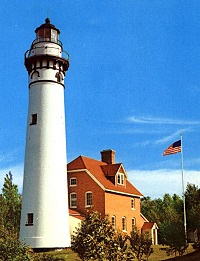
Outer Island Light on Outer Island

Island Name	County	Area (acres)	Area (hectares)	Area (sq mi)	Coordinates
Barker's Island	Douglas	55	22	0.09	46°43′09″N 92°03′26″W
Basswood Island	Ashland	1,914	775	2.99	46°51′01″N 90°44′47″W
Bear Island	Ashland	1,814	734	2.83	47°00′58″N 90°45′28″W
Cat Island	Ashland	1,339	542	2.09	47°00′48″N 90°33′33″W
Devils Island	Ashland	310	130	0.48	47°04′17″N 90°43′36″W
Eagle Island	Bayfield	28	11	0.04	46°56′38″N 91°02′11″W
Gull Island	Ashland	3.5	1.4	0.01	46°54′25″N 90°26′33″W
Hermit Island	Ashland	788	319	1.23	46°53′12″N 90°41′07″W
Hog Island	Douglas	55	22	0.09	46°42′16″N 92°02′10″W
Ironwood Island	Ashland	666	270	1.04	47°00′01″N 90°36′56″W
Long Island	Ashland	309	125	0.48	46°43′37″N 90°47′06″W
Madeline Island	Ashland	15,359	6,216	24.00	46°48′59″N 90°41′21″W
Manitou Island	Ashland	1,325	536	2.07	46°57′56″N 90°39′26″W
Michigan Island	Ashland	1,539	623	2.40	46°52′55″N 90°29′16″W
North Twin Island	Ashland	166	67	0.26	47°04′04″N 90°35′14″W
Oak Island	Ashland	5,024	2,033	7.85	46°56′14″N 90°43′42″W
Otter Island	Ashland	1,323	535	2.07	46°59′46″N 90°41′28″W
Outer Island	Ashland	7,861	3,181	12.28	47°02′07″N 90°25′52″W
Raspberry Island	Bayfield	288	117	0.45	46°58′31″N 90°47′40″W
Rocky Island	Ashland	1,049	425	1.64	47°02′21″N 90°40′44″W
Sand Island	Bayfield	2,859	1,157	4.47	46°58′45″N 90°56′55″W
South Twin Island	Ashland	336	136	0.53	47°02′00″N 90°38′41″W
Stockton Island	Ashland	9,892	4,003	15.46	46°56′17″N 90°34′43″W
York Island	Bayfield	274	111	0.43	46°58′59″N 90°51′49″W

== Inland Lake and River Islands ==
There are 377 named islands in inland lakes, rivers and marshes, and many more unnamed islands. Over half of the named islands are in the Mississippi River, Wisconsin River, Beaver Dam Lake or Horicon Marsh.

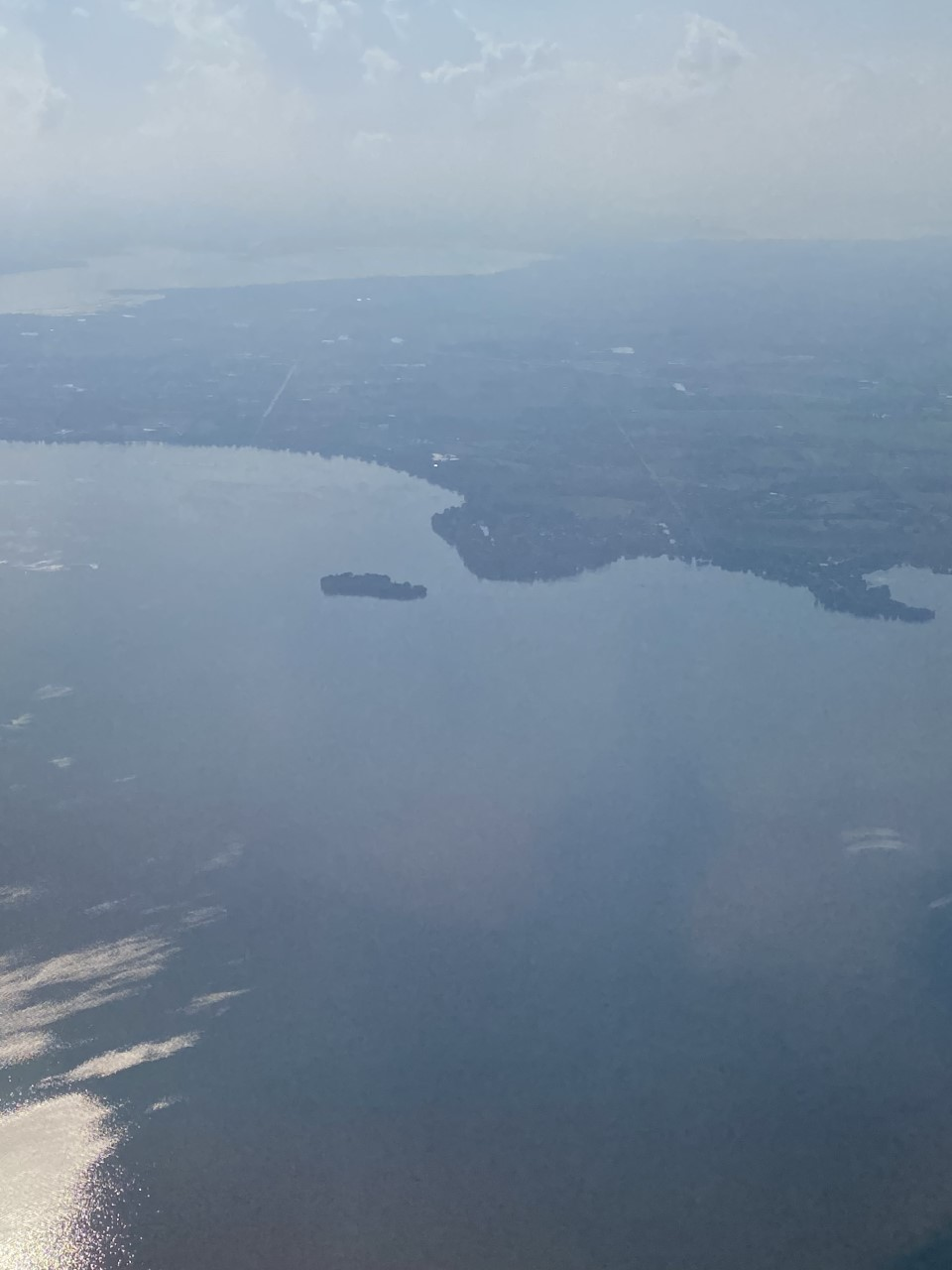
Aerial shot of Garlic Island in Lake Winnebago

Island Name	County	Body of Water	Area (sq mi)	Area (km^{2})	Coordinates
Ajax Island	Oconto	Oconto River	0.03	0.078	44°53′03″N 87°51′23″W
Allen Island	Crawford	Wisconsin River	0.34	0.88	43°07′50″N 90°44′33″W
Ames Island	Dodge	Horicon Marsh	<0.01	<0.026	43°30′05″N 88°40′57″W
Amik Island	Douglas	Saint Louis River	0.01	0.026	46°39′22″N 92°16′44″W
Anchor Island	Iron	Pine Lake	<0.01	<0.026	46°15′56″N 90°08′28″W
Anderson Island	Bayfield	Namekagon Lake	0.13	0.34	46°13′44″N 91°05′31″W
Ansul Islands	Marinette	Menominee River	0.12	0.31	45°07′07″N 87°40′22″W
Anthony Island	Dodge	Sinnissippi Lake	0.05	0.13	43°21′24″N 88°36′01″W
Antigo Island	Oneida	Pelican Lake	0.04	0.10	45°29′35″N 89°11′39″W
Apple Island	Dodge	Horicon Marsh	<0.01	<0.026	43°30′53″N 88°39′33″W
Arrowhead Island	La Crosse	Mississippi River	0.01	0.026	43°53′58″N 91°17′11″W
Babbs Island	Sawyer	Flambeau River	0.01	0.026	45°46′09″N 90°45′17″W
Babe Island	Dodge	Beaver Dam Lake	<0.01	<0.026	43°27′43″N 88°52′12″W
Baby Fourmile Island	Dodge	Horicon Marsh	<0.01	<0.026	43°29′19″N 88°37′42″W
Baker Island	Marinette	Menominee River	0.01	0.026	45°20′54″N 87°45′24″W
Bald Eagle Island	Polk	Bone Lake	0.02	0.052	45°31′43″N 92°23′17″W
Balls Island	Grant	Mississippi River	0.10	0.26	42°40′11″N 90°51′39″W
Barkers Island	Marathon	Wisconsin River	0.02	0.052	44°57′48″N 89°37′59″W
Barron Island	La Crosse	Mississippi River	0.44	1.1	43°48′55″N 91°15′50″W
Bass Island	Florence	Bass Lake	<0.01	<0.026	45°53′22″N 88°08′15″W
Battle Island	Buffalo	Chippewa River	0.07	0.18	44°28′40″N 92°03′25″W
Battle Island	Vernon	Mississippi River	0.05	0.13	43°27′29″N 91°13′49″W
Bear Island	Polk	Balsam Lake	<0.01	<0.026	45°27′46″N 92°26′24″W
Bedker Island	Dodge	Beaver Dam Lake	<0.01	<0.026	43°31′08″N 88°57′17″W
Beggs Island	Waukesha	Lac La Belle	0.01	0.026	43°07′30″N 88°30′32″W
Bell Island	La Crosse	Mississippi River	?	?	43°53′38″N 91°15′22″W
Bell Island	Columbia	Lake Wisconsin	<0.01	<0.026	43°21'20.5"N 89°38'04.0"W
Belle Island	Vilas	Mamie Lake	0.01	0.026	46°11′38″N 89°23′54″W
Belle Island	Wood	Wisconsin River	0.01	0.026	44°23′13″N 89°49′55″W
Bergman Island	Crawford	Mississippi River	0.02	0.052	43°01′08″N 91°09′37″W
Bertom Island	Grant	McCartney Lake	0.04	0.10	42°40′57″N 90°52′00″W
Beulah Island	Walworth	Lake Beulah	0.05	0.13	42°49′59″N 88°22′52″W
Big Banana Island	Sawyer	Chippewa Flowage	0.13	0.34	45°55′53″N 91°13′57″W
Big Island	Burnett	Saint Croix River	0.69	1.8	46°04′50″N 92°13′28″W
Big Island	Iron	Turtle-Flambeau Flowage	3.53	9.1	46°05′45″N 90°13′08″W
Big Island	Marathon	Wisconsin River	0.64	1.7	44°44′25″N 89°43′50″W
Big Island	Oneida	Squash Lake	<0.01	<0.026	45°36′08″N 89°33′03″W
Big Island	Polk	Balsam Lake	0.06	0.16	45°27′48″N 92°26′00″W
Big Island	Richland	Wisconsin River	0.12	0.31	43°11′00″N 90°37′56″W
Big Island	Sawyer	Nelson Lake	0.92	2.4	46°05′20″N 91°27′51″W
Big Island	Wood	Wisconsin River	0.46	1.2	44°24′56″N 89°48′27″W
Big Ripley Island	Oneida	Kawaguesaga Lake	0.03	0.078	45°52′20″N 89°44′27″W
Big Skunk Island	Dodge	Beaver Dam Lake	<0.01	<0.026	43°29′18″N 88°51′16″W
Big Timber Island	Sawyer	Chippewa Flowage	0.50	1.3	45°55′40″N 91°07′49″W
Birch Island	Sawyer	Chippewa Flowage	0.01	0.026	45°56′00″N 91°13′11″W
Bird Island	Sawyer	Teal Lake	<0.01	<0.026	46°04′42″N 91°06′25″W
Black Oak Island	Trempealeau	Mississippi River	0.05	0.13	44°02′08″N 91°30′34″W
Blackbird Island	Winnebago	Lake Winnebago	<0.01	<0.026	44°06′45″N 88°27′42″W
Blackhawk Island	Juneau	Wisconsin River	0.28	0.73	43°39′00″N 89°47′35″W
Blueberry Island	Marinette	Menominee River	0.01	0.026	45°06′28″N 87°39′06″W
Bonies Mound	Iron	Turtle-Flambeau Flowage	<0.01	<0.026	46°05′16″N 90°06′35″W
Boom Island	Marinette	Menominee River	0.01	0.026	45°06′18″N 87°37′54″W
Wet Beard Island	Winnebago	Wolf River	0.01	0.026	44°11′54″N 88°49′07″W
Boomerang Island	Vernon	Mississippi River	0.03	0.078	43°39′39″N 91°14′52″W
Bradys Island	Barron	Hemlock Lake	<0.01	<0.026	45°34′09″N 91°34′06″W
Brecker Island	Dodge	Horicon Marsh	0.01	0.026	43°29′10″N 88°39′36″W
Broken Bow Island	Vernon	Mississippi River	0.01	0.026	43°39′28″N 91°16′01″W
Broken Gun Island	La Crosse	Mississippi River	0.01	0.026	43°54′47″N 91°17′22″W
Brunet Island	Chippewa	Cornell Flowage	0.27	0.70	45°10′58″N 91°10′04″W
Brush Island	Dunn	Chippewa River	0.65	1.7	44°45′13″N 91°44′11″W
Brushwood Island	Dodge	Fox Lake	0.02	0.052	43°35′15″N 88°54′43″W
Bubar Island	Douglas	Saint Croix Flowage	0.45	1.2	46°15′07″N 91°53′03″W
Buckeye Island	Dodge	Beaver Dam Lake	<0.01	<0.026	43°27′59″N 88°52′19″W
Bucks Island	Buffalo	Mississippi River	0.01	0.026	44°13′41″N 91°52′02″W
Buffalo Island	Buffalo	Chippewa River	0.28	0.73	44°35′07″N 92°01′26″W
Bullrush Island	Buffalo	Mississippi River	0.02	0.052	44°12′05″N 91°50′38″W
Bunyans Hat Island	Rusk	Dairyland Reservoir	0.03	0.078	45°29′44″N 91°01′24″W
Butternut Island	Dodge	Sinnissippi Lake	0.05	0.13	43°22′46″N 88°37′15″W
Carlson Island	Polk	Balsam Lake	0.02	0.052	45°28′01″N 92°25′49″W
Cedar Island	Iowa	Wisconsin River	0.70	1.8	43°11′04″N 89°54′41″W
Cedar Island	Polk	Balsam Lake	<0.01	<0.026	45°27′44″N 92°26′51″W
Champaign Island	Bayfield	Namekagon Lake	<0.01	<0.026	46°12′35″N 91°06′34″W
Chippewa Island	Dunn	Chippewa River	1.28	3.3	44°45′08″N 91°48′01″W
Clare Island	Sauk	Lake Delton	<0.01	<0.026	43°36′23″N 89°46′49″W
Clark Island	Adams & Juneau	Wisconsin River	0.27	0.70	43°43′32″N 89°50′07″W
Clough Island	Douglas	Saint Louis River	0.56	1.5	46°42′10″N 92°11′21″W
Clubhouse Island	Dodge	Horicon Marsh	0.01	0.026	43°29′34″N 88°39′58″W
Clumbs Island	Oneida	Lake Minocqua	<0.01	<0.026	45°52′42″N 89°41′45″W
Coleman Islands	Dodge	Horicon Marsh	0.01	0.026	43°28′13″N 88°38′59″W
Coles Island	Dodge	Rock River	0.01	0.026	43°19′22″N 88°35′17″W
Colin Island	Vilas	Upper Bucktabon Lake	0.01	0.026	46°00′59″N 89°20′50″W
Cormorant Island	La Crosse	Mississippi River	0.01	0.026	43°54′12″N 91°17′54″W
Cotton Island	Dodge	Horicon Marsh	0.01	0.026	43°29′05″N 88°37′46″W
Coumbe Island	Grant	Wisconsin River	0.54	1.4	43°11′52″N 90°34′51″W
Crane Island	Dodge	Sinnissippi Lake	0.01	0.026	43°22′26″N 88°36′42″W
Crane Island	Vernon	Mississippi River	?	?	43°37′42″N 91°13′31″W
Crats Island	Buffalo	Mississippi River	0.22	0.57	44°22′59″N 92°00′56″W
Crescent Island	Oneida	Pelican Lake	<0.01	<0.026	45°30′45″N 89°12′32″W
Crownhart Island	Douglas	Upper Saint Croix Lake	0.01	0.026	46°20′25″N 91°48′42″W
Cuba Island	Dodge	Beaver Dam Lake	<0.01	<0.026	43°27′18″N 88°51′19″W
Darrow Island	Sawyer	Chippewa Flowage	0.27	0.70	45°58′12″N 91°11′48″W
Dead Island	Dodge	Fox Lake	<0.01	<0.026	43°35′26″N 88°55′20″W
Dead Island	Oneida	Tomahawk Lake	<0.01	<0.026	45°48′52″N 89°38′28″W
Dead Lake Island	Pepin	Chippewa River	0.60	1.6	44°34′55″N 92°02′14″W
Deakin Island	Walworth	Middle Lake	0.01	0.026	42°46′29″N 88°33′52″W
Deep Hole Island	Buffalo	Mississippi River	0.02	0.052	44°12′12″N 91°50′18″W
Deer Island	Jackson	Unnamed marsh	0.27	0.70	44°16′47″N 90°22′21″W
Deer Island	Oconto	Wheeler Lake	<0.01	<0.026	45°19′17″N 88°28′46″W
Deer Island	Pepin	Mississippi River	?	?	44°27′13″N 92°12′07″W
Deer Island	Sauk	Wisconsin River	?	?	43°10′34″N 90°02′09″W
Deer Toe Island	Buffalo	Mississippi River	0.01	0.026	44°12′31″N 91°51′45″W
Denby Island	Oneida	Medicine Lake	0.04	0.10	45°48′37″N 89°07′21″W
Devil Island	Dodge	Fox Lake	<0.01	<0.026	43°35′07″N 88°56′47″W
Dewings Island	Walworth	Mill Lake	0.01	0.026	42°45′35″N 88°33′37″W
Diamond Island	Dodge	Rock River	?	?	43°25′34″N 88°38′06″W
Diamond Island	Pierce	Mississippi River	0.08	0.21	44°36′09″N 92°35′06″W
Dodes Island	Sawyer	Flambeau River	<0.01	<0.026	45°39′10″N 90°47′40″W
Doty Island	Winnebago	Fox River	1.11	2.9	44°11′37″N 88°26′51″W
Drescher Island	Jackson	Unnamed marsh	?	?	44°15′29″N 90°24′37″W
Duck Island	Vilas	Lac Vieux Desert	0.03	0.078	46°08′07″N 89°05′58″W
Dutchman Islands	Juneau	Wisconsin River	0.05	0.13	43°42′29″N 89°49′43″W
Eagle Island	Florence	Middle Lake	<0.01	<0.026	45°53′38″N 88°08′16″W
Eagle Island	Vernon	Mississippi River	0.01	0.026	43°40′32″N 91°13′45″W
Eagles Nest Island	Sawyer	Chippewa Flowage	0.03	0.078	45°57′32″N 91°10′43″W
East Island	Vernon	Mississippi River	<0.01	<0.026	43°39′03″N 91°14′21″W
Edwards Island	Wood	Wisconsin River	0.04	0.10	44°22′19″N 89°50′56″W
Elmwood Island	Dodge	Fox Lake	0.01	0.026	43°35′10″N 88°55′15″W
Everbreeze Island	Oneida	Manson Lake	<0.01	<0.026	45°33′49″N 89°37′59″W
Evergreen Island	Dodge	Beaver Dam Lake	<0.01	<0.026	43°27′30″N 88°51′59″W
Fairy Island	Walworth	Booth Lake	<0.01	<0.026	42°48′06″N 88°25′42″W
Faust Island	Barron	Red Cedar Lake	<0.01	<0.026	45°37′09″N 91°35′19″W
Feather Island	Crawford	Wisconsin River	0.19	0.49	43°09′44″N 90°42′01″W
Fiefield Island	Oneida	Kawaguesaga Lake	0.01	0.026	45°52′05″N 89°43′38″W
Fields Island	Portage	Wisconsin River	0.48	1.2	44°28′08″N 89°33′51″W
First Island	Polk	Balsam Lake	<0.01	<0.026	45°27′28″N 92°27′03″W
Fisher Island	Dodge	Beaver Dam Lake	<0.01	<0.026	43°30′58″N 88°53′09″W
Fishers Island	Oneida	Lake Minocqua	0.01	0.026	45°52′21″N 89°41′16″W
Five Islands	Menominee	Wolf River	0.01	0.026	44°59′43″N 88°36′19″W
Flat Island	Sawyer	Chippewa Flowage	0.37	0.96	45°54′57″N 91°13′27″W
Folson Island	Sawyer	Moose Lake	<0.01	<0.026	46°00′47″N 91°02′14″W
Fourmile Island	Dodge	Horicon Marsh	0.04	0.10	43°29′35″N 88°37′30″W
Fox Island	Vilas	Rest Lake	0.02	0.052	46°08′21″N 89°52′22″W
French Island	Clark	Black River	<0.01	<0.026	44°26′53″N 90°41′35″W
French Island	La Crosse	Mississippi River	0.48	1.2	43°52′13″N 91°15′46″W
Frog Island	Vilas	High Lake	0.02	0.052	46°09′33″N 89°32′28″W
Gangster Island	Vilas	North Twin Lake	0.016	0.041	46°2′27″N 89°9′7″W
Garbutt Island	Sawyer	Lake Chetac	?	?	45°42′37″N 91°30′31″W
Gardner Island	Dodge	Horicon Marsh	<0.01	<0.026	43°31′06″N 88°39′11″W
Garlic Island or Island Park	Winnebago	Lake Winnebago	0.01	0.026	44°05′19″N 88°28′54″W
Garrison Island	Wood	Wisconsin River	0.01	0.026	44°22′31″N 89°50′42″W
Goose Island	Dodge	Beaver Dam Lake	<0.01	<0.026	43°30′37″N 88°52′50″W
Goose Island	Dodge	Horicon Marsh	0.02	0.052	43°32′30″N 88°39′45″W
Goose Island	La Crosse & Vernon	Mississippi River	0.96	2.5	43°43′46″N 91°13′31″W
Government Island	Waupaca	Chain O' Lakes	0.02	0.052	44°20′30″N 89°08′44″W
Governors Island	Dane	Lake Mendota	0.03	0.078	43°07′27″N 89°24′08″W
Grape Island	Dane & Iowa	Wisconsin River	0.09	0.23	43°12′05″N 89°50′24″W
Grape Island	Dodge	Beaver Dam Lake	<0.01	<0.026	43°27′11″N 88°51′20″W
Grassy Island	Vernon	Mississippi River	0.01	0.026	43°39′04″N 91°14′56″W
Gravel Island	Chippewa	Chippewa River	?	?	44°55′10″N 91°26′09″W
Green Island	La Crosse	Mississippi River	0.37	0.96	43°46′59″N 91°14′26″W
Green Island	Oconto	Leigh Flowage	0.01	0.026	45°02′50″N 88°13′55″W
Greenwing Island	Vernon	Mississippi River	<0.01	<0.026	43°40′10″N 91°13′45″W
Grutt Island	Sawyer	Lake Chetac	0.02	0.052	45°42′00″N 91°30′01″W
Hacklin Island	Crawford	Wisconsin River	0.08	0.21	43°02′08″N 90°58′09″W
Hall Island	Dodge	Horicon Marsh	0.01	0.026	43°30′40″N 88°40′35″W
Happy Island	Dunn	Chippewa River	1.65	4.3	44°45′46″N 91°45′47″W
Harris Island	Crawford	Wisconsin River	0.11	0.28	43°04′23″N 90°53′04″W
Hawk Island	Jackson	Black River	0.37	0.96	44°15′13″N 90°52′15″W
Heelsplitter Island	Vernon	Mississippi River	0.01	0.026	43°37′56″N 91°15′30″W
Heron Island	Vernon	Mississippi River	<0.01	<0.026	43°38′53″N 91°14′38″W
High Bank Island	Iowa	Wisconsin River	0.04	0.10	43°11′53″N 90°25′11″W
High Island	Dodge	Beaver Dam Lake	<0.01	<0.026	43°28′40″N 88°52′52″W
Hog Island	Dane	Lake Waubesa	?	?	43°01′17″N 89°19′33″W
Hog Island	Juneau	Unnamed marsh	?	?	44°14′27″N 90°17′14″W
Honey Island	Marathon	Honey Island Flowage	0.08	0.21	44°42′03″N 89°53′26″W
Honeymoon Island	Barron	Red Cedar Lake	<0.01	<0.026	45°35′14″N 91°35′13″W
Horseshoe Island	Iron	Long Lake	<0.01	<0.026	46°15′05″N 90°01′14″W
Hunter Island	Crawford	Mississippi River	0.12	0.31	43°01′33″N 91°09′21″W
Hunter Island	Wood	Wisconsin River	?	?	44°24′44″N 89°49′03″W
Hupf Island	Dodge	Beaver Dam Lake	<0.01	<0.026	43°29′18″N 88°52′29″W
Hurricane Island	Grant	Mississippi River	0.09	0.23	42°39′54″N 90°50′40″W
Ile Le Grand	Marinette	Menominee River	0.36	0.93	45°40′11″N 87°48′27″W
Indernuhle Island	Dodge	Horicon Marsh	0.02	0.052	43°28′13″N 88°36′34″W
Island Number Fifty-four	Buffalo	Mississippi River	0.03	0.078	44°09′07″N 91°46′55″W
Island Number Fifty-three	Buffalo	Mississippi River	0.04	0.10	44°09′20″N 91°47′32″W
Island Number Fifty-two	Buffalo	Mississippi River	0.01	0.026	44°09′23″N 91°47′45″W
Island Number Ninety-one	La Crosse	Mississippi River	0.05	0.13	43°55′38″N 91°21′30″W
Island Number One	Vilas	Little Saint Germain Lake	<0.01	<0.026	45°55′35″N 89°25′54″W
Island Number One Hundred Eighty-one	Grant	Mississippi River	0.05	0.13	42°54′45″N 91°08′34″W
Island Number One Hundred Fifty-nine	Crawford	Mississippi River	?	?	43°13′29″N 91°04′59″W
Island Number One Hundred Fifty-six	Crawford	Mississippi River	<0.01	<0.026	43°15′49″N 91°03′25″W
Island Number One Hundred Forty-six	Vernon	Mississippi River	0.32	0.83	43°21′32″N 91°12′16″W
Island Number One Hundred Forty-three	Crawford & Vernon	Mississippi River	1.11	2.9	43°22′26″N 91°11′20″W
Island Number One Hundred Ninety-two	Grant	Mississippi River	0.08	0.21	42°43′36″N 91°01′33″W
Island Number One Hundred Seventy	Crawford	Mississippi River	<0.01	<0.026	43°04′03″N 91°10′44″W
Island Number One Hundred Seventy-seven	Grant	Mississippi River	0.10	0.26	42°56′10″N 91°08′42″W
Island Number One Hundred Seventy-two	Crawford	Mississippi River	0.97	2.5	43°02′32″N 91°10′04″W
Island Number One Hundred Sixty-seven	Crawford	Mississippi River	0.02	0.052	43°05′27″N 91°10′28″W
Island Number One Hundred Sixty-six	Crawford	Mississippi River	1.66	4.3	43°07′00″N 91°09′39″W
Island Number Seventy-one	Buffalo	Mississippi River	0.07	0.18	44°03′58″N 91°38′46″W
Island Number Sixty-three	Buffalo	Mississippi River	0.23	0.60	44°06′43″N 91°42′08″W
Island Number Two Hundred Eleven	Grant	Mississippi River	?	?	42°38′42″N 90°43′00″W
Island Number Two Hundred Five	Grant	Mississippi River	<0.01	<0.026	42°39′33″N 90°48′16″W
Island Number Two Hundred Nine	Grant	Mississippi River	?	?	42°39′02″N 90°45′24″W
Island Number Two Hundred One	Grant	Mississippi River	0.05	0.13	42°40′22″N 90°52′47″W
Island Number Two Hundred Seven	Grant	Mississippi River	0.03	0.078	42°39′24″N 90°47′31″W
Island Number Two Hundred Twelve	Grant	Mississippi River	?	?	42°37′59″N 90°41′50″W
Island One Hundred Twenty	Vernon	Mississippi River	0.05	0.13	43°40′18″N 91°15′52″W
Islandale	Waukesha	Lac La Belle	0.01	0.026	43°07′22″N 88°30′51″W
Isle La Plume	La Crosse	Mississippi River	0.25	0.65	43°47′35″N 91°15′27″W
Jack Oak Island	Grant	Mississippi River	0.24	0.62	42°41′55″N 90°57′48″W
James Island	Winnebago	Fox River	<0.01	<0.026	44°12′00″N 88°27′50″W
Jewelwing Island	Vernon	Mississippi River	0.01	0.026	43°37′33″N 91°15′49″W
Johnson Island	Trempealeau	Mississippi River	0.15	0.39	44°00′49″N 91°29′07″W
Jossart Island	Oneida	Lake Minocqua	<0.01	<0.026	45°51′57″N 89°41′53″W
Keith Island	Vilas	Big Lake	0.02	0.052	46°09′28″N 89°46′16″W
Keller Island	Buffalo	Mississippi River	0.02	0.052	44°13′11″N 91°51′59″W
Ketchum Island	Grant & Wood	Unnamed marsh	?	?	44°15′52″N 90°19′44″W
Kirsch Island (also known as Fish Camp Island)	Dodge	Beaver Dam Lake	<0.01	<0.026	43°30′24″N 88°52′14″W
Kline Island	Oneida	Lake Minocqua	<0.01	<0.026	45°52′07″N 89°41′53″W
Koch Island	Dodge	Horicon Marsh	0.01	0.026	43°29′00″N 88°36′31″W
Koch Island	Dodge	Sinnissippi Lake	0.02	0.052	43°21′15″N 88°36′26″W
Kopf Island	Dodge	Beaver Dam Lake	<0.01	<0.026	43°27′48″N 88°52′04″W
Kunz Island	Washburn	Long Lake	<0.01	<0.026	45°42′15″N 91°43′07″W
Lib Cross Island	Columbia	Wisconsin River	0.37	0.96	43°28′20″N 89°26′40″W
Little Banana Island	Sawyer	Chippewa Flowage	0.06	0.16	45°55′48″N 91°14′01″W
Little Boom Island	Waupaca	Wolf River	0.01	0.026	44°17′32″N 88°52′00″W
Little Chute Islands	Outagamie	Fox River	0.06	0.16	44°16′29″N 88°17′49″W
Little Goose Island	Dodge	Beaver Dam Lake	<0.01	<0.026	43°26′49″N 88°51′39″W
Little Hoot Island	Vernon	Mississippi River	<0.01	<0.026	43°37′54″N 91°14′47″W
Little Island	Grant	Wisconsin River	0.06	0.16	43°10′31″N 90°38′33″W
Little Island	Oneida	Squash Lake	<0.01	<0.026	45°35′43″N 89°33′32″W
Little Ripley Island	Oneida	Kawaguesaga Lake	<0.01	<0.026	45°52′21″N 89°44′16″W
Little Skunk Island	Dodge	Beaver Dam Lake	<0.01	<0.026	43°29′18″N 88°51′08″W
Log Island	Vernon	Mississippi River	?	?	43°38′06″N 91°13′29″W
Lone Island	Dodge	Fox Lake	<0.01	<0.026	43°35′25″N 88°54′59″W
Lone Island	Washington	Big Cedar Lake	<0.01	<0.026	43°24′14″N 88°15′24″W
Lone Willow Island	Winnebago	Lake Poygan	<0.01	<0.026	44°08′03″N 88°46′12″W
Long Island	Barron	Hemlock Lake	<0.01	<0.026	45°34′08″N 91°33′54″W
Long Island	Iowa	Wisconsin River	0.05	0.13	43°10′59″N 90°01′15″W
Long Island	Marinette	Menominee River	0.03	0.078	45°17′32″N 87°41′25″W
Long Island	Marinette	Menominee River	0.01	0.026	45°40′21″N 87°47′34″W
Long Island	Sauk	Wisconsin River	0.43	1.1	43°09′59″N 90°11′26″W
Long Point	Winnebago	Lake Winnebago	0.02	0.052	43°54′01″N 88°27′02″W
Loon Island	Sawyer	Teal Lake	<0.01	<0.026	46°04′40″N 91°07′00″W
Maggies Island	Marinette & Menominee, Michigan	Menominee River	0.02	0.052	45°19′54″N 87°39′22″W
Majestic Island	Dodge	Beaver Dam Lake	<0.01	<0.026	43°27′34″N 88°52′13″W
Manito Island	Vilas	Manitowish Lake	<0.01	<0.026	46°06′43″N 89°50′03″W
McClary Island	Richland	Wisconsin River	0.05	0.13	43°12′18″N 90°28′35″W
McDowell Island	Waukesha	Okauchee Lake	0.01	0.026	43°08′02″N 88°26′22″W
McFetridge Island	Dodge	Fox Lake	<0.01	<0.026	43°34′57″N 88°55′11″W
McHenry Island	Barron	Red Cedar Lake	<0.01	<0.026	45°36′40″N 91°34′44″W
McNott Island	Sawyer	Teal Lake	0.03	0.078	46°05′09″N 91°06′41″W
Metcalf Island	Sauk	Wisconsin River	0.08	0.21	43°09′46″N 90°06′02″W
Middle Island	Dodge	Beaver Dam Lake	<0.01	<0.026	43°29′13″N 88°52′39″W
Millers Island	Dodge	Beaver Dam Lake	<0.01	<0.026	43°27′39″N 88°53′00″W
Miscauno Island	Marinette	Menominee River	0.15	0.39	45°33′58″N 87°50′10″W
Misling Island	Dodge	Horicon Marsh	0.01	0.026	43°31′23″N 88°40′29″W
Moon Island	Dodge	Beaver Dam Lake	<0.01	<0.026	43°32′13″N 88°55′19″W
Mosquito Island	Dane	Wisconsin River	<0.01	<0.026	43°16′16″N 89°43′02″W
Mudcat Island	Vernon	Mississippi River	<0.01	<0.026	43°38′34″N 91°14′19″W
Muench Island	Buffalo	Mississippi River	0.16	0.41	44°14′45″N 91°53′10″W
Mulligan Island	Grant	Mississippi River	0.02	0.052	42°39′25″N 90°46′09″W
Muscoda Island	Iowa	Wisconsin River	0.04	0.10	43°11′56″N 90°25′25″W
Musquash Island	Vernon	Mississippi River	<0.01	<0.026	43°38′23″N 91°15′08″W
Mussel Island	Vernon	Mississippi River	<0.01	<0.026	43°38′45″N 91°14′44″W
Negro Island	Lincoln	Wisconsin River	0.02	0.052	45°32′16″N 89°33′47″W
Neilson Island	Dodge	Beaver Dam Lake	<0.01	<0.026	43°27′28″N 88°52′29″W
Nekuk Island	Douglas	Saint Louis River	0.03	0.078	46°39′25″N 92°16′34″W
New Island	Dodge	Beaver Dam Lake	<0.01	<0.026	43°30′55″N 88°52′57″W
Newton Island	Crawford	Wisconsin River	0.16	0.41	43°04′27″N 90°52′01″W
Ninemile Island	Pepin	Chippewa River	2.20	5.7	44°40′42″N 91°55′35″W
Nose Peak Island	Marinette	Menominee River	0.02	0.052	45°39′39″N 87°49′33″W
Old Scribbler Island	Vernon	Mississippi River	?	?	43°38′00″N 91°13′36″W
Olmstead Island	Oneida	Tomahawk Lake	0.02	0.052	45°49′55″N 89°40′47″W
Onaway Island	Waupaca	Chain O' Lakes	0.01	0.026	44°20′44″N 89°09′04″W
Ondaig Island	Douglas	Saint Louis River	<0.01	<0.026	46°39′10″N 92°16′27″W
Onemile Island	Dodge	Horicon Marsh	0.02	0.052	43°27′40″N 88°38′23″W
Otter Island	Iowa	Wisconsin River	0.02	0.052	43°11′51″N 89°51′02″W
Otter Island	Vernon	Mississippi River	?	?	43°38′20″N 91°14′11″W
Packwaukee Island	Marquette	Fox River	?	?	43°42′19″N 89°26′01″W
Paines Island	Bayfield	Namekagon Lake	0.07	0.18	46°12′46″N 91°07′07″W
Paradise Island	Iron	Pine Lake	<0.01	<0.026	46°15′51″N 90°08′31″W
Paradise Island	Polk	Balsam Lake	0.01	0.026	45°27′27″N 92°25′49″W
Paradise Island	Sawyer	Teal Lake	0.02	0.052	46°05′22″N 91°05′39″W
Pasque Island	Vernon	Mississippi River	<0.01	<0.026	43°39′56″N 91°13′38″W
Patterson Island	Grant	Wisconsin River	0.07	0.18	43°10′12″N 90°39′55″W
Pelican Island	Buffalo	Mississippi River	0.01	0.026	44°12′46″N 91°51′59″W
Pelican Island	Vernon	Mississippi River	<0.01	<0.026	43°38′44″N 91°14′39″W
Pemebonwon Islands	Marinette	Menominee River	<0.01	<0.026	45°39′15″N 87°49′35″W
Phils Island	Dodge	Horicon Marsh	0.02	0.052	43°32′03″N 88°36′01″W
Picnic Island	Oneida	Tomahawk Lake	<0.01	<0.026	45°48′57″N 89°38′43″W
Pigeon Island	La Crosse	Mississippi River	0.14	0.36	43°58′04″N 91°24′11″W
Pine Island	Columbia	Wisconsin River	0.40	1.0	43°32′59″N 89°34′43″W
Pine Island	Marathon	Mosinee Flowage	0.04	0.10	44°48′03″N 89°42′05″W
Pine Island	Polk	Balsam Lake	<0.01	<0.026	45°27′35″N 92°26′54″W
Pine Island	Rusk	Flambeau River	0.06	0.16	45°21′12″N 91°12′39″W
Pine Island	Sawyer	Teal Lake	0.01	0.026	46°04′46″N 91°07′11″W
Pleasant Island	Walworth	Middle Lake	0.01	0.026	42°46′12″N 88°33′53″W
Pleasure Island	Wood	Wisconsin River	0.03	0.078	44°26′46″N 89°43′48″W
Pool Nine Island	Crawford	Mississippi River	1.03	2.7	43°18′11″N 91°05′24″W
Poplar Island	Dodge	Beaver Dam Lake	<0.01	<0.026	43°27′48″N 88°53′01″W
Popple Island	Dodge	Horicon Marsh	<0.01	<0.026	43°28′29″N 88°39′12″W
Popple Island	Sawyer	Chippewa Flowage	<0.01	<0.026	45°57′39″N 91°09′58″W
Pork Barrel Island	Sawyer	Chippewa Flowage	0.01	0.026	45°56′54″N 91°09′38″W
Pumpkinseed Island	Vernon	Mississippi River	0.01	0.026	43°37′53″N 91°14′31″W
Radloff Island	Dodge	Sinnissippi Lake	0.08	0.21	43°21′57″N 88°36′39″W
Radloff Islands	Dodge	Horicon Marsh	0.02	0.052	43°30′53″N 88°40′53″W
Rank Island	Dodge	Horicon Marsh	0.01	0.026	43°36′06″N 88°40′01″W
Raspberry Island	Sawyer	Teal Lake	0.02	0.052	46°04′52″N 91°06′27″W
Red Oak Ridge	La Crosse	Mississippi River	0.09	0.23	43°53′14″N 91°17′42″W
Redwing Island	Vernon	Mississippi River	?	?	43°37′51″N 91°13′49″W
Rice Island	Washburn	Long Lake	?	?	45°43′30″N 91°42′26″W
Robarge Island	Barron	Hemlock Lake	<0.01	<0.026	45°34′03″N 91°34′29″W
Robbins Island	Florence	North Lake	0.01	0.026	45°54′10″N 88°08′18″W
Rock Island	Lincoln	Wisconsin River	<0.01	<0.026	45°12′10″N 89°45′17″W
Rock Island	Polk	Balsam Lake	<0.01	<0.026	45°27′40″N 92°24′02″W
Rock Island	Polk	Saint Croix River	<0.01	<0.026	45°22′22″N 92°40′40″W
Rosebrook Island	Grant	Mississippi River	0.07	0.18	42°39′27″N 90°47′07″W
Rosebud Island	La Crosse	Mississippi River	0.28	0.73	43°54′26″N 91°15′43″W
Round Island	Dodge	Beaver Dam Lake	<0.01	<0.026	43°28′24″N 88°51′06″W
Round Island	Marinette	Menominee River	0.01	0.026	45°29′42″N 87°48′00″W
Rudebush Island	Dodge	Horicon Marsh	0.01	0.026	43°29′29″N 88°36′25″W
Rudys Island	Sawyer	Chippewa Flowage	<0.01	<0.026	45°55′26″N 91°08′59″W
Sager Island	Dodge	Fox Lake	0.01	0.026	43°34′37″N 88°53′49″W
Saint Feriole Island	Crawford	Mississippi River	0.49	1.3	43°03′25″N 91°09′20″W
Sand Island	Sawyer	Chippewa Flowage	<0.01	<0.026	45°55′06″N 91°14′10″W
Saturday Islands	Menominee	Wolf River	0.01	0.026	45°01′26″N 88°39′38″W
Schmidt Island	Crawford	Mississippi River	0.07	0.18	43°00′54″N 91°09′16″W
Scott Island	Sawyer	Chippewa Flowage	0.49	1.3	45°55′12″N 91°12′09″W
Scout Island	Washburn	Shell Lake	0.05	0.13	45°43′35″N 91°54′40″W
Scrogum Island	Crawford	Mississippi River	0.45	1.2	43°04′30″N 91°10′16″W
Second Stony Island	Dodge	Horicon Marsh	<0.01	<0.026	43°29′06″N 88°37′21″W
Seering Island	Dodge	Horicon Marsh	<0.01	<0.026	43°28′37″N 88°39′21″W
Sheep Island	Columbia	Park Lake	0.01	0.026	43°32′55″N 89°17′02″W
Sixty Islands	Marinette	Menominee River	0.01	0.026	45°27′38″N 87°49′30″W
Slingshot Island	Vernon	Mississippi River	<0.01	<0.026	43°39′51″N 91°14′11″W
Small Fry Island	Vernon	Mississippi River	?	?	43°38′33″N 91°13′44″W
Small Island	Dodge	Beaver Dam Lake	<0.01	<0.026	43°29′28″N 88°52′18″W
Snake Island	Crawford	Mississippi River	0.06	0.16	43°00′11″N 91°09′16″W
Snake Tongue Island	Vernon	Mississippi River	0.01	0.026	43°39′07″N 91°15′26″W
Snipe Island	Buffalo	Mississippi River	0.03	0.078	44°11′39″N 91°50′27″W
Snipe Island	Dodge	Beaver Dam Lake	<0.01	<0.026	43°27′36″N 88°52′28″W
Soft Shell Island	Vernon	Mississippi River	0.36	0.93	43°37′52″N 91°15′49″W
Squak Island	Dodge	Horicon Marsh	0.01	0.026	43°31′44″N 88°40′16″W
Steamboat Island	Dodge	Horicon Marsh	<0.01	<0.026	43°30′23″N 88°38′47″W
Steamboat Island	Grant	Wisconsin River	0.04	0.10	43°12′35″N 90°32′33″W
Stephenson Island	Marinette	Menominee River	0.02	0.052	45°06′07″N 87°37′45″W
Stone Island	Dodge	Sinnissippi Lake	0.01	0.026	43°22′15″N 88°36′56″W
Stony Island	Dodge	Rock River	<0.01	<0.026	43°28′46″N 88°38′53″W
Stony Island	Dodge	Horicon Marsh	<0.01	<0.026	43°36′57″N 88°39′14″W
Stout Island	Barron	Red Cedar Lake	0.02	0.052	45°36′41″N 91°35′17″W
Strawberry Island	Dodge	Horicon Marsh	0.01	0.026	43°30′40″N 88°39′31″W
Strawberry Island	Vilas	Flambeau Lake	0.04	0.10	45°57′59″N 89°55′11″W
Stroebe Island	Winnebago	Fox River	0.11	0.28	44°14′06″N 88°27′17″W
Stumpf Island	Grant	Mississippi River	0.31	0.80	42°31′55″N 90°37′54″W
Sunfish Island	Vernon	Mississippi River	<0.01	<0.026	43°40′09″N 91°13′32″W
Sunset Island	Vernon	Mississippi River	<0.01	<0.026	43°38′37″N 91°14′43″W
Sweet Island	Iowa	Wisconsin River	0.02	0.052	43°08′52″N 90°04′02″W
Tadpole Island	Vernon	Mississippi River	<0.01	<0.026	43°38′27″N 91°14′13″W
Taylor Island	Jackson	Unnamed marsh	?	?	44°11′19″N 90°23′24″W
Taylor Island	La Crosse	Mississippi River	0.06	0.16	43°49′35″N 91°15′54″W
Terrell Island	Winnebago	Lake Butte des Morts	?	?	44°04′18″N 88°39′47″W
Tivoli Island	Jefferson	Rock River	0.01	0.026	43°11′16″N 88°42′23″W
Trapping Island	Vernon	Mississippi River	<0.01	<0.026	43°38′46″N 91°14′33″W
Treasure Island	Waukesha	Pine Lake	0.01	0.026	43°06′34″N 88°23′03″W
Trumbull Island	Richland	Wisconsin River	0.15	0.39	43°10′23″N 90°39′50″W
Turtle Island	Vernon	Mississippi River	0.02	0.052	43°40′00″N 91°15′19″W
Twin Island	Marinette	Menominee River	0.12	0.31	45°16′03″N 87°42′16″W
Twin Islands	Sauk	Wisconsin River	<0.01	<0.026	43°13′29″N 89°49′17″W
Twin Islands	Walworth	Lake Beulah	0.01	0.026	42°49′19″N 88°23′31″W
Van Tassle Island	Jackson	Unnamed marsh	?	?	44°19′17″N 90°19′57″W
Virgin Island	Oconto	Wheeler Lake	<0.01	<0.026	45°19′21″N 88°28′24″W
Wagon Wheel Island	Sawyer	Chippewa Flowage	<0.01	<0.026	45°54′13″N 91°07′16″W
Wahbegon Island	Douglas	Saint Louis River	0.01	0.026	46°39′07″N 92°16′29″W
Wahcoutah Island	Pepin	Chippewa River	0.09	0.23	44°27′39″N 92°03′55″W
Wallace Island	Polk	Wapogasset Lake	0.06	0.16	45°20′20″N 92°25′40″W
Water Snake Island	Buffalo	Mississippi River	0.02	0.052	44°12′32″N 91°50′51″W
Wayside Island	Dodge	Beaver Dam Lake	<0.01	<0.026	43°30′46″N 88°52′45″W
Weniger Island	Crawford	Wisconsin River	0.32	0.83	42°59′45″N 91°03′41″W
Westerberg Island	Columbia	Wisconsin River	0.06	0.16	43°31′55″N 89°28′05″W
Wilcox Island	Douglas	Saint Croix Flowage	0.34	0.88	46°15′37″N 91°50′47″W
Williams Island	Waupaca	Chain O' Lakes	<0.01	<0.026	44°20′35″N 89°08′56″W
Willow Island	Chippewa	Chippewa River	<0.01	<0.026	45°06′57″N 91°12′28″W
Willow Island	Dodge	Horicon Marsh	<0.01	<0.026	43°30′41″N 88°40′01″W
Willow Sprig Island	Vernon	Mississippi River	0.11	0.28	43°38′15″N 91°15′39″W
Wolf Island	Sawyer	Moose Lake	0.02	0.052	46°01′48″N 91°01′20″W
Woods Island	Forest	Pickerel Lake	<0.01	<0.026	45°24′06″N 88°55′13″W
Zacharias Island	Green Lake & Marquette	Fox River	2.22	5.7	43°44′46″N 89°14′52″W
Alcatraz Island* (See Below Reference)	Adams County & Juneau County	Castle Rock Lake	0.00781	0.0202	43°55′39″N 89°58′34″W

- Alcatraz Island in Castle Rock Lake, Juneau/Adams County, WI, is an uninhabited small island and surrounding sandbar located off the southeastern shore of Castle Rock Lake near Buckhorn State Park in Wisconsin. While not officially named and recognized, it is a local hotspot and a staple in the south-central region of Wisconsin. It is known for summer weekend and holiday boat tail-gating and is a known boat gathering place in the greater Wisconsin Dells region.

== See also ==
- Geography of Wisconsin
- Great Lakes
- Islands of the Midwest
