= Little Hoot =

Little Hoot may refer to:

- Little Hoot, a character in the television series Wide-Eye
- Little Hoot, a 2009 book by Amy Krouse Rosenthal
- Little Hoot Island, an island in Wisconsin
