= Bear Island (Wisconsin) =

Island in Wisconsin, United States

Coordinates: 47°00′58″N 090°45′28″W

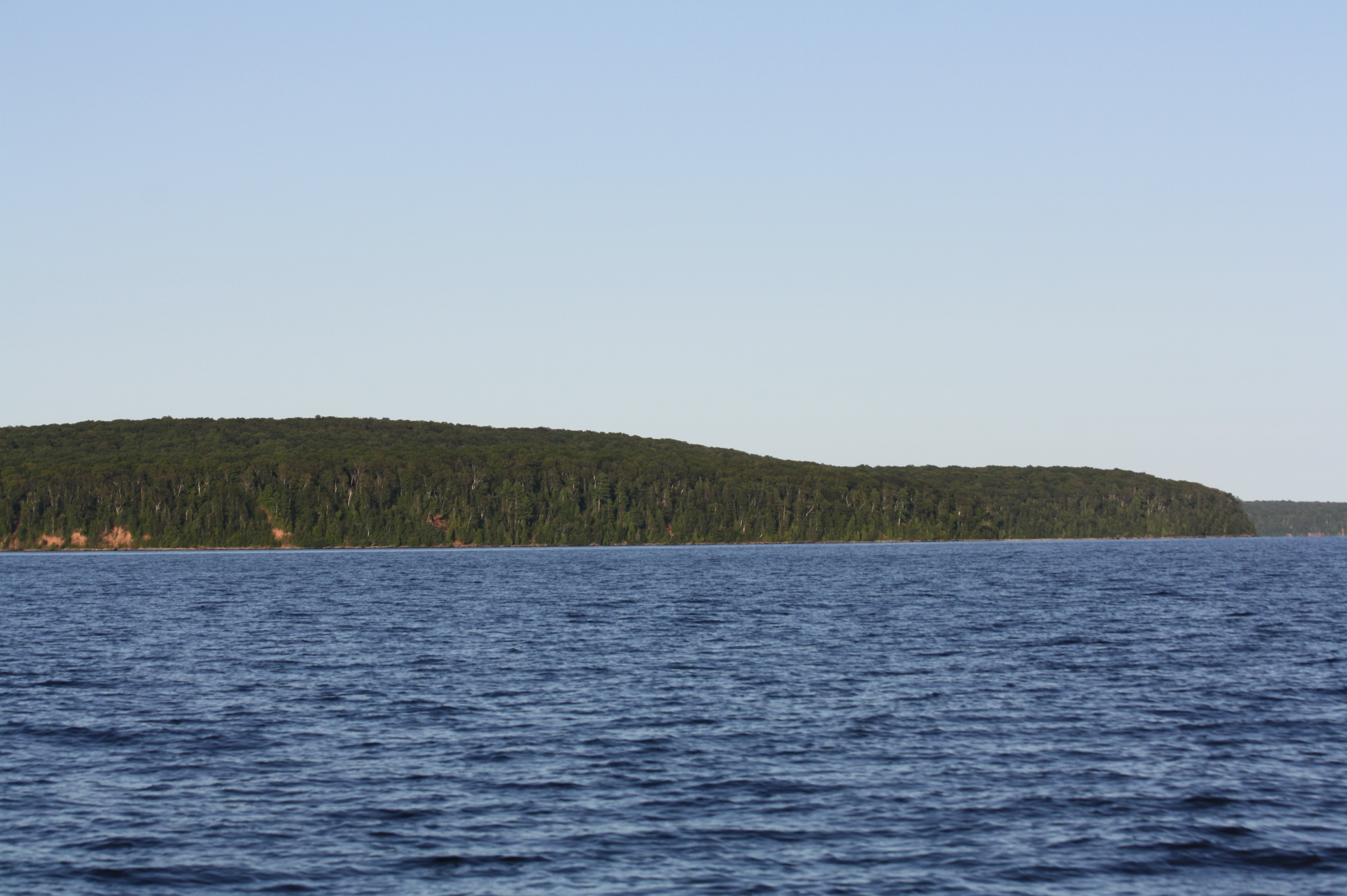
Bear Island (bear "head" is right and "body" is left")

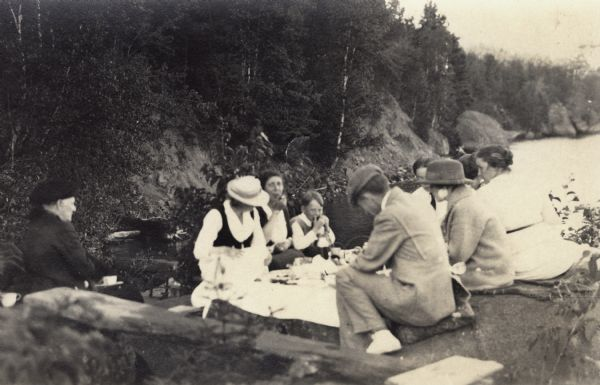
Picnic on Bear Island in 1916

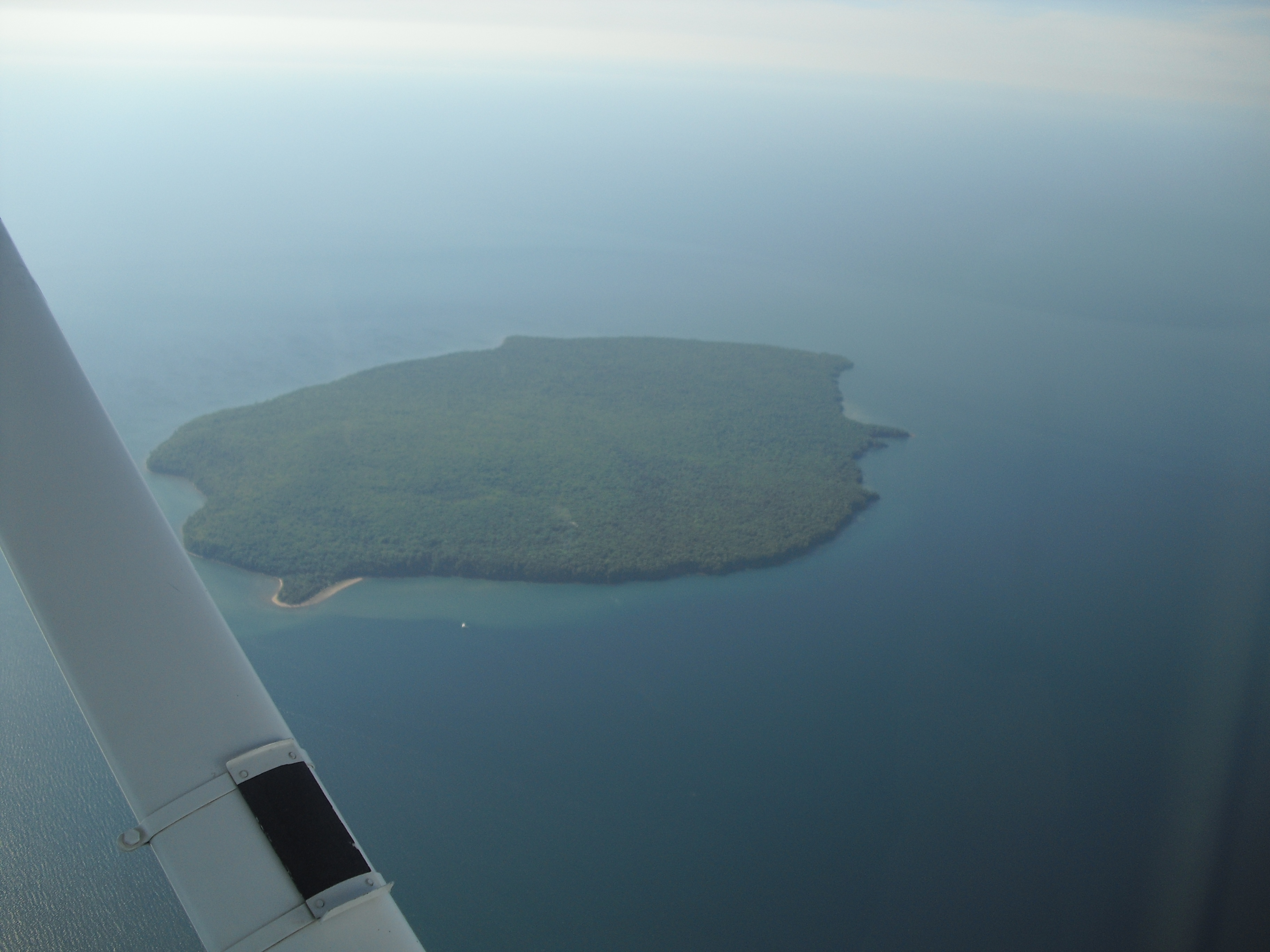
Aerial view of Bear Island, looking north. The island's South Point is in the foreground.

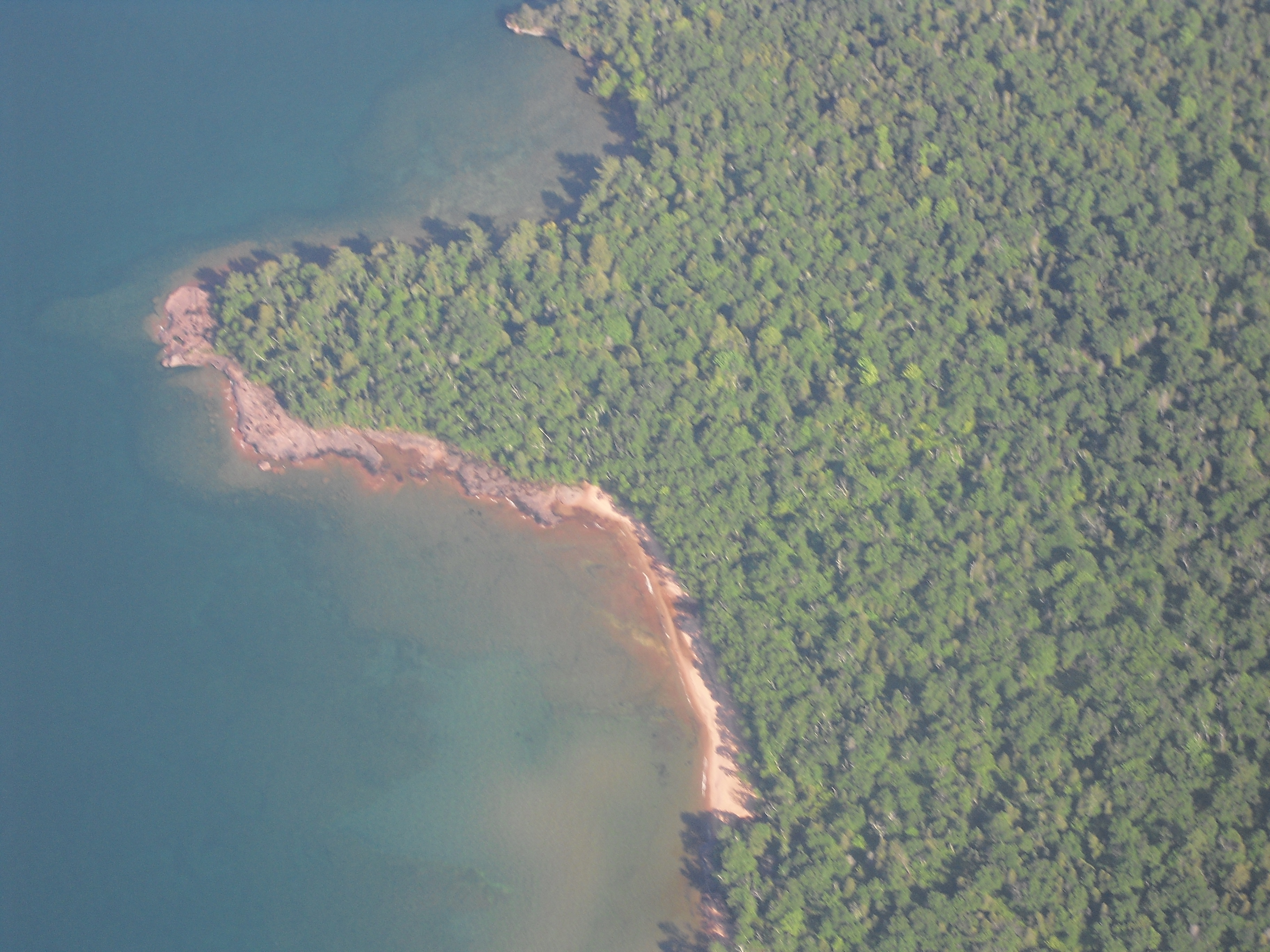
Aerial view of the East Point and beach.

Bear Island is one of the Apostle Islands of northern Wisconsin in Lake Superior, and is part of the Apostle Islands National Lakeshore. Unlike nearby Madeline Island, it is not open to commercial development. There is another Bear Island in Balsam Lake.
