= Kawaguesaga Lake =

Lake in Wisconsin, United States

- Location within Wisconsin Location within the United States
- Location: Oneida County, Wisconsin
- Coordinates: 45°52′30″N 089°44′48″W
- Primary inflows: Tomahawk River
- Primary outflows: Tomahawk River
- Basin countries: United States
- Surface area: 670 acres (270 ha)
- Max. depth: 44 ft (13 m)
- Water volume: 11,881 acre⋅ft (14.655×10^{6} m^{3})

Kawaguesaga Lake is a lake in Oneida County, Wisconsin near Minocqua. Its inflow and outflow is the Tomahawk River. It is contiguous with Minocqua Lake.
