= Horicon Marsh =

National State Wildlife Area, Dodge and Fond du Lac counties, Wisconsin

Horicon National Wildlife Refuge/Horicon Marsh State Wildlife Area
- IUCN category IV (habitat/species management area)
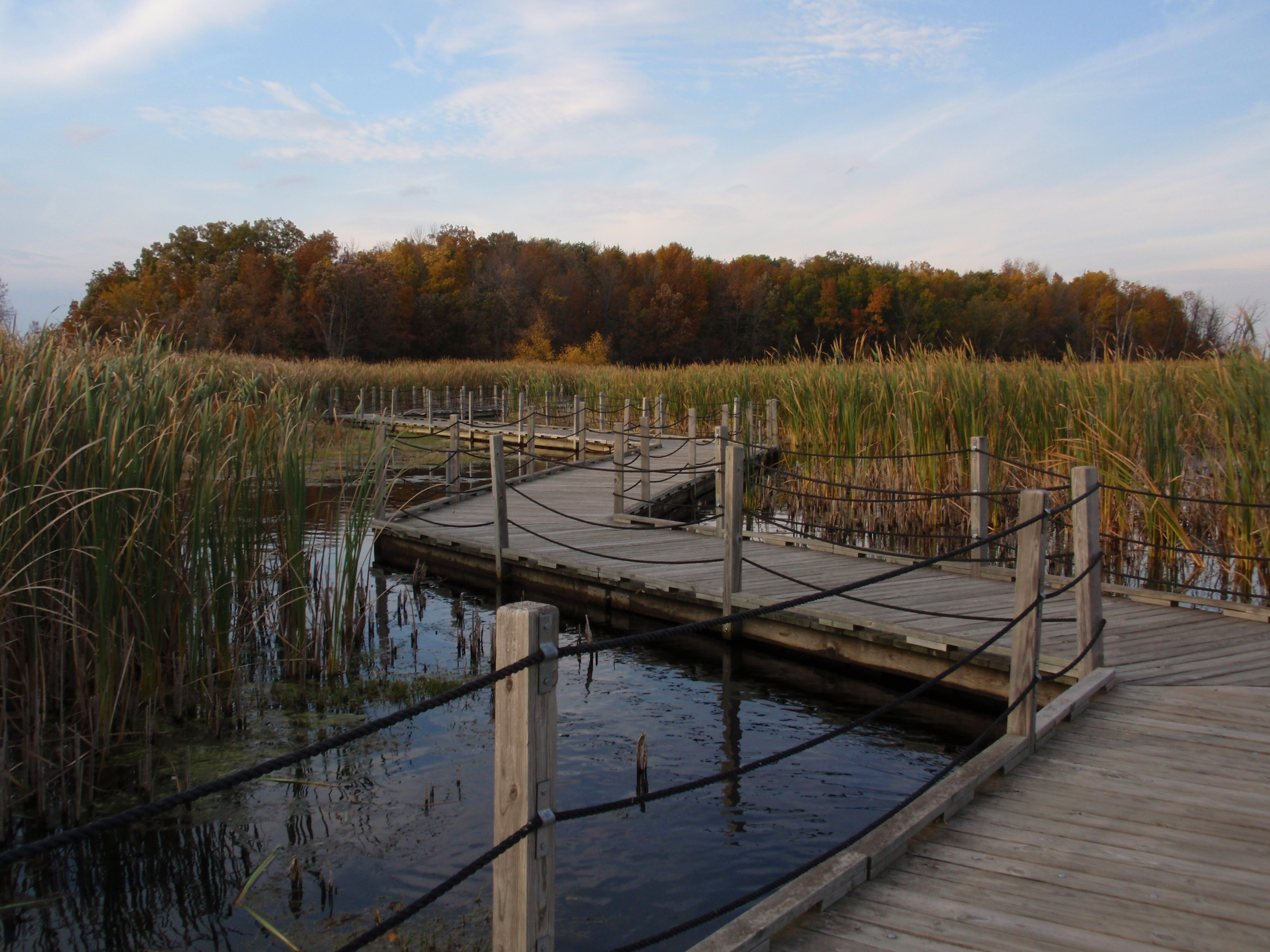
- A boardwalk in the marsh

- Location within Wisconsin Location within the United States
- Interactive map of Horicon National Wildlife Refuge/Horicon Marsh State Wildlife Area
- Location: Dodge, Fond du Lac counties, Wisconsin, United States
- Nearest city: Waupun, Wisconsin
- Coordinates: 43.5497141°N 88.6559380°W
- Area: 21,400 acres (87 km^{2})
- Established: 1941
- Governing body: U.S. Fish and Wildlife Service Wisconsin Department of Natural Resources
- Website: Horicon Marsh National Wildlife Refuge

Ramsar Wetland
- Designated: 12 April 1990
- Reference no.: 511

Horicon Marsh is a marsh located in northern Dodge and southern Fond du Lac counties of Wisconsin. It is the site of both a national and a state wildlife refuge.

== Geological history ==
Horicon Marsh was created by the Green Bay lobe of the Wisconsin glaciation during the Pleistocene era. The glacier, during its advance, created many drumlins (a glacial landform) in the region, many of which have become the islands of Horicon Marsh. The marsh and surrounding Dodge County have the highest concentration of drumlins in the world.

During the glacier's retreat, a moraine was created, forming a natural dam holding back the waters from the melting glacier and forming Glacial Lake Horicon. The Rock River slowly eroded the moraine, and the lake drained. As the levels of silt, clay and peat accumulated in the former lake's basin, the Horicon Marsh was formed.

The Horicon Marsh State Wildlife Area is one of nine units of the Ice Age National Scientific Reserve system, being considered to contain unique, representative evidence of the Ice Age of the Pleistocene era.

== Inhabited history ==
The Horicon Marsh area has been inhabited by humans, including the Paleo-Indians, the Hopewellian people and the Mound Builders, since the ending of the last Ice Age. Dozens of 1200-year-old effigy mounds were built by the Mound Builders in the surrounding low ridges. Arrowheads have been found dating to 12,000 years ago. Later the region was inhabited by the Potawotomi, primarily to the east of the marsh, and the Ho-Chunk to the west. Seven well-traveled Native American foot trails met at the southern end of the marsh at the present location of the city of Horicon.

When Europeans first arrived in the area, they named the marsh "The Great Marsh of the Winnebagos". The first permanent modern settlement along the marsh was the town of Horicon. In 1846, a dam was built to power the town's first sawmill. The dam held the water in the marsh, causing the water level to rise by nine feet. The "marsh" was called Lake Horicon, and was, at the time, called the largest man-made lake in the world. In 1869, the dam was torn down by order of the State Supreme Court, which ruled in favor of landowners whose land had been flooded. The area became a marsh once more. In 1883, two sportsmen's clubs reported huge flocks of geese in the marsh, and stated that 500,000 ducks hatched annually, and 30,000 muskrats and mink were trapped in the southern half of the marsh. Both birds and hunters flocked to the area, and the local duck population was devastated. From 1910 to 1914, an attempt was made to drain the marsh and convert it into farmland; these attempts failed, and afterwards the land was widely considered to be useless. In November 1933, an accidentally caused wildfire would destroy much of Horicon Marsh; necessitating a restoration project. It was re-opened to the public in April 1935.

== Horicon National Wildlife Refuge ==
In 1927, the Wisconsin State Legislature, after pressure from conservationists beginning in 1921, passed the Horicon Marsh Wildlife Refuge Bill, providing for the construction of a dam to raise the water to normal levels and for the acquisition of the land by the government. During the 1940s, the United States Fish and Wildlife Service bought the northern portions of the marsh. Today the northern two-thirds, approximately 21,400 acres (87 km^{2}), forms the Horicon National Wildlife Refuge. It is managed by the U.S. Fish and Wildlife Service.

Presently, the marsh is 32,000 acres (130 km^{2}) in area, most of it open water and cattail marsh. The southern third, approximately 11,000 acres (45 km^{2}), is owned by the state of Wisconsin and forms the Horicon Marsh State Wildlife Area, which was established as a nesting area for waterfowl and resting area for migratory birds. It is managed by the Wisconsin Department of Natural Resources (DNR). Millions of waterfowl, including over 200,000 Canada geese, migrate through the marsh.

The refuges are habitats for many species of birds, especially ducks, pelicans, great blue herons, and Canada geese (which have become increasingly common since the 1980s), as well as fish, frogs, snakes, turtles, muskrats, insects and plants.

Horicon Marsh was designated a Ramsar site on December 4, 1990.

== Miscellaneous ==
In 1976, the brass band of Walden III Middle and High School in Racine, Wisconsin, was named the Horicon Horns Band after school co-founder and co-director Jackson Parker compared the new band's sound to the honking of geese at Horicon Marsh. The band would improve greatly over the years, and went on to become a staple of musical entertainment in Racine, even performing at the state capital for Kimberly Plache and at Disneyworld.

== Gallery ==
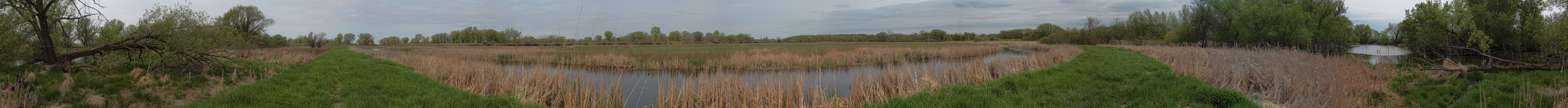
Horicon Marsh in the spring
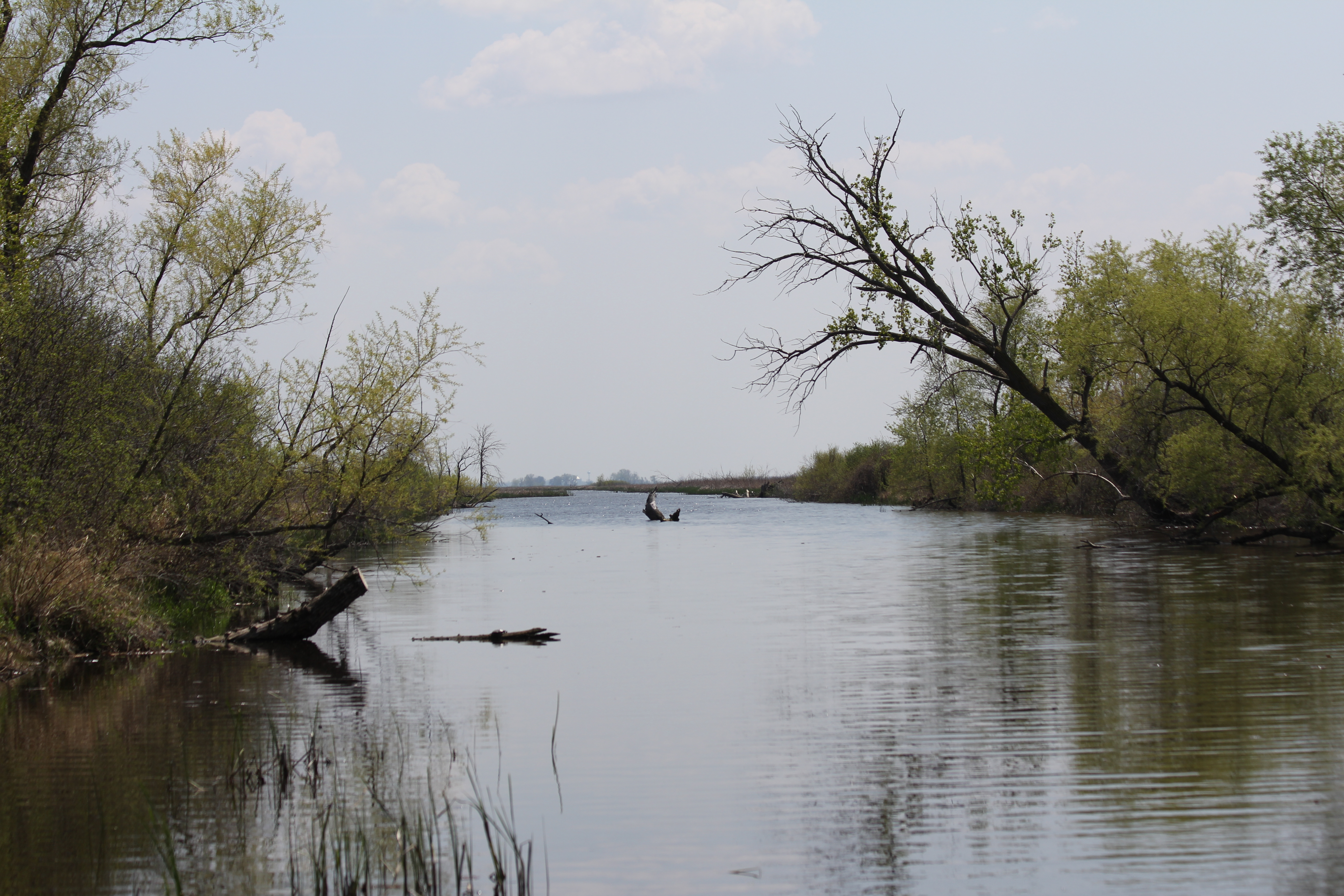
Central waterway in the marsh

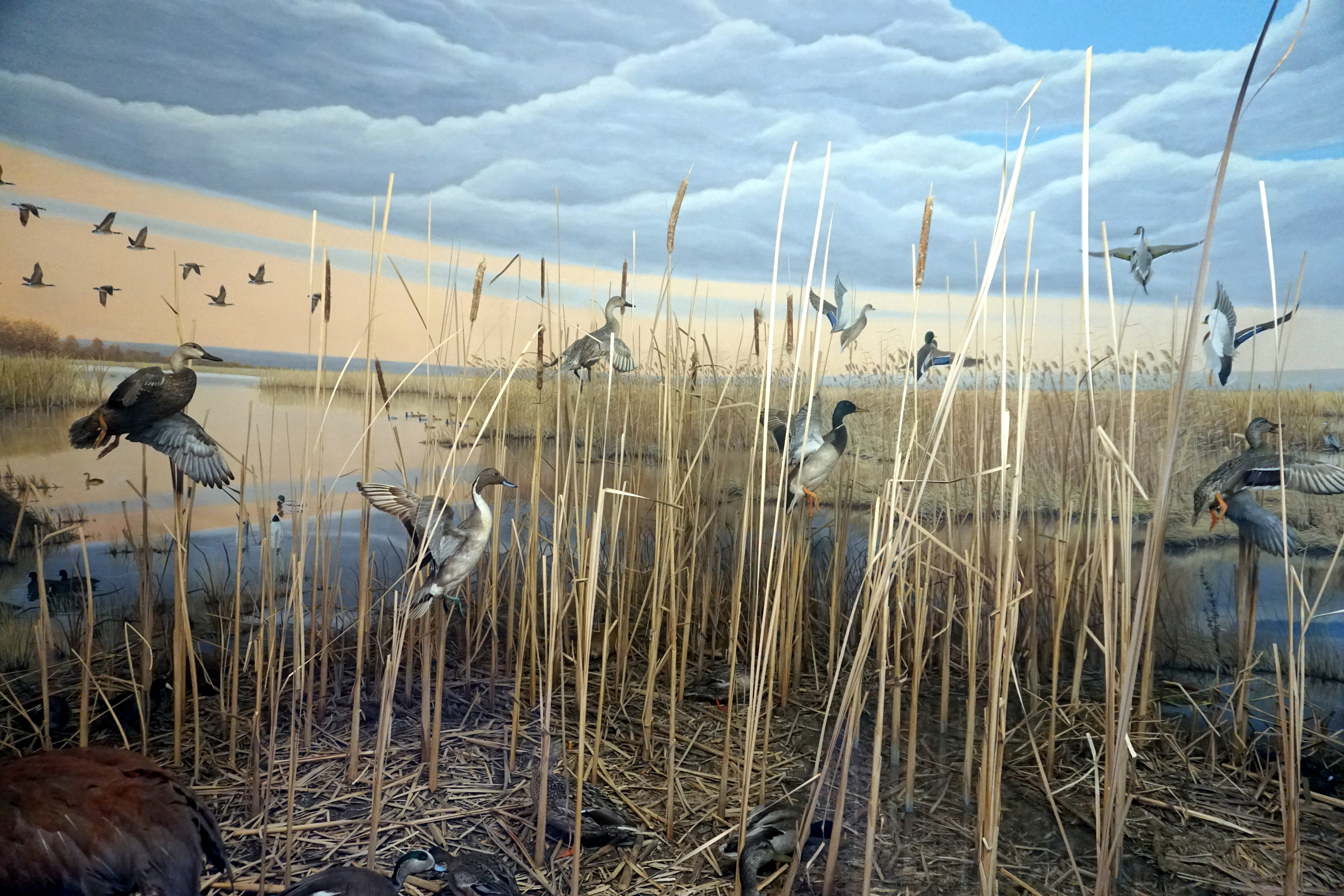
The Horicon Marsh: Dodge County, Wisconsin diorama at the Milwaukee Public Museum

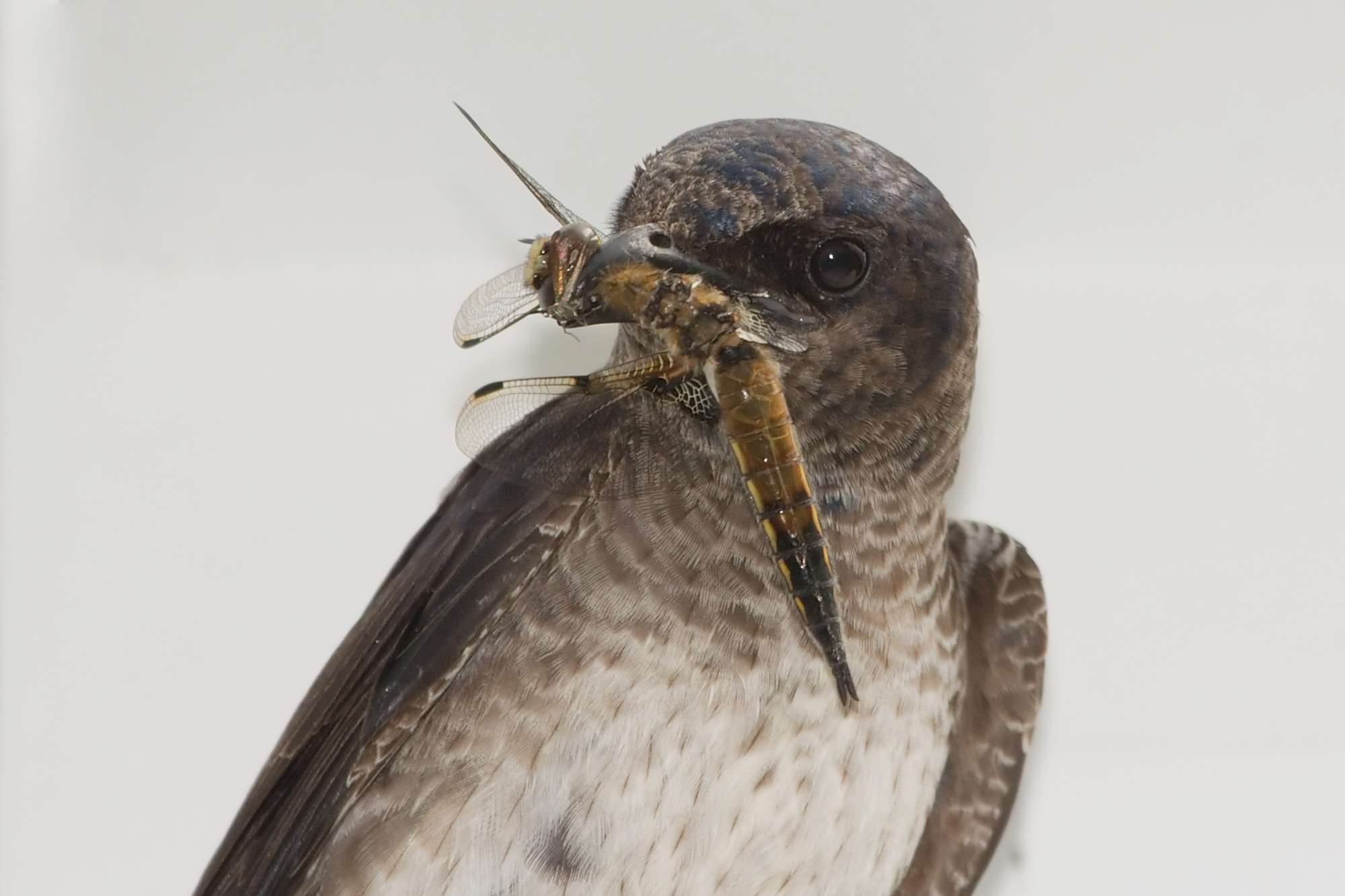
A purple martin captured a four spotted chaser

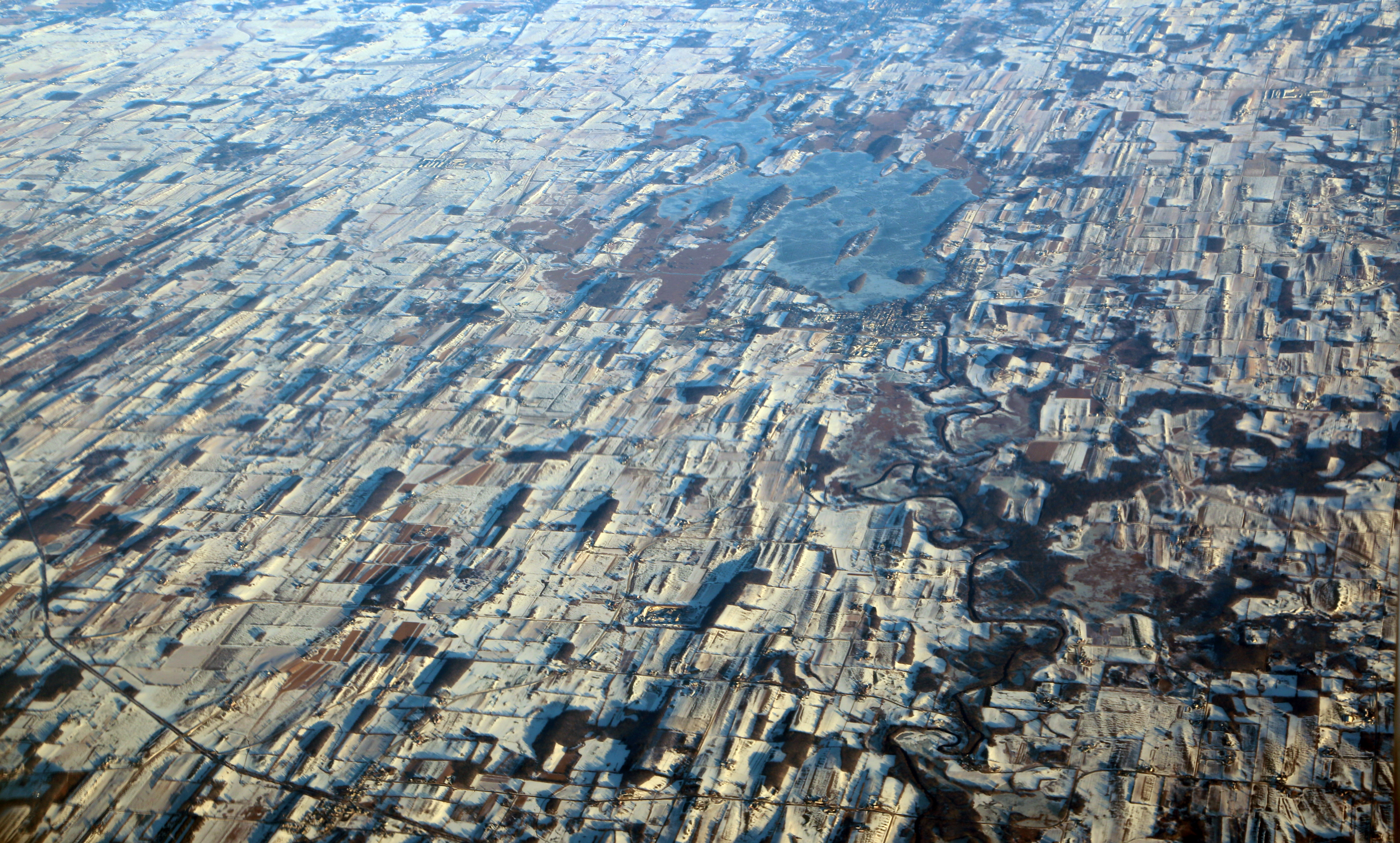
Drumlins around Horicon Marsh, December 2016. The Rock River can be seen draining Sinissippi Lake, with Hustisford gallery visible at the latter's southern edge
