= Namekagon Lake =

Lake in the state of Wisconsin, United States

- Location within Wisconsin Location within the United States
- Location: Bayfield County, Wisconsin near Cable, Wisconsin
- Coordinates: 46°13′12″N 91°6′36″W
- Primary inflows: Namekagon River
- Basin countries: United States
- Surface area: Lake Namekagon: 2,897 acres (1,172.37 ha); Chain: 3,227 acres (1,305.92 ha)
- Average depth: 38 ft (12 m)
- Max. depth: 51 ft (16 m)
- Water volume: 52,032 acre-feet (64,181,000 m^{3})
- Shore length^{1}: 43.67 mi (70 km)
- Surface elevation: 1,394 ft (425 m)
- Islands: Della Is., Paines Is., Champaign Is., Gov. Is., Ch. Namakagon Is., Anderson Is.
- Settlements: Near Cable, Wisconsin, Grandview, Wisconsin, Clam Lake, Wisconsin
- ^{1} Shore length is not a well-defined measure.

Lake Namekagon is a chain of lakes located in the Chequamegon National Forest in northern Wisconsin, United States. Namekagon has much wildlife and forested habitat.

== Accommodations ==
There are several restaurants and resorts located on Namekagon Lake, including Lakewoods and Telemark Pointe. Restaurants include Pla-Mor and the Loon Saloon.

== Wildlife ==
Fish species include crappie, northern pike, and walleye. Namekagon Lake is also home to many deer and other species of animals and plants.

== Spelling ==
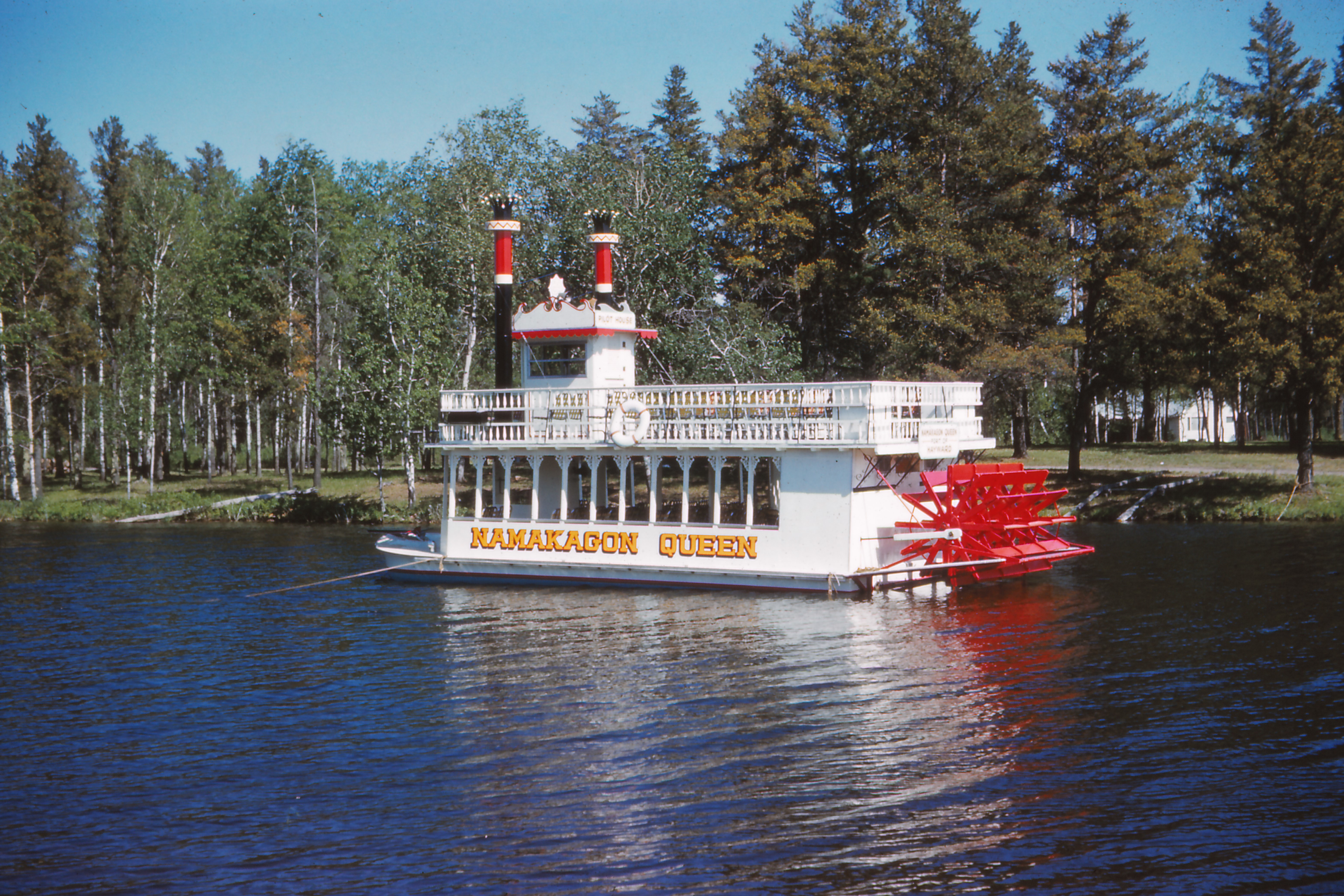
Namakagon Queen, Hayward, Wisconsin, June 1961

The spellings "Namekagon" and "Namakagon" are both used. "Namekagon," with the fourth letter being an "e," is the more common spelling, especially concerning the Namekagon River that flows out of Lake Namakagon. The spelling of "Namakagon", however, with the fourth letter being an "a", is a common spelling in the upper reaches of the Namekagon River area, especially concerning Lake Namakagon, whose lake association is called the "Namakagon Lake Association." Also, from the 1960s to the 1980s, a river boat named the Namakagon Queen was located in Hayward, Wisconsin, and provided tourists with tours of the "Namekagon/Namekagon River."
