= Lake Minocqua =

Lake in Oneida County, Wisconsin, United States

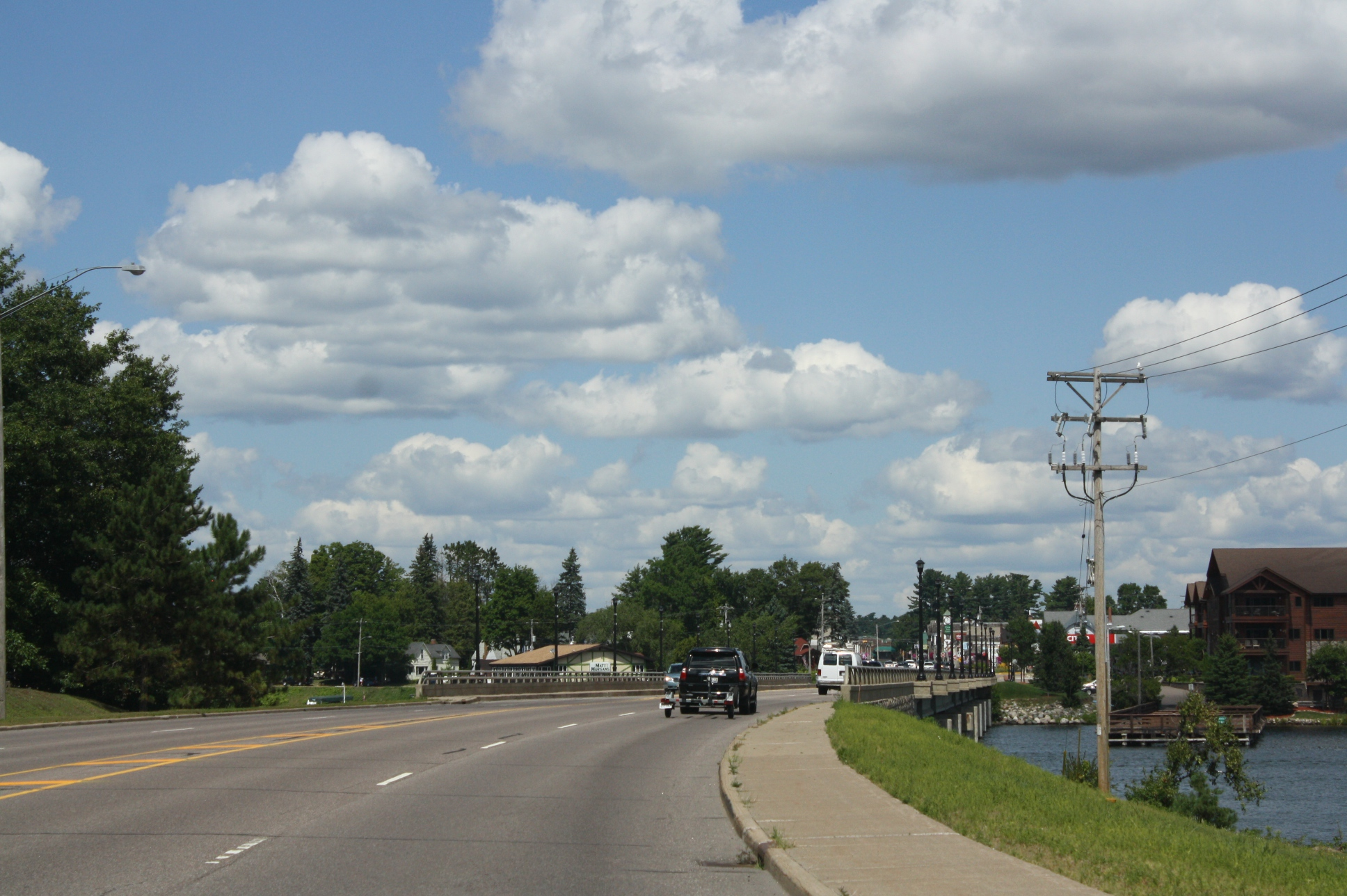
- Bridge over Lake Minocqua

- Location within Wisconsin Location within the United States
- Location: Oneida County, Wisconsin
- Coordinates: 45°52′16″N 089°41′44″W
- Basin countries: United States
- Surface area: 1,360 acres (550 ha)
- Average depth: 23 ft (7.0 m)
- Max. depth: 60 ft (18 m)
- Residence time: 1.5 years
- Surface elevation: 1,585 feet (483 m)

Lake Minocqua is a freshwater natural drainage lake in northern Oneida County, Wisconsin. It is 1360 acres (5.5 km^{2}) in area, with an average depth of 23 feet (7 m) and a maximum depth of 60 feet (18.3 m).

The name Minocqua is derived the Ojibwe language. Varying accounts trace the name to a translation for "good woman" with others claiming the translation means "noon-day rest". It resides between the towns of Minocqua and Woodruff. The area is located in the "Lakeland" area in Northern Wisconsin, and is a major tourist location. To the west Lake Minocqua is connected to Lake Kawaguesaga, both of the lakes water levels are controlled by the Minocqua Dam.

== Physical aspects ==
Lake Minocqua is a 1,339-acre (542 ha) lake found in Northern Wisconsin, located at 45°52′16″N 089°41′44″W. It has a maximum depth of 60 ft (18 m) and a mean depth of 23 ft (7.0 m). The lake has a shoreline of 15.68 miles (25.23 km) without islands, and 19.08 miles (30.71 km) with islands included. The volume of the lake is 10.2 billion us gallons (8,493,276,683 imperial gallons). The bottom sediment of the lake is composed of sand (65%), muck (16%), rock (4%), and gravel (15%). The hydrologic lake type of Lake Minocqua is drainage. The lake surrounds the town of Minocqua and there is a bridge that crosses over the lake towards its southwestern border. Water inflow to the lake through two main sources, Minocqua Thoroughfare and Tomahawk Thoroughfare. The lake flows into the Tomahawk River and other surround lakes, such as Mid Lake, with the average residence time for water in the lake being around 1.5 years. The elevation of the lake reaches 1,585 ft (483 m). Lake Minocqua is divided into three basins (Northwest basin, Southwest basin, and East basin) and is home to multiple islands.

=== Islands ===
- School House Island. Located on the northern part of the lake in the west basin, the shoreland area is approximately 50% developed and 50% shallow marsh wetland habitat. The shoreland area around the island is approximately 90% wooded and 10% developed. There are two piers and one well-hidden house
- Clumb’s Island. Located in the east basin, south of Huber Bay. The shoreland area around the island is approximately 90% wooded and 10% developed, and one well-hidden house.
- Kline Island. This is a small island directly north of Jossart Island in the east basin of the lake. The island is nearly 100% wooded with a small cabin that is concealed behind trees.
- Jossart Island. Located in the east basin directly south of Kline Island. The shoreland area around the island is approximately 90% wooded and 10% developed. There is one boat house present.
- Fisher’s Island. As the largest island on Minocqua Lake, it is located in the central part of the east basin. Largely wooded areas and uninhabited.
- Crescent Island. This is a small island east of Fisher’s Island. Shoreland area around the island is 100% wooded. Also uninhabited.

The lake's islands are habitat to a variety of fish and wildlife species.

=== Water quality ===
The hardness of Lake Minocqua falls between 45 and 50 mg/L (0.0028 and 0.0031 lb/cu ft) as CaCO_{3} which means the water classifies as "soft". The lake is typically classified as a dimictic lake. The summer thermocline occurs in late June and lasts until the end of September and happens between 13 and 30 feet (4.0 and 9.1 m), experiencing bottom lake temperature that average from 46 to 50 °F (8 to 10 °C).

== Biological aspects ==
=== Native species ===
The native fish species most common in Lake Minoqua are as follows:

- Muskellunge (Esox masquinongy)
- Largemouth Bass (Micropterus salmoides)
- Smallmouth Bass (Micropterus dolomieu)
- Northern Pike (Esox lucius)
- Walleye (Sander vitreus)

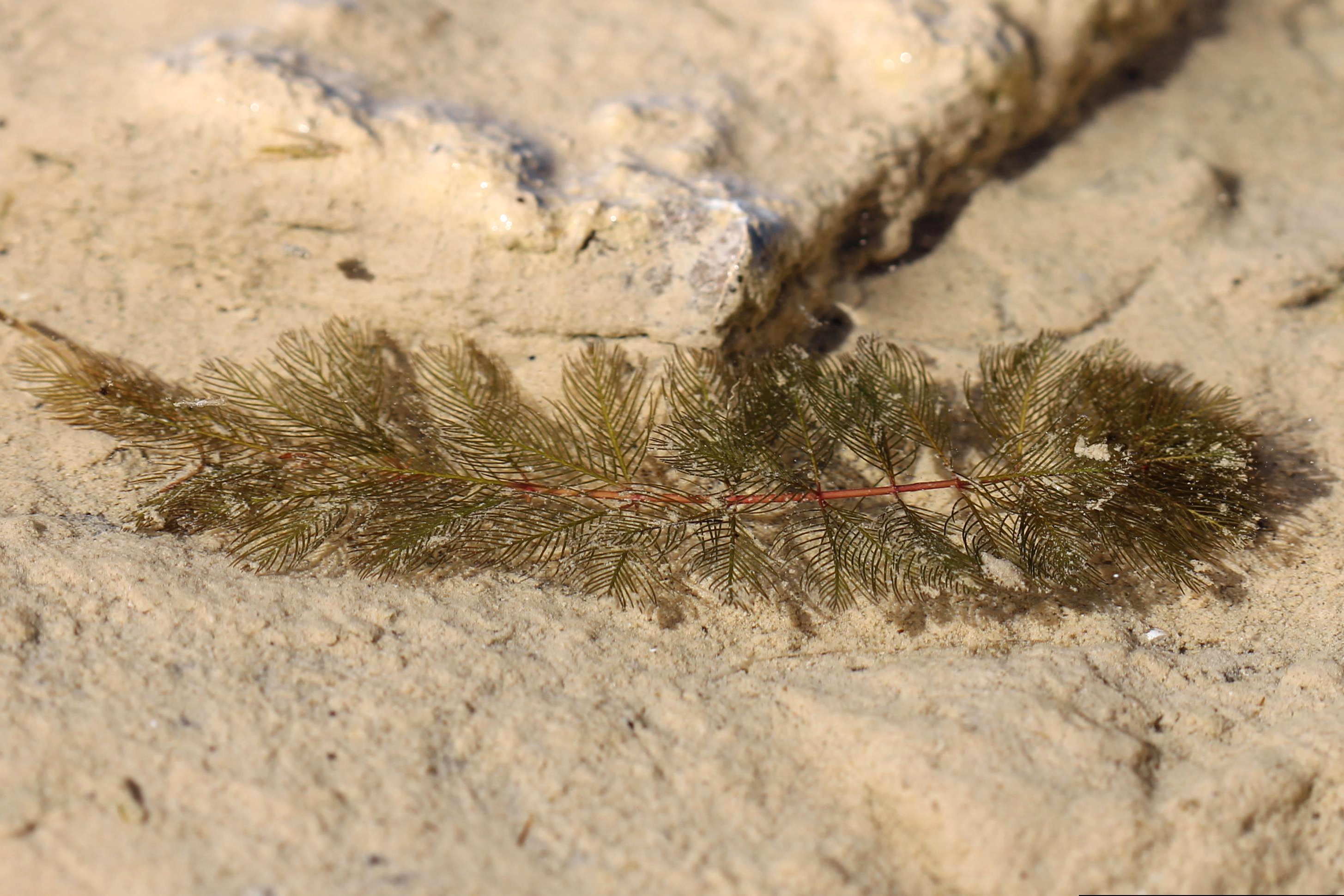
Invasive Eurasian Water-Milfoil weed

=== Invasive species ===
The following is a list of the most common invasive species in Lake Minocqua

- Eurasian Water-Milfoil (Myriophyllum spicatum)
- Curley Leaf Pondweed (Potamogeton crispus)
- Purple Loosestrife (Lythrum salicaria L)
- Yellow Iris (Iris pseudacorus)
- Banded Mystery Snail (Viviparus georgianus)
- Chinese Mystery Snail (Cipangopaludina chinensis)
- Rusty Crayfish (Faxonius rusticus)

== Environmental concerns ==
Urban development of the surrounding towns of Minocqua and Woodruff has led to an impact on both the hydrology and the nutrient input of Lake Minocqua. Studies have found, through sampling sediment cores from the bottom of the lake, that since the development of the surrounding around starting around 1890, there have been increased levels of sediment and phosphorus. Stormwater runoff, commercial development and stormwater runoff are a few of the main concerns of additional nutrient sources entering the lake.

Numerous surveys were taken, following appropriate Wisconsin Department of Natural Resources guidelines to compile a list of sites around Lake Minocqua that were considered critical habitats that warrant particular management protocols to maintain. The list consists of 15 sites considered to be critical habitats.

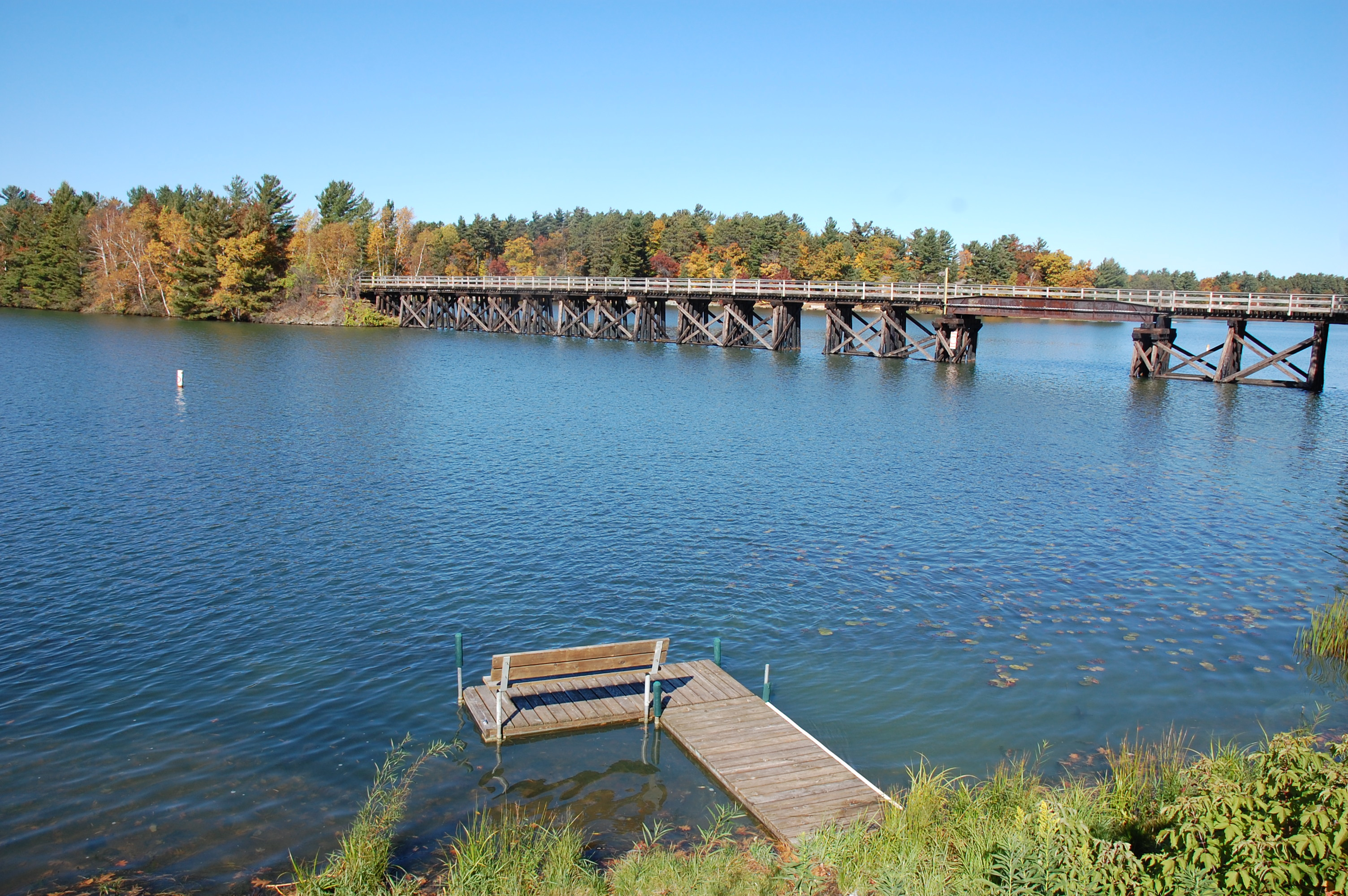

== Recreation ==
Lake Minocqua is part of the "Lakeland" area of Northern Wisconsin. Included in this group of lakes is Kawaguesaga Lake, and Tomahawk Lake. To the north is the Lac du Flambeau area, which has many small lakes, and to the east is the Eagle River area.

Lake Minocqua is home to many tourist attractions including year round fishing, water sports, designated swimming beaches, and waterfront restaurants. Due to its high volume of tourists, it is an important economic aspect for the area. Snowmobiling, fishing, boating, water-skiing, and swimming and other outdoor activities bring people in from all over the nation to the many resorts and summer homes on the lake.
