= Garrison Island =

Island in Wisconsin, United States

Coordinates: 44°22′31″N 89°50′42″W

Garrison Island is a river island in Wood County, Wisconsin. The island is on the Wisconsin River at the city of Wisconsin Rapids.

Garrison Island was named after Frank Garrison, a former owner of the site.
