= Strawberry Islands =

Group of islands in Lake Michigan

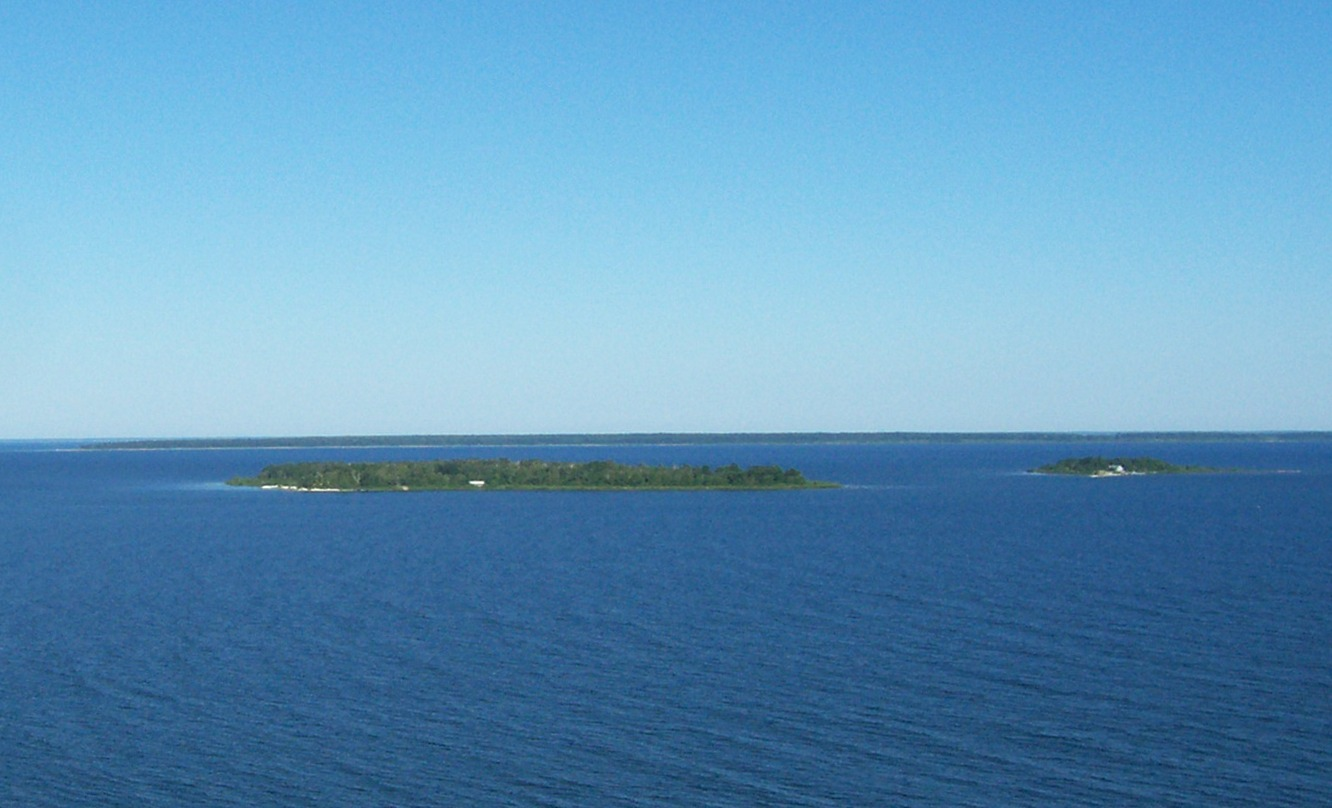
- Strawberry Islands from mainland

- Location within Wisconsin Location within the United States

Geography
- Location: Door County, Wisconsin
- Coordinates: 45°10′16″N 87°16′06″W
- Adjacent to: Lake Michigan
- Highest elevation: 581 ft (177.1 m)

Administration
- United States
- State: Wisconsin
- County: Door
- Town: Gibraltar

The Strawberry Islands are a small chain of four islands located on the Wisconsin side of Green Bay between Chambers Island and Peninsula State Park. The islands are part of the Town of Gibraltar, Wisconsin.

The islands were likely occupied for thousands of years by indigenous peoples. Gradually the historic Ojibwe people moved into the area around the Great Lakes, where they competed with the existing Sioux (Lakota). They pushed the Sioux west into the Great Plains, with their last battle occurring in 1745.

The islands and the adjacent Strawberry Channel were part of a border dispute between Wisconsin and Michigan that was eventually resolved in the 1926 United States Supreme Court case Michigan v. Wisconsin.

The northernmost island of the chain is Pirate Island, which at high water levels is little more than a reef awash. The next island to the south is Jack Island, and the next to the south is Little Strawberry Island. The largest island at the very southern tip of the chain is named Adventure Island. Today, all but Pirate Island are privately owned.

== Climate ==
Strawberry Islands

Climate chart (precipitation, max. and min. temperature)
J	F	M	A	M	J	J	A	S	O	N	D
63 −7 −13	52 −13 −18	49 0 −6	97 5 0	86 10 4	91 17 11	105 19 17	96 18 16	96 17 14	107 9 6	80 9 3	57 4 −1
- █ Average max. and min. temperatures in °C
- █ Precipitation totals in mm
Imperial conversion
J	F	M	A	M	J	J	A	S	O	N	D
2.5 19 9	2 9 0	1.9 32 21	3.8 41 32	3.4 50 39	3.6 63 52	4.1 66 63	3.8 64 61	3.8 63 57	4.2 48 43	3.1 48 37	2.2 39 30
- █ Average max. and min. temperatures in °F
- █ Precipitation totals in inches

== Gallery ==
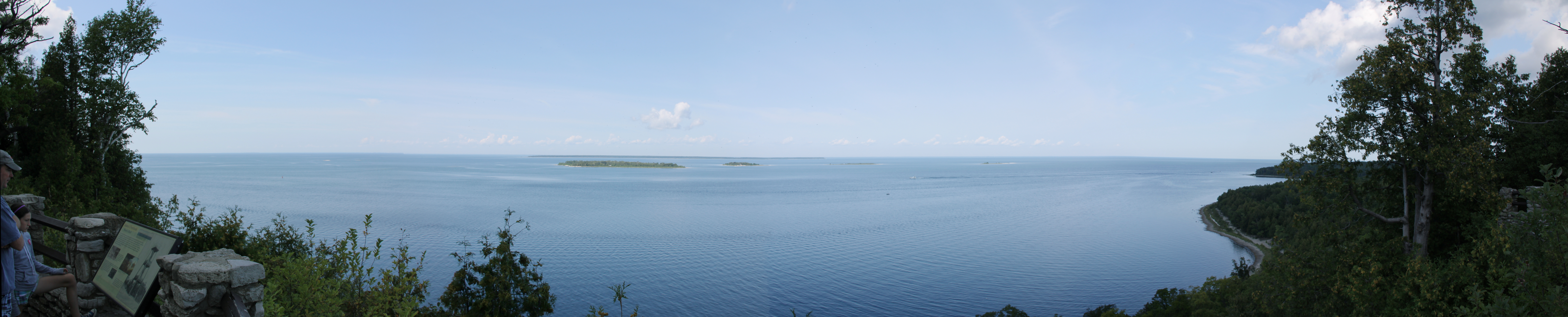
Stitched panorama showing all four Strawberry Islands

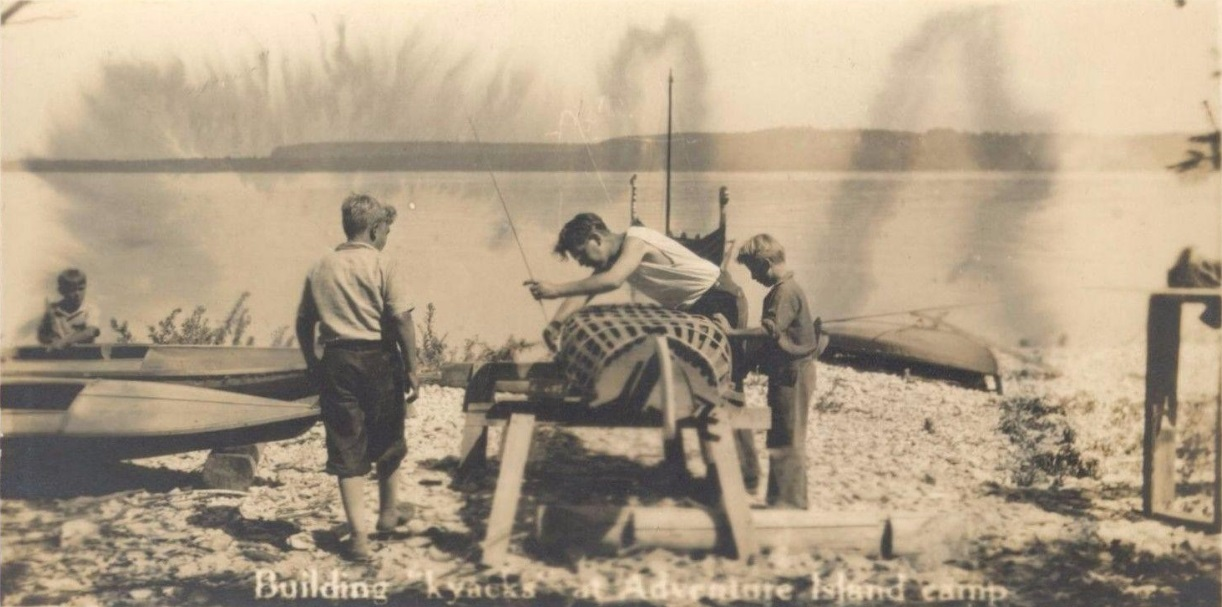
Boys building kayaks at Adventure Island Camp. Adventure Island is also known as Big Strawberry Island.

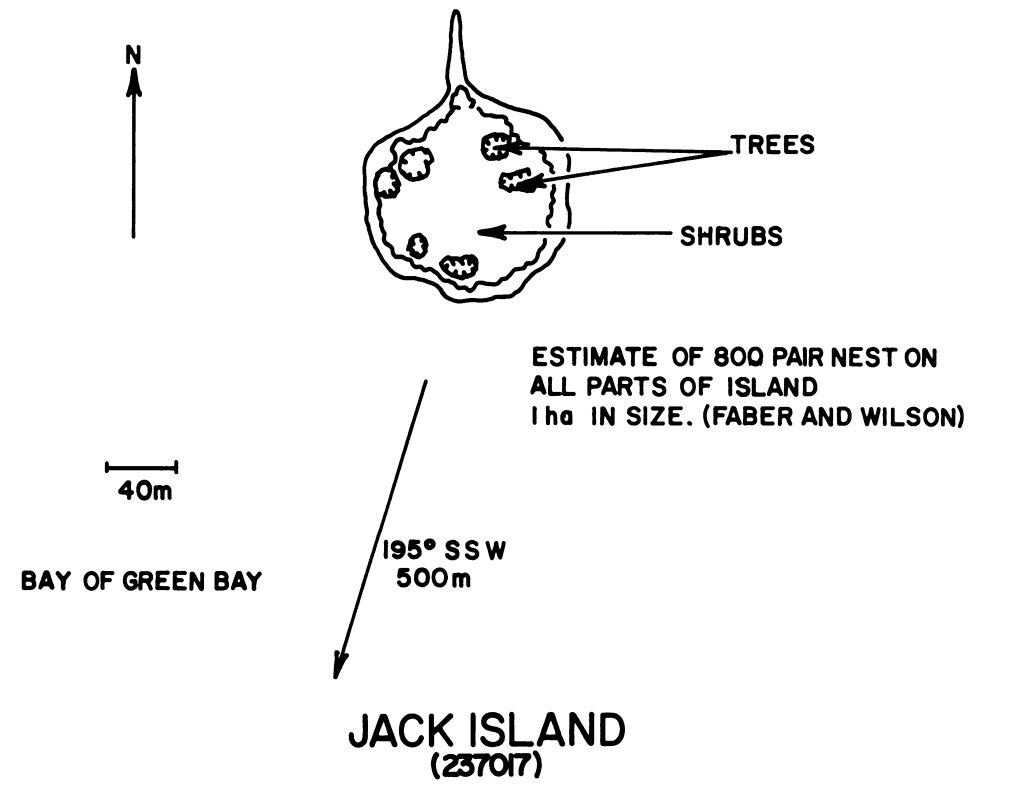
Jack Island, diagram drawn after a visit by airplane in 1976

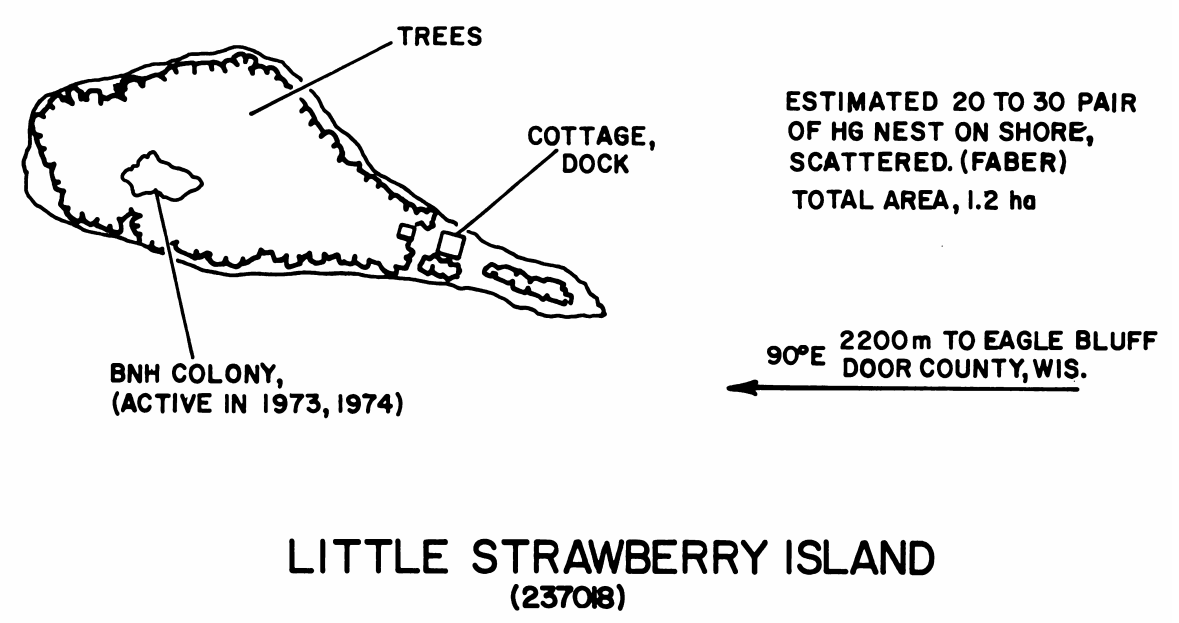
Little Strawberry Island, diagram drawn from observations made in 1975 or shortly before
