= Balsam Lake (Wisconsin) =

Lake in Wisconsin, United States

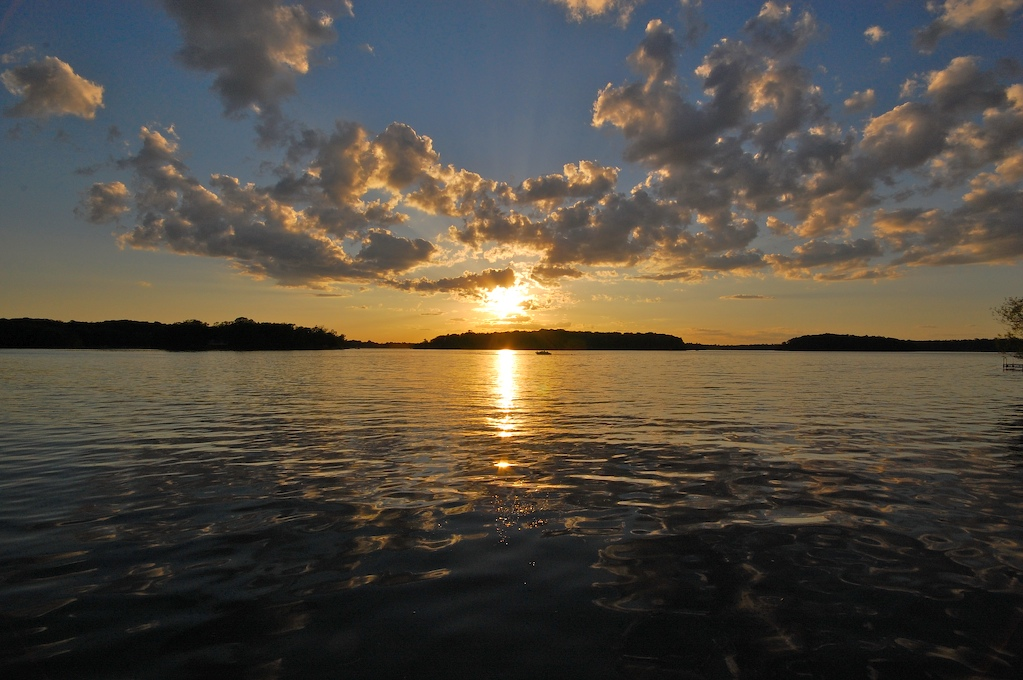
- Balsam Lake sunset.

- Location within Wisconsin Location within the United States
- Location: Polk County, Wisconsin, U.S.
- Coordinates: 45°27′54″N 92°26′13″W
- Basin countries: United States
- Surface area: 2,054 acres (8.31 km^{2})
- Max. depth: 37 ft (11 m)
- Shore length^{1}: 65 mi (105 km)
- ^{1} Shore length is not a well-defined measure.

Balsam Lake covers over 65 mi (105 km) of shoreline and covering a surface area of 2,054 acre (831 ha) and is the biggest lake in Polk County, Wisconsin. Public access to the lake by boat ramps are on the northwest, southwest and East Balsam. It is fed by natural springs and seepage from wetlands on the southwestern, northeastern and eastern shores. Maximum depth is 37 ft (11 m).

Balsam Lake is well known for its great fishing for panfish (bluegill, sunfish, crappie, yellow perch, and bullhead) and sport fish such as largemouth bass, walleye, and northern pike. Other recreational activities such as boating, canoeing, swimming and water-skiing in summer and ice fishing, snowmobiling, and cross-country skiing and the 17.8 mi (29 km) Cattail State Trail.

Over fifty businesses line the shore of the lake, including resorts, motels, bait and tackle shops, grocery stores, restaurants, insurance offices, chiropractic, hardware, gas stations, taverns and more

The original plat records the Ojibwe Indian name of this place as Innenehinduc. Translated as "Place of the Evergreen", the town and village of Balsam Lake were named after this large lake.

Balsam Branch, the main outlet of Balsam Lake is a Class II trout stream.
