= List of islands of the Midwestern United States =

This is a partial list of islands of the Midwestern United States.

== States ==
=== Illinois ===
- Bardwell Island
- Big Blue Island
- Campbell's Island
- Carroll Island
- Chouteau Island
- Dillon Island
- Goose Island
- Isle a la Cache
- Kaskaskia Island
- Long Island
- McEvers Island
- Mosenthein Island
- Rock Island Arsenal
- Stolp Island
- Treat Island
- Tully Island

=== Indiana ===
- Beeler
- Biddle
- Big (Fulton County)
- Big (Noble County)
- Bishop
- Bois
- Block
- Brown
- Greathouse
- Holmes
- Island Park
- Monkey
- Morrison
- Ribeyre
- Sevenmile

=== Iowa ===
- Beaver Island, Clinton County, Iowa
- Chaplain Schmitt Memorial Island, in the Mississippi River, in Dubuque, Iowa
- Credit Island, in the Mississippi River, in Davenport, Iowa
- Sabula, Iowa, the site of Iowa's only island city

=== Kansas ===
- Ackerman Island, former island in Wichita
- Franks Island
- Kickapoo Island - historical
- Nelson Island
- Stigers Island

=== Michigan ===
- Amygdaloid Island, part of Isle Royale National Park
- Beaver Island, inhabited island in Lake Michigan
- Beaver Island, small island in Lake Superior
- Belle Isle, city park in Detroit in the Detroit River
- Bois Blanc Island, inhabited island in Lake Huron
- Calf Island, part of Detroit River International Wildlife Refuge
- Charity Island, in Saginaw Bay, Lake Huron
- Cherry Island, Potagannissing Bay at the south end of the St. Marys River
- Copper Island, tip of Keweenaw Peninsula
- Crooked Island, Lake Huron
- Crow Island, in Saginaw River, site of Crow Island State Game Area
- Diamond Island, in Diamond Lake (Michigan)
- Drummond Island, inhabited island in Lake Huron
- Frying Pan Island, St. Marys River, had lighthouse
- Garden Island Lake Michigan
- Gard Island, Lake Erie, owned by University of Toledo
- Gull Island, any of a dozen small islands
- Grand Island, location of Grand Island National Recreation Area
- Granite Island, site of lighthouse in Lake Superior
- Grassy Island, part of Detroit River International Wildlife Refuge
- Grosse Ile, inhabited island in Detroit River
- Harbor Island National Wildlife Refuge
- Harsens Island, inhabited island in Lake St. Clair
- Hickory Island, southern end of Grosse Ile
- Higgins Island,
- High Island, Lake Michigan
- Hog Island, Lake Michigan
- Horse Island, Lake Erie, near Gibraltar
- Huron Islands, Lake Superior, has lighthouse
- Indian Island, Lake Erie
- Ile Aux Galets, Lake Michigan, location of Skillagalee Lighthouse
- Isle Royale, location of Isle Royale National Park in Lake Superior
- Katechay Island, in Saginaw Bay, Lake Huron
- Les Cheneaux Islands, group of 36 inhabited islands in Lake Huron
- Lime Island, in St. Marys River
- Little Charity Island, in Saginaw Bay, Lake Huron
- Little Summer Island, Lake Michigan
- Long Island (Michigan)
- Mackinac Island, inhabited island in Lake Huron
- Manitou Island, Lake Superior, site of lighthouse
- Marquette Island, Lake Huron, one of the Le Cheneaux group
- Michigan Islands National Wildlife Reserve
- Middle Island, Lake Huron
- Mud Island, part of Detroit River International Wildlife Refuge
- Naubinway Island, Lake Michigan, site of lighthouse
- Neebish Island, inhabited island in St. Marys River
- North Island, Saginaw Bay, Lake Huron
- North Cape, in Lake Erie
- North Fox Island, state-owned island in Lake Michigan
- North Manitou Island, part of Sleeping Bear Dunes National Lakeshore
- Ojibway Island, in Saginaw River
- Passage Island, Isle Royale National Park, has lighthouse
- Peach Isle, in Detroit River, site of Peach Isle Range Lighthouse
- Pipe Island, St. Marys River, had lighthouse
- Poverty Island, Lake Michigan
- Power Island, also called Ford Island and Marion Island, a Grand Traverse County park
- Round Island, Chippewa County, in Lake Superior, has lighthouse
- Round Island, Chippewa County, in St. Marys River, has lighthouse
- Round Island, Alpena County, in Lake Huron, site of lighthouse
- Round Island, Delta County, in Green Bay in Lake Michigan
- Round Island, Delta County, in Big Bay De Noc in Lake Michigan
- Round Island, Keweenaw County, off Isle Royale in Lake Superior
- Round Island, Mackinac County, off Mackinac Island in Lake Huron, has lighthouse
- Round Island, Presque Isle County, in Grand Lake
- Round Island, Wayne County, at southern tip of Grosse Ile in Lake Erie
- St. Helena Island, Lake Michigan, site of lighthouse
- St. Martin Island, Lake Michigan, has lighthouse
- South Island, Saginaw Bay, Lake Huron
- South Fox Island inhabited island in Lake Michigan
- South Manitou Island, part of Sleeping Bear Dunes National Lakeshore
- Stoney Point Island, Lake Erie
- Squaw Island, Lake Michigan
- Sugar Island, inhabited, includes part of Bay Mills Indian Reservation
- Summer Island, Lake Michigan
- Thunder Bay Island, Lake Huron, site of lighthouse
- Trout Island, Lake Michigan
- Turtle Island, Lake Erie
- Whiskey Island, Lake Michigan
- Washington Island, part of Isle Royale National Park
- Waugoshance Island, Lake Michigan
- Zug Island, part of Ford Motor Company's River Rouge Plant

=== Minnesota ===
- Aeroplane Island
- Aikio Island
- Alepo Island
- Anderson Island
- Angel Island
- Babe Island (Minnesota)
- Baileys Island
- Bakers Island
- Baldwin Island
- Banfill Island (?)
- Banfills Island (?)
- Barrett Island
- Bear Island
- Big Island, Lake Minnetonka
- Boom Island - historical
- Campers Island (Minnesota)
- Coney Island, Lake Waconia
- Crane Island
- Deering Island, Lake Minnetonka
- Eagle Island, Lake Minnetonka
- Enchanted Island, Lake Minnetonka
- Goose Island, Lake Minnetonka
- Gale's Island, Lake Minnetonka
- Grey Cloud Island
- Harriet Island - historical
- Hennepin Island - historical
- Latsch Island
- Manitou Island
- Nicollet Island
- Oak Island
- Pike Island
- Peacebunny Island, Mississippi River
- Raspberry Island, Mississippi River
- Ripple Island (Minnesota), an island in Shagawa Lake
- Shady Island, Lake Minnetonka
- Spirit Island, Lake Minnetonka
- Spray Island, Lake Minnetonka
- Star Island, the island containing Lake Windigo
- Wawatasso Island, Lake Minnetonka (Boy Scout)

=== Missouri ===
==== Missouri River Islands ====
- Bonhomme Island
- Catfish Island
- Deroin Bend Island
- Howell Island
- Johnson Island
- Lower Hamburg Island
- Pelican Island
- Rush Bottoms Island
- Worthwine Island

==== Mississippi River Islands ====
- Angle Island
- Apple Island
- Bolter Island
- Cuivre Island
- Dardenne Island
- Dresser Island
- Ellis Island
- Gilbert Island
- Grand Tower Island
- Maple Island
- Mason Island
- Moser Island
- Peruque Island
- Pharrs Island
- Portage Island
- Tower Rock
- Two Branch Island
- Westport Island

==== Osage River Islands ====
- Bell Island
- Cotton Island
- Hawaiian Island

=== Nebraska ===
- Goat Island (On the Missouri River, between Vermillion, SD, and Yankton, SD.)

=== North Dakota ===
- Grahams Island
- Gros Ventres Island (historical)

=== Ohio ===
- Ballast Island
- Bass Islands
  - Middle Bass Island
    - Sugar Island (lies northwest of Middle Bass Island)
  - North Bass Island
  - South Bass Island
- Buckeye Island
- Gibraltar Island
- Green Island
- Gull Island (former)
- Johnson's Island
- Kafralu Island
- Kelleys Island
- Lost Ballast Island
- Mouse Island
- Rattlesnake Island
- Starve Island
- Turtle Island
- West Sister Island

=== South Dakota ===
- Goat Island (part)

=== Wisconsin ===
- Apostle Islands
  - Basswood Island
  - Bear Island
  - Devils Island
  - Cat Island
  - Eagle Island
  - Gull Island
  - Hermit Island
  - Ironwood Island
  - Long Island
  - Madeline Island, contains the Town of La Pointe (population 250)
  - Manitou Island
  - Michigan Island
  - North Twin Island
  - Oak Island
  - Otter Island
  - Outer Island
  - Raspberry Island
  - Rocky Island
  - Sand Island
  - South Twin Island
  - Stockton Island
  - York Island
- Adventure Island
- The Ansul Islands
- Baker's Island
- Barker's Island
- Bergmann Island
- Brunet Island (part of a State Park)
- Cana Island
- Chambers Island
- Detroit Island
- Doty Island
- Duck Island
- Fish Island
- French Island, contains the Town of Campbell (population 4,410)
- Gravel Island
- Green Island
- Hat Island
- Hog Island
- Horseshoe Island
- Jones Island, Milwaukee
- Leslie Island
- Pilot Island
- Plum Island
- Rock Island
- The Sister Islands
- Spider Island
- The Strawberry Islands
- Sugar Island
- Washington Island, contains the Town of Washington (population 660)
- Willow Island (Wisconsin)

== See also ==
- Islands of the Great Lakes
- List of islands of the United States
