= Pilot Island Light =

Lighthouse in Wisconsin, United States

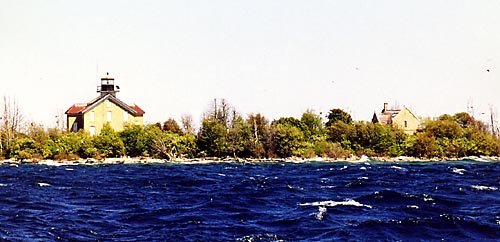
- Location: Gills Rock, Wisconsin
- Coordinates: 45°17′3.067″N 86°55′11.012″W

Tower
- Constructed: 1858
- Foundation: Concrete
- Construction: Milwaukee Cream City brick
- Automated: 1962
- Height: 41 feet (12 m)
- Shape: Square
- Markings: yellow, black lantern and parapet
- Heritage: National Register of Historic Places listed place

Light
- First lit: 1858
- Focal height: 48 feet (15 m)
- Lens: Fourth order Fresnel lens
- Range: 12 nautical miles (22 km; 14 mi)
- Characteristic: White, Flashing (2), 6 sec
- Pilot Island Light
- U.S. National Register of Historic Places
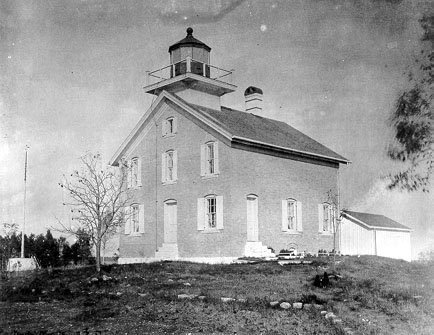
- USCG archive photo
- Nearest city: Gills Rock, Wisconsin
- Area: 3.5 acres (1.4 ha)
- NRHP reference No.: 83004279
- Added to NRHP: November 21, 1983

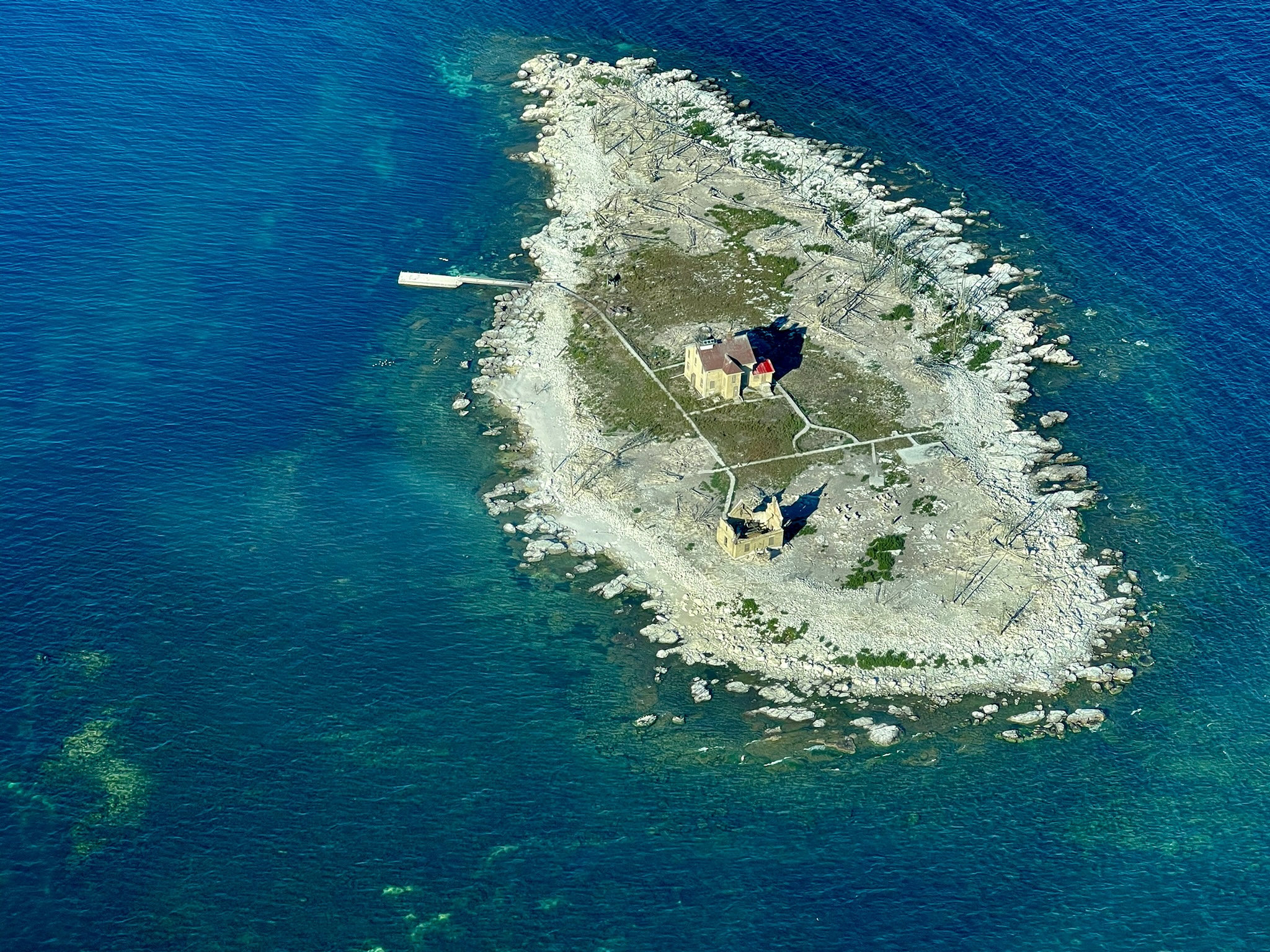

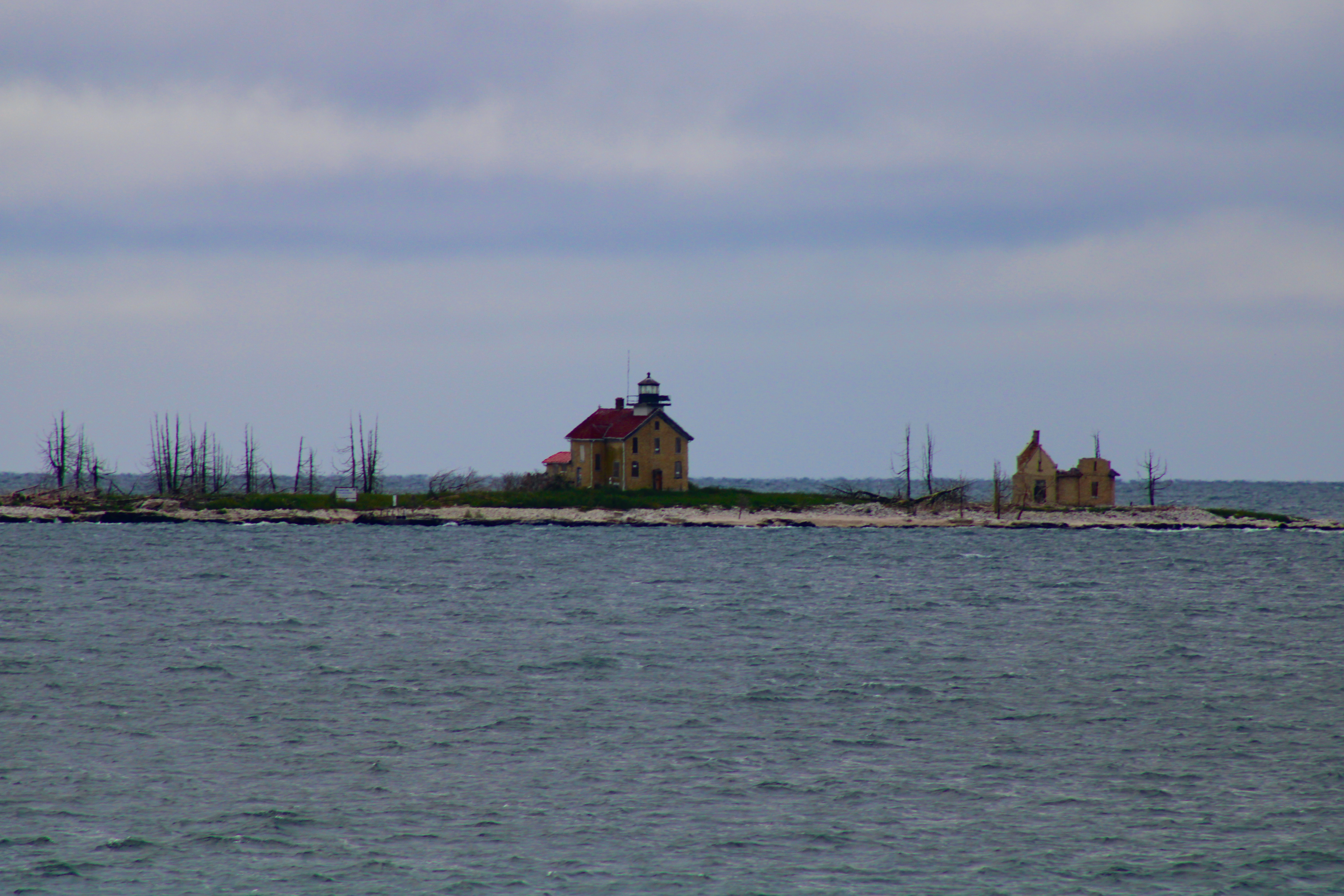
The Pilot Island Light is a lighthouse located near Gills Rock, on Pilot Island at the east end of Death's Door passage, in Door County, Wisconsin.

The building's design is similar to Pottawatomie Light on Rock Island (and many others), but is made of brick instead of stone. Until 1910 it was called Port des Morts Island Light. The light was converted to electric in 1942 and automated in 1962.

== History ==
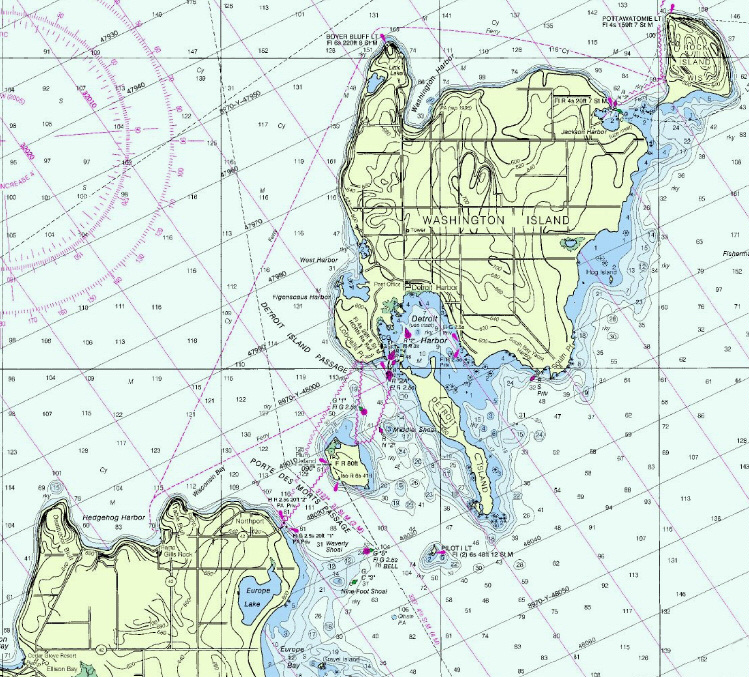
Detail of NOAA Chart #14909

The original Port des Morts Light was built on nearby Plum Island in 1849, but was closed and rebuilt on Pilot Island in 1858 to better mark the channel.

Frequent and oppressive fog made the passage hazardous, as well as making it an extremely lonely and forbidding place to work. A fog bell signal was installed in 1862. In 1864 it was replaced by a foghorn. In 1875 it was converted to a steam powered fog siren. In 1880 a separate fog building was built for a "duplicate" fog siren. This began a 10-inch (250 mm) steam whistle and new building in 1900 (which still exists near water's edge). In 1904, there came a realization that the whistles were "less than effective" and they were replaced by dual diaphones. The horns made living there difficult; fertilized eggs would be destroyed by the sounds.

Due to the workload associated with the light and fog signal, the station was staffed by a keeper and two assistant keepers. This led to the conversion of an old fog signal building into housing for the second assistant keeper in 1901.

It is one of ten lighthouses in Door County. It was listed in the National Register of Historic Places in 1972 as the Pilot Island Light, reference #83004279.

The island is controlled by the United States Fish and Wildlife Service as part of the Green Bay National Wildlife Refuge since 2007. The grounds, dwelling and tower are closed to public use. The island is currently "abandoned, overgrown, and overrun" by a large cormorant population.

== Pilot Island NW Site Shipwrecks ==
On October 17, 1892, the schooner JE Gilmore wrecked on the reef northwest of the island, very near to where the Forest had wrecked the year before. The crew remained aboard until a storm arrived on October 28, then abandoned ship. As the storm grew, the AP Nichols attempted to make the passage and was also driven onto the reef to join the Forest and JE Gilmore. Keeper Martin Knudsen ventured out onto the reef in the middle of the storm and was able to rescue the crew of six. For this, he was awarded a silver lifesaving medal from the US government and the Life Saving Benevolent Association of New York's gold medal. Partly as a result of this, a US Lifesaving station was built on neighboring Plum Island in 1895.

== See also ==
Pilot Island NW Site

Green Bay National Wildlife Refuge
