= Otter Rock =

Otter Rock may refer to:

- Otter Rock (Antarctica), a rock formation off the coast of Trinity Peninsula
- Otter Rock, Oregon, an unincorporated community in Lincoln County, Oregon, United States
- "Otter Rock", a song by the Chemical Brothers, appearing on the album Singles 93–03

== See also ==
- Otter Island (disambiguation)
