= Devils Island Light =

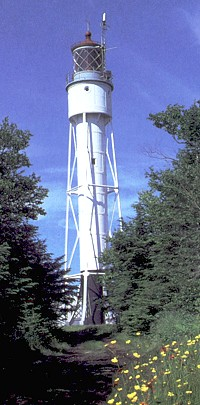
- Location: Devils Island, Wisconsin
- Coordinates: 47°04′46.288″N 90°43′41.13″W

Tower
- Foundation: Concrete
- Construction: Cast iron
- Automated: 1978; 48 years ago
- Height: 71 feet (22 m)
- Shape: Cylindrical Free Standing
- Heritage: National Register of Historic Places contributing property

Light
- First lit: 1901; 125 years ago
- Focal height: 100 feet (30 m)
- Lens: 3rd order Fresnel lens
- Range: 9 nautical miles (17 km; 10 mi)
- Characteristic: Red, Flashing, 10 sec
- Devils Island Light
- U.S. Historic district – Contributing property
- Area: 33.8 acres (13.7 ha)
- Built: 1857; 169 years ago
- Built by: United States Lighthouse Service
- Part of: Apostle Islands Lighthouses (ID77000145)
- Designated CP: March 8, 1977

The Devils Island Lighthouse is a lighthouse located on Devils Island, one of the Apostle Islands, in Lake Superior in Ashland County, Wisconsin, near the city of Bayfield. Among the Apostle Islands lighthouses—a testament to its remoteness—it was the last built, and the last automated and unmanned.

== History ==
Owned by the National Park Service and part of the Apostle Islands National Lakeshore, it is a contributing property to the Apostle Islands Lighthouses and was added to the National Register of Historic Places in 1977.. It is also listed in the Library of Congress Historic American Buildings Survey, WI-324. Several other structures in the vicinity are also listed in HABS.

The "Devils Island Light Station Cultural Landscape" was included as one of five lighthouses (with state-level significance) (Note: Built between 1852 and 1929.) in the National Register of Historic Places nomination on March 8, 1977. It occupies approximately 16 acres (6.5 ha) on the north lakeshore of the 318 acres (129 ha) Devils Island. Within are several structures. A previous skeletal, wooden structure was constructed in 1891 has since been demolished. Historical brick Queen Anne style keepers quarters (1896) are collocated with the current lighthouse. Also on the premises were two oil houses, a tramway, a brownstone tramway engine building, a dock, wooden boathouse (1 mile distant) and a radio beacon/tower. An inclined Tramway (1893) and Engine Building (1901) provided transport of equipment, gear and supplies.

The original third order Fresnel lens manufactured by Henry-Lepaute was removed by the U.S. Coast Guard in 1989, but a new third order Fresnel lens was replaced by the N.P.S. in 1992.

The site originally had a 10-inch (250 mm) steam whistle in a fog signal building. That was removed in 1925, and "a much improved air-operated diaphone fog signal" was accomplished. In 1928, a diesel-powered electrical generator was installed, and the light intensity increased to 300,000 candela for the white flash and 180,000 candela for the red.

In 1928, U.S. President Calvin Coolidge and the first lady visited the island and lighthouse during an 88-day vacation to Wisconsin.

== Getting there ==
Most of the Apostle Islands Lighthouses may be reached on the Apostle Islands Cruise Service water taxi or by private boat during the summer. During the Annual Apostle Island Lighthouse Celebration ferry tour service is available for all the lighthouses. In the tourist season, volunteer park rangers are on many of the islands to greet visitors.

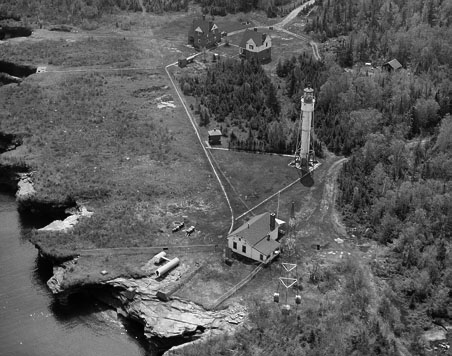
USCG archive photo

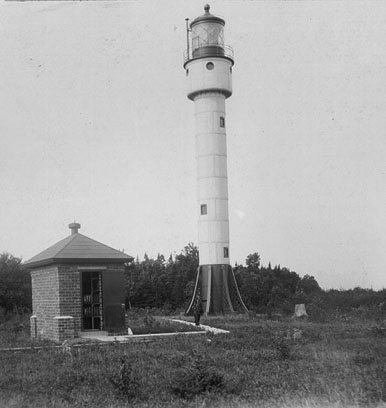
USCG archive photo

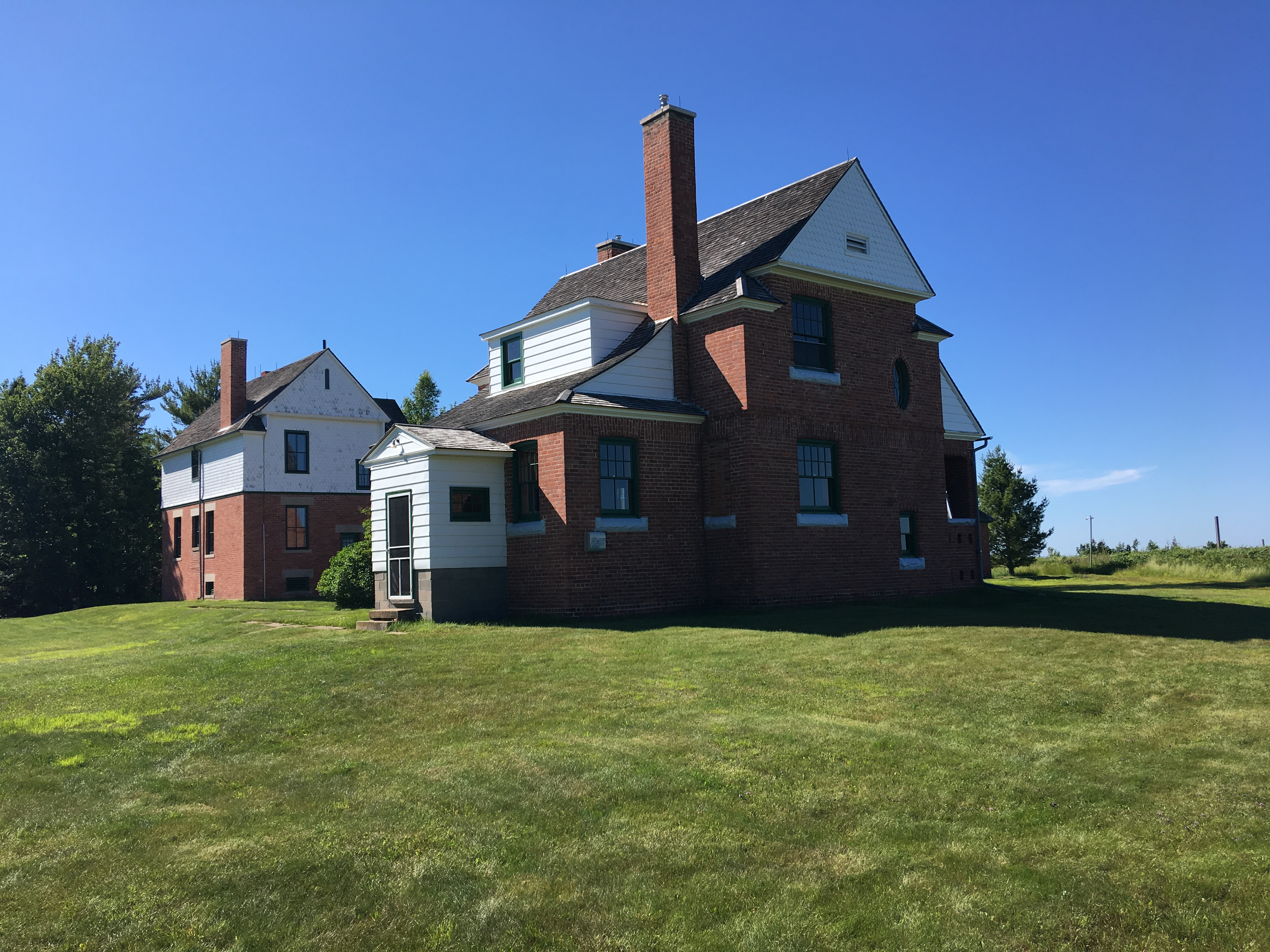
Devil's Island Light keeper's quarters viewed from the southeast. The lighthouse is obscured from this angle.

== See also ==
- Wisconsin lighthouses
