= Otter Island =

Otter Island may refer to:

- Otter Island (Alaska), island near Saint Paul Island, Alaska
- Otter Island (Ontario), island in Ontario, Canada
- Otter Island (South Carolina), noted in American Civil War accounts
- Otter Island (Wisconsin), island located in Wisconsin
- Otter Island (Tangier Sound), island in Maryland
- Otter Island (Scotland), island in Scotland
- Otter Island, an island on Derwentwater in Cumbria, England
