= Ribeyre Island =

Island in Posey County, Indiana, United States

- Location within Indiana

Geography
- Location: Wabash River
- Coordinates: 38°6′23″N 87°58′7″W
- Highest elevation: 364 ft (110.9 m)

Administration
- United States
- State: Indiana
- County: Posey
- Township: Harmony Township

Demographics
- Population: 0 (2000)

Ribeyre Island is located on the Wabash River in Harmony Township, Posey County, Indiana, southwest of the town of New Harmony. The island is accessible only from the Illinois side. The island is trapped between an old meander of the Wabash, which forms the state boundary between Indiana and Illinois and the main river channel. The island is covered with farm fields, and possibly a single residence. Numerous sloughs mark the southern end of the island.

== See also ==
- Islands of the Midwest
