= Holmes Island (Indiana) =

Island in LaPorte County, Indiana, US

- Location within Indiana

Geography
- Location: Wabash River
- Coordinates: 41°37′39″N 86°44′58″W
- Highest elevation: 804 ft (245.1 m)

Administration
- United States
- State: Indiana
- County: LaPorte
- Township: Center Township

Demographics
- Population: ~ 200 (permanent)

Holmes Island is located in Pine Lake, in Center Township, LaPorte County, just northwest of LaPorte, Indiana. The island is a residential community.

== See also ==
- Islands of the Midwest
