= Biddle Island (Indiana) =

Island in the Wabash River, Indiana

- Location within Indiana

Geography
- Location: Wabash River
- Coordinates: 40°44′59″N 86°21′53″W
- Highest elevation: 591 ft (180.1 m)

Administration
- United States
- State: Indiana
- County: Cass
- City: Logansport

Demographics
- Population: 0 (2000)

Biddle Island is located in the Wabash River, in downtown Logansport, Indiana, just east of the merger of the Eel River and the Wabash. State Route 329 (Burlington Avenue) crosses the island to south bank of the Wabash. There are about twenty private residents on the island, which is about 17 acres. The island was named for its former owner Horace P. Biddle, a local judge and poet. Biddle's home on the island was a large house built by John Tipton. The house was razed in 1961.

== See also ==
- Islands of the Midwest
