= Apostle Islands National Lakeshore =

69,372 acres in Wisconsin (US) managed by the National Park Service

- IUCN category V (protected landscape/seascape)
- Devils Island shoreline

- Location within Wisconsin Location within the United States
- Interactive map of Apostle Islands National Lakeshore
- Location: Ashland and Bayfield counties, Wisconsin, U.S.
- Nearest city: Bayfield, Wisconsin, U.S.
- Coordinates: 46°57′55″N 90°39′51″W
- Area: 69,540 acres (281.4 km^{2})
- Established: September 26, 1970
- Visitors: 253,703 (in 2024)
- Governing body: National Park Service
- Website: Apostle Islands National Lakeshore

The Apostle Islands National Lakeshore is a U.S. national lakeshore consisting of 21 islands (the Apostle Islands) and shoreline encompassing 69,540 acres (28,140 ha) in northern Wisconsin, on the shore of Lake Superior. It is known for its collection of historic lighthouses, sandstone sea caves, a few old-growth remnant forests, and natural animal habitats. Of its area, 42,308 acres (17,121 ha) is land and 27,232 acres (11,020 ha) is water, extending one-quarter mile from the 155 miles (249 km) of shoreline.

The national lakeshore is managed by the National Park Service and headquartered in Bayfield, Wisconsin, on Lake Superior. Madeline Island, with commercial establishments of the town of La Pointe, is the only one of the Apostle Islands not included in the national lakeshore, although a portion of the island is protected as Big Bay State Park. Apostle Islands National Lakeshore is featured on the America the Beautiful quarters series.

== Islands ==
Beginning in the west, going north around the outer islands, then west, then east, ending with the southernmost island, the Apostle Islands included in the national lakeshore are:

- Eagle Island
- Sand Island – dock, ranger station, camping and lighthouse
- York Island – camping
- Bear Island
- Devils Island – dock, lighthouse, and camping
- Rocky Island – dock, ranger station, and camping
- South Twin Island – dock and camping
- North Twin Island
- Outer Island – dock, lighthouse, and camping
- Cat Island – camping
- Ironwood Island – camping
- Otter Island – dock and camping
- Raspberry Island – dock, ranger station, and lighthouse
- Oak Island – dock, ranger station, and camping
- Manitou Island – dock, ranger station, Manitou fish camp, and camping
- Stockton Island – two docks, ranger station, and camping. Sites include Trout Point Logging Camp and a sandstone quarry
- Gull Island
- Michigan Island – dock, lighthouse, and camping
- Hermit Island – includes a sandstone quarry
- Basswood Island – dock, camping, and the McCloud-Brigham Farm
- Long Island – modern lighthouse on the point

Historical evidence suggests that another island formerly existed alongside Eagle Island. It was known as Steamboat Island, although this name was apparently also used for Eagle Island itself, in which case Steamboat Island was called "Little Steamboat Island". Multiple sources dating from August 1901 document the disappearance of the island around that time, due to unknown natural forces.

== History ==
The Apostle Islands are a result of the glaciers that once covered North America. "Geologically they are originally part of the main land at the edge of the great rift or fault which formed the depression to which the waters of Lake Superior collected." When the glaciers melted, waves from the waters of Lake Superior caused erosion that formed the islands. The islands are composed of mostly red sandstone because of the glacial shift.

It is widely assumed that Native Americans were the first to inhabit the island. "There is some evidence that they were seen and possibly visited sometime in the fourteenth century by Indians who were making their way to Isle Royale near the north shore of the land in search of copper." In the 17th century, the islands were visited by Étienne Brûlé, a French explorer who, like many French Canadians, was trying to discover a new way to the East Indies. "Historians believe that the Jesuits named the islands the Apostle Islands according to their practice of giving holy names to new places." It is said that fur traders were the first explorers to settle in the area, building a village from the money they brought in.

Previously used for logging, farming, and mining during the early 20th century, the islands are returning to a primitive state; evidence of human habitation is still present, albeit mostly obscured by the regenerating forests. The islands' coastlines possess varied geology, where precambrian sandstone has eroded into sea caves, and the resulting sand has formed sandspits, cuspate forelands, tombolos, barrier spits, and beaches.

United States Senator Gaylord Nelson sponsored the federal legislation that established the Apostle Islands National Lakeshore. Public Law 91-424 was signed by President Richard M. Nixon on September 26, 1970. It included 20 islands, a 12-mile (19 km) strip of the mainland, and approximately 1/4 mile of Lake Superior jurisdiction adjacent to each land unit.

Public Law 99-497 in 1986 added Long Island to the National Lakeshore and transferred ownership of all the light stations from the U.S. Coast Guard to the National Park Service.

After the National Park Service completed a wilderness study in 2004 and received overwhelming support from the public, Congress designated 80 percent of the land area (35,000 acres (142 km^{2})) of the national lakeshore as the Gaylord Nelson Wilderness on December 8, 2004. (Public Law 108-447, Division E, Section 140.) Of the twenty-two Apostle Islands, the wilderness area fully or partially covers eighteen and preserves the prohibition of motorized travel on the wilderness islands. It is the largest wilderness area in Wisconsin. It is named for Gaylord Nelson, a U.S. Senator and governor of Wisconsin, who was instrumental in establishing the National Trails System, the Wilderness Act, and Earth Day.

The National Park Travelers Club held its 2012 convention at the Apostle Islands.

In 2024, legislation was introduced to rename the national lakeshore as a national park, with Sand Island as a national preserve.

== Flora and fauna ==
There are over 800 plant species on the islands and lakeshore. Ecologically, the islands contain some old growth, but primarily secondary Northern hardwood forest. There are elements of the oak, hickory, and hemlock hardwood forests of the eastern United States, but also features of the Boreal forest typical of Ontario. Larger wildlife on the islands and surrounding area include whitetail deer, black bear, red fox, and coyote. Smaller mammals such as squirrels, beaver, otter, snowshoe hare, and voles are also present. Avian species in the wilderness include waterfowl, ruffed grouse, and woodcock.

== Recreation ==
Many of the islands offer public docking; a small fee is charged for overnight use. The shoreline contains some historical sites, such as the many lighthouses throughout the islands. Fishing on Lake Superior is a popular activity for both boaters and non-boaters. The lake holds several species of trout and some species of salmon. In seasons when the water is warmer visitors can catch fish from the shore in water as shallow as ten feet.

Camping options range from more civilized sites that offer many amenities, such as well water, vault toilets, and food lockers, to sites that are more remote, further from other campers and offer nothing more than a tent pad or fire ring. Camping is offered on 18 of the 21 islands in the national lakeshore. Permits are required from the National Park Service in advance; reservations for group sites begin most years in January and for individual sites 30 days in advance.

Hunting is permitted on some islands for certain periods of the year. Game include white-tail deer, black bear, grouse, and other small game. As white-tailed deer have become abundant in recent years, deer hunting opportunities have been plentiful, although the logistics of hunting on the islands can be difficult. Hunting black bears is limited to two islands, and there are rules and regulations that apply only to specific areas.

To get from island to island many visitors choose to kayak, either bringing their own kayaks and equipment or renting from a local shop. The islands also offer opportunities to scuba divers to view interesting rock formations and shipwrecks. Scuba diving within a quarter-mile of any island shore requires obtaining a free permit from the park's visitor center.

== Lighthouses ==
Apostle Islands National Lakeshore has more lighthouses than any other National Park Service area (eight historic towers on six islands). For most of the century, the six Apostle Islands Lighthouses have guided ships and boats through the rough waters of Lake Superior and through the Apostle Islands.

The Sand Island lighthouse is one of the most popular lighthouses to visit on the islands. This lighthouse is approximately 44 feet (13 m) tall and was one of the first lighthouses to be automated in 1922. Boats tour this island June through late August every year on trips provided by volunteers of the National Park Service. The lighthouse on Raspberry Island has been completely renovated and is one of the most scenic in the Apostle Islands. Other lighthouses in the Apostle islands include both Old and New Michigan Island Lights, New La Pointe Light and Chequamegon Point Light on Long Island, Devils Island Light, and Outer Island Light. The ruins of Old LaPointe Light can still be seen on Long Island, approximately 0.5 miles (0.80 km) away from the wreckage of the schooner Lucerne.

== Local communities ==
Bayfield, Wisconsin, home of the national lakeshore's headquarters and visitor center, becomes more popular during the summer, when visitors travel to and from the islands. Other nearby communities are Red Cliff, three miles north of Bayfield, which offers a campground, marina, and the Legendary Waters Resort and Casino, and Washburn, located 10 miles (16 km) from Bayfield.

Climate data for Bayfield, Wisconsin
Month	Jan	Feb	Mar	Apr	May	Jun	Jul	Aug	Sep	Oct	Nov	Dec	Year
Mean daily maximum °F	20.7	25.5	36.7	50.1	63.2	72.4	78.4	75.5	65.8	55.2	39.2	25.2	50.7
Mean daily minimum °F	1.7	3.8	16.3	29.1	39	47.8	55.5	54.1	46	36.1	23.7	9.5	30.2
Average rainfall inches	1.6	0.9	2.2	2.1	3.3	3.5	3.5	4.2	4.1	2.9	2.3	1.8	32.3
Average snowfall inches	23.5	10.4	13.1	4.3	0.3	0.0	0.0	0.0	0.0	0.5	11.4	25.5	83.9
Mean daily maximum °C	−6.3	−3.6	2.6	10.1	17.3	22.4	25.8	24.2	18.8	12.9	4.0	−3.8	10.4
Mean daily minimum °C	−16.8	−15.7	−8.7	−1.6	4	8.8	13.1	12.3	8	2.3	−4.6	−12.5	−1.0
Average rainfall mm	41	23	56	53	84	89	89	110	100	74	58	46	820
Average snowfall cm	60	26	33	11	0.76	0.0	0.0	0.0	0.0	1.3	29	65	213

== Gallery ==
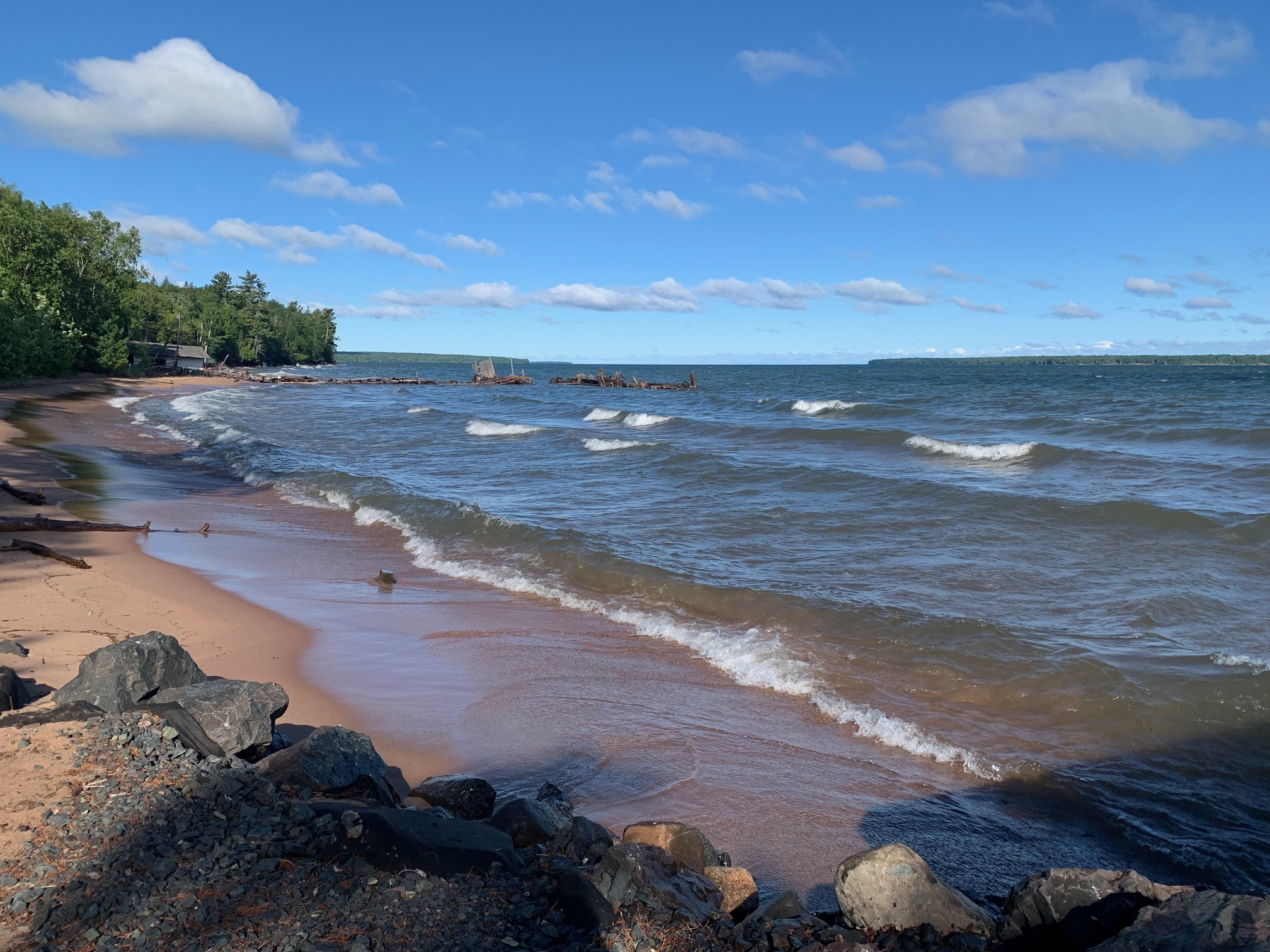
Beach at Little Sand Bay

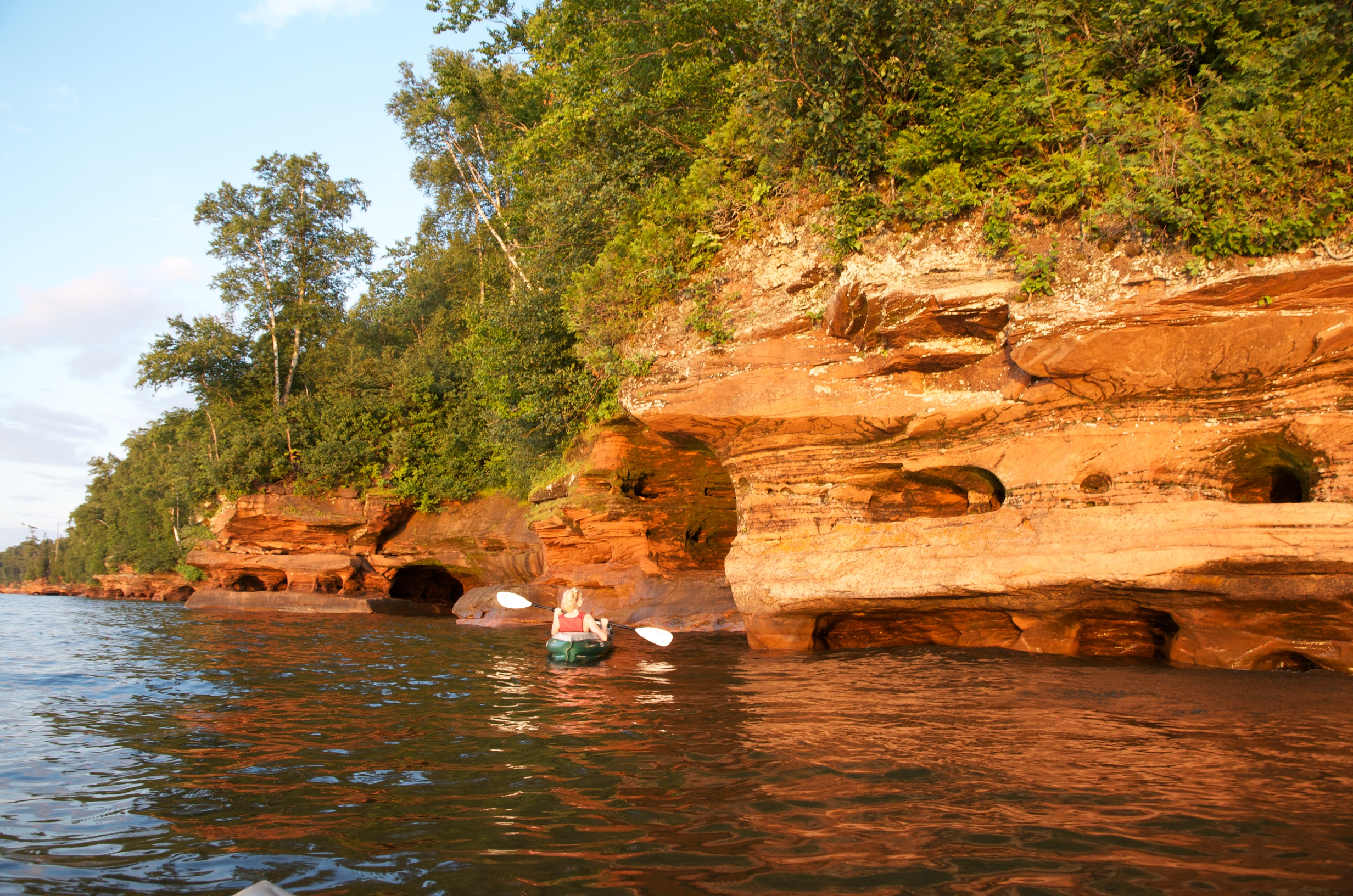
Sea kayaking along the national lakeshore

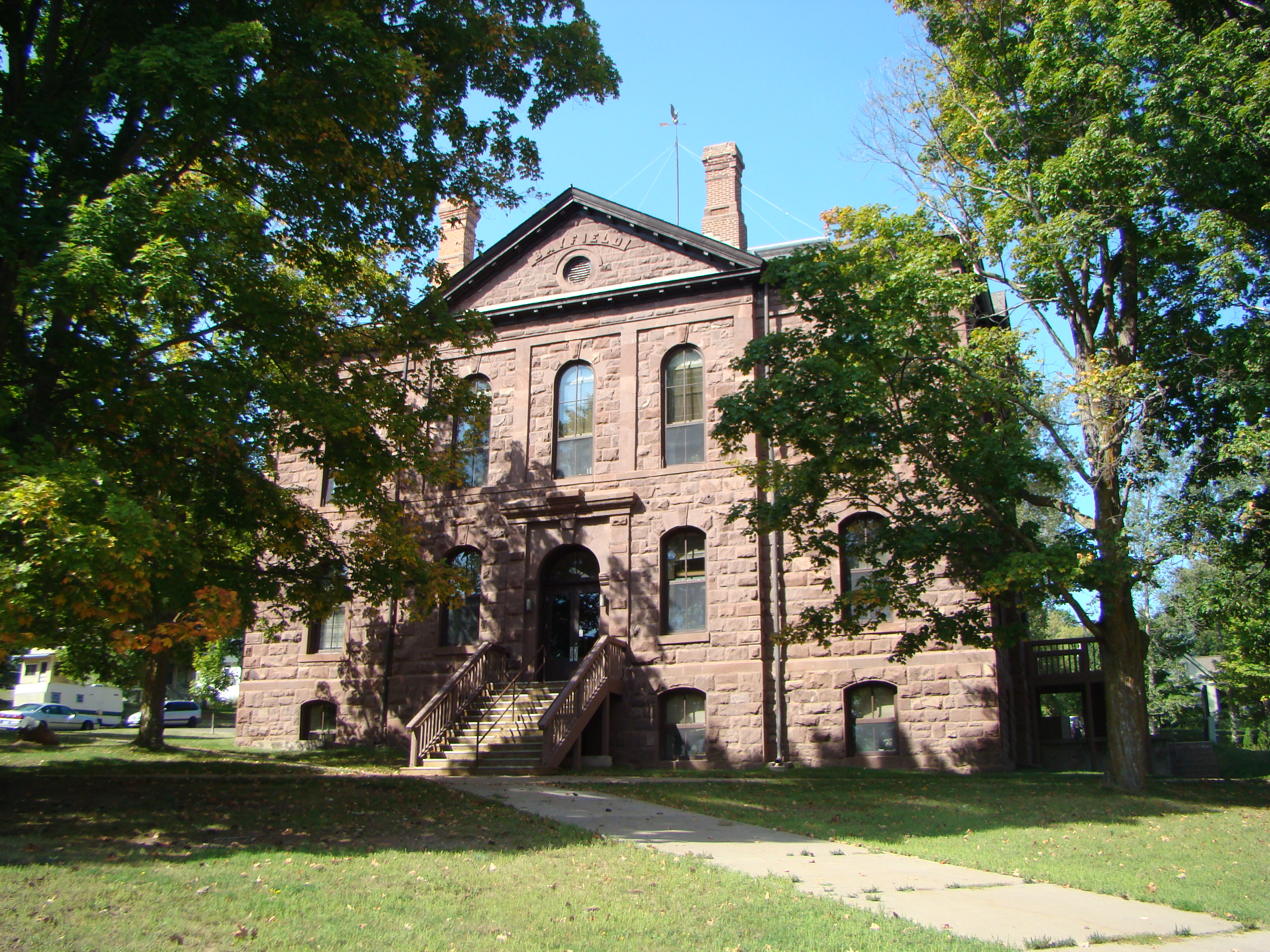
The park's headquarters in Bayfield is made of stone quarried from the islands before they became a national lakeshore.

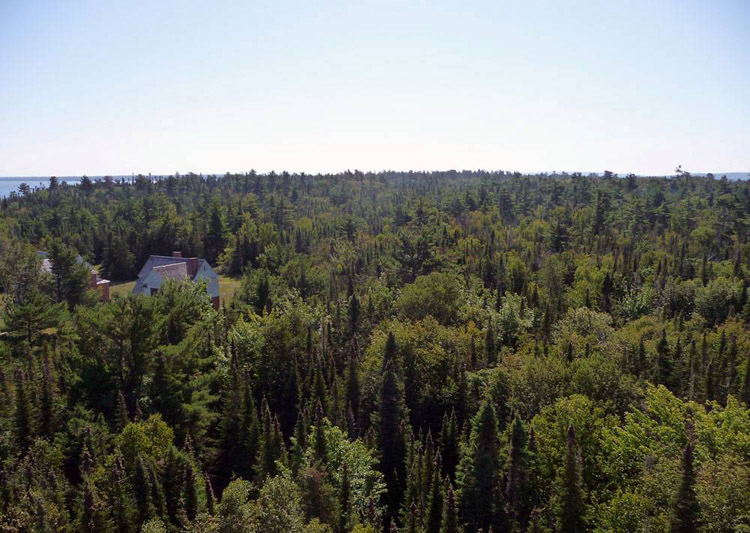
Landscape of Devils Island

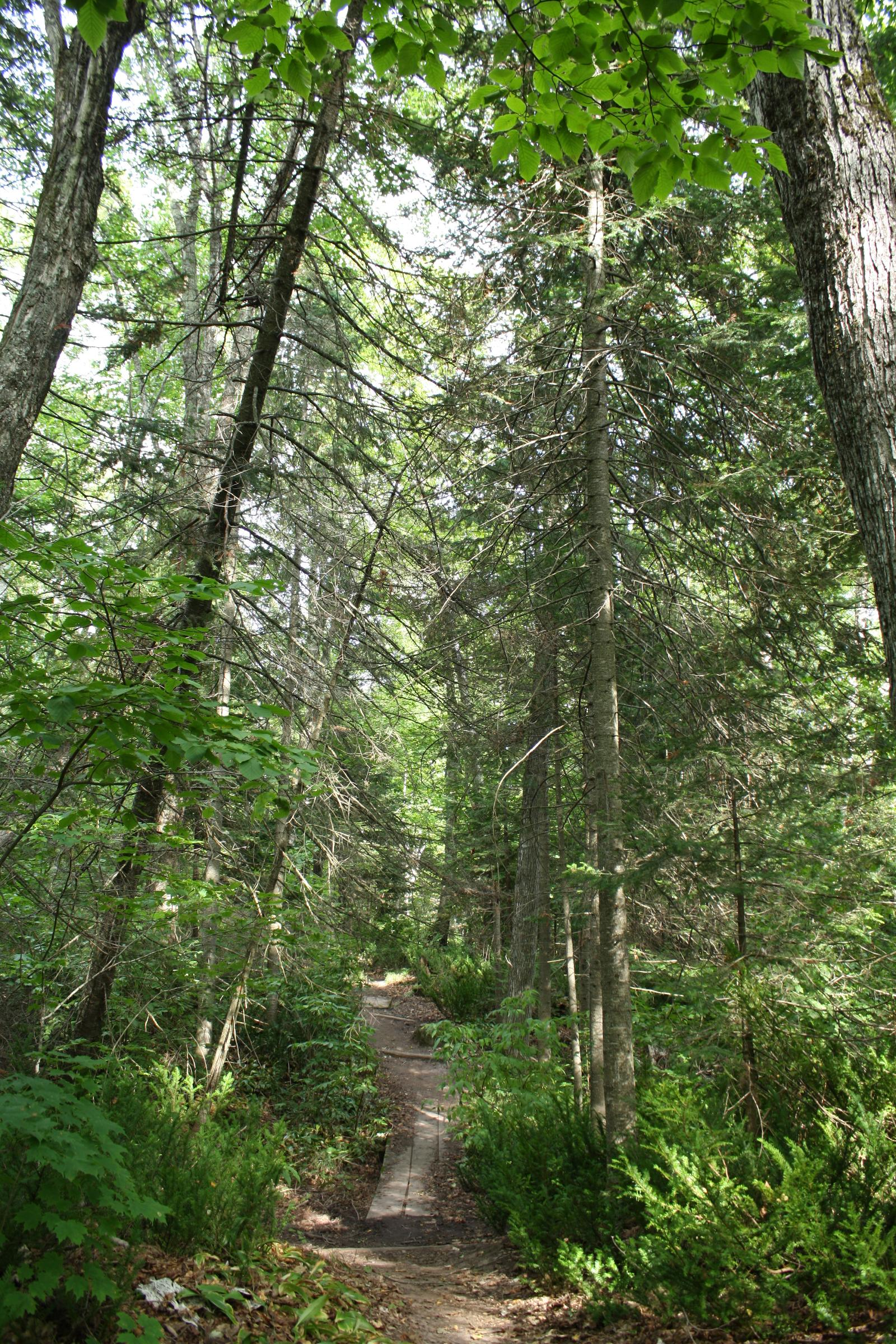
Trail on Raspberry Island

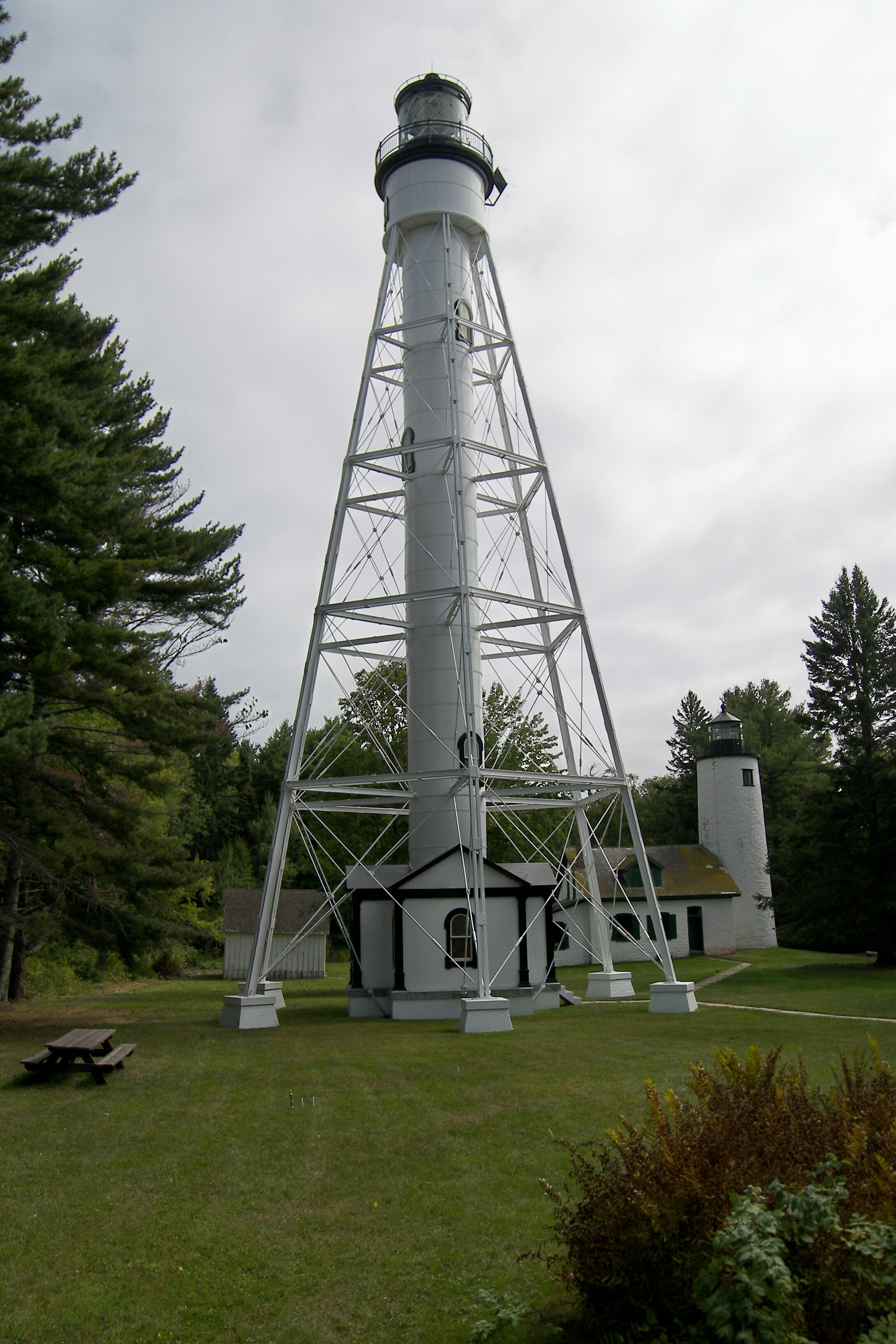
The two lighthouse towers on Michigan Island

The Apostle Islands are featured on Wisconsin's America the Beautiful quarter.
