= Crow Island =

Crow Island may refer to:

- Crow Island, Harpswell, Maine
- Crow Island, in Bermuda
- Crow Island (Massachusetts), an inhabited island in New Bedford Harbor in Fairhaven, Massachusetts
- Crow Island (New Brunswick), an undeveloped island in the West Isles Parish of Charlotte County, New Brunswick, Canada
- Crow Island Airport, a private airport in Stow, Massachusetts, United States
- Crow Island School, an elementary school in Winnetka, Illinois, United States
