= Old Bayfield County Courthouse =

- U.S. National Register of Historic Places
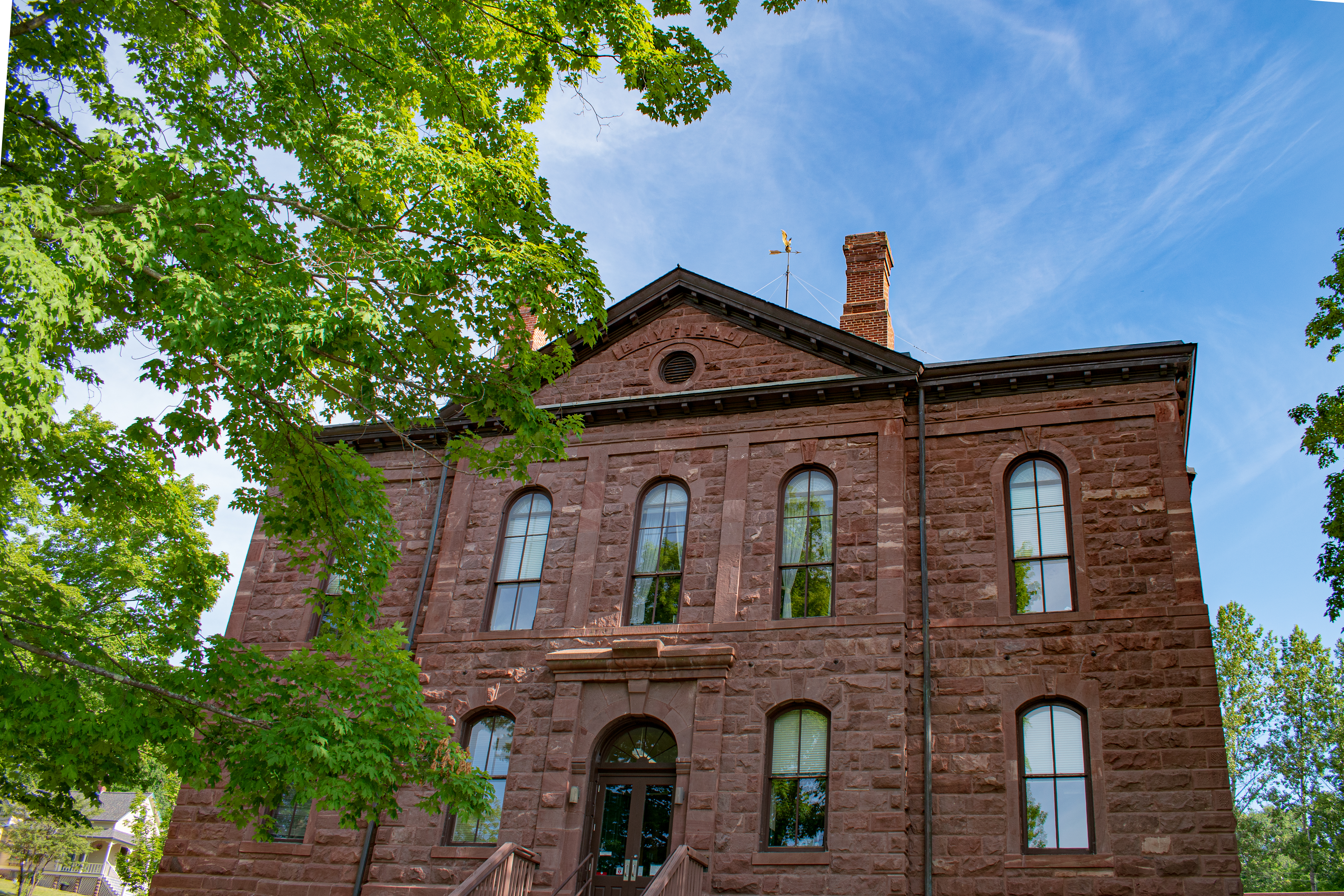
- Old Bayfield County Courthouse

- Location within Wisconsin
- Interactive map showing the location for Old Bayfield County Courthouse
- Location: Washington St. between 4th and 5th Sts., Bayfield, Wisconsin
- Coordinates: 46°48′47″N 90°49′13″W
- Area: less than one acre
- Built: 1884
- Architect: John Nader
- Architectural style: Neoclassical/Romanesque Revival
- NRHP reference No.: 74000058
- Added to NRHP: December 27, 1974

The Old Bayfield County Courthouse is located in Bayfield, Wisconsin.

== History ==
The courthouse was used for its original purpose until 1892, when the county seat of Bayfield County, Wisconsin was moved to Washburn, Wisconsin. Afterwards, the building was used as a school, a World War II prisoner-of-war camp, a community center and a warehouse.

Eventually, the building was taken over by the Bayfield Heritage Association and the Bayfield Historical Society. In 1974, it was added to the National Register of Historic Places and it was later added to the State Register of Historic Places in 1989. In 1976, the National Park Service began leasing the building and it has since become the headquarters of the Apostle Islands National Lakeshore.
