= Pilot Island NW Site =

- U.S. National Register of Historic Places
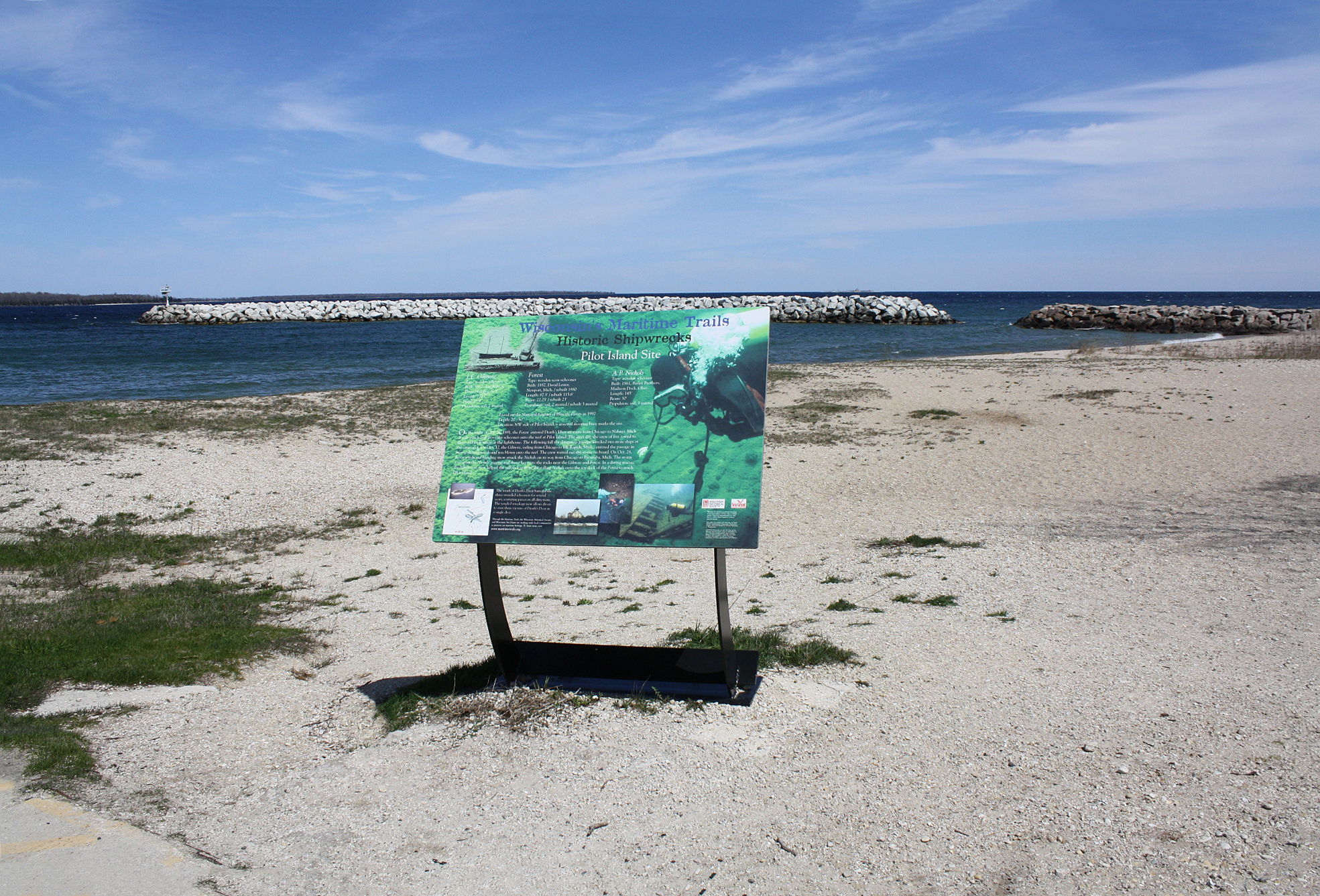
- Sign for the Pilot Island NW Site
- Nearest city: Washington, Wisconsin
- Area: 1.5 acres (0.61 ha)
- MPS: Great Lakes Shipwreck Sites of Wisconsin MPS
- NRHP reference No.: 92000103
- Added to NRHP: March 19, 1992

The Pilot Island NW Site is the site of three shipwrecks on the northwest side of Pilot Island in Door County, Wisconsin. The shipwrecks lie in Lake Michigan under 20 to 50 feet (6.1 to 15.2 m) of water; buoys placed by the Wisconsin Historical Society mark their locations. The first ship, the Forest, sank at a shoal on Pilot Island on October 28, 1891, while attempting to pass through Porte des Morts. In 1892, the J.E. Gilmore sank at the site while navigating the passage on October 17. The third ship, the A.P. Nichols, sank at the site in a storm on October 28 of the same year. The site was added to the National Register of Historic Places on March 19, 1992.
