= Oak Island (Wisconsin) =

Island in Wisconsin, United States

Coordinates: 46°56′14″N 090°43′42″W

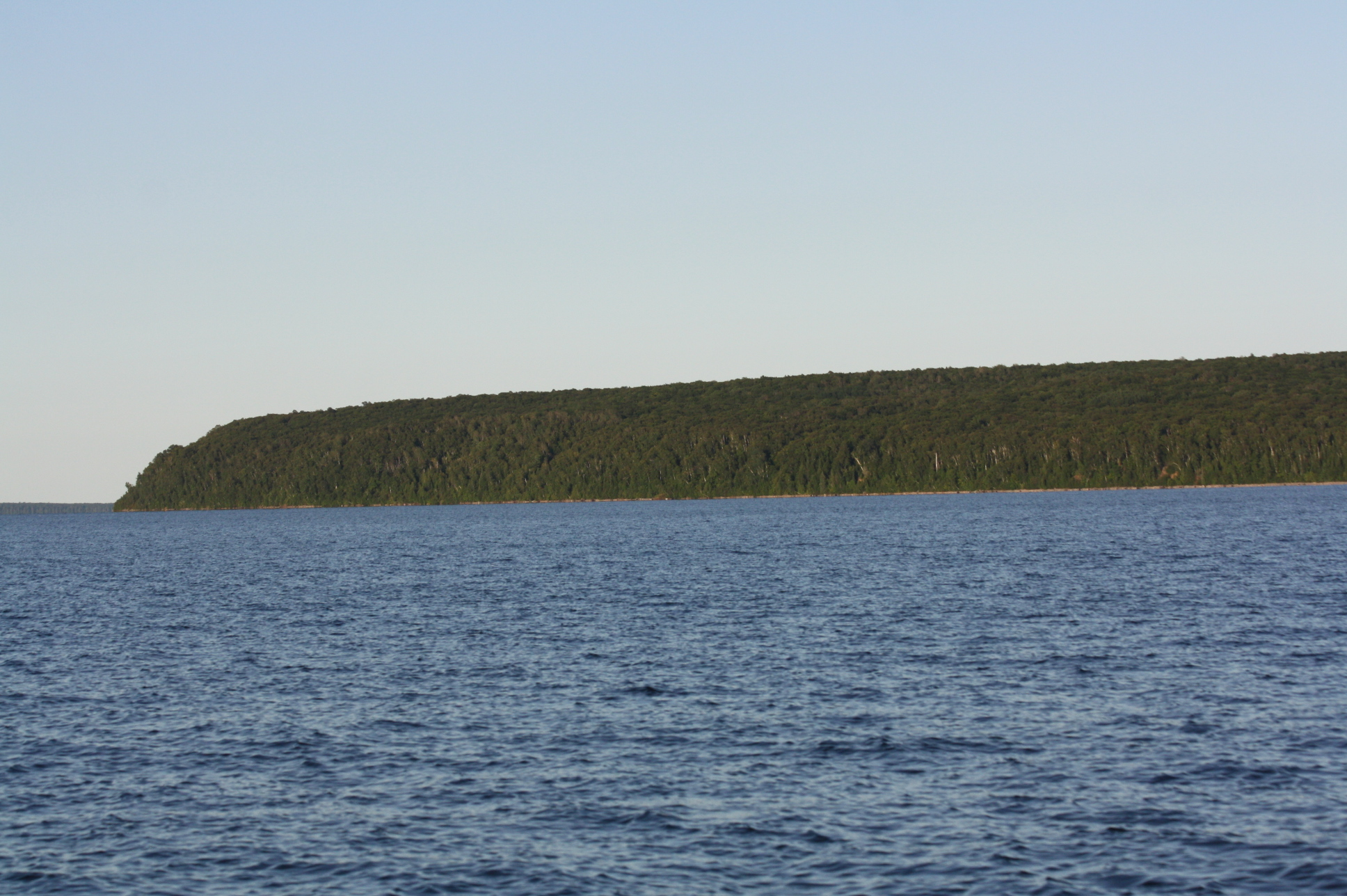
Oak Island

Oak Island is one of the Apostle Islands, in northern Wisconsin, in Lake Superior, and is part of the Apostle Islands National Lakeshore.
