= Cat Island (Wisconsin) =

Island in Lake Superior, US

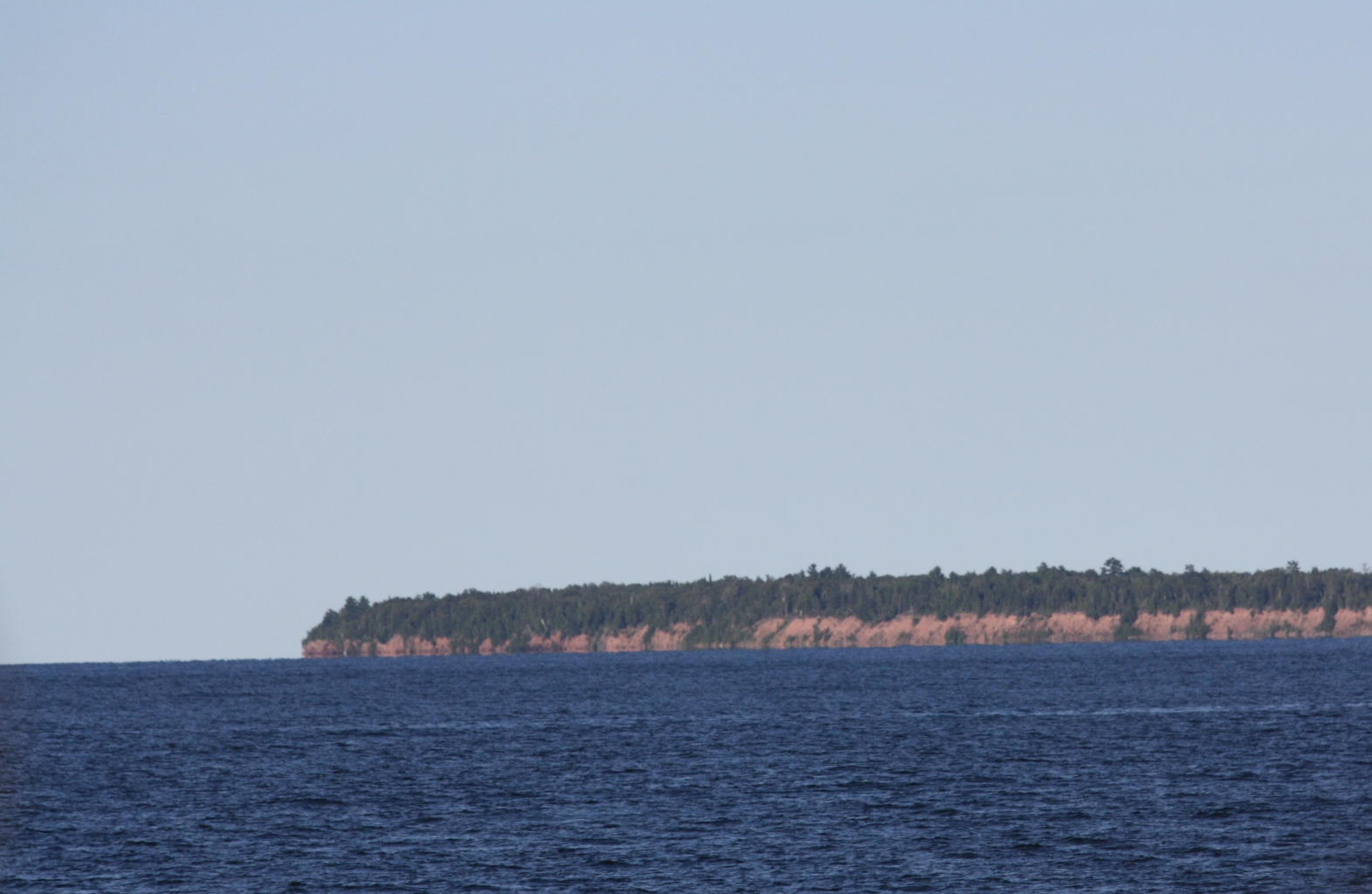
Cat Island

Cat Island is a Wisconsin island in Lake Superior. It is one of the Apostle Islands and a part of the Apostle Islands National Lakeshore. It is located at 47°00′48″N 090°33′33″W. Variant names include Caterhemlock Island and Kagagiwanijikag Miniss. According to USGS GNIS, there is a smaller Cat Island in Brown County, Wisconsin just off shore of the city of Green Bay.

Cat Island has gone by a number of names including Kagagiwanjikag Miniss (Ojibwe for 'Island of Hemlock Trees'), Texas Island, Hemlock Island and Shoe Island.
