= Devils Island (Wisconsin) =

Island in Wisconsin, United States

Devils Island Maji-manidoo-minis
- Uninhabited island
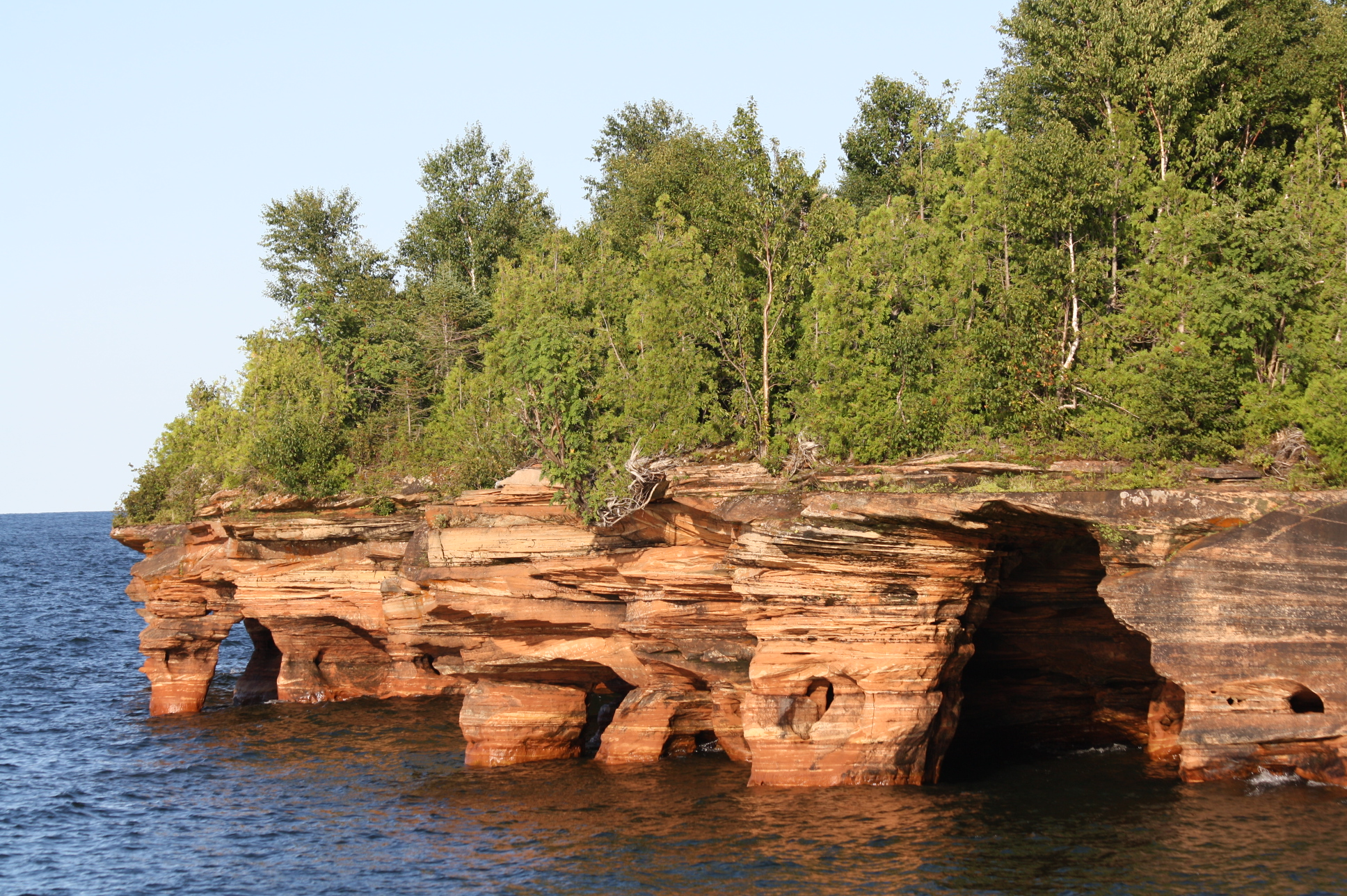
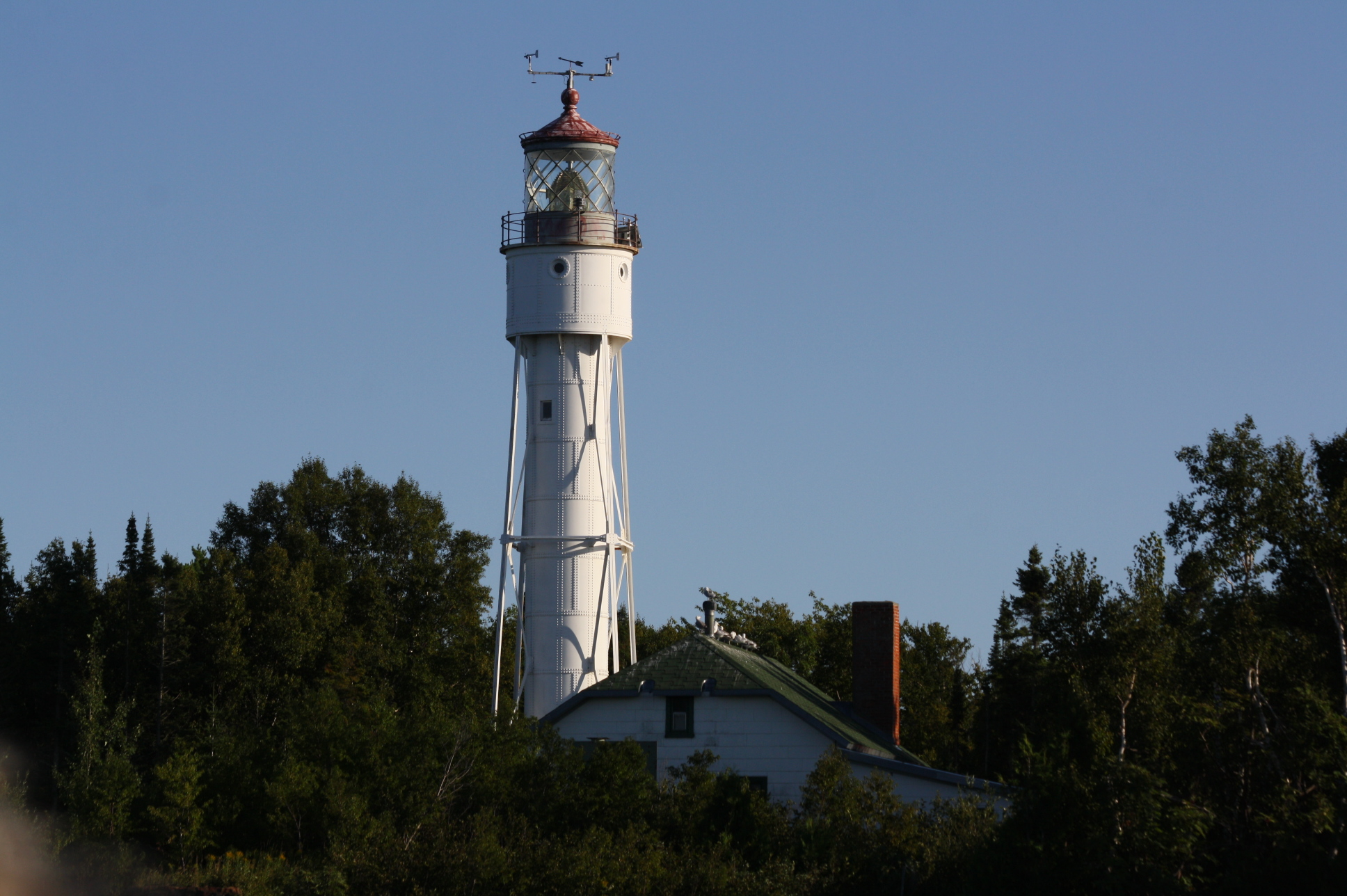
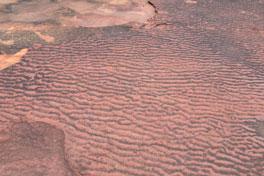
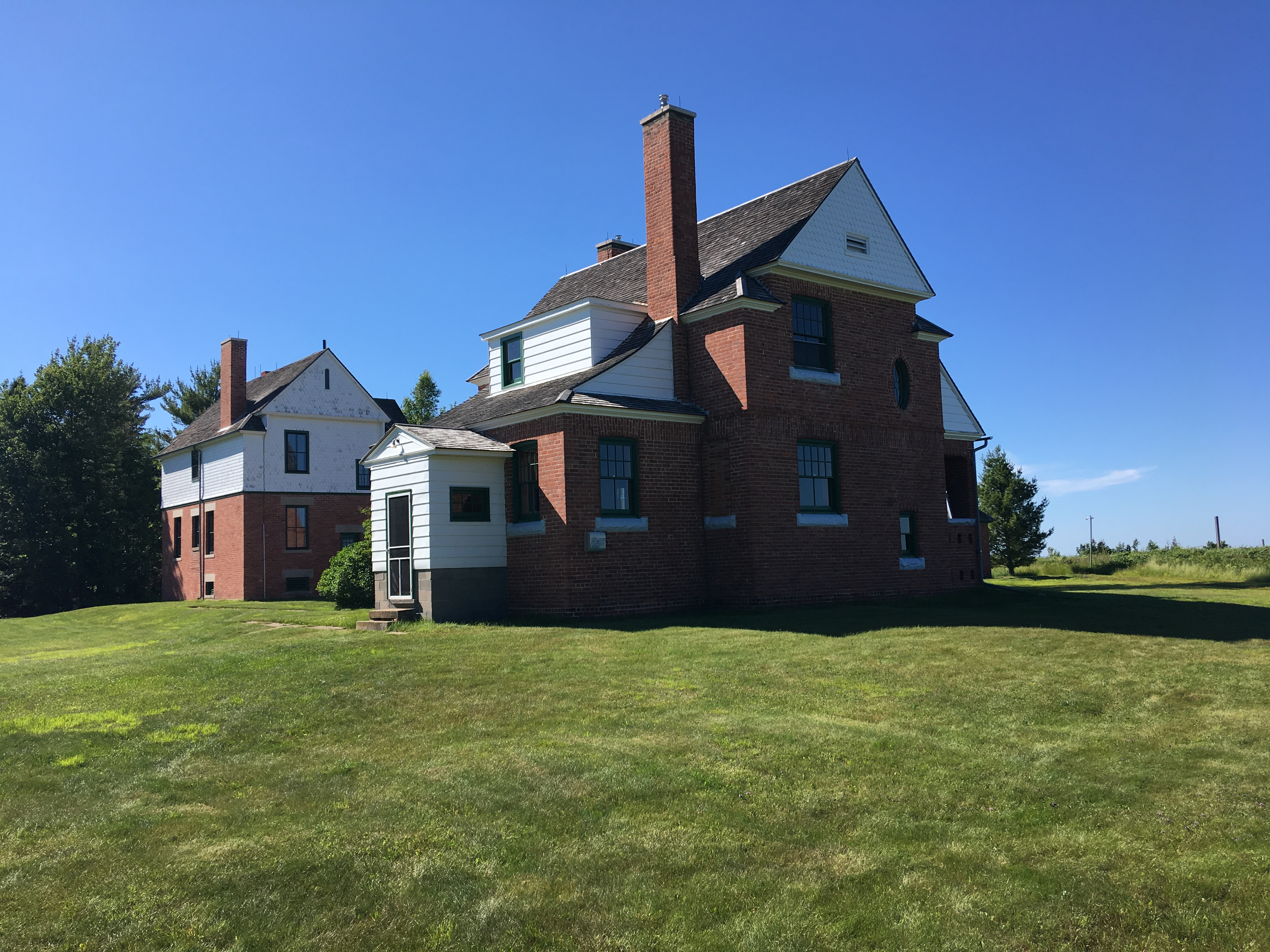
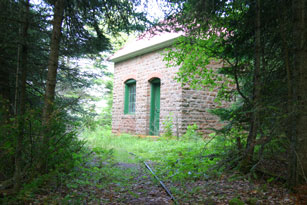
- Seacaves Devils Island Light Devils Island Sandstone Ripples Keeper's Quarters Devils Island Tramway Engine House
- Interactive map of Devils Island
- Coordinates: 47°04′15.6″N 90°43′33.9″W
- Country: United States
- State: Wisconsin
- Administered by: National Park Service

Area
  - Total: 318 acres (129 ha)
- Highest elevation: 652 ft (199 m)
- Lowest elevation (Lake Superior): 602 ft (183 m)

Population
  - Permanent: None
  - Summer: 1
- Website: NPS - Devil's Island

Devils Island (Note: Also historically known as Louisiana Island, Barney and Lamborn's Island, Brownstone Island, and Rabbit Island.) is an uninhabited island in Lake Superior's Apostle Islands archipelago in northern Wisconsin. The roughly 318 acre island has a maximum elevation of 652ft above sea level, which is 50ft above Lake Superior's official elevation of 602ft. The National Park Service (who manage it as part of the Apostle Islands National Lakeshore) occasionally station volunteers at the Keeper's Quarters during the summer.

The northern tip of Devils Island is the northernmost point of Wisconsin.

== Etymology ==
The primary Ojibwe name of the island is Maji-manidoo-minis (lit. 'Bad Spirit Island'). Though Ojibwe traditional beliefs have no exact equivalent to the Christian Satan, the Anishinaabe "bad/evil spirit(s)" was often used by missionaries to convey the theological concept of "the devil", hence the English translation to "Devils Island".

Former Lieutenant Governor of Wisconsin, Sam Fifield, wrote that the indigenous population "in the early days" believed it was the home of the Matchi-manitou (lit. 'Evil spirit'), whom Kitchie-Manitouo (lit. 'Great Spirit') had imprisoned there.

When surf on the lake is heavy, the waves thunder and boom in the island's extensive sea caves. The rumbling can be heard even well away from the shoreline, which local residents claim that the Ojibwe interpreted this noise as the sound of bad spirits.

Another traditional name was Waaboozo-minis (lit. 'Rabbit Island'), owing to the many snowshoe hares that still inhabit the island today.

== Snowshoe hares ==
The island is of particular ecological interest due to its unusually high population of snowshoe hares, who are protected from carnivorous predators like the gray wolf or Canada lynx by the island's geography. A 2019 study found the rate of snowshoe hares to be about ten times higher than the other Apostle Islands. This high population was also noted to decrease the hares' habitat quality due to their uncontrolled overgrazing.

A ten-year NPS study conducted from 2011 to 2021, counted an average population density of nearly 1 hare per acre on the island. For reference, the next highest density in the comparison was 0.137 hares per acre on the neighboring South Twin Island, around seven times less than Devils Island.

== Geology ==
The island is perhaps most visited for the dramatic rock formations and sea caves that wrap around its northern shore. It is popular with kayakers who enjoy meandering in and out of the caves on calm days. The caves were sculpted from the billion year old sandstone bedrock exposed through the island's surface. The red and gold sandstone was deposited over the area by wandering streams from western hills. The undulating of the climate over about a million year period laid a sandstone crust that is about 1800 feet thick. They are colorfully stratified, similar to ripples on the sandy bottom of a lake or stream caused by wind, waves, or current. The ripples on these rocks are from gentle waves that passed 1 billion years ago.

== Tourism ==
The Devils Island Light located at the northern end of the island is staffed by a volunteer ranger during the busy months of the summer. Accompanied by the volunteer, visitors may climb the tower, and go inside the original keeper's quarters, built in 1894.

The lighthouse contains a 3rd order fresnel lens, the only Apostle Islands lighthouse to have its original lens. Close examination of the lens shows multiple cracks and damage that occurred when the US Coast Guard removed the lens in 1989. After local outcry and legal action, the Park Service was able to return the lens to the lighthouse in 1992.

Visitors are free to wander the grounds and enjoy many trails found on the island. Starting at the light station, they include a short trail to the east "landing", a loop trail to the west "landing", and a longer trail down the center of the island to the boathouse and dock at the south end. To the east is an old engine house that was used to haul supplies up from the landing. The building, thought to have been finished in 1901, is the only one built of sandstone quarried from the island. The bulldozer that was used to make these trails can be found along the trail to the west landing.

A rare heath rush (grass) found on Devil's Island is thought to have been carried to the island on the tracks of the army surplus bulldozer which was once used in Greenland.

== See also ==
- Devils Island Sandstone
- Devils Island Light
