= South Twin Island (Wisconsin) =

Island in Wisconsin, United States

Coordinates: 47°02′00″N 090°38′41″W

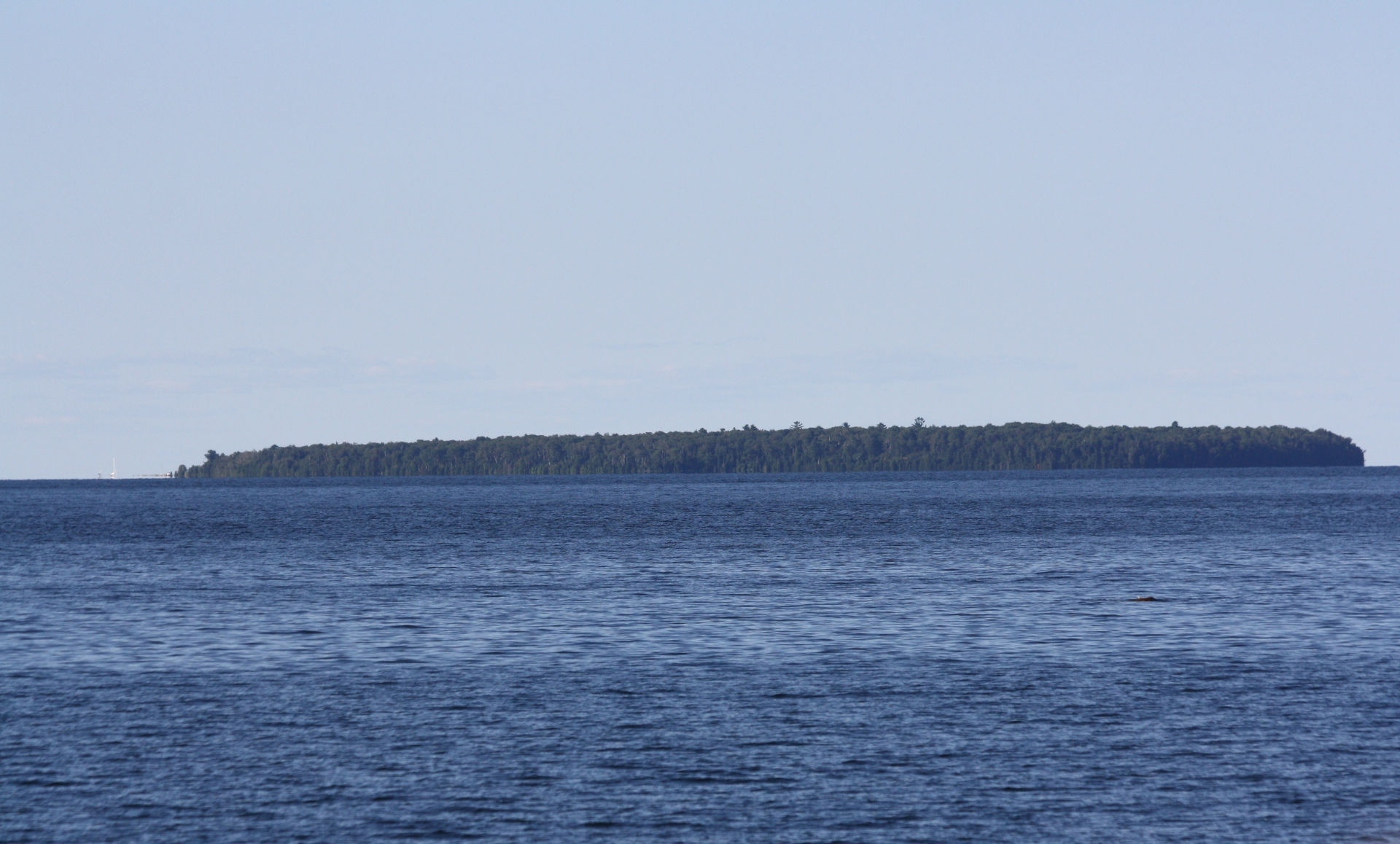
Island

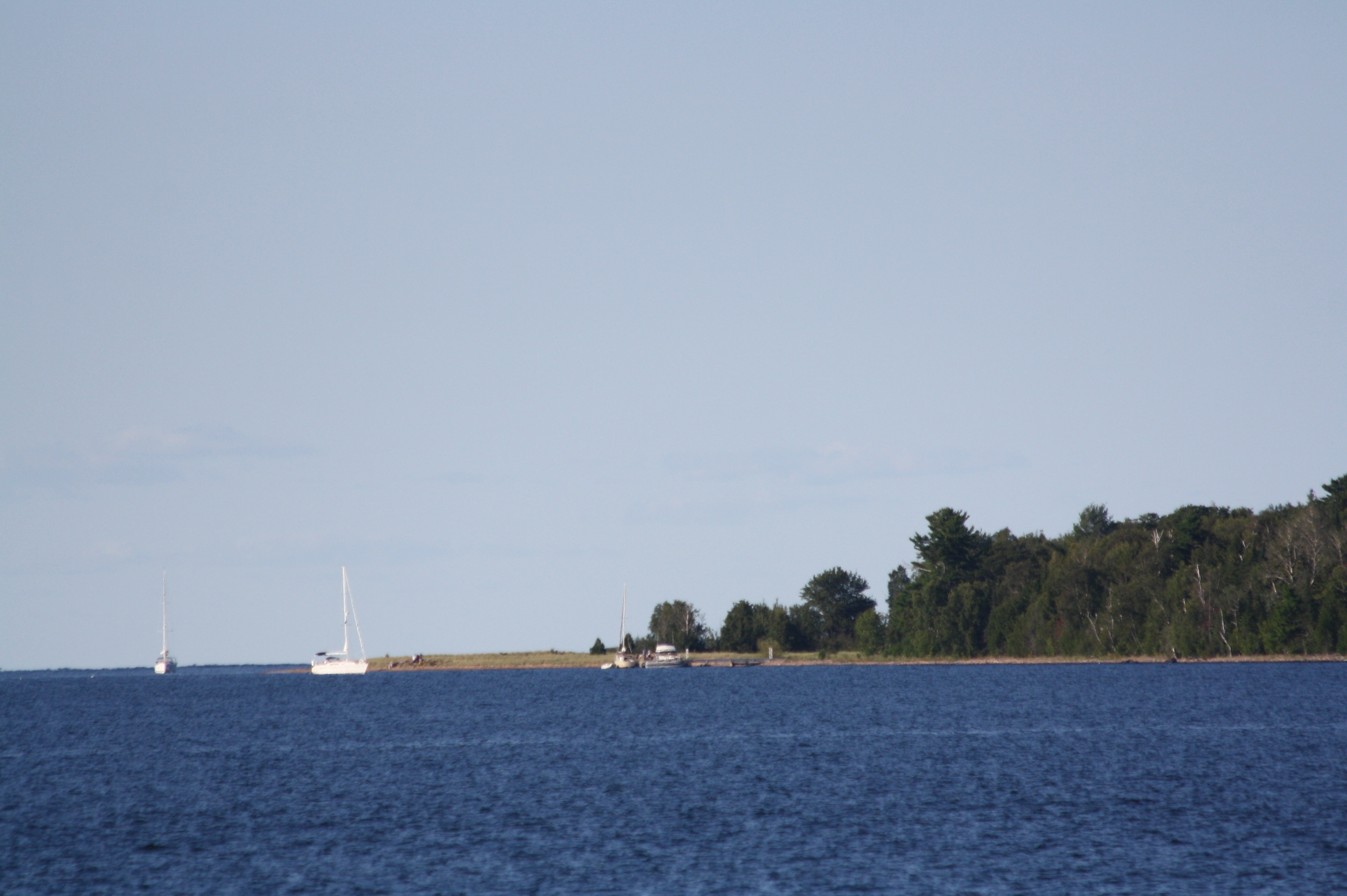
Beach

South Twin Island is one of the Apostle Islands in northern Wisconsin, in Lake Superior, and is part of the Apostle Islands National Lakeshore.
