= North Twin Island (Wisconsin) =

Island in Wisconsin, United States

Coordinates: 47°04′04″N 090°35′14″W

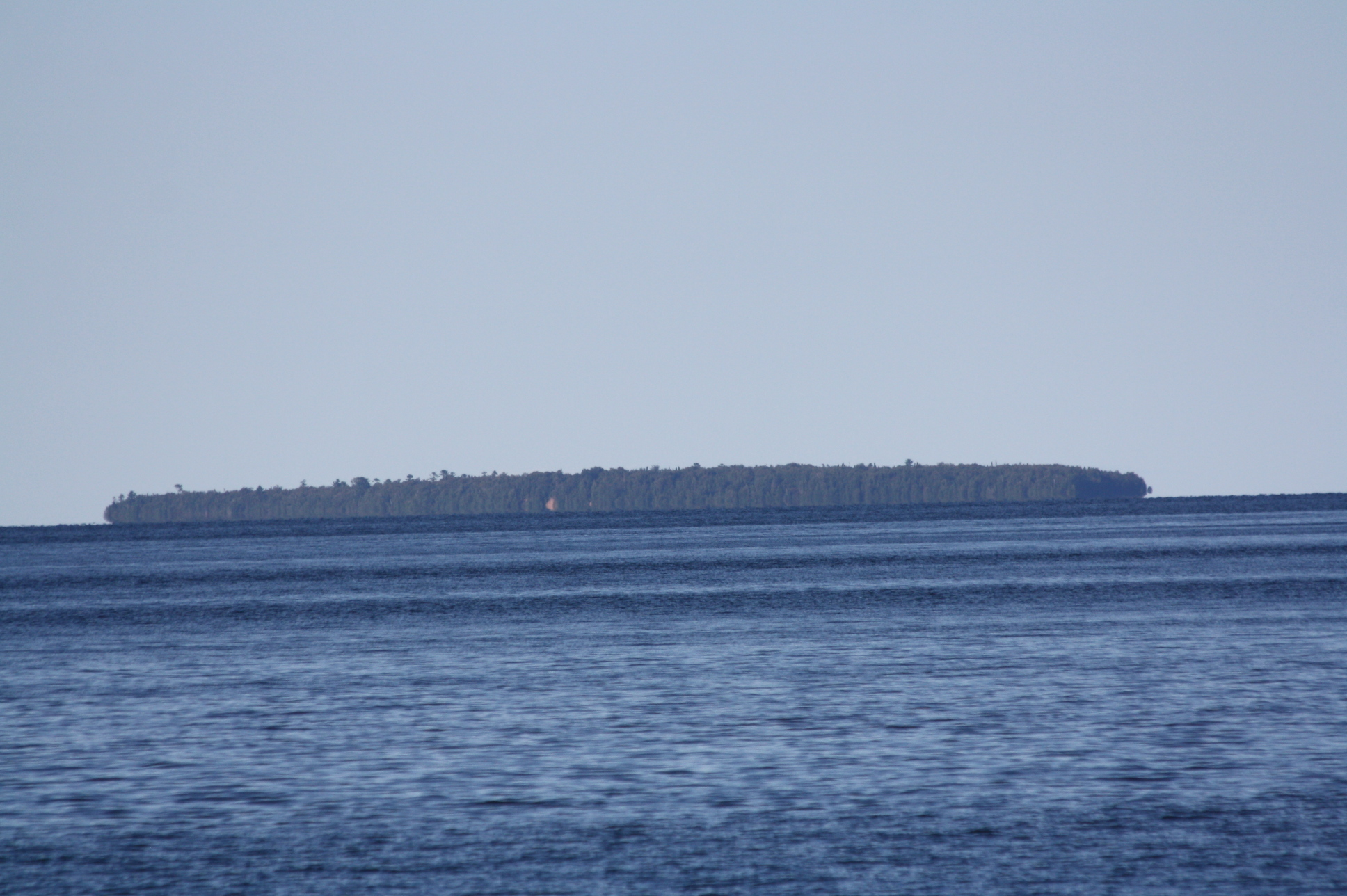
Island

North Twin Island is one of the Apostle Islands in northern Wisconsin, in Lake Superior, and is part of the Apostle Islands National Lakeshore.
