= Ironwood Island (Wisconsin) =

Island in Wisconsin, United States

Coordinates: 47°00′01″N 090°36′56″W

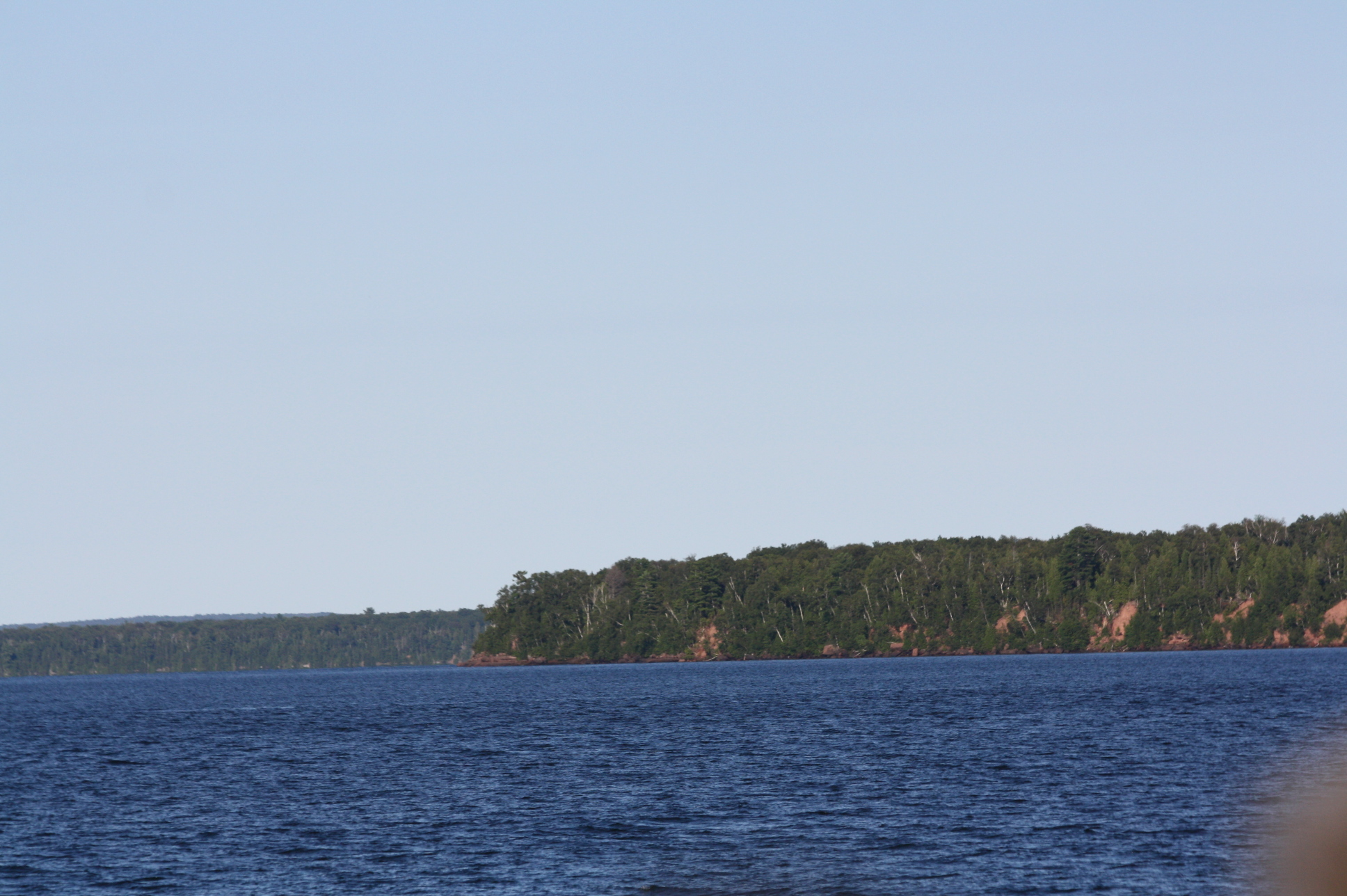
Island

Ironwood Island is one of the Apostle Islands in northern Wisconsin, in Lake Superior, and is part of the Apostle Islands National Lakeshore.
