= Goat Island (Missouri River) =

River island of the Missourt River, U.S.

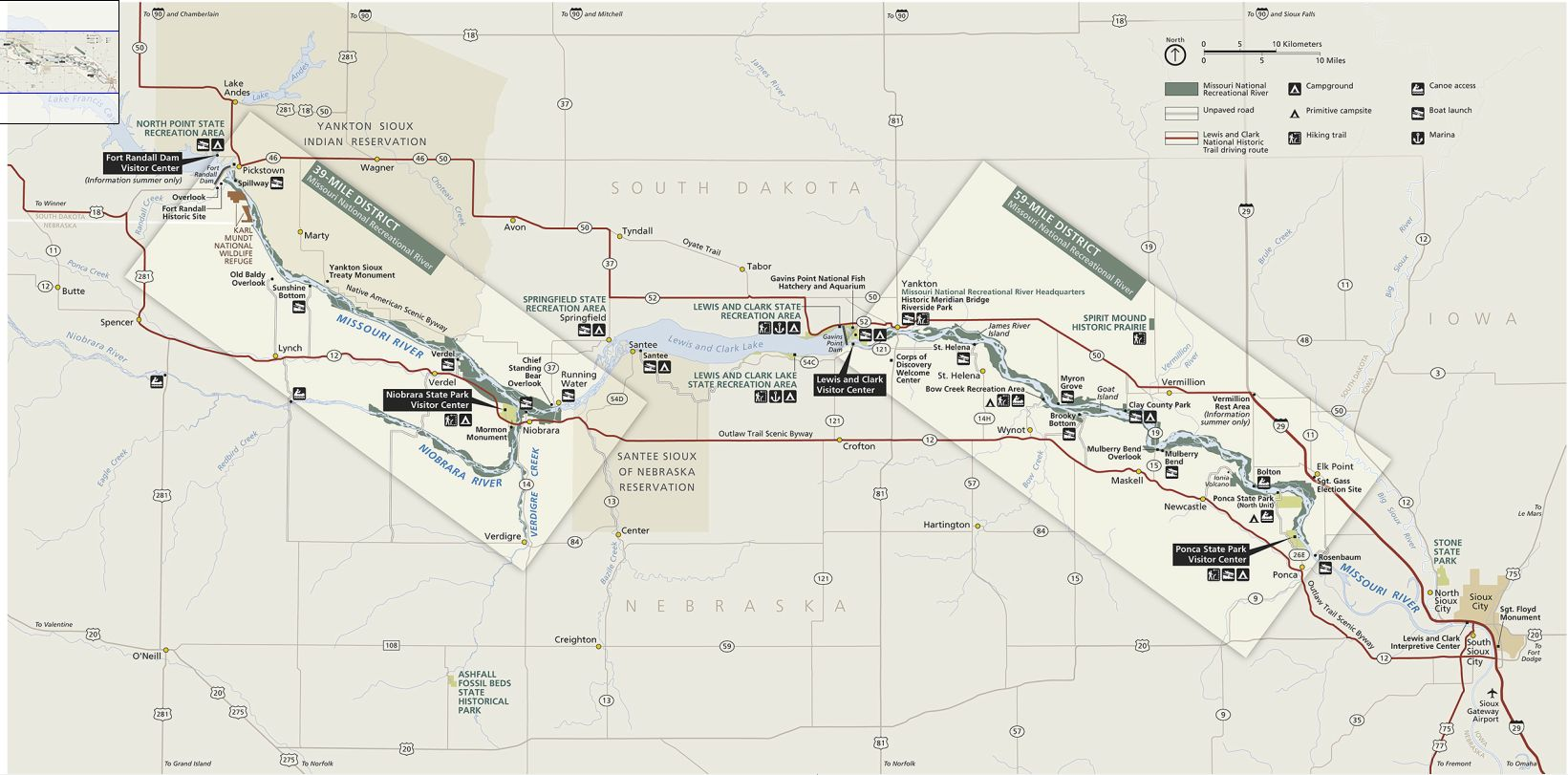
- NPS Map of the Missouri National Recreational River
- Interactive map of Goat Island

Geography
- Coordinates: 42.766607°N 97.071020°W
- Adjacent to: Missouri River

Administration
- United States
- U.S. Government: U.S. National Park Service
- Location: Nebraska and South Dakota

Additional information
- Official website: MNRR - Goat Island

Goat Island is an island in the Missouri River in Cedar County, Nebraska, with a small portion extending into Clay County, South Dakota in the United States. It is open to the public as a part of the Missouri National Recreational River, a unit of the National Park Service.

The island was never surveyed following South Dakota and Nebraska Statehood and ownership of the island was disputed. It wasn't until 2016 that it was agreed upon that the island would be managed by the National Park Service as a part of the Missouri National Recreational River.
