= Crow Island (Massachusetts) =

Island in Bristol County, Massachusetts, United States

Coordinates: 41°38′15″N 70°54′38″W

Crow Island is an inhabited island located in New Bedford Harbor in Fairhaven, Massachusetts.
