= Pilot Island =

Island in Wisconsin, United States

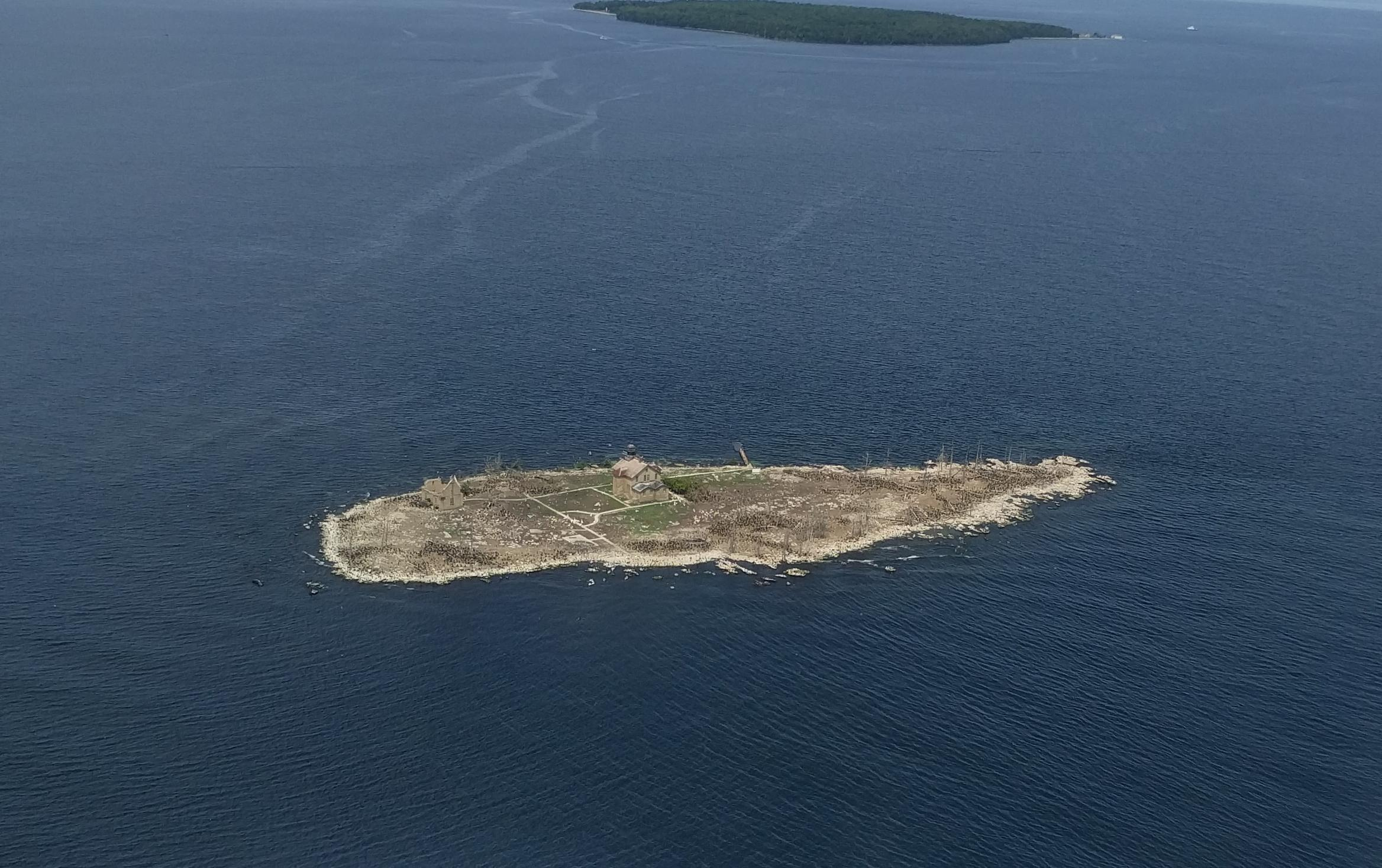
- Taken July 21, 2019

- Location within Wisconsin Location within the United States

Geography
- Location: Door County, Wisconsin
- Coordinates: 45°17′06″N 086°55′11″W
- Adjacent to: Lake Michigan
- Highest elevation: 581 ft (177.1 m)

Administration
- United States

Pilot Island is an island in Lake Michigan in the Town of Washington, in Door County, Wisconsin; it is part of Green Bay National Wildlife Refuge. An abandoned lighthouse, the Pilot Island Light, rests on the island, and three shipwrecks rest in the Pilot Island NW Site. Pilot Island lies in the middle of the southern opening of the Porte des Morts passage off the tip of the Door Peninsula.

Pilot Island earned its name due to the use of the island as a "pilot" by sailors going through the dangerous Porte des Morts passage.

The lighthouse started operations in 1858 and continues to this day to be a maritime navigational aid. The island was often foggy and the fog signal would run for long periods of time. The fog signal was discontinued in 1962.

== Gallery ==
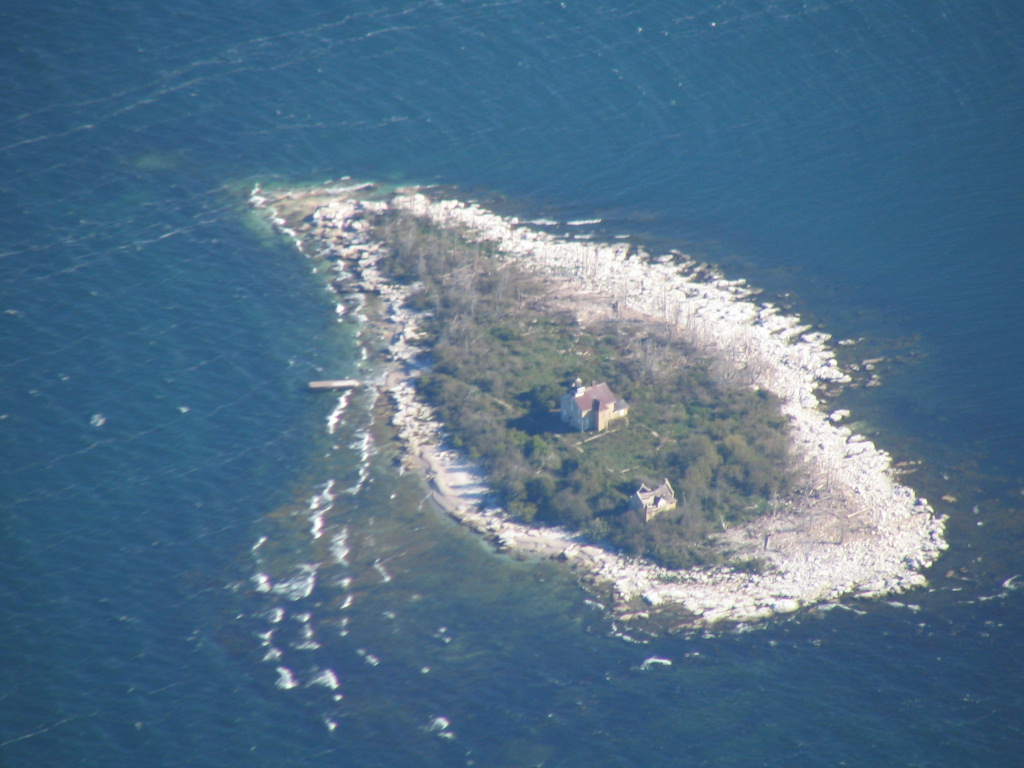
October 2, 2004

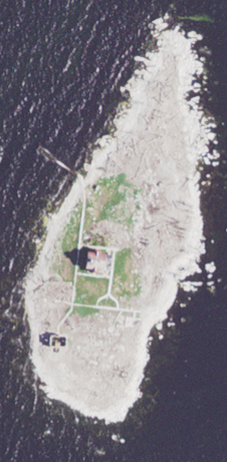
July 28, 2020

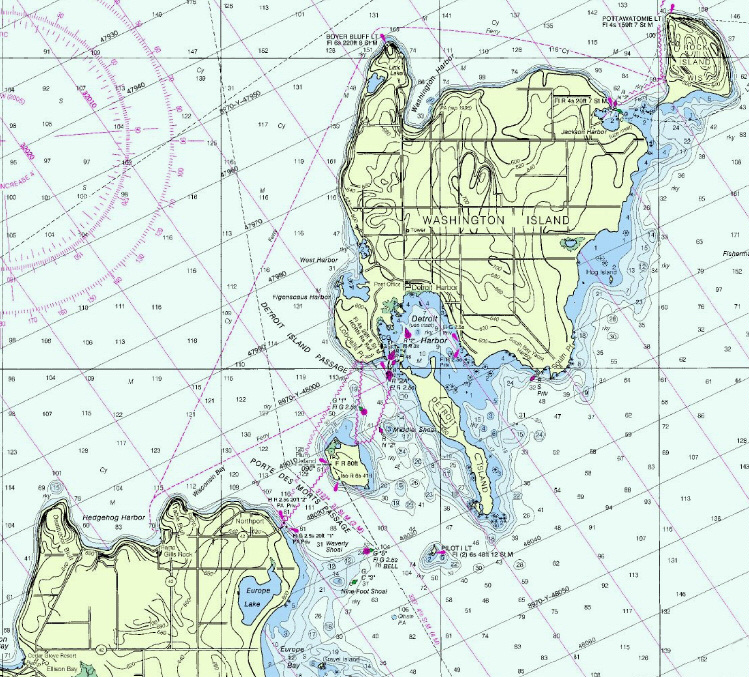
Map of Death's Door islands. Pilot island is located in the southeastern portion.

=== From the lake ===
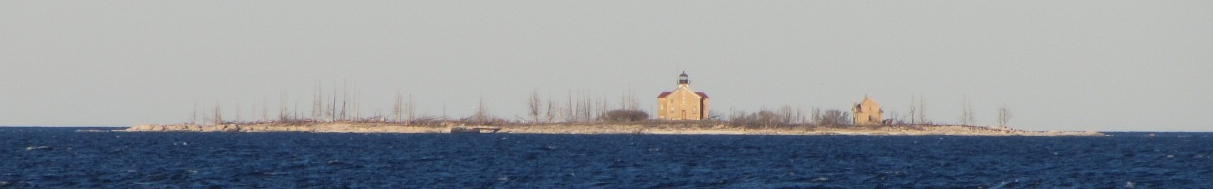
May 23, 2013

=== Nearby islands ===
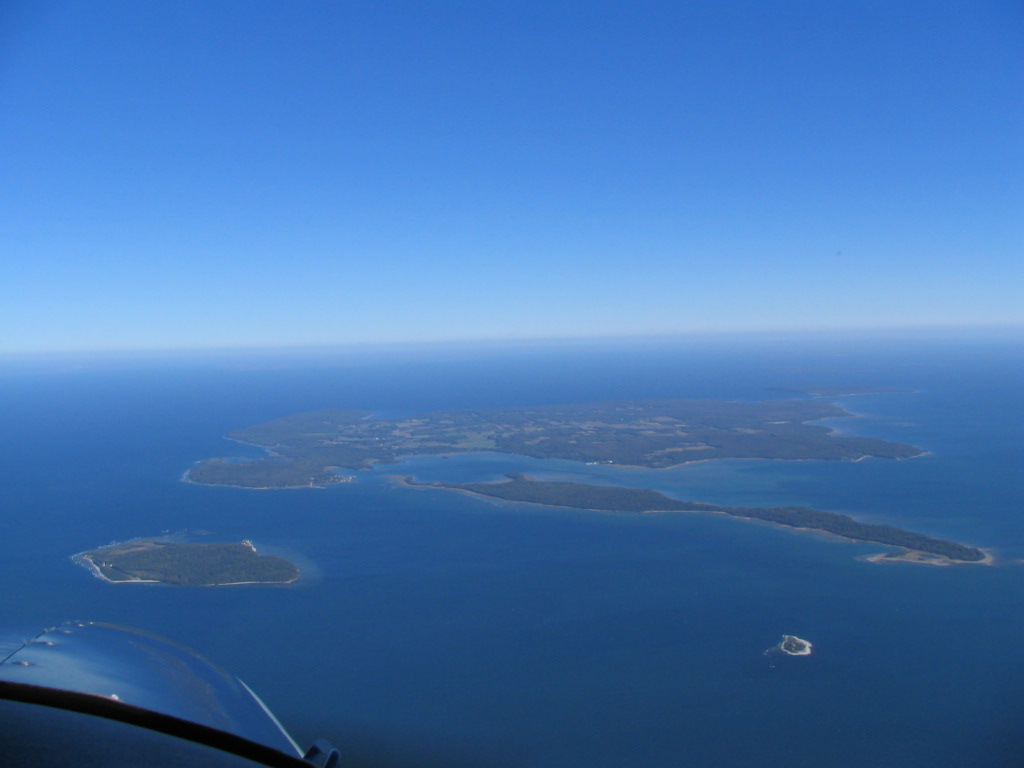
Pilot Island is the small island at the lower right, with the larger Plum Island is at the lower left. Above Pilot Island is the long and narrow Detroit Island, with Washington Island in the distance.
