= Otter Island (Wisconsin) =

Island in Wisconsin, United States

Coordinates: 46°59′46″N 090°41′28″W

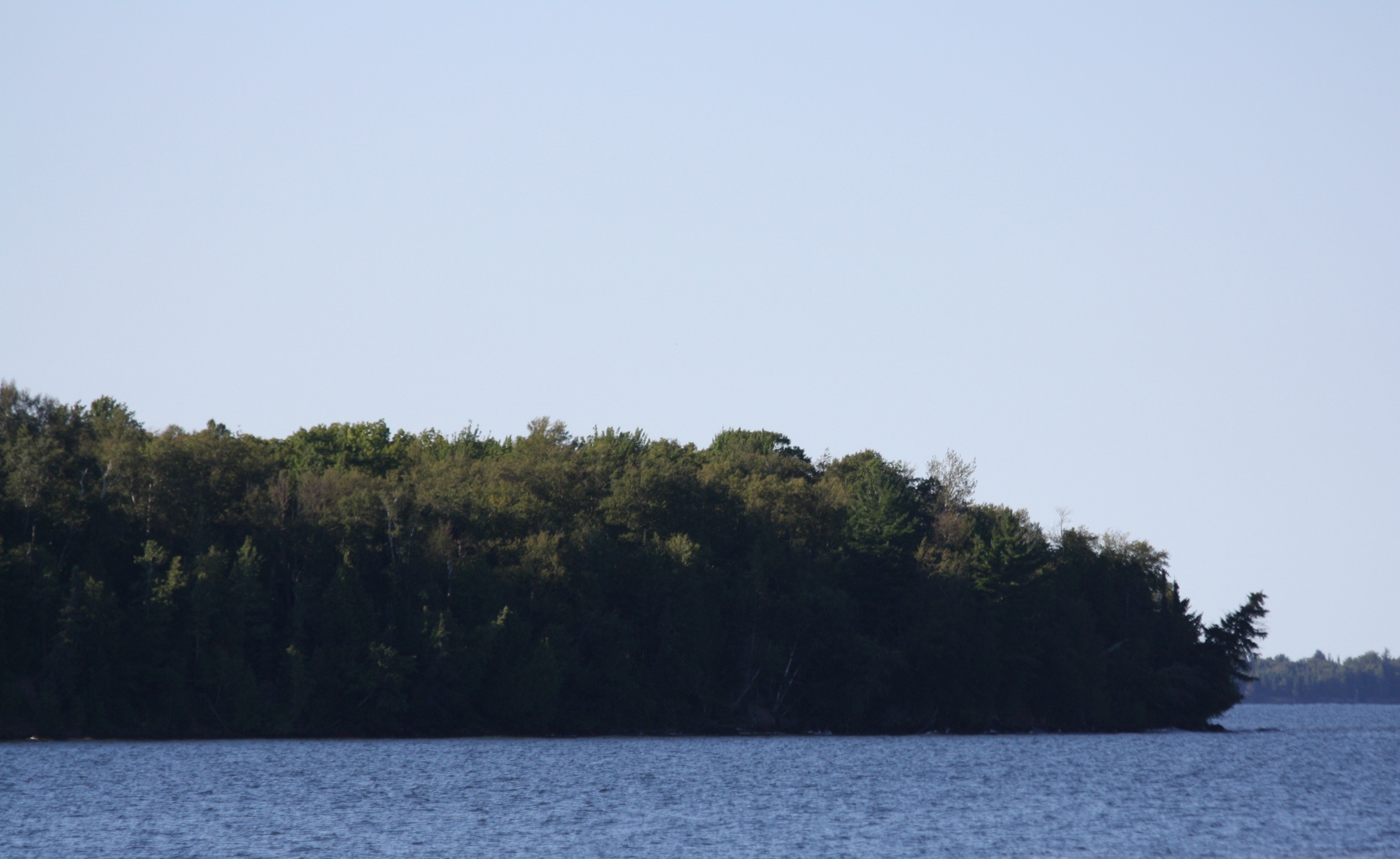
Otter Island

Otter Island is one of the Apostle Islands in Northern Wisconsin, in Lake Superior, and is part of the Apostle Islands National Lakeshore. There is another Otter Island in Iowa County, in the Wisconsin River.
