= List of escarpments =

A list of escarpments follows below. It includes escarpments on all continents of the planet Earth. Also included are escarpments (often referred to as rupes) on Mars, Mercury, and Venus, as well as on natural satellites of some of the planets (Earth's Moon and Uranus's Miranda and Titania) and select asteroids.

== Planets ==
=== Earth ===
==== Africa ====
- Elgeyo Escarpment (Great Rift Valley)
- Great Escarpment, Southern Africa
  - Including the Drakensberg and God's Window in Mpumalanga's Eastern Escarpment
- Bandiagara Escarpment (Mali)
- Zambezi Escarpment (Zambia)
- East coast, Madagascar

==== Antarctica ====
- Usas Escarpment

==== Asia ====
- Sharon Escarpment, Israel
- Tuwaiq, Saudi Arabia
- Vindhya Range, India
- Western Ghats, India
- Wulian Feng, China

==== Australia and New Zealand ====
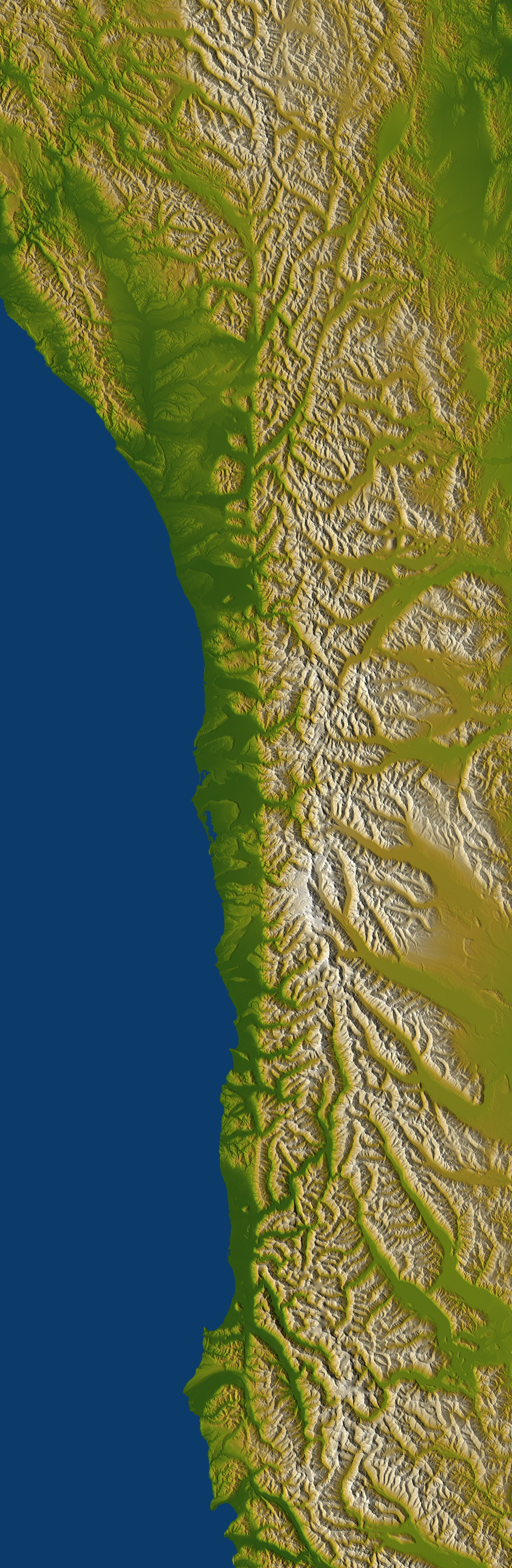
Shaded and colored image from the Shuttle Radar Topography Mission—shows an elevation model of New Zealand's Alpine Fault running about 500 km (300 mi) long. The escarpment is flanked by a chain of hills squeezed between the fault and the mountains of New Zealand's Southern Alps. Northeast is towards the top.

- Australia
  - Great Escarpment, Australia
  - Darling Scarp
  - Illawarra Escarpment
  - Lake George Escarpment
  - Nullarbor Escarpment
- New Zealand
  - The western slope of the Southern Alps (along the Alpine Fault)
  - The Kaimai escarpment, above the Hauraki Plains
  - The Paekākāriki escarpment between Paekākāriki and Pukerua Bay

==== Europe ====
- England
  - Cotswold escarpment
  - Chiltern escarpment
  - Mountjoy, Durham
  - North Downs
  - South Downs
  - A common placename denominating an escarpment in England is "edge" as in
    - Alderley Edge
    - Edge Hill famous as the place of the first battle of the English Civil War
    - Kinver Edge
    - The Lincoln Edge
    - Stanage Edge
    - Wenlock Edge
- Scotland
  - Quiraing, Trotternish, Isle of Skye
- Wales
  - Eglwyseg
  - Black Mountain (range)
  - Black Mountains, Wales
  - Pen y Fan
- France
  - La Côte d'Or is famous for its wines and has given its name to a département, Côte-d'Or.
  - Le Pays de Bray, a clay vale enclosed by chalk escarpments.
- Sweden, Estonia and Russia
  - Baltic Klint
  - Gotland–Saaremaa Klint
  - South Småland-Sub-Cambrian escarpment
- Malta
  - Victoria Lines
  - Malta Escarpment (underwater)

==== North America ====
- Atlantic Seaboard Fall Line
- Florida Escarpment, Gulf of Mexico
- Sigsbee Escarpment, Gulf of Mexico
- Canada
  - Cape Hotham Escarpment (Nunavut)
  - Devil's Rock (Lake Temiskaming, Ontario)
  - Eagle Hills Escarpment (Saskatchewan)
  - Eardley Escarpment (Mattawa Fault, Gatineau Park, Quebec)
  - Etsho Escarpment (British Columbia)
  - Long Point Escarpment (Ontario)
  - Manitoba Escarpment (Manitoba, Saskatchewan)
  - Mess Creek Escarpment (British Columbia)
  - Naujan Escarpment (Nunavut)
  - Niagara Escarpment (Ontario)
  - Onondaga (geological formation) (Ontario)
  - Pembina Escarpment (Manitoba)
  - Scarborough Bluffs (Toronto, Ontario)
  - Weston Escarpment (Nunavut)
- United States

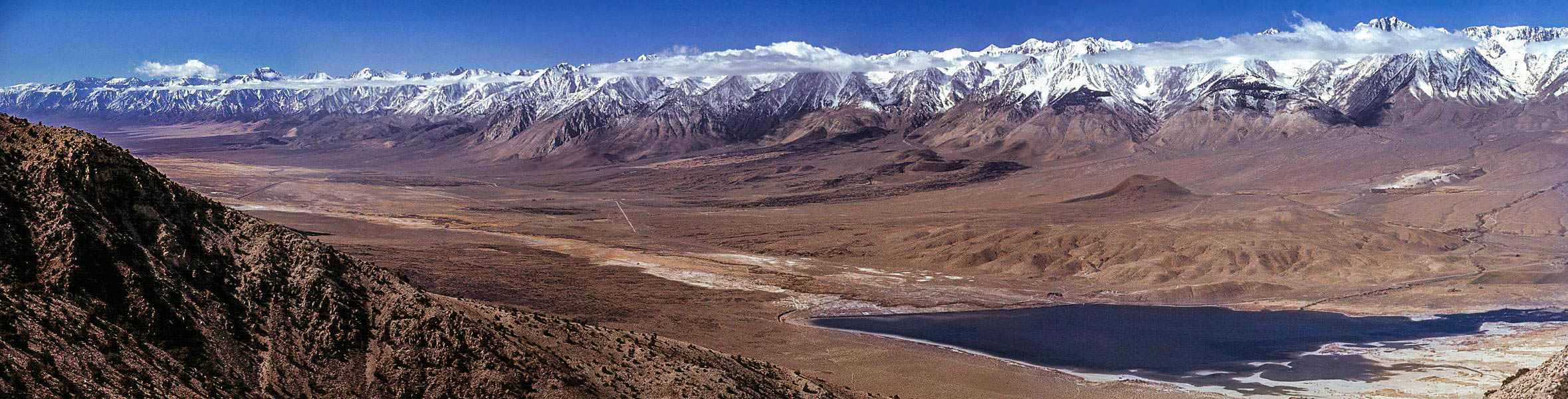
The Sierra Escarpment in California

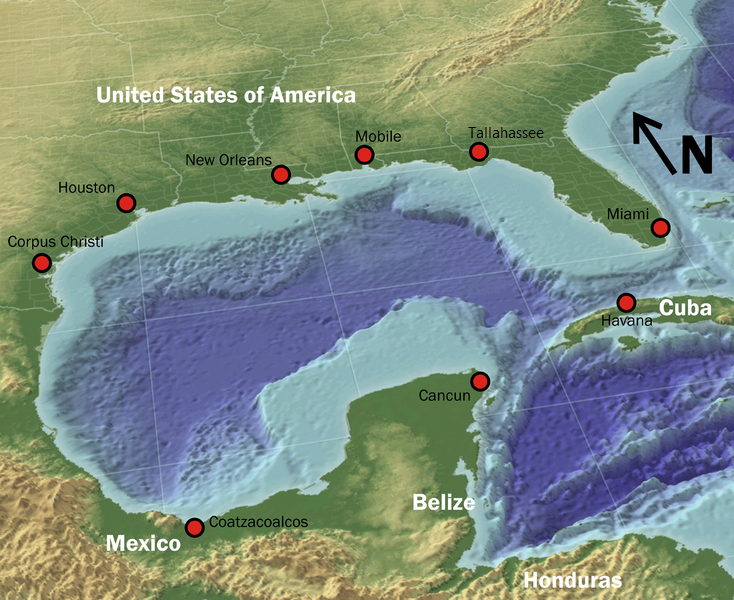
At the Florida Escarpment, seen in the eastern Gulf of Mexico, the sea bed drops precipitously from less than 300 to 3,000 m (1,000 to 10,000 ft) over a short distance.

  - Allegheny Front (West Virginia-Maryland-Pennsylvania)
  - Blue Ridge Escarpment (North Carolina–Virginia)
  - Balcones Fault (Texas)
  - Bergen Hill (New Jersey)
  - Black River Escarpment (Wisconsin)
  - Book Cliffs (Colorado–Utah)
  - Caprock Escarpment (Texas)
  - Catskill Escarpment (New York)
  - The Chinese Wall (Montana)
  - Cody Scarp (Florida)
  - Devil's Slide (California)
  - Helderberg Escarpment (New York)
  - Hell's Half Acre (Wyoming)
  - Knobstone Escarpment (Indiana)
  - Lewiston Hill (Idaho-Washington)
  - Long Point Escarpment (New York)
  - Magnesian Escarpment (Wisconsin)
  - Mescalero Ridge (New Mexico)
  - Missouri Escarpment (North Dakota)
  - Mogollon Rim (Arizona)
  - Muldraugh Hill (Kentucky)
  - Niagara Escarpment (New York, Michigan, Wisconsin, Illinois)
  - Onondaga (geological formation) (New York)
  - Pine Ridge (Nebraska–South Dakota)
  - Pembina Escarpment (North Dakota)
  - Portage Escarpment (Ohio)
  - Potrero Hills in (California)
  - Pottsville Escarpment (Kentucky–Tennessee)
  - The Rimrocks (Montana)
  - Sierra Nevada eastern slope (California)
- The Caribbean
  - Bahamas Escarpment (Bahamas)

==== South America ====
- Brazil
  - Great Escarpment, Brazil
    - Serra do Mar (São Paulo)
  - Serra da Mantiqueira (São Paulo, Minas Gerais and Rio de Janeiro)
- Chile
  - West Andean Escarpment

=== Mars ===
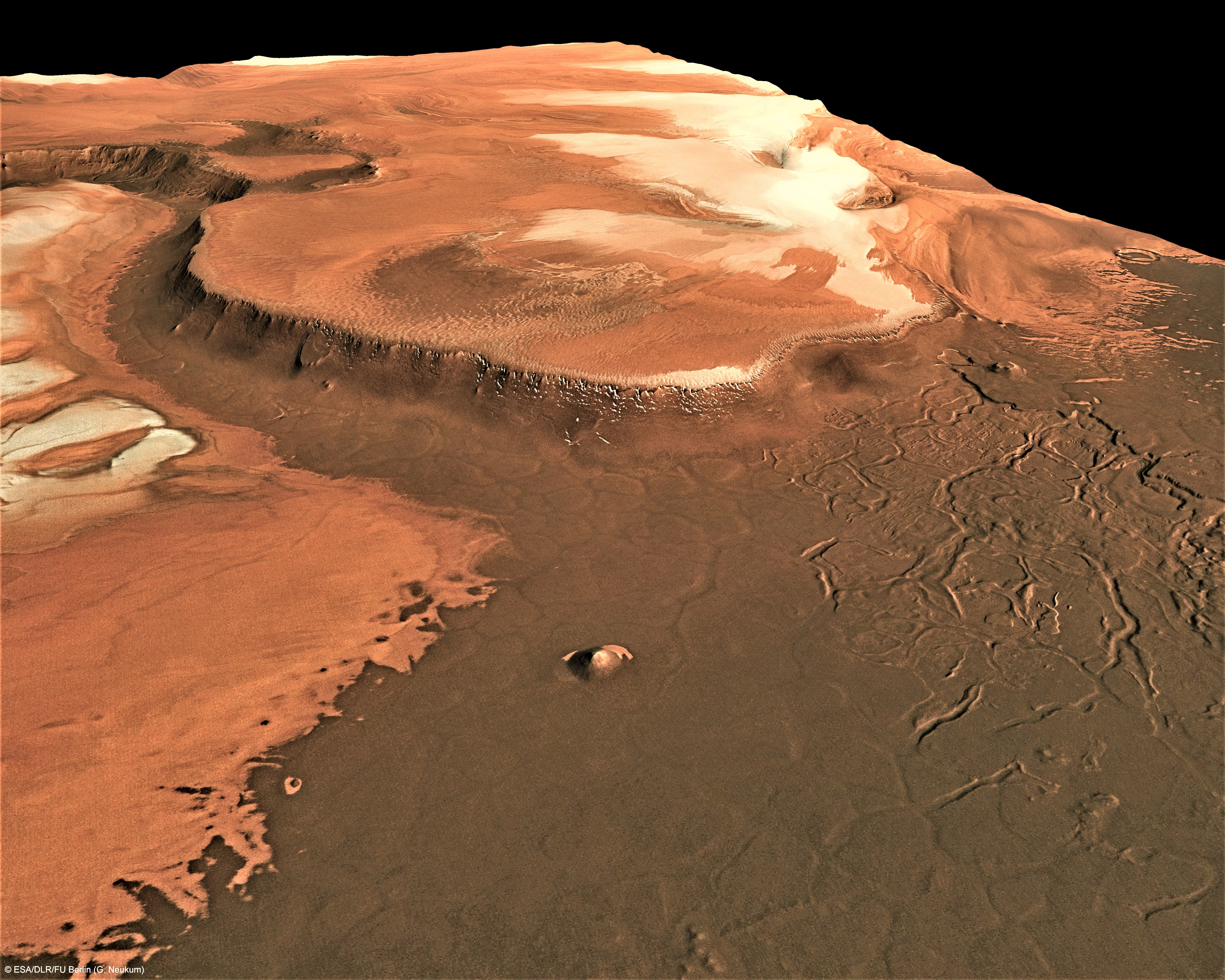
Perspective view of the Martian polar ice cap and Rupes Tenuis with Abalos Mensa on the left of the picture.

- Amenthes Rupes
- Argyre Rupes
- Arimanes Rupes
- Avernus Rupes
- Bosporos Rupes
- Chalcoporos Rupēs
- Claritas Rupes
- Cydnus Rupēs
- Elysium Rupes
- Hephaestus Rupēs
- Hiddekel Rupes
- Icaria Rupes
- Morpheos Rupes
- Nilokeras Scopulus
- Nord Rupes
- Ogygis Rupes
- Olympus Rupes
- Olympia Rupēs
- Panchaia Rupēs
- Phison Rupes
- Phrixi Rupes
- Pityusa Rupes
- Promethei Rupes
- Rupes Tenuis
- Tartarus Rupes
- Thyles Rupes
- Ulyxis Rupes
- Utopia Rupēs

=== Mercury ===
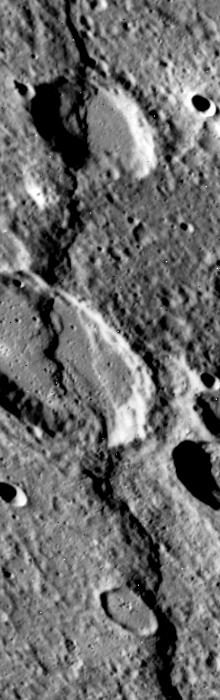
Discovery Rupes

- Acadia Rupes
- Adventure Rupes
- Altair Rupes
- Alvin Rupes
- Antares Rupes
- Arquipelago Rupes
- Astrolabe Rupes
- Beagle Rupes
- Belgica Rupes
- Blossom Rupes
- Calypso Rupes
- Carnegie Rupes
- Challenger Rupes
- Discovery Rupes
- Duyfken Rupes
- Eltanin Rupes
- Endeavour Rupes
- Enterprise Rupes
- Fram Rupes
- Gjöa Rupes
- Heemskerck Rupes
- Hero Rupes
- Kainan Rupes
- La Duaphine Rupes
- Mirni Rupes
- Nautilus Rupes
- Palmer Rupes
- Paramour Rupes
- Pelagia Rupes
- Pourquoi-Pas Rupes
- Resolution Rupes
- Santa María Rupes
- Terror Rupes
- Unity Rupes
- Vejas Rupes
- Victoria Rupes
- Vostok Rupes
- Zapiola Rupes
- Zarya Rupes
- Zeehaen Rupes

=== Venus ===
- Fornax Rupes
- Gabie Rupes
- Hestia Rupes
- Uorsar Rupes
- Ut Rupes
- Vaidilute Rupes
- Vesta Rupes

== Natural satellites ==
=== Moon ===
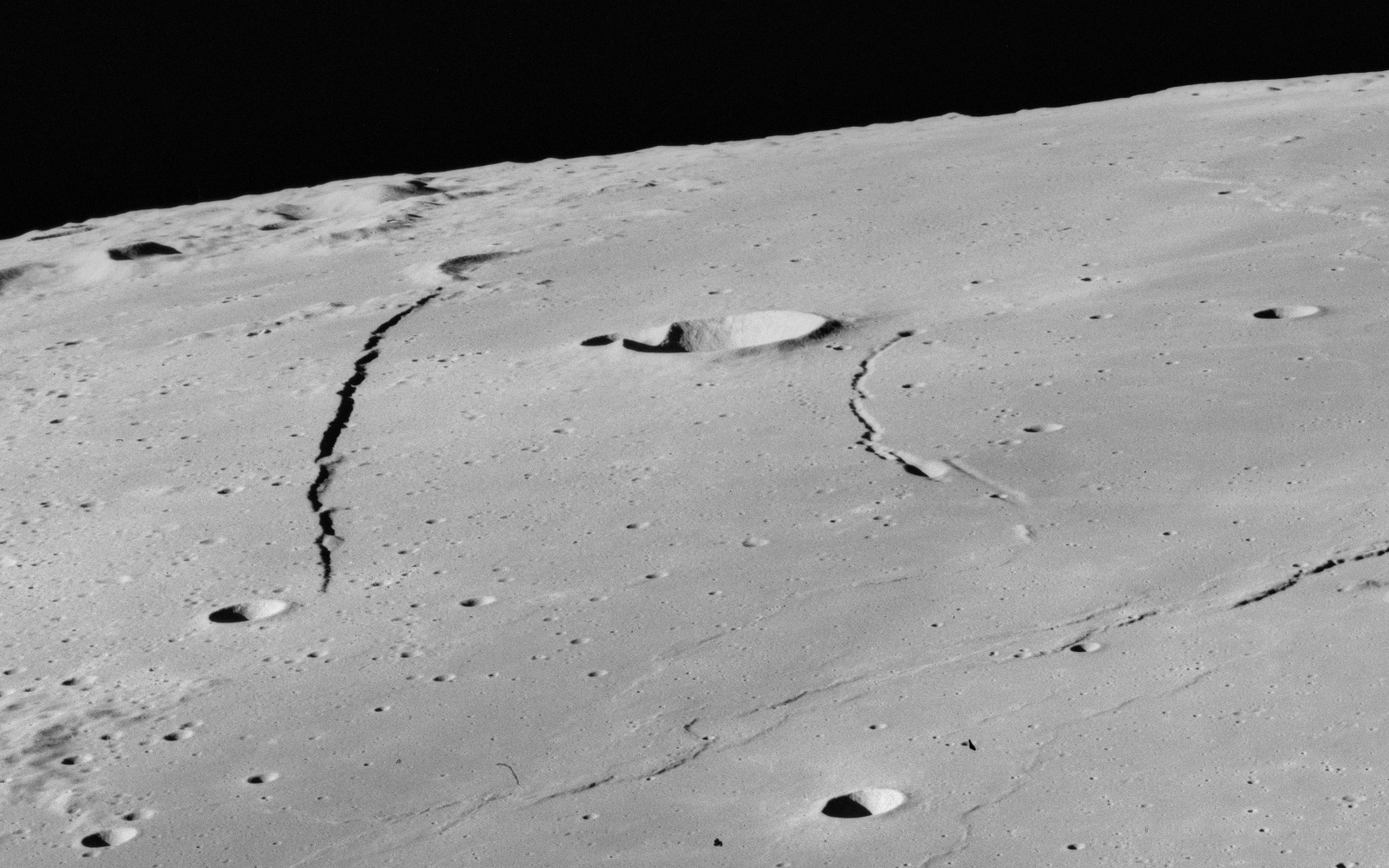
Oblique view of Rupes Recta (left)

- Rupes Altai
- Rupes Boris
- Rupes Cauchy
- Rupes Kelvin
- Rupes Liebig
- Rupes Mercator
- Rupes Recta
- Rupes Toscanelli
- Philolaus escarpment (name only on the Rand McNally moonmap)

=== Miranda ===
- Argier Rupes
- Verona Rupes

=== Titania ===
- Rousillon Rupes

== Asteroids ==
=== Lutetia ===
- Glana Rupes
- Rhenus Rupes

=== Vesta ===
- Agonium Rupes
- Matronalia Rupes
- Parentatio Rupes
