= Chambers Island =

Island in Green Bay, Lake Michigan, U.S.

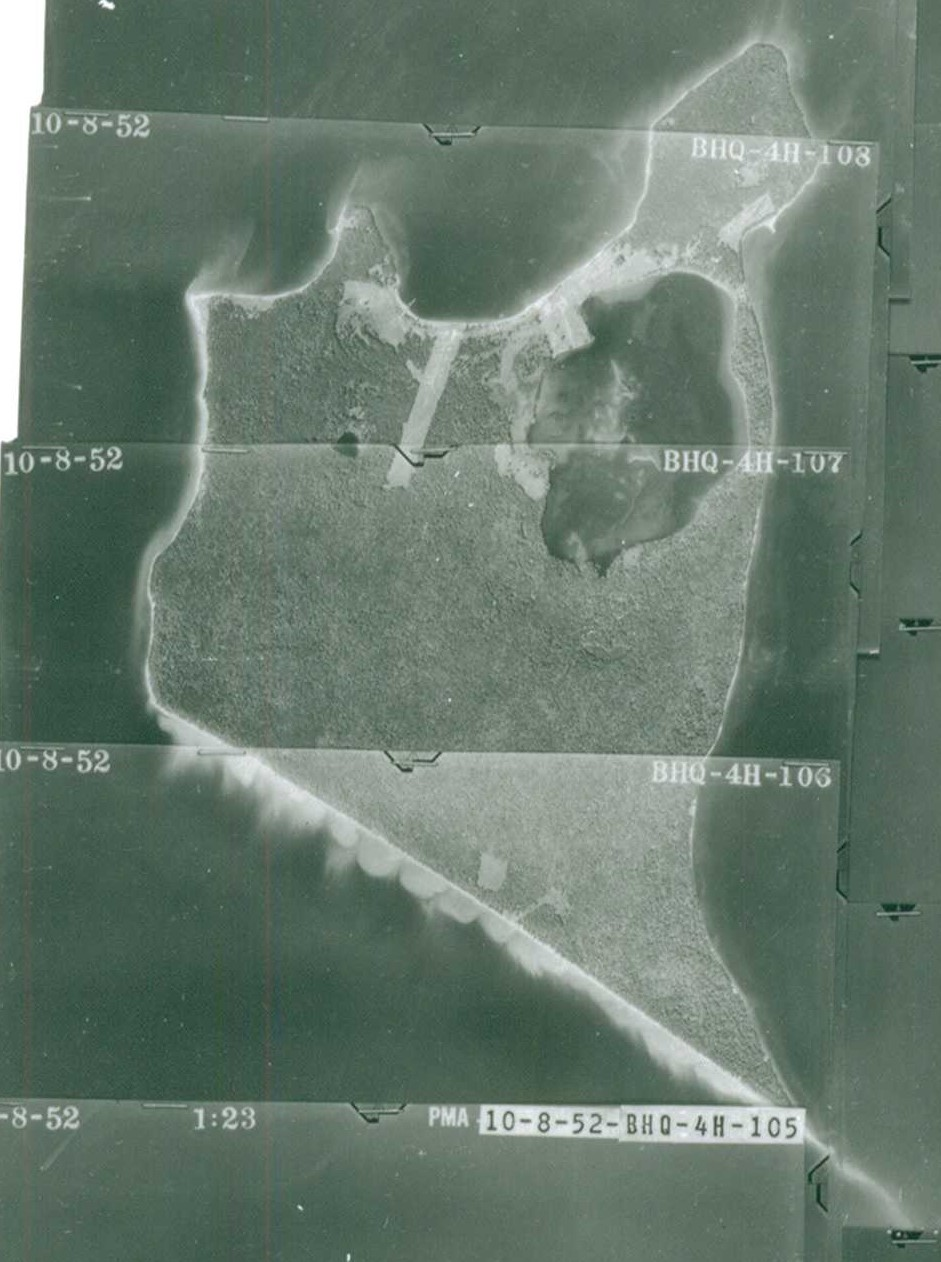
- Chambers Island on October 8, 1952

- Location within Wisconsin
- Etymology: Talbot Chambers

Geography
- Location: Green Bay
- Coordinates: 45°10′56″N 087°21′19″W
- Area: 10.04 km^{2} (3.88 sq mi)land area
- Highest elevation: 600 ft (180 m), 55 ft above lake level (approx)

Administration
- United States
- State: Wisconsin
- County: Door
- Town: Gibraltar

Chambers Island, named in honor of Col. Talbot Chambers, is a 2,834 acre (4.428 sq. mi.) island in Green Bay, about 7 miles (11 km) off the coast of the Door Peninsula, near Gibraltar, Wisconsin. It is part of the Town of Gibraltar in Door County.

A Native American name for the island is Ke-Che Mab-Ne-Do, which means "The Great Spirit", and the lake is known as Mac-Kay-See.

== History ==
Two or three families of European descent lived on the island as early as 1837. The first permanent settler to the island was Stephen A. Hoag who was soon followed by Nathaniel Brooks. The latter declared the island “a perfect paradise” and a settlement arose there in the 1850s. By the 1860s, about 250 people lived on the island. But other frontier communities in Ephraim and Fish Creek lured settlers away. In 1897 Reuben Ridgley, a cook and year-round watchman for a lumber camp, proclaimed his son, Stephen, the first person born on the island. Three years later, the only permanent residents on the island were the government lighthouse keeper and his wife. No permanent population was reported in the 2000 census. In 2001 there were over 40 seasonal homes on the island.

Since 1867, the island has been home to the Chambers Island lighthouse, which has been deactivated since 1961. The lighthouse has been the maintained at the 40-acre (160,000 m^{2}) town park since its commissioning in 1976.

For more than sixty years, through 2013, the Roman Catholic Diocese of Green Bay maintained a seasonal retreat house on Chambers Island, called the Holy Name Retreat House, on a 70-acre former resort property located on the isthmus between Green Bay and Mackaysee Lake on the east shore of the island. The house opened in the middle of 1951 after being gifted to the diocese by George Baudhuin. The retreat house typically attracted thousands of people per year to reflect for several days or a week between the months of May and September. On January 15, 2014, the Diocese announced that it would cease to offer retreats at the property. The diocese cited that 758 retreatants had visited the island in 2013, a number that made maintaining the island unsustainable. Guests were charged $210 to attend a retreat and it cost the diocese $409 per person for transportation, food, and administration. Another concern cited was potential medical emergencies on the isolated island. Over 62,000 people had attended a retreat during the sixty-two years that it operated.

In 1959 the island was used as a training target for a simulated nuclear bombing mission.

== Geography ==
The highest elevation on the island is approximately 55' above the lakeshore. Approximately 1/8 (12.3%) of the island's area is taken up by shallow 348.73-acre (1.4113 km^{2}) Mackaysee Lake, in the northeastern part of the island. There rests a smaller lake to the west of Mackaysee Lake called Krause Lake or Mud Lake. There are two islands in Mackaysee Lake. The islands are classified as third order recursive islands due to being in a lake on an island in a lake. The land area is 10.04 km^{2} (3.8765 sq mi, or 2,481 acres).

The island represents a spur of the Niagara Escarpment rather than part of the Black River or Magnesian escarpments. The topography is flat and similar to that of Marinette County, and bedrock is not exposed anywhere on the island. The soils are sandy-clayey and in general appear to be nutrient-poor and somewhat acidic. The variety of plants on the island are more similar to those Marinette County than to plants on the Door Peninsula. Exceptions to this include the calcicoles Canada buffaloberry and herb-Robert, which grow in deposits of dolomite gravel deposited from the Door Peninsula.

163 species of birds have been recorded on the island.

=== Hanover Shoal ===
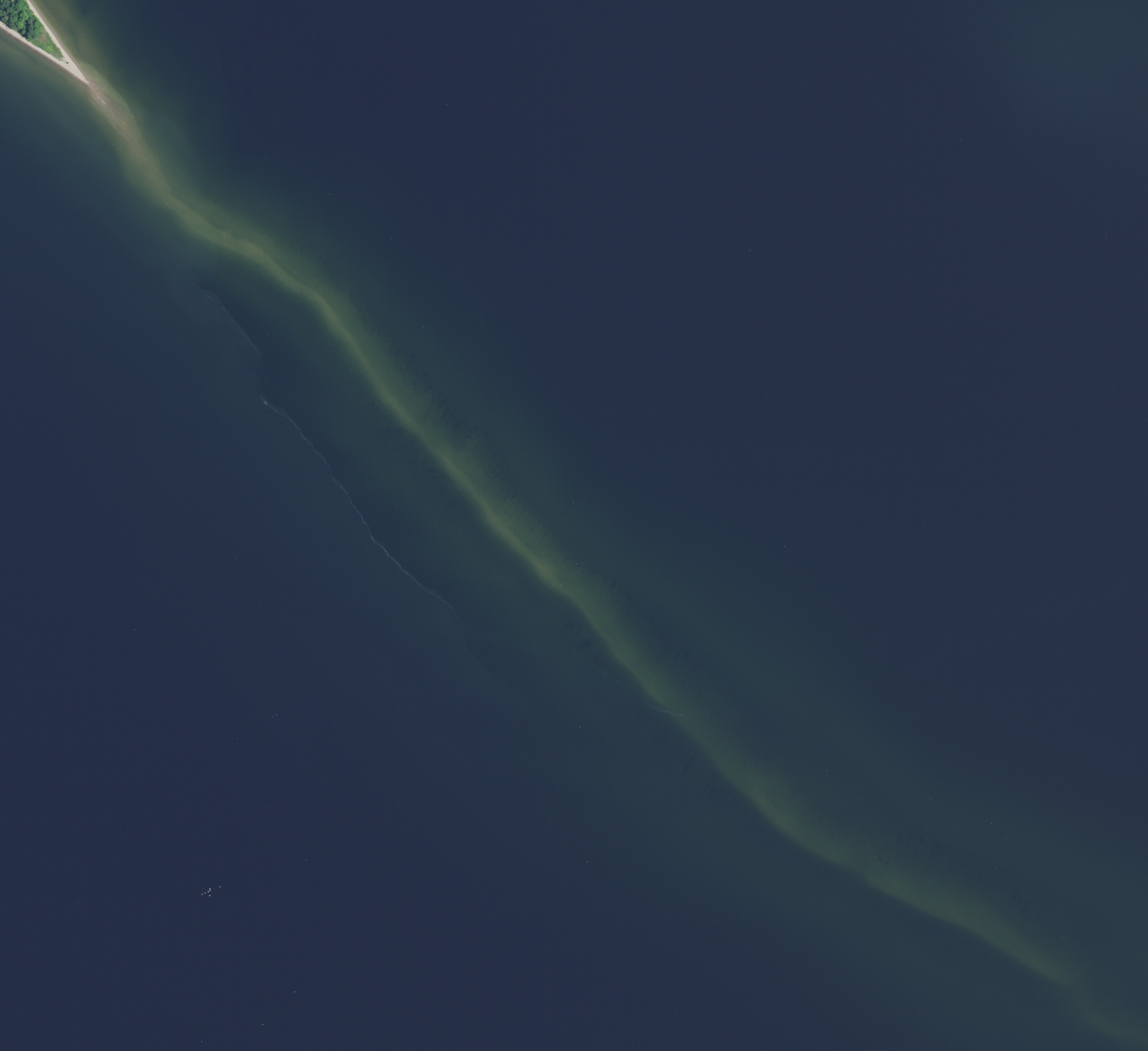
Hanover Shoal on July 27, 2020; the average lake level for July 2020 was 177.45 meters.

In the southeast, Chambers Island narrows to a spit, called Hanover Shoal, which extends toward the shoreline of the Door Peninsula, from which it is approximately 5-mile (8.0 km) distant. The shoal is located at 45.14804°N 87.31705°W and is open to the public as long as they "keep their feet wet". The shoal is named for the 1867 wreck of the schooner Hanover.

=== Climate ===
Chambers Island

Climate chart (precipitation, max. and min. temperature)
J	F	M	A	M	J	J	A	S	O	N	D
63 −8 −11	52 −15 −16	49 −3 −7	97 2 −1	86 7 3	91 14 11	105 18 17	96 17 16	96 17 15	107 10 9	80 8 6	57 4 3
- █ Average max. and min. temperatures in °C
- █ Precipitation totals in mm
Imperial conversion
J	F	M	A	M	J	J	A	S	O	N	D
2.5 18 12	2 5 3	1.9 27 19	3.8 36 30	3.4 45 37	3.6 57 52	4.1 64 63	3.8 63 61	3.8 63 59	4.2 50 48	3.1 46 43	2.2 39 37
- █ Average max. and min. temperatures in °F
- █ Precipitation totals in inches

== Public and private areas ==
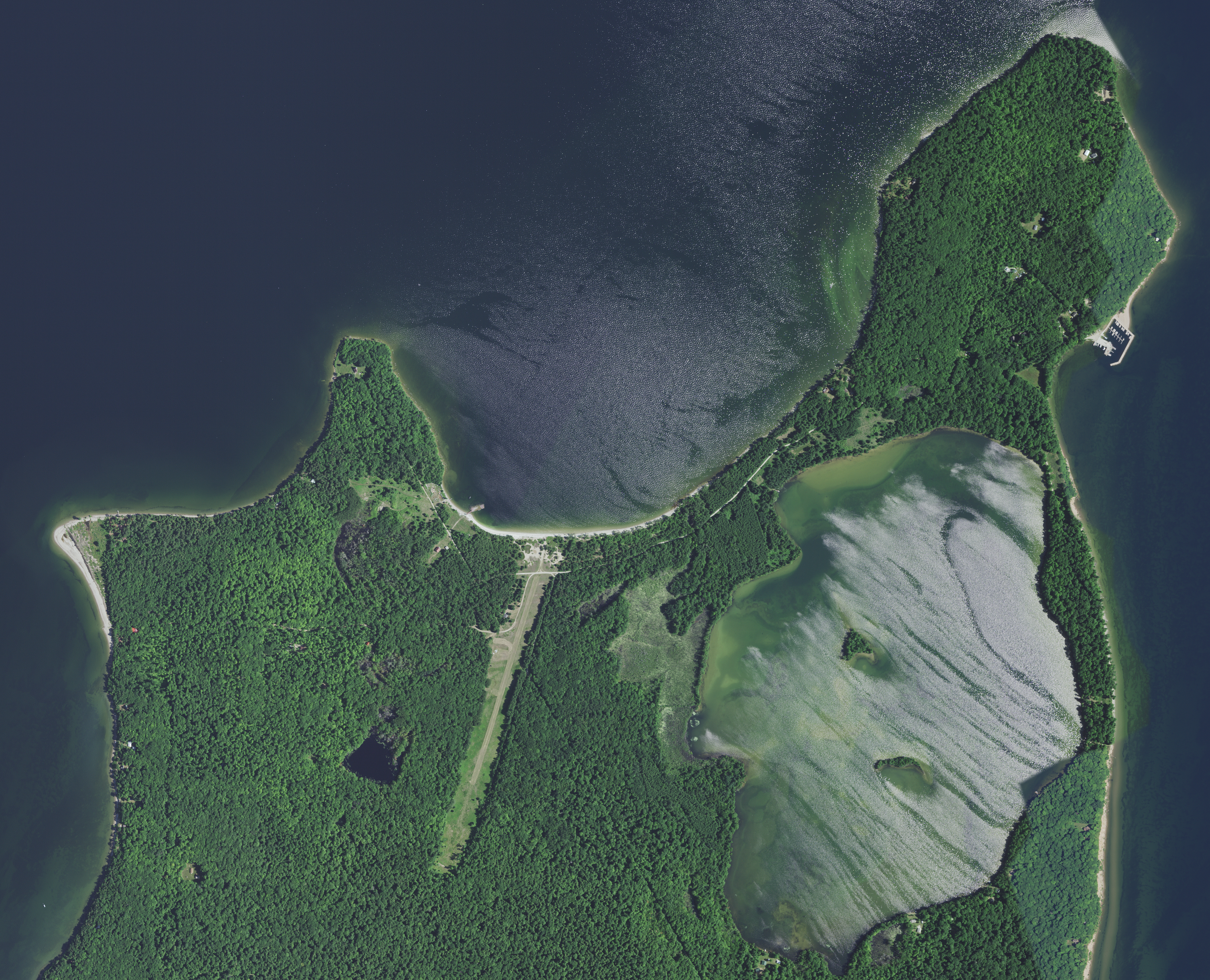
The public dock is at the far right and closer to the top

Chambers Island's exterior shoreline is mostly privately owned with the exception of the Gibraltar town park where the lighthouse is located. On the southeast side of the island, the right-of-way of Base Line Road reaches the Green Bay shoreline. In addition, four privately owned exterior shoreline areas are open to public access: The public slip, in the marina, is located a mile and a half in walking distance from the lighthouse. It is owned by the Chambers Island Marina Company LLC, which purchased the marina from the Roman Catholic Diocese of Green Bay. The only public access in the marina is a designated transient slip located in the original section of the marina. In addition, a parcel near the marina is owned by the Door County Land Trust and two segments of the north and south exterior shorelines of the island are located on parcels enrolled for public access under the Wisconsin Managed Forest program. Chambers Island has numerous private residences located near the external shoreline of the island on parcels allowing no public access.

Three areas of interior shoreline along the north, west, and south of Mackaysee Lake are part of the Chambers Island Nature Preserve owned by the Door County Land Trust and are also enrolled in the Wisconsin Managed Forest program allowing public access. Although the interior shoreline along Krause Lake (also called Mud Lake) is entirely privately owned, one parcel on the northeast shore of the lake is enrolled in the Wisconsin Managed Forest program to allow public access, which includes access to the lake.

888.836 acres (35.8% of the total land area) on the island was enrolled for public access under the Wisconsin Managed Forest Program as of 2021. Additionally, the Chambers Island Lighthouse Park, a public dock, and two dirt roads are open to the public. The remaining portion of the island is privately owned by a number of different persons and corporations and is closed to trespassers.

In Wisconsin, the Public Trust Doctrine holds navigable waters for public use, including shoreline access up to the ordinary high-water mark.

== Services ==
Chambers Island Airport is located on the island. It is a private use airport owned by Chambers Island Flying Corp. with a single 1,200 by 40 feet (366 by 12 m) gravel runway. It was originally constructed as part of an attempt in the 1920s to turn much of the island into a golf course and upscale residential area. This project failed following bad economic times beginning in the fall of 1929. Lots which were originally advertised for up to $15,000 were sold for as little as $22.50 to satisfy tax claims.

Electricity is not commercially available on the island, it is provided by individual generators or solar / wind power. Cellular telephone service is provided to the island and the Door County coastline by Cellcom which has a tower on the island. In 2012 the company installed a wind turbine to augment the solar panels that charge the batteries that power the site.

== Gallery ==
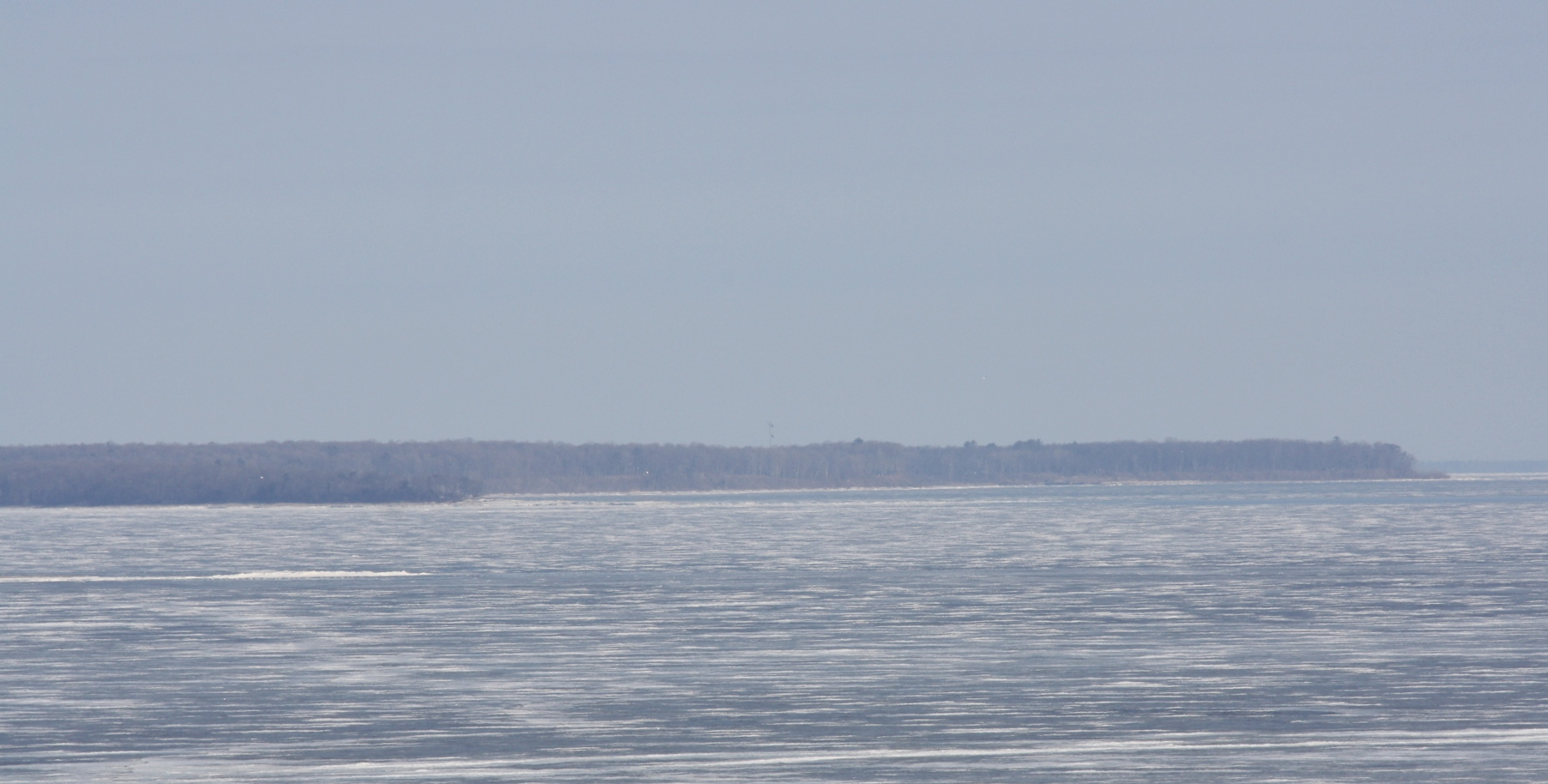
Chambers Island across frozen Green Bay

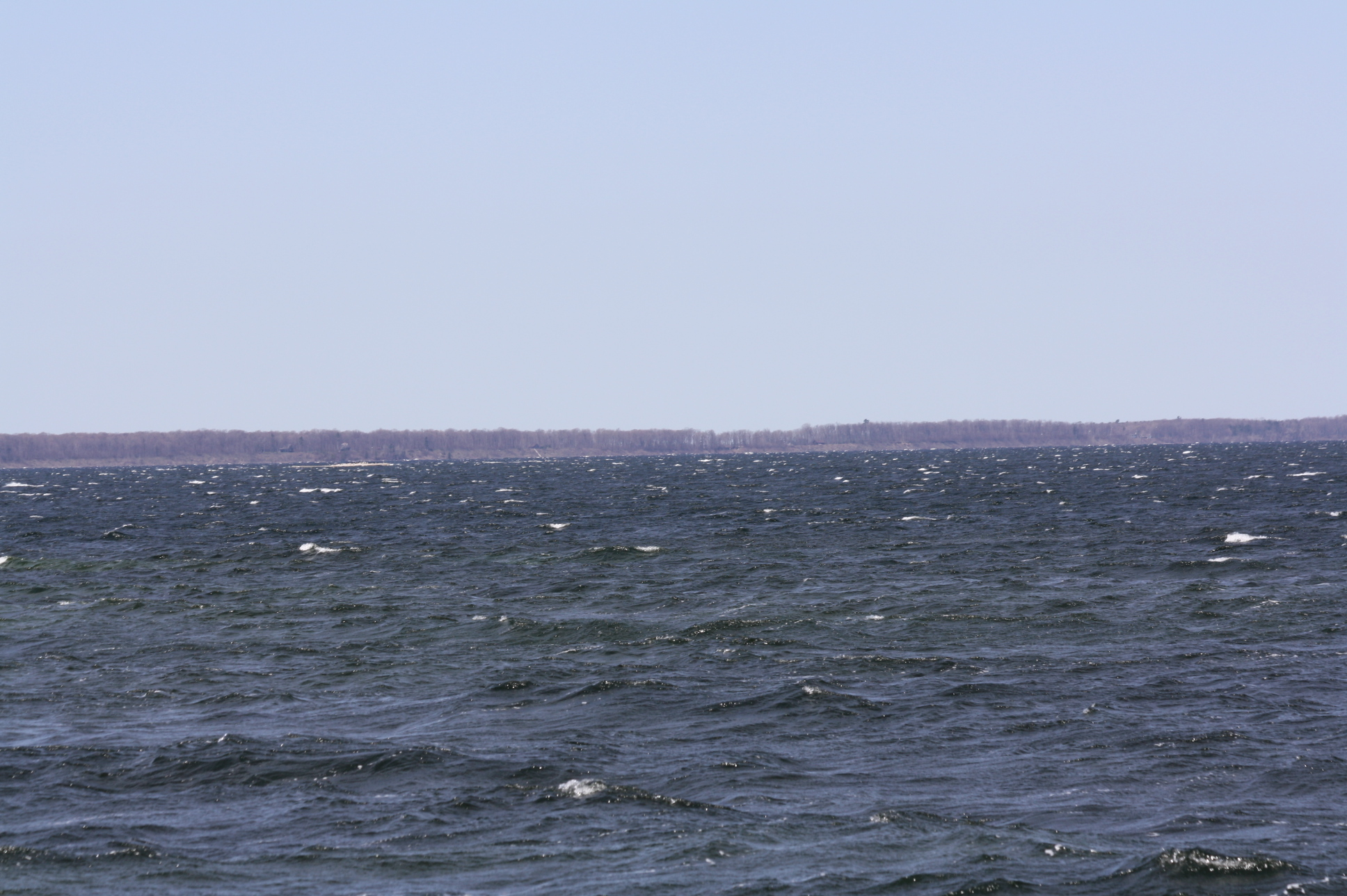
Chambers Island from Fish Creek

The southern and central areas of the island

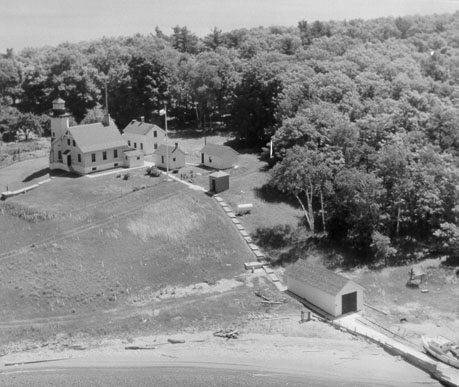
Chambers Island and lighthouse

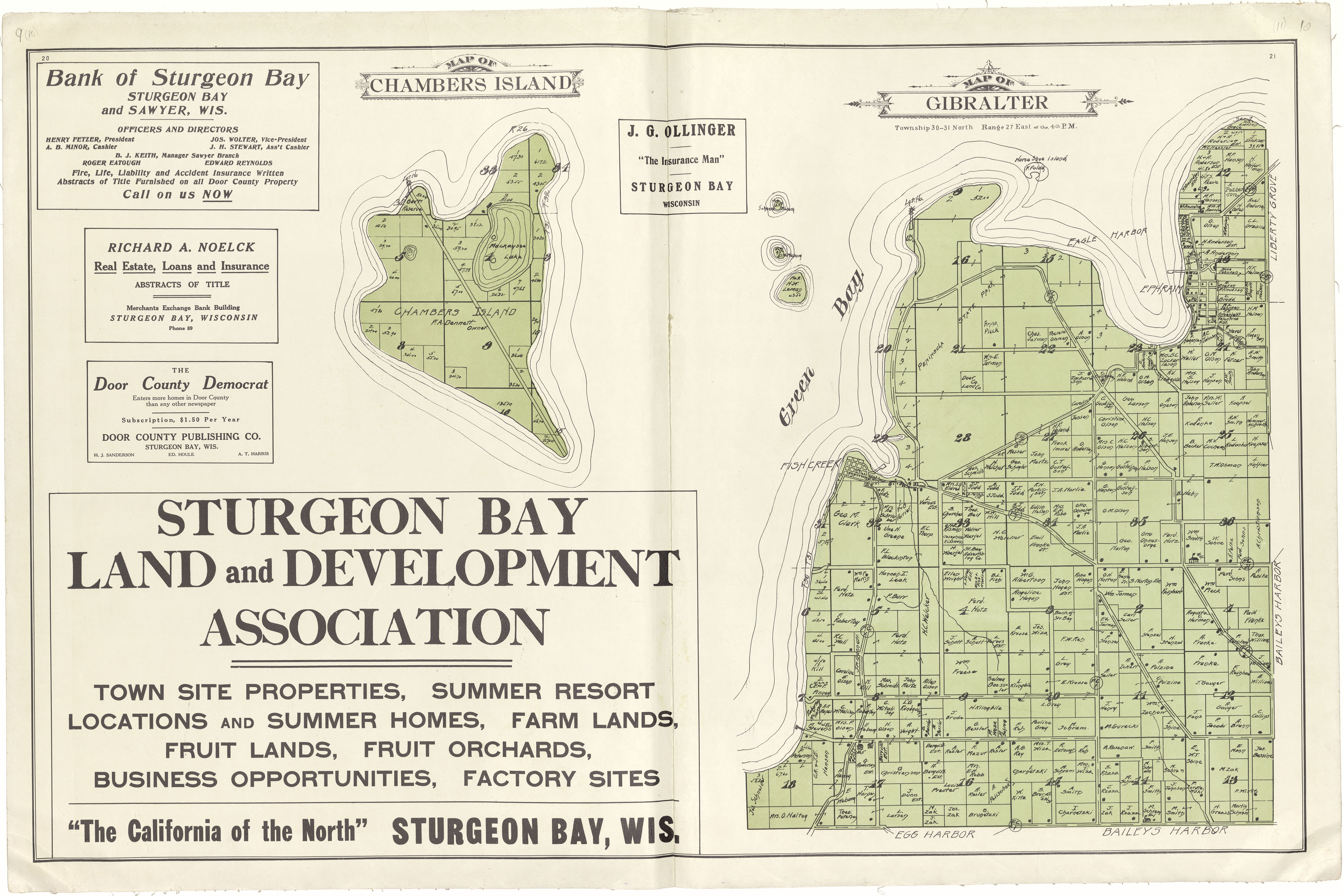
Map of northeastern coast of the Door peninsula with Chambers Island on the left.
