= Great Escarpment (disambiguation) =

A Great Escarpment is a major escarpment that typically runs parallel to the coast of a continent. It may refer to:

- Great Escarpment, Australia
- Great Escarpment, Brazil
- Great Escarpment of India
- Great Escarpment, Southern Africa
