= Schendylops coscaroni =

Scientific classification
- Kingdom: Animalia
- Phylum: Arthropoda
- Subphylum: Myriapoda
- Class: Chilopoda
- Order: Geophilomorpha
- Family: Schendylidae
- Genus: Schendylops
- Species: S. coscaroni

Binomial name
- Schendylops coscaroni (Pereira & Minelli, 1996)

Synonyms
- Schendylurus coscaroni Pereira & Minelli, 1996

Species of centipede

Schendylops coscaroni is a species of soil centipede in the family Schendylidae. This centipede is notable for the sexual dimorphism exhibited in the morphology of the antennae. These sexually dimorphic antennae are unusual among soil centipedes. This species can reach 36 mm in length and features 49 pairs of legs in the male and 51 leg pairs in the female. This centipede is found in the Atlantic Forest in southeastern Brazil.

== Discovery and distribution ==
This species was first described in 1996 by the Argentine myriapodologist Luis Alberto Pereira and the Italian biologist Alessandro Minelli. They based the original description of this species on a female holotype and a male allotype, both collected by Pereira in 1986. He found these specimens in the Serra de Paranapiacaba region of the Serra do Mar mountains in the state of São Paulo in Brazil. The type specimens are deposited in the Museo de La Plata in Argentina. The species name honors the Argentine zoologist Sixto Coscarón of the Museo de La Plata, who encouraged Pereira to study soil centipedes. This centipede is known only from the type locality.

== Taxonomy ==
Pereira and Minelli originally described this species in 1996 under the name Schendylurus coscaroni. In 1997, Pereira and the American zoologist Richard L. Hoffman moved this species to the genus Schendylops when they deemed Schendylurus to be a junior synonym for Schendylops. Accordingly, authorities now accept Schendylops coscaroni as the valid name for this species.

== Description ==
This centipede is a bright reddish brown, with the head, forcipular segment, and the first six leg-bearing segments a darker shade. The female holotype features 51 pairs of legs and measures 28 mm in length and 1.2 mm in width, whereas the male allotype features 49 leg pairs and measures 36 mm in length and 1.3 mm in width. The dorsal plate on the head (cephalic plate) is slightly longer than wide, with a length/width ratio of 1.1.

In both sexes, each antenna is about 3.2 times as long as the cephalic plate, and all articles except the first in each antenna are longer than wide. The antennae of the male, however, are wider and more densely covered with setae than those of the female. In both sexes, the second, fifth, ninth, and thirteenth articles of each antenna features small specialized setae on a smooth hyaline area that is conspicuously lacking in pigment.

The clypeus features a pair of setae behind the antennae but in front of 17 median setae, which are followed by a pair of setae in front of the labrum. The labrum bears 16 blunt teeth in the middle part and five or six pointed teeth on each side piece. Each mandible features a pectinate lamella (comb blade) with about 25 to 28 hyaline teeth and a dentate lamella with 13 teeth divided into three blocks, with three teeth in each of the last two blocks. Lappets project from not only the telopodites but also the coxosternite of the first maxillae. The coxosternite of the first maxillae features two pairs of setae but no groove down the middle. The dorsal edge of the claw at the distal end of each of the second maxillae features a comb with about 25 or 26 teeth, whereas the comb on the ventral edge features about 24 or 25 teeth. When closed, the forcipules do not reach beyond the front of the head, and each article of the forcipules lacks teeth.

The sternites feature fields of pores in an uninterrupted series from the first to the penultimate leg-bearing segment. The pore fields in adults are undivided on the anterior and posterior sternites but divided into two roughly symmetrical areas in the intermediate sternites. Some sternites feature a few isolated pores on each side of the front of the main pore area. The last leg-bearing segment features pleurites next to the pretergite (the sclerite in front of the main tergite).

The basal element of each of the ultimate legs (coxopleuron) features two pores hidden under the adjacent sternite. Each of the ultimate legs features seven articles with a tiny tubercle and a small spine instead of a claw at the distal end. The more proximal articles of each of the ultimate legs are wider than the more distal articles. For example, the penultimate article of each of the ultimate legs of the female is about twice as wide as the terminal article of the same leg.

This species exhibits traits that characterize the genus Schendylops. For example, as in other species of Schendylops, the claw on each of the second maxillae features both a dorsal comb and a ventral comb, and the sternites of at least some leg-bearing segments feature pore fields. Furthermore, as in other species of Schendylops, each of the ultimate legs features two pores on the coxopleuron and seven articles but no claw.

This species shares a distinctive set of traits with another Brazilian species in the same genus, S. inqulinus. For example, both of these species feature an uninterrupted series of pore fields from the first to the penultimate leg-bearing segment with fields that are undivided on the anterior and posterior sternites but divided in the middle of the body. Furthermore, both species feature some sternites with additional pores next to the main pore field, a coxosternite of the first maxillae with two pairs of setae but no groove down the middle, forcipules without any teeth on the most distal article, pleurites next to the pretergite of the last leg-bearing segment, and antennae with specialized sensilla on the second, fifth, ninth, and thirteenth articles.

These two species can be distinguished, however, based on other traits. For example, the sternal glands are pale yellow in S. coscaroni but purple in S. inquilinus, the clypeus features about 17 pairs of median setae in S. coscaroni but only about 10 pairs of median setae in S. inquilinus, and each edge of the claws of the second maxillae bears about 25 teeth in S. coscaroni but only about 17 teeth in S. inquilinus. Furthermore, the penultimate article of each the ultimate legs in the female is about twice as wide as the terminal article of the same leg in S. coscaroni but only about 1.4 times as wide as the terminal article of the same leg in S. inquilinus. Moroever, each sex in S. inquilinus features more leg pairs (51 or 53 in males and 53 or 55 in females) than recorded in S. coscaroni.
