= Drought in Northeastern Brazil =

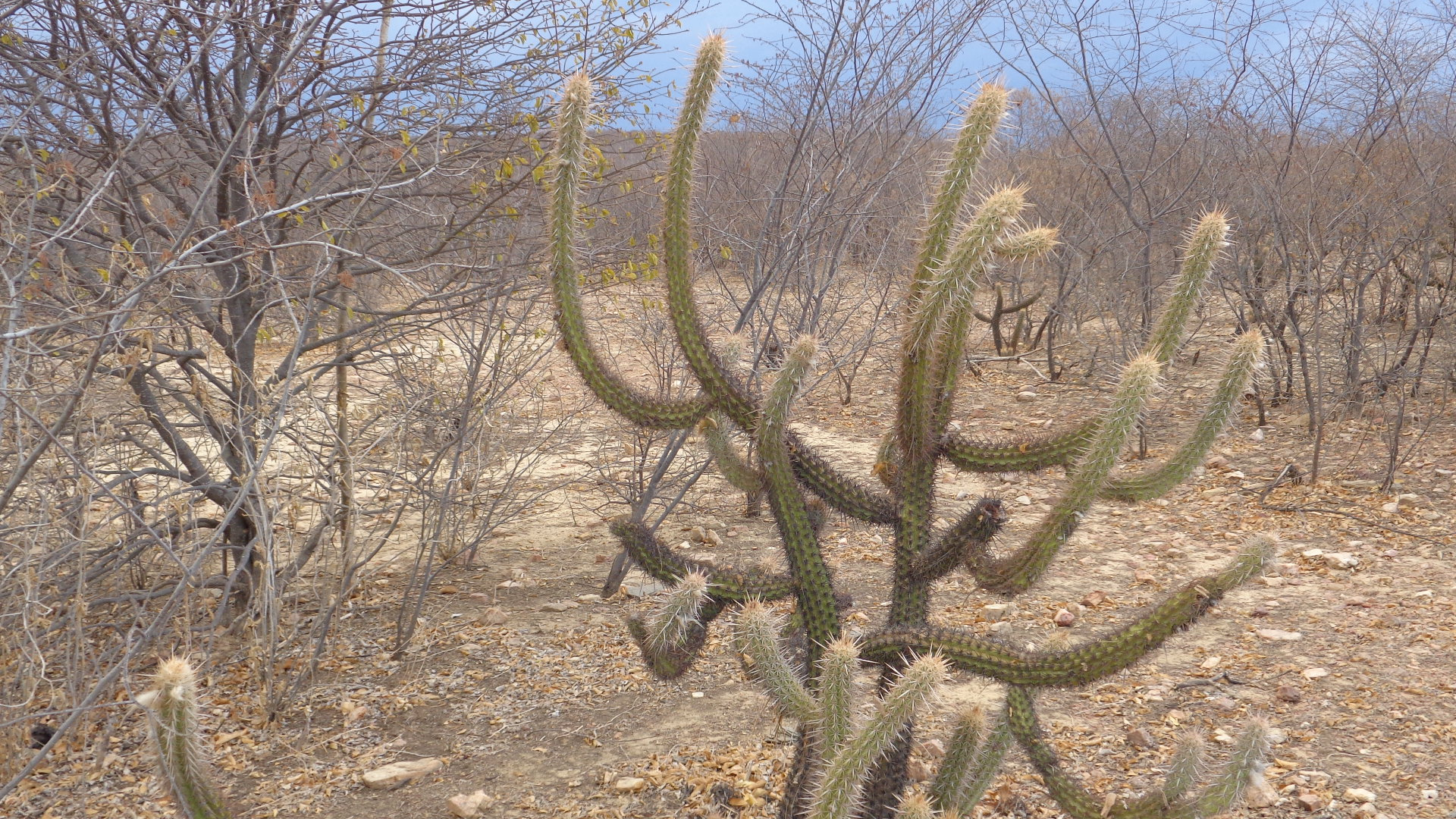
Caatinga during drought season in Northeastern Brazil.

Drought in the Northeast region of Brazil is a natural phenomenon resulting from lack of rain in the NE region of Brazil, which has high temperatures with low rainfall during the year. The escarpment acts as an obstruction to the winds blowing from the sea and cause orographic type of rainfall in the coastal region. Beyond the highlands, the effect of these winds get reduced. As a result, the rainfall is minimal. This region is a rain shadow region. Hence, it is also called as Drought Quadrilateral. This region extends from northern Bahia to coast between Natal and Sao Luis; that zone receives about 15-30 inches (375-750mm) of precipitation a year.

== See also ==
- Climate in Brazil
