= Cape Hotham Escarpment =

Coordinates: 74°52′N 93°27′W

The Cape Hotham Escarpment is an escarpment on the southeastern side of Cornwallis Island in Nunavut, Canada. It extends from Cape Hotham in the south to the mouth of an unnamed stream north of Depot Point. The northern end of the escarpment is just east of the southern end of Weldy Phipps Ridge.

== See also ==
- List of escarpments
