= Mackaysee Lake =

Lake in Wisconsin, United States

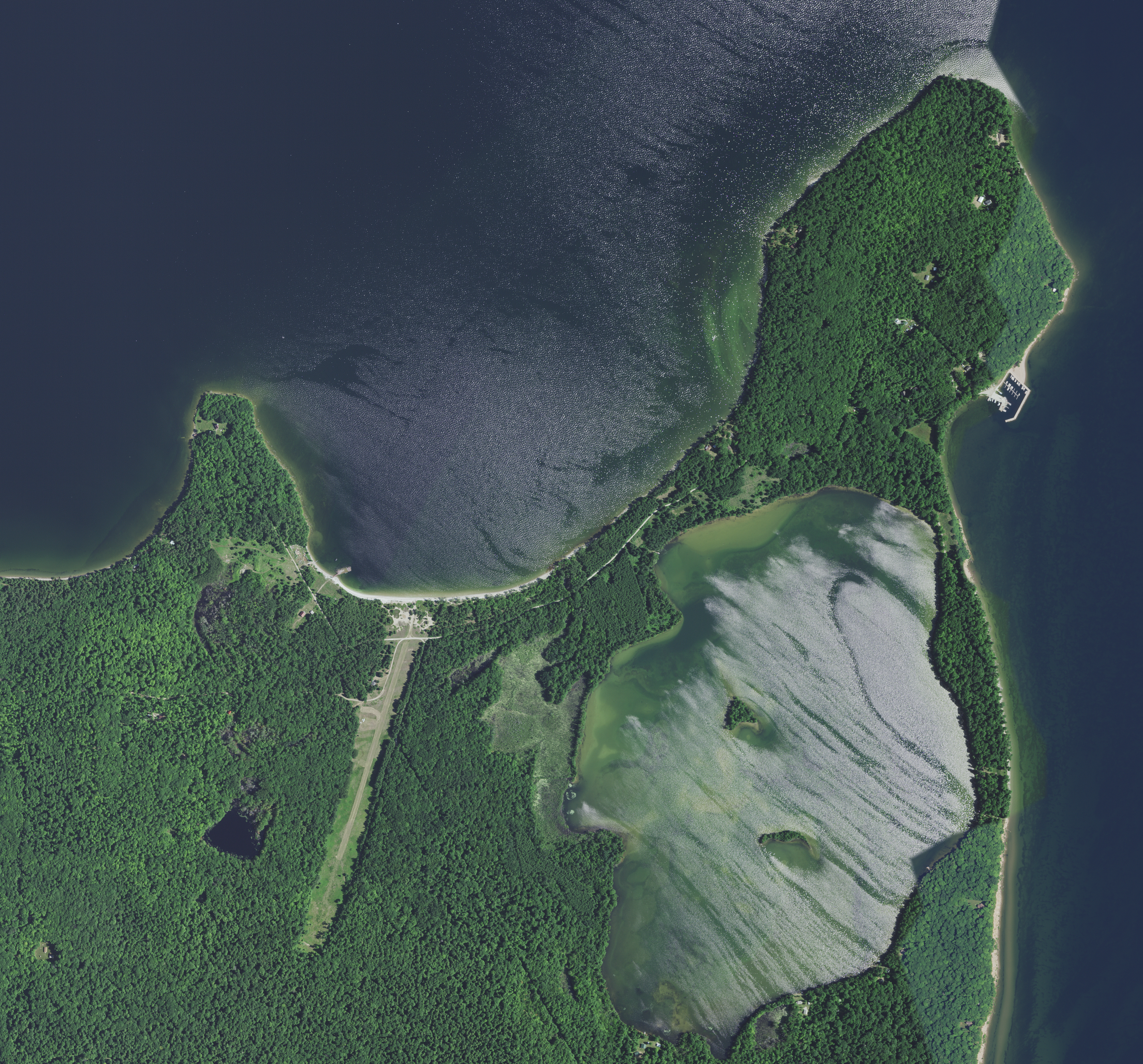
- Mackaysee Lake (right) is the larger of the two lakes in northern Chambers Island.

- Location within Wisconsin Location within the United States
- "Mackaysee Lake". Geographic Names Information System. United States Geological Survey, United States Department of the Interior.
- Location: Door County, Wisconsin
- Coordinates: 45.1932121°N 87.3437519°W
- Basin countries: United States
- Surface area: 347 acres (0.542 sq mi; 1.40 km^{2})
- Average depth: 6 ft (1.8 m)
- Max. depth: 27 ft (8.2 m)
- Water volume: 2,217.2 acre⋅ft (2,734,900 m^{3})
- Shore length^{1}: 3.61 mi (5.81 km)
- Surface elevation: 584 feet (178 m)
- Islands: two unnamed
- ^{1} Shore length is not a well-defined measure.

Mackaysee Lake is a lake located in Door County, Wisconsin. The lake is found on Chambers Island in Green Bay of Lake Michigan. Mackaysee Lake has a surface area of 347 acres (1.40 km^{2}) and a max depth of 27 ft (8.2 m). Most of the lake has a sand bottom and is shallow with an average depth of 6 ft (1.8 m). There are two islands in Mackaysee Lake. Both are owned by the Door County Land Trust and are protected in the Chambers Island Nature Preserve. The islands are classified as third order recursive islands due to being in a lake on an island in a lake.

Three areas of shoreline along the north, west, and south of Mackaysee Lake are owned by the Door County Land Trust and are also enrolled in the Wisconsin Managed Forest program allowing public access.

== Climate ==
Mackaysee Lake

Climate chart (precipitation, max. and min. temperature)
| J | F | M | A | M | J | J | A | S | O | N | D |
| 63 −7 −13 | 52 −13 −18 | 49 0 −6 | 97 5 0 | 86 10 4 | 91 17 11 | 105 19 17 | 96 18 16 | 96 17 14 | 107 9 6 | 80 9 3 | 57 4 −1 |
- █ Average max. and min. temperatures in °C
- █ Precipitation totals in mm
Imperial conversion
| J | F | M | A | M | J | J | A | S | O | N | D |
| 2.5 19 9 | 2 9 0 | 1.9 32 21 | 3.8 41 32 | 3.4 50 39 | 3.6 63 52 | 4.1 66 63 | 3.8 64 61 | 3.8 63 57 | 4.2 48 43 | 3.1 48 37 | 2.2 39 30 |
- █ Average max. and min. temperatures in °F
- █ Precipitation totals in inches

== See also ==
- List of lakes of Wisconsin § Door County
