= Missouri Escarpment =

Ridge in North Dakota

The Missouri Escarpment is a ridge in North Dakota approximately 100 miles to the west of the Red River Valley, at the edge of the Missouri Plateau. It divides the Central Lowlands province from the Great Plains province.

== See also ==
- List of escarpments
