= Resolution Rupes =

Rupes on Mercury

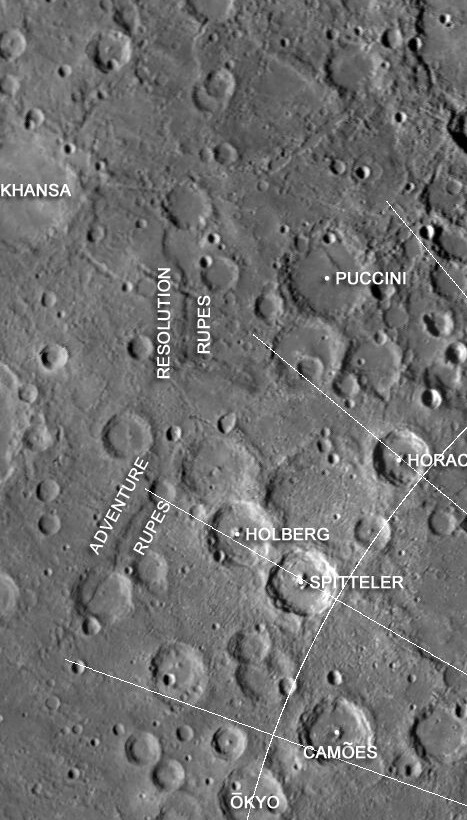
- Feature type: Rupes
- Coordinates: 63.24°S 50.66°W
- Length: 190 km
- Eponym: HMS Resolution

Resolution Rupes is an escarpment on Mercury approximately 190 kilometers long located in the southern hemisphere of Mercury. Discovered by the Mariner 10 spacecraft in 1974, it was formed by a thrust fault, thought to have occurred due to the shrinkage of the planet's core as it cooled over time.

Resolution Rupes has an arcuate shape with the scarp face on convex side of the arc. It has a relief of about 0.9 km and is situated between Adventure Rupes and Discovery Rupes. These three scarps lie on a large arc extending for more than 1000 km. Resolution Rupes is separated from Adventure Rupes by a high relief ridge informally called Rabelais Dorsum, which crosscuts the scarps. This means that Resolution Rupes and Adventure Rupes may be parts of one large structure similar in length to Discovery Rupes.

The scarp is named after HMS Resolution, one of James Cook's ships on his second voyage to the Pacific, 1772–1775. The name was adopted by the International Astronomical Union in 1976.

== See also ==
- List of escarpments
