= Chambers Island Light =

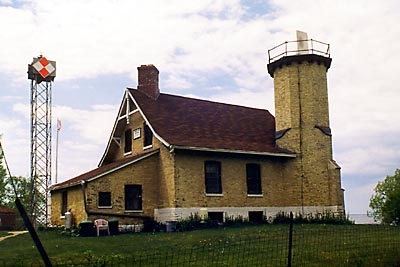
- Location: Chambers Island, Wisconsin
- Coordinates: 45°12′09″N 87°21′53″W

Tower
- Constructed: 1868
- Foundation: Concrete
- Construction: Brick
- Automated: 1961
- Height: 67 feet (20 m)
- Shape: Octagonal without lantern
- Heritage: National Register of Historic Places listed place

Light
- First lit: 1868
- Deactivated: 1961
- Focal height: 30 m (98 ft)
- Range: 10 nmi (19 km; 12 mi)
- Characteristic: Fl W 6s
- Chambers Island Lighthouse
- U.S. National Register of Historic Places
- Area: 40 acres (16 ha)
- Built: 1868
- NRHP reference No.: 75000063
- Added to NRHP: August 19, 1975

The Chambers Island lighthouse is a lighthouse located on Chambers Island in Door County, Wisconsin. It was replaced in 1961 by a skeletal tower, visible for 12 nautical miles (22 km; 14 mi). The new light is identified by the USCG as 7-21895.

It was added to the National Register of Historic Places in 1975 as reference #75000063.

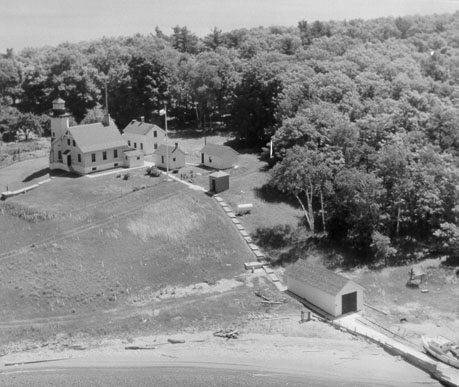
USCG archive photo

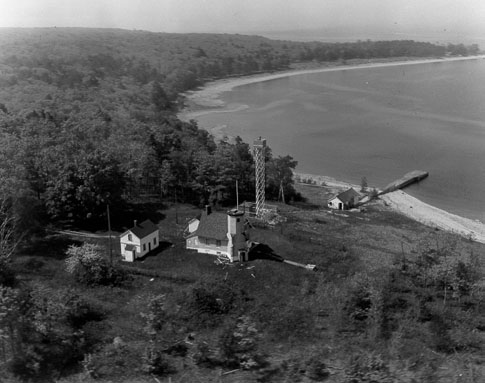
USCG archive – no lantern
