= Adventure Rupes =

Rupes on Mercury

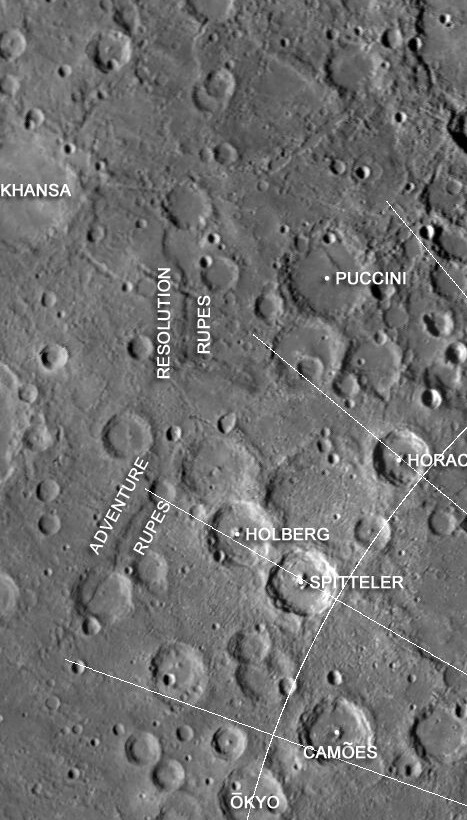
- Feature type: Rupes
- Coordinates: 65.48°S 65.30°W
- Length: 270 km
- Eponym: HMS Adventure

Adventure Rupes is an escarpment on Mercury approximately 270 kilometres (170 miles) long located in the southern hemisphere of Mercury. Discovered by the Mariner 10 spacecraft in 1974, it was formed by a thrust fault, thought to have occurred due to the shrinkage of the planet's core as it cooled over time.

Adventure Rupes has an arcuate shape with the scarp face on the convex side of the arc. It has a relief of about 1.3 km and is a continuation of Resolution Rupes and Discovery Rupes along a rough arc, which extends for more than 1000 km. Adventure Rupes is separated from Resolution Rupes by a high relief ridge informally named Rabelais Dorsum, which crosscuts the scarps. This means that Resolution Rupes and Adventure Rupes may be parts of one large structure similar in length to Discovery Rupes.

The scarp is named after HMS Adventure, one of James Cook's ships on his second voyage to the Pacific, 1772–1775. The name was adopted by the International Astronomical Union in 1976.

== See also ==
- List of escarpments
