= Santa María Rupes =

Rupes on Mercury

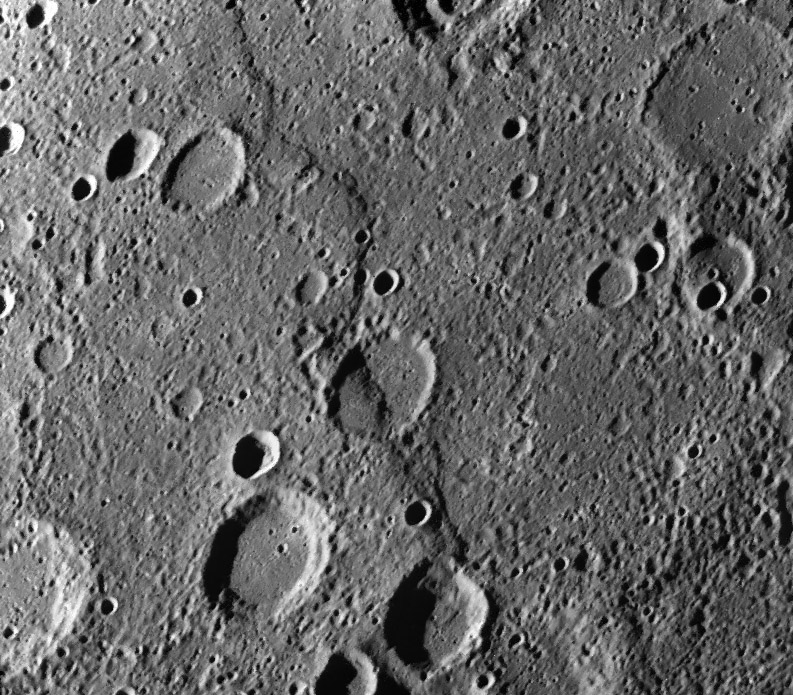
- Santa Maria Rupes, as photographed by Mariner 10
- Feature type: Rupes
- Coordinates: 5.82°N 19.83°W
- Eponym: Santa María

Santa María Rupes is a prominent lobate escarpment and fault line on Mercury. According to data from Arecibo, it has a relief of roughly 700 m. The formation was named after the ship Santa María, used by Christopher Columbus. The escarpment was probably created as Mercury cooled and thus contracted.

== See also ==
- List of escarpments
