= Rupes Toscanelli =

Ridge on the surface of the Moon

- Feature type: Rupes
- Coordinates: 26.97°S 47.53°W

The Rupes Toscanelli is an escarpment located on the Moon. The cliff is named after the nearby Toscanelli crater, which in turn was named after the Italian mathematician and astronomer Paolo dal Pozzo Toscanelli.
