= Black River Escarpment (Wisconsin) =

Coordinates: 43°45′57″N 88°58′24″W

The Black River Escarpment is a geological feature in Eastern Wisconsin. The escarpment runs parallel to and between the Niagara Escarpment and the Magnesian Escarpment. The escarpment marks the boundary between bedrock from Lower Magnesian limestone bedrock and earlier Black River limestone. The escarpment emerges from Green Bay, on Lake Michigan. The escarpment's boundaries are not always visible to the untrained eye, but are marked by cliffs in some regions.

== See also ==
- List of escarpments
