= Great Escarpment, Australia =

Geographic feature in Australia

The Great Escarpment
- Escarpment
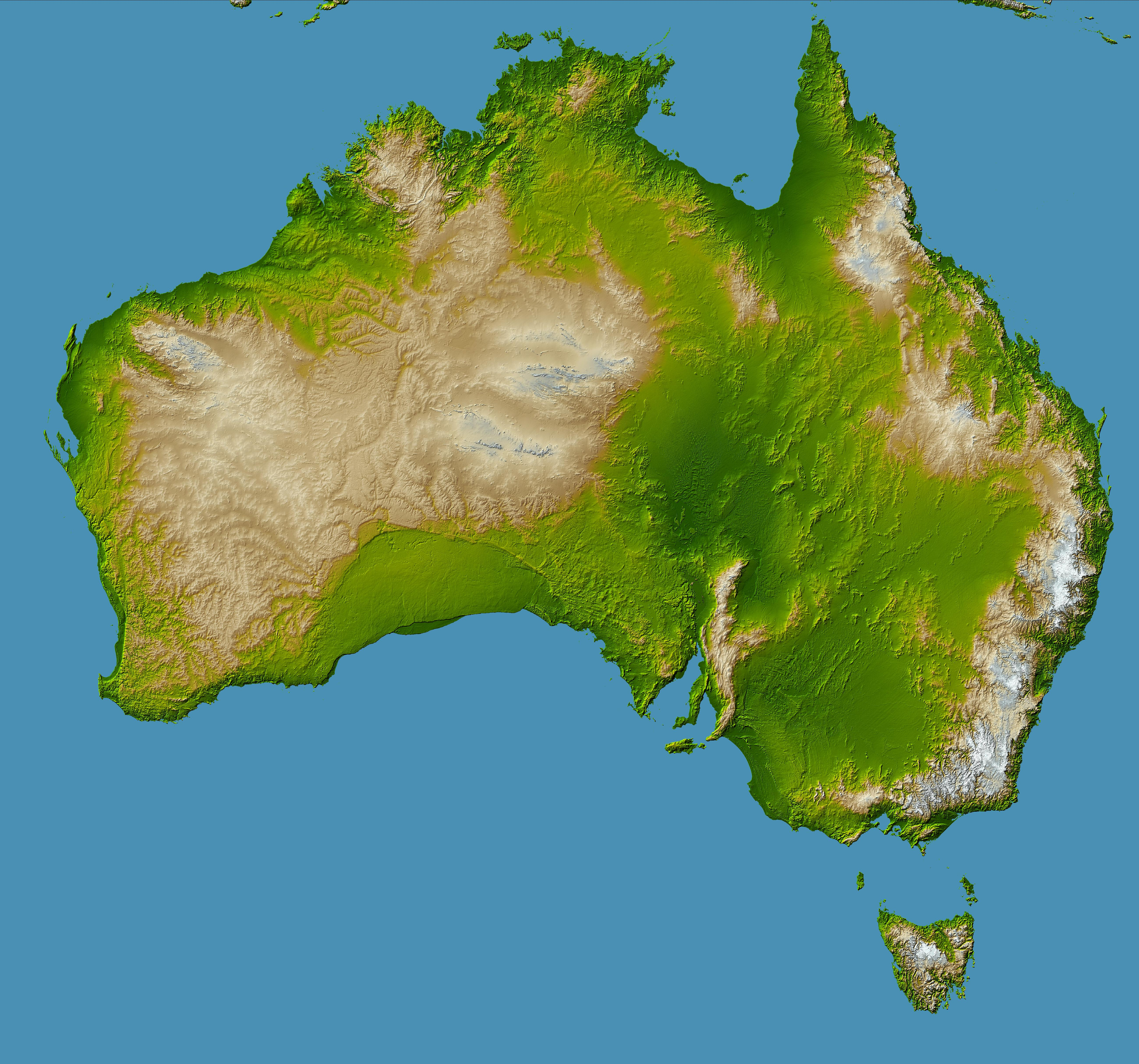
- The topography of Australia with The Great Escarpment to the east of the Great Dividing Range that is coloured in white on the east coast
- Interactive map of The Great Escarpment
- Coordinates: 31°59′S 149°53′E
- Location: Eastern Australia
- Range: Great Dividing Range
- Age: Mesozoic

Dimensions
  - Length: circa 3,600 kilometres (2,200 mi)

The Great Escarpment in eastern Australia is an escarpment that runs east of the Great Dividing Range along most of the east of the continent. It was created due to formation of a new continental margin in the Mesozoic, followed by tectonic uplifting of the divide and then scarp retreat. The escarpment is estimated to be approximately 3,600 kilometres (2,200 mi) in length, from north to south.

== Formation ==
The Great Escarpment formed about 80 million years ago due to scarp retreat from a new continental edge formed by rifting. This was similar to the model in the western rift of East Africa. The Great Divide is an upwarp that lies tens or hundreds of kilometers from the chasmic fault of the continental margin, creating a drainage divide. The sequence of formation appears to have started with erosion of the plain and formation of a river pattern. The traces of these rivers can still be seen. There were then widespread flows of basalt, after which the Great Divide lifted, and finally the Great Escarpment formed through scarp retreat.

== Description ==
The Great Escarpment rises to several hundred meters. To the east, the coastal zone is relatively flat with fast erosional process rate and few landscape palaeoforms. To the west there are many palaeoforms and process rates are slow. The escarpment forms a series of bluffs along the eastern edge of plateau that stretches east from the Great Dividing Range. In places the escarpment is between 200 and 300 kilometres (120 and 190 mi) closer to the sea than the range. The escarpment is cut by narrow gorges that carry rivers to the sea. These rivers have eroded the tableland between the Great Divide and the escarpment, sometimes leaving parts of the plateau standing out in isolation to the east. Escarpment retreat along the river valleys in the New England region appears to be progressing at about 2 kilometres (1.2 mi) per million years.

== See also ==
- Geography of Australia
- List of escarpments
