= Hanover (schooner) =

Schooner wrecked in Lake Michigan

- HANOVER (schooner) Shipwreck
- U.S. National Register of Historic Places
- Location: Off the coast of Fish Creek, Wisconsin
- NRHP reference No.: 15000710
- Added to NRHP: October 5, 2015

Hanover was a freight schooner that operated on the Great Lakes. The vessel's wreck is located off the coast of Fish Creek, Wisconsin.

== History ==
The Hanover was built in 1853 by shipwright Charles Stevens in Irving, New York and launched in Cattaraugus Creek. The ship was built for Charles H. Lee and James Lee of Buffalo, New York. Charles worked for the firm Lee, Abell & Co and James was a post office clerk. Captain Myron Gage and William D. Talcott also invested in the boat, and Gage became the boat's first Master. The schooner was named for the town of Hanover of which Talcott served as Supervisor.

The Hanover hauled bulk cargo, primarily grain, across the upper Great Lakes. The Hanover also hauled lumber as part of the Lake Michigan lumber trade. For example, in 1854 on a trip from Toledo to Buffalo, the ship arrived with 67,000 feet of lumber, 55 tons of port, 45 barrels of spirits, 144 barrels of pork, and 9,000 barrel staves. In 1860, the ship carried 169,000 feet of lumber on one trip. The boat also changed ownership a number of times. The ship is representative of bulk sailing vessels at the time, with a single deck, two masts, a gross tonnage of 188.3 tons, a length of 109.2 feet, breadth of 26 feet, and depth of 9 feet.

In 1859, Hanover was in tow by John Ely in the Detroit River when the ships jib-topsail and flying jib were set on fire from blowing sparks. The ship was towed and inspected before being released. Also in 1859, Hanover helped rescue eight sailors from the capsized barque B. A. Stanard of Cleveland. In November 1863, Hanover went ashore on Point aux Barque Reef in Lake Huron where the boat filled with water and 600 barrels of flour were soaked. For the 1864 season, Hanover once again changed ownership and received a poor insurance classification, indicating early structural problems. The ship was repaired over the winter, leading to a better insurance rating which once again allowed the ship to take on grain and receive coverage for losses. In May 1866, the ship was hit by a heavy squall that carried away several sails, and a crew member was struck by the boom and knocked unconscious.

Aerial view of the southern portion of Chambers Island, including Hanover Shoal.

The vessel struck a shoal near the Strawberry Islands in November 1867 when it was running light from Chicago to Oconto to claim a load of mixed boards and lumber strips. At the time, the area was poorly charted. The reef protruding from the southeast corner of Chambers Island gained the name "Hanover Shoal" from the wreck. The ship began to be broken up by the next day, and the crew stripped the boat of upper deck works and abandoned it. The ship was insured for $5,000. A Warrant of Attachment was filed at the Town of Gilbralter, Door County to satisfy a debt of $100 owed to John Brown. Salvage rights on the vessel were sold, and Allen Bradley salvaged the wreck, removing rigging and machinery and the ships 1,000lb anchor.

The ship rests in about 20 feet of water with her bow 7 feet from the bottom of the bay. Until 2014, the ship was likely buried under around 8 feet of sand and no zebra or quagga mussels colonized the interior of the bilge, allowing for detailed observation. At the time of the survey, 4 feet of sand had recently been cleared by currents exposing new parts of the boat. In 2015, Hanover was added to the State and the National Register of Historic Places.
