= Rupes Mercator =

Lunar escarpment

- Feature type: Rupes
- Coordinates: 30.21°S 22.84°W

The Rupes Mercator is an escarpment located on the Moon. It is named after the neighboring Mercator crater, a name assigned to it in 1935 by the International Astronomical Union in honor of the Flemish geographer and mathematician Gérard Mercator.
