= Rupes Liebig =

Escarpment on the Moon

- Feature type: Rupes
- Coordinates: 25.14°S 45.92°W

The Rupes Liebig is an escarpment located on the Moon. The cliff is named after the nearby Liebig crater, which in turn was named after the German chemist Justus von Liebig (1803–1873).
