= Magnesian Escarpment =

Most westerly of three prominent north-south escarpments in Wisconsin

Coordinates: 43°16′30″N 89°29′05″W

The Magnesian escarpment is the most westerly of three prominent escarpments that run north-south in Wisconsin. All three escarpments are formed by the edges of layers of sedimentary rocks. The easternmost and most prominent escarpment is the Niagara Escarpment formed where younger and harder layers of dolomite overlay softer sedimentary rocks. The Black River Escarpment is capped by another layer of relatively harder rocks, overlay older softer rocks. The rocks of the Magnesian layer overlay rocks of the Cambrian Period, the oldest sedimentary rocks that contain fossils.

== See also ==
- List of escarpments
