= Rupes Boris =

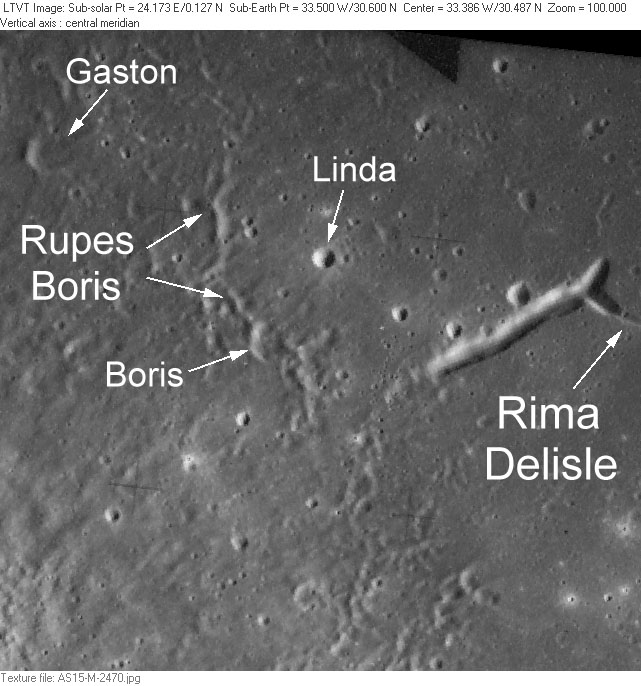
Rupes Boris is on the left of the photo featuring Boris crater

Rupes Boris is a short fault or ridge in the lunar surface that is located in the northwestern quadrant of the Moon's near side, within Mare Imbrium. Its name was adopted in 1985 by the International Astronomical Union, and was taken from the tiny nearby crater Boris. The selenographic coordinates of this feature are 30.5°N 33.5°W, and it has a length of just 4 km.

It has been proposed that Rupes Boris is not actually a lunar escarpment, but may be a ridge of ejecta from the nearby crater Delisle.
