= Great Escarpment, Brazil =

Geological formation

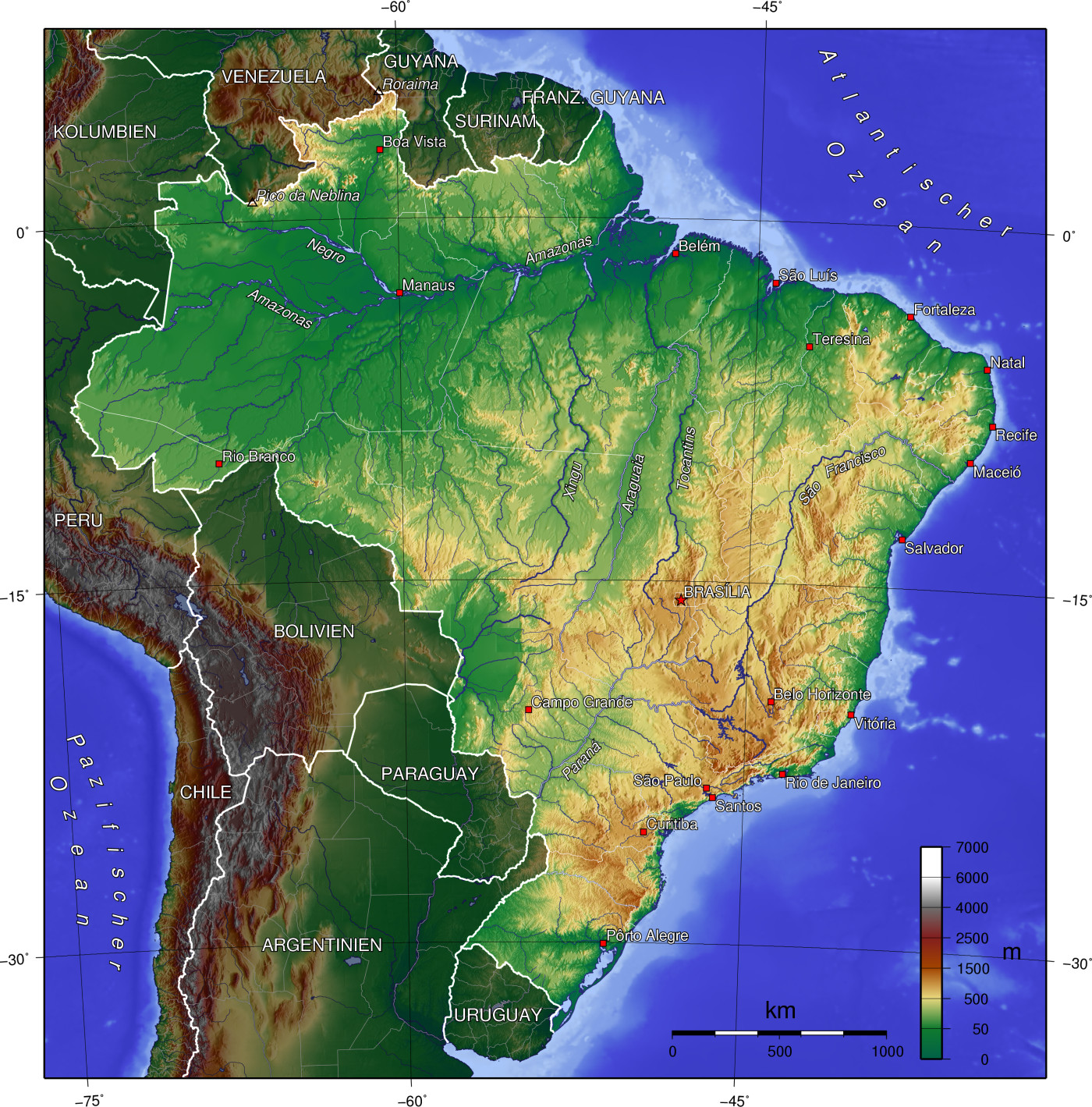
Topographical map of Brazil

The Great Escarpment in Brazil is a major geological formation that runs along much of the eastern coast of Brazil south of the city of Salvador. The escarpment runs along the central and south Atlantic coasts of Brazil, rising sharply and separating the highland plateau from the coast.

The escarpment rises steeply from the coastal plain to as much as 9,000 feet (2,700 m) in height. The top of the escarpment forms a drainage divide between the interior and the coastal plains. Apart from the São Francisco River, most streams flow into the central basin rather than to the coast. The escarpment defines the eastern edge of the Serra do Mar and other mountain ranges.

== See also ==
- List of escarpments
