= Serra do Mar =

Atlantic Forest South-East Reserves
UNESCO World Heritage Site
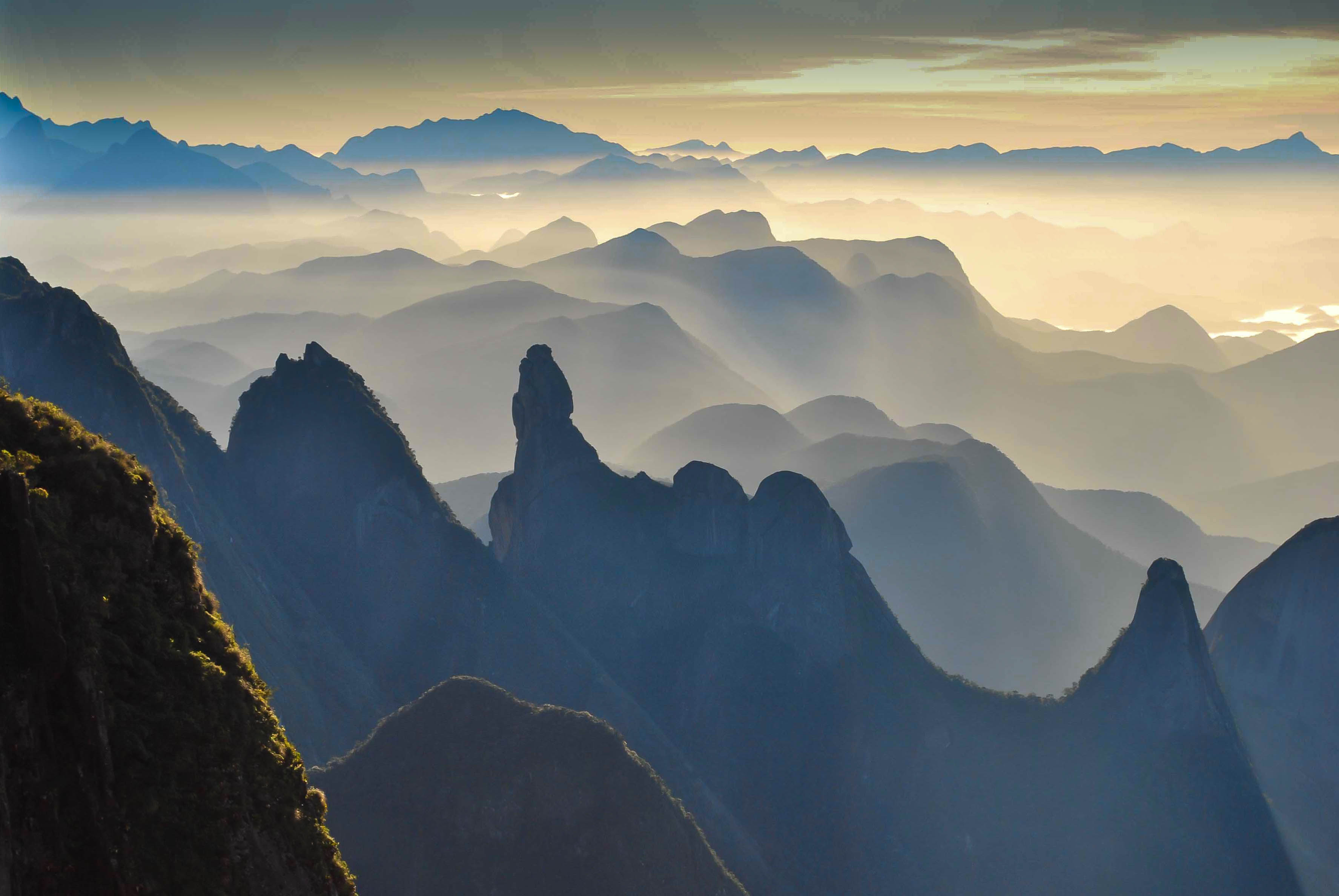
- Serra dos Órgãos National Park

- Location within Brazil
- Location: Rio De Janeiro, São Paulo, Paraná, Santa Catarina, Rio Grande do Sul, Minas Gerais, Espírito Santo, Brazil
- Criteria: Natural: (vii)(ix)(x)
- Reference: 893rev
- Inscription: 1999 (23rd Session)
- Area: 468,193 ha (1,807.70 sq mi)
- Buffer zone: 1,223,557 ha (4,724.18 sq mi)
- Coordinates: 24°10′S 48°0′W

The Serra do Mar (Portuguese: [ˈsɛʁɐ du ˈmaʁ]; Portuguese for 'Sea Range') is a 1,500-kilometre-long (930 mi) system of mountain ranges and escarpments in Southeastern Brazil.

== Geography ==
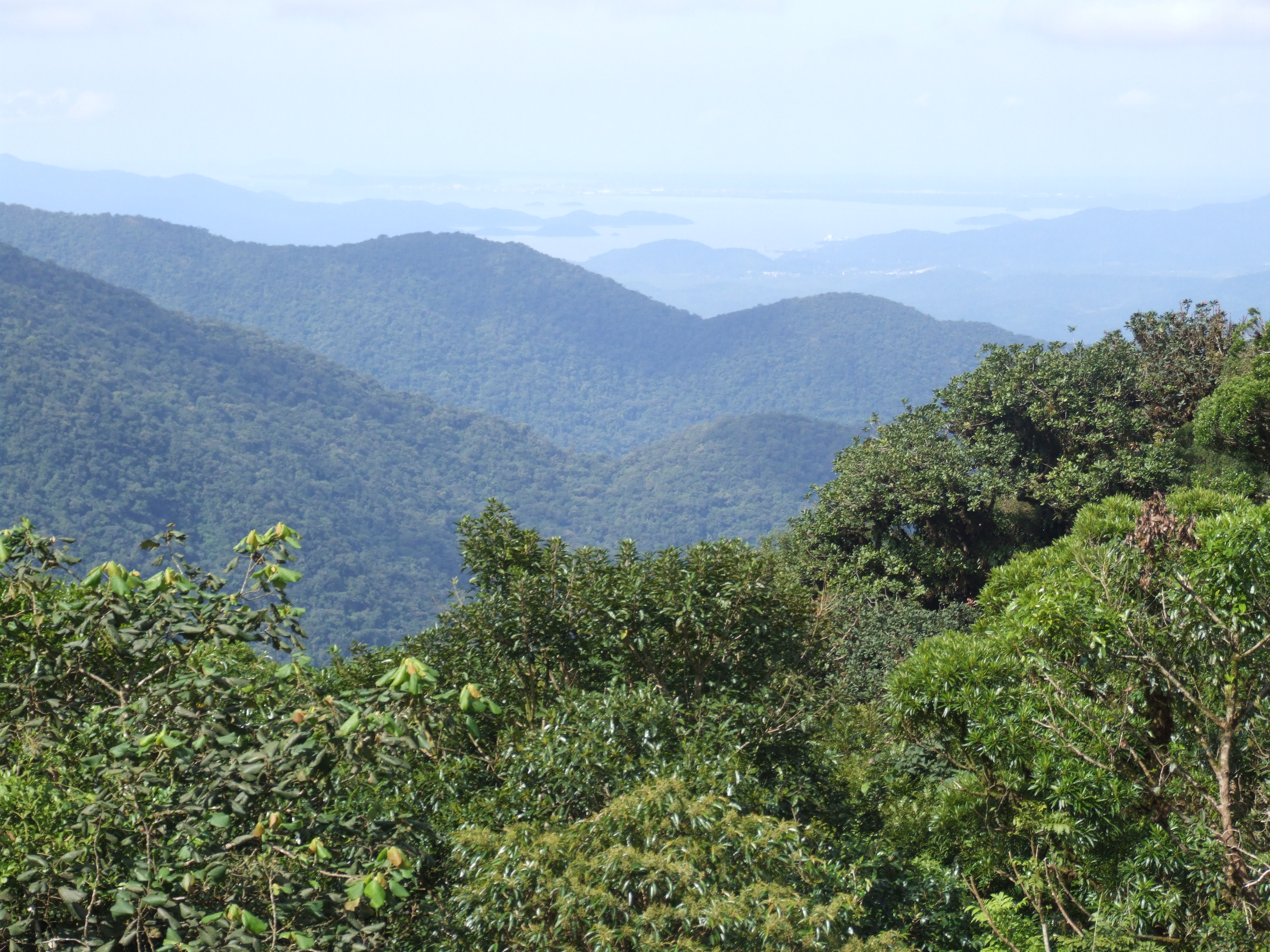
Area of the Atlantic forest in Serra do Mar.

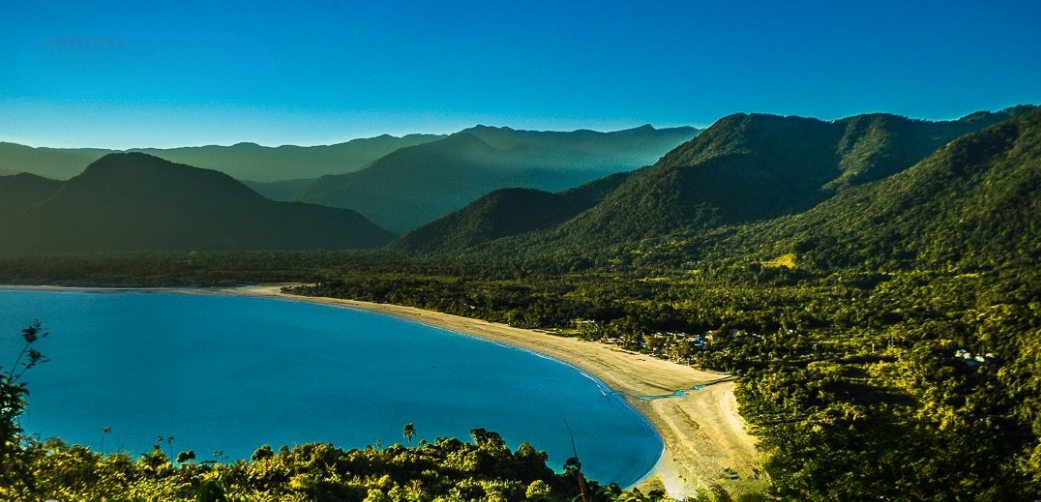
Estaleiro Beach in Ubatuba, São Paulo.

The Serra do Mar runs parallel to the Atlantic Ocean coast from the state of Espírito Santo to southern Santa Catarina, although some literature includes the Serra Geral in the Serra do Mar, in which case the range would extend to northeastern Rio Grande do Sul.

The main escarpment forms the boundary between the sea-level littoral and the inland plateau (planalto), which has a mean altitude of 500 to 1,300 metres (1,600 to 4,300 ft). This escarpment is part of the Great Escarpment that runs along much of the eastern coast of Brazil south from the city of Salvador, Bahia.

== Mountain ranges ==
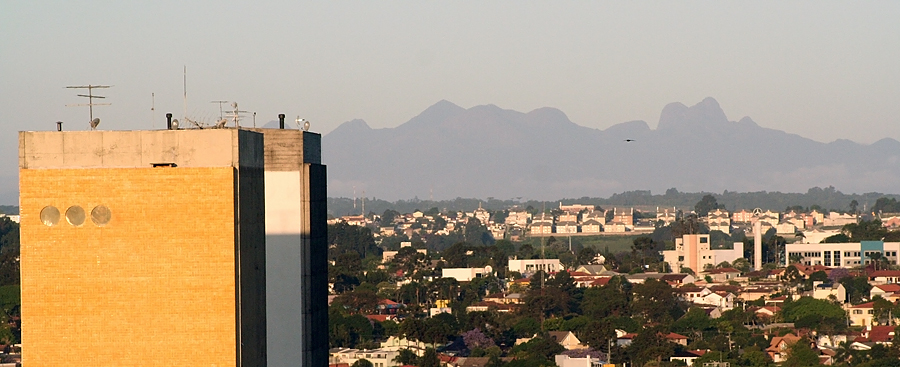
View of the Serra do Mar mountain range from Curitiba, southern Brazil.

The mountain ranges are discontinuous in several places and are given individual names such as Serra de Bocaina, Serra de Paranapiacaba, Serra Negra, Serra dos Órgãos, Serra do Indaiá, etc. The range also extends to some large islands near the coastline, such as Ilhabela and Ilha Anchieta. With an altitude of 2,255 metres (7,398 ft), Pico da Caledônia in Nova Friburgo is among the highest points in Serra do Mar.

Geologically, the range belongs to the massive crystalline rock platform that forms Eastern South America, and tectonically it is very stable. Most of the elevations of Serra do Mar were formed about 60 million years ago.

== Natural history ==
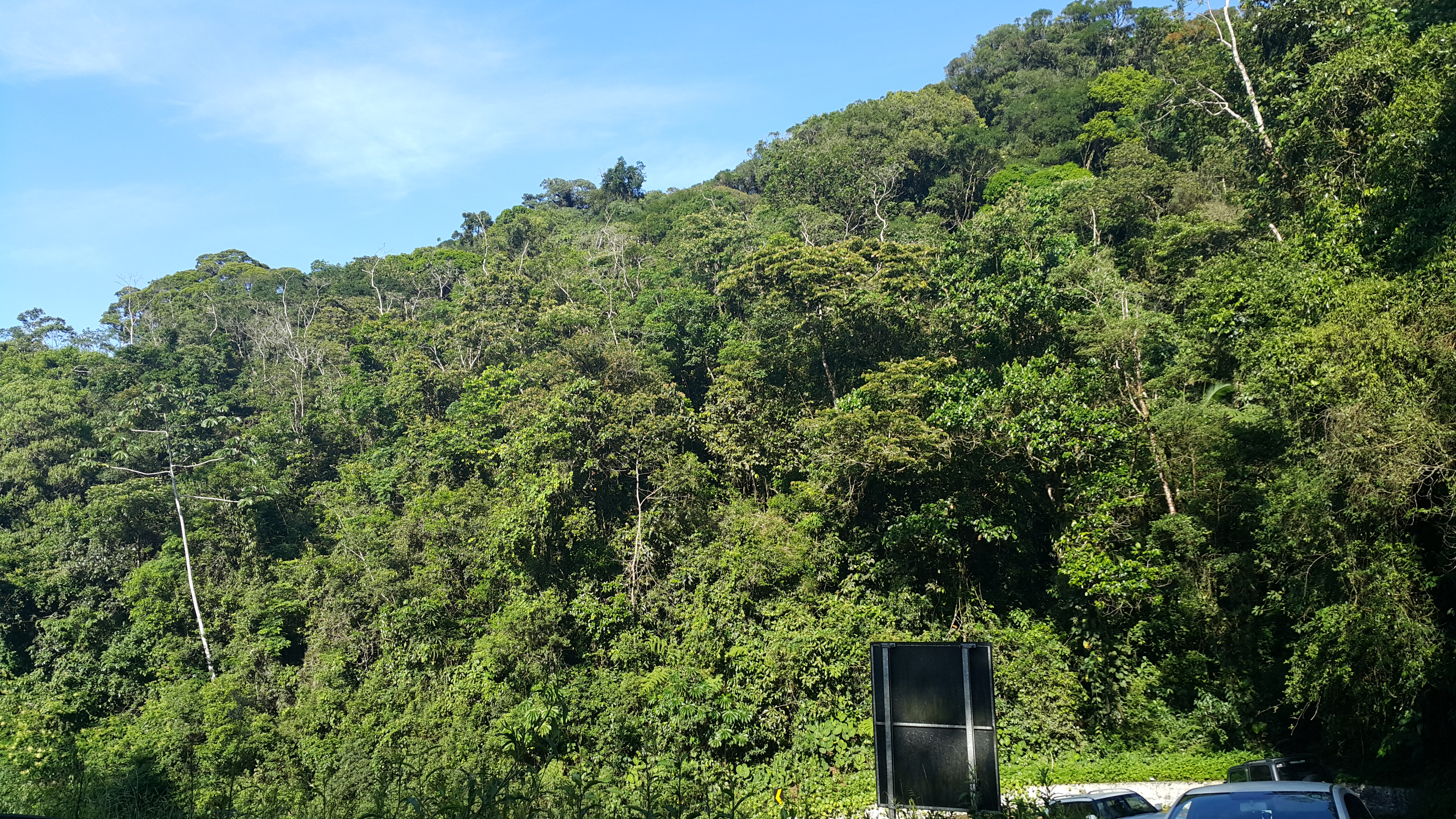
Atlantic Forest seen next to the Oswaldo Cruz highway, in Serra do Mar State Park, near Ubatuba.

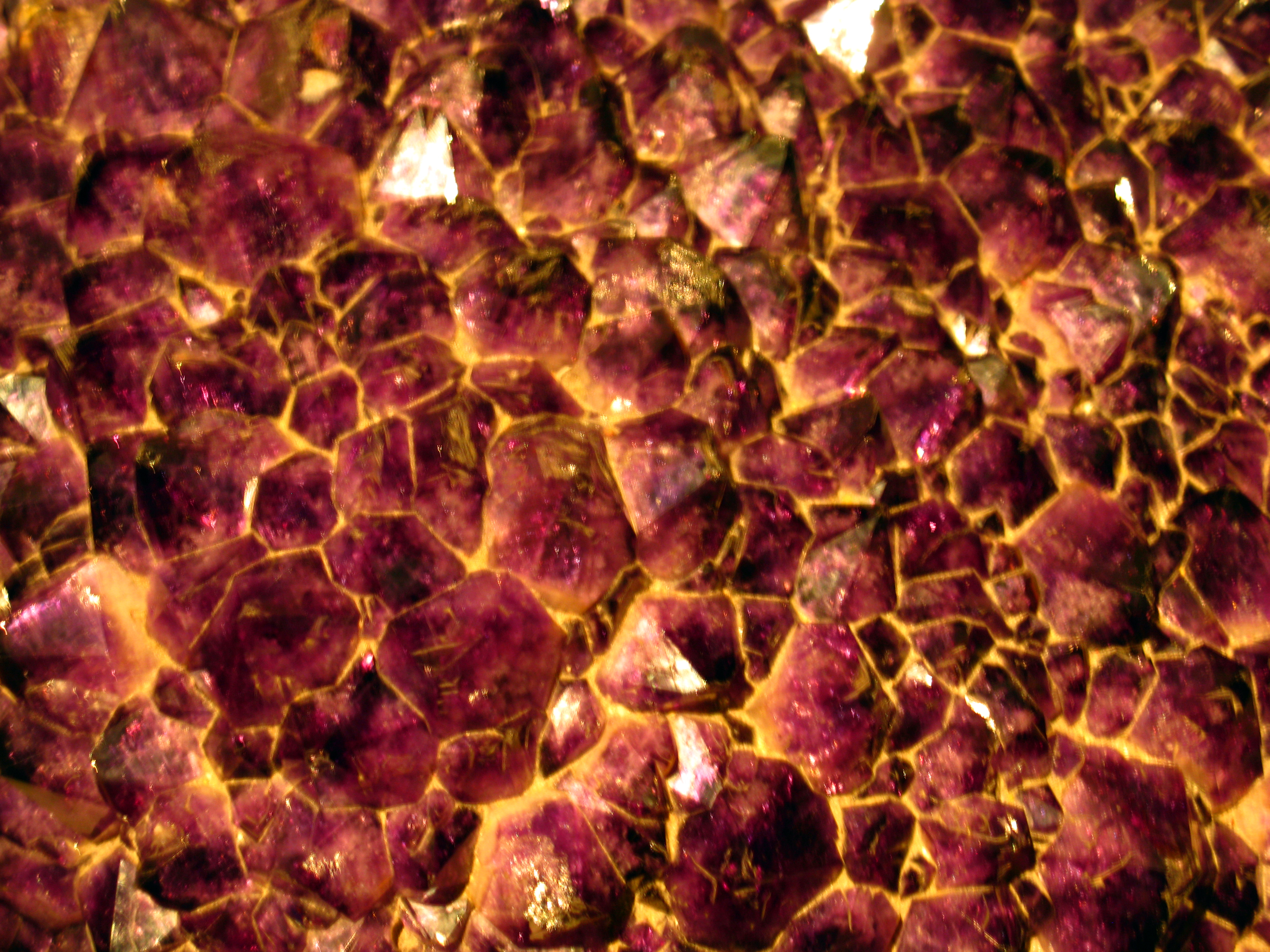
Amethyst from Serra do Mar, on display at the Smithsonian, USA

At the time of the European discovery of Brazil (1500), the Serra do Mar supported a rich and highly diversified ecosystem, composed mainly of lush tropical rain forest, called Atlantic Forest (Mata Atlântica). Due to urbanization and deforestation, however, most of the forest cover has been destroyed and what little cover remains is almost exclusively on the steep escarpments facing the sea.

A chain of national and state parks, ecological stations and biological reserves now protect the Mata Atlântica and its biological heritage, but acid rain, pollution, poachers, clandestine loggers, forest fires, and encroachment by urban areas and farms are still causing active destruction, particularly in the areas around cities. Several large metropolises, such as Vale do Itajaí, Curitiba, São Paulo and Rio de Janeiro are near the Serra do Mar.

Reforestation and recuperation of biological diversity are notoriously difficult to bring about in destroyed rainforest habitats.

== See also ==
- Flora of the Atlantic Forest
- Ecoregions of the Atlantic Forest biome
- List of plants of Atlantic Forest vegetation of Brazil
