= Cadotte family =

- Current region: North America
- Origin: France
- Founder: Mathurin Cadot
- Members: Jean-Baptiste Cadot; Michel Cadotte; Jean-Baptiste Cadotte Jr.; Michel Cadotte, Jr; Madeline Cadotte; Athanasie Cadot; William Whipple Warren
- Properties: Cadotte Trading Post; Cadotte Site

The Cadotte family is a North American family of European and Indigenous American ancestry that became prominent during the North American Fur Trade.

The founder of the Cadottes originated from mainland France and came to the new world in the 17th century and later married a Métis woman as an adult. Later generations such as Jean-Baptiste Cadot and Michel Cadotte would go on to marry children of tribal chiefs.

Many Cadottes appear many times in popular culture and numerous places in both Canada and the United States are named after them.

== Surname ==
The surname Cadotte is a Canadian spelling of the French surname Cadot (meaning little dog). Over time the surname Cadot became Cadotte. The surname for Mathurin Cadot was sometimes spelled as Cadeau.

It is unclear when the transition from Cadot to Cadotte occurred. A ledger from the Cadotte family indicates when this shift may have happened, the book first spelled the surname as Cadotte in 1798. A 1803 contract with North West Company, spells it as Cadotte. A brother of Michel uses the surname in a 1795 contract. It is very likely the family adopted the name Cadotte before the 1800s. (To keep the article constant and to avoid confusion all family members born before the 1750s will go by the surname Cadot.)

== First generations ==
=== Mathurin Cadot ===
According to journalist Robert Silbernagel, the first Cadotte family member to settle around Lake Superior was Mathurin Cadot. (Note: His surname is also spelled Cadeau, For further information about his surname click here.)

Mathurin was born to René Cadot and Renée Rusgande in 1649 in mainland France, he later moved to the Americas in his youth. It is unknown when exactly he arrived in New France.

According to author Walter O'Meara, he came to Sault Ste. Marie in 1671. According to journalist Robert Silbernagel, Mathurin was at the convocation in Sault Ste-Marie the same year.

Mathurin Cadot possibly started a fur business illegally as a coureur des bois sometime during the 1670s and early 1680s. In 1686 he gained an official license to legally trade with the natives (mainly with the Odawa).

In 1688, records say he married a woman named Marie-Catherine Durand in Montreal. Catherine was a métis of Wendat ancestry. Mathurin and Catherine would produce many children, the children include:

- Marie Joseph Cadot (1689–1746)
- Marie Louise Cadot (1690–1708) died in childhood.
- Jean-Francois Cadot (1693–1743)
- Charles Cadot (1695–1763)
- Marie Jeanne Cadot (1697–1759)
- René Cadot (1699–1749)
- Mathurin Cadot Jr (1701–1777)

He later on retired in 1690 and moved to a farm near Montreal. He turned his business over to the half-brother of his wife. Mathurin Sr would die in 1729 at the age 80 in Batiscan, Québec.

=== Second generation ===
Mathurin Cadot Sr's sons would also engage in the fur trader. Jean-Francois only did one trip to Michilimackinac in 1712. René and Charles on the other hand did numerous trips to Michilimackinac in the early 1700s. The brothers would use the money they earned from the fur trade to buy homes in St. Lawrence Lowlands and settle families. René would go on to marry Marie Louise Proteau and Charles would go on to marry Denise Thouin.

Jean-Francois would go on to marry Marie-Josephe Proteau and later on Marie Françoise Rivard, Jean-Francois and Marie-Josephe Proteau would give birth to the following:

- Joseph Louis Cadot (1722–1730) died in childhood.
- Jean-Baptiste Cadot
- Alex Cadot (1725–1757)
- Charles Cadot (1727–1779)
- August Cadot (1728–1772)
- Michel Cadot (1729–1784)
- Marie Joseph Cadot (1730–1737) died in childhood.

== Jean Baptiste Cadot Sr. & Wives ==
Jean-Baptiste Cadot (Note: The surname becomes Cadotte over time. For more information about this click here.)(December 5, 1723 – November 1, 1800), also referred to as Ke-che-sub-ud-ese, was a Métis voyageur and fur trader.

He joined in the North American fur trade when he was 18. After the birth of his daughter he married Athanasie Cadot under Catholic tradition.

During Pontiac's War he convinced the Ojibwe around Lake Superior not to join in the war. During the American Revolutionary War he worked for the British as an interpreter and helped recruit Ojibwe to fight in the Battle of St. Louis.

His death would ignite a controversy over the ownership of Sault Ste. Marie. His descendants would go on to be influential in the North American fur trade around Lake Superior. He would appear many times in popular culture in both Canada and the United States.

=== Wives of Jean Baptiste Cadot ===
==== Catherine Cadot ====
Catherine (Note: Most records refer to her as “sauvagesse de saulteaux”) was an Ojibwa woman (her Ojibwa name isn't known), she was a relative to Biauswah (II) and possibly part of the Loon clan (Maang Dodem). She was the second wife of Jean-Baptiste Cadot.

After Jean-Baptiste Cadot's death she married a voyager named Louis Ducharme dit Nez Rouge. She had a daughter with Louis named Thérèse Ducharme. Catherine would die after 19 May 1819.

She had the following children with Jean-Baptiste Cadot:

- Augustin Cadotte (ca. 1770–1825)
- Charlotte Cadotte (ca. 1779–1851)
- Joseph Cadotte (ca. 1778- ca 1836)
- Marie Cadotte (ca. 1791–1851)

==== Athanasie Cadot ====
Athanasie Cadot (Note: The surname becomes Cadotte later on, for further information about this click here.) (1736–1776) was a Nipissing Ojibwe trader, diplomat, and the first wife of fur trader Jean-Baptiste Cadot.

She began living with Cadot after he entered the wilderness. Following the birth of their daughter, the two were married. During Pontiac's War, she saved the life of Alexander Henry the elder while pregnant with her son Michel Cadotte. She later accompanied her children to Montreal, where they attended school, until her death in 1776.

Historians have noted her character and energy, considering her an important contributor to her husband's success and a significant figure in the North American fur trade.

===== Children with Athanasie =====
Athanasie Cadot and Jean-Baptiste Cadot had the following children:

- Marie Renée Cadotte (1756–1786), survived to adulthood.
- Charlotte Cadotte (1759–1768), died in childhood.
- Jean-Baptiste Cadotte Jr., survived to adulthood.
- Michel Cadotte, survived to adulthood.
- Joseph Cadotte (1767–1773), died in childhood.

== Michel & Madeline Cadotte ==
=== Madeline Cadotte ===
Madeline Cadotte (c. 1760 or 1770- between 1852 to 1860) was an Ojibwe woman of the ajijaak dodem.

She was the eldest daughter of chief Waubujejack. After marrying fur trader Michel Cadotte according to Ojibwe tradition, she went along with her husband's expeditions and used her lineage to help form vital partnerships with the indigenous peoples in the area. Around the start of the 19th century, she and her husband would build a permanent home on Madeline Island, where she would become a powerful figure in the area.

Michel and Madeline were married a second time under the customs of the Catholic Church, she was baptized on the same day and given her European name. Close to the end of her life she was interviewed by her grandson William Whipple Warren when he was writing about the history of the Ojibwe.

She has been regarded as a prominent figure to the history of the Apostle Islands. Numerous places in Wisconsin are named after her, such as Madeline island which is important to the Ojibwe religion.

=== Michel Cadotte ===
Michel Cadotte (Note: also spelled Michael, and the surname as Cadott, Cadeau, and other variations) (July 22, 1764 – July 8, 1837), Kechemeshane in Ojibwe, (Note: Gichi-miishen in the contemporary spelling, meaning "Great Michel") was a Métis fur trader of Ojibwe, Wendat and French-Canadian descent. He dominated the business in the area of the south shore of Lake Superior.

He gained a strategic alliance through marriage to Ikwesewe (also spelled Equawasay), the daughter of the head of the White Crane clan; men from this clan were the hereditary chiefs of the Lake Superior Ojibwe. Cadotte's trading post at La Pointe on Madeline Island was a critical center for the trade between the Lake Superior band and the British and United States trading companies.

=== Children of Madeline & Michel ===
She had the following children with Michel Cadotte:

- Michel Cadotte Jr
- Marguerite Cadotte: She was born on December 15, 1788 on Chippewa River.
- Jean Baptiste Cadotte (1790): He never married and left no known children.
- Augustin Cadotte (February 2, 1794 - April 28, 1872). He was an interpreter for the British in the war of 1812. By 1821, he was working as an interpreter for the American Fur Company.
- Étienne Cadotte: died in childhood due to being shoot my a musket in 1803.
- Julie Cadotte
- Mary Cadotte
- Antoine Cadotte: born on April 18, 1803 at La Pointe and died after 1860 census and before the 1870 census.Antoine had a son named Frank.
- Charlotte Cadotte
- Joseph Cadotte: (1807- died sometime around 1849)

== Jean Baptiste Cadotte Jr ==
Jean Baptiste Cadotte Jr (October 25, 1761 – 1818) was a Métis fur trader.

== Saugemauqua ==
=== Life ===
She was born ca. 1780-1783 reportedly in La Pointe, Wisconsin. Who her parents are is unclear, she is the daughter of a French Canadian man with the surname Piquette and a Ojibwe woman.

In 1797 she married Jean-Baptiste Cadotte Jr.

==== 1798 execution ====
In 1798, at Fond du Lac Jean-Baptiste Cadotte Jr ordered the execution of an Ojibwe man for killing a fur trader. During the Ojibwe man’s execution Madeline and Saugemauqua both pleaded for the man’s life.

==== Other ====
She had a divorce with Cadotte in 1810.

She had affairs with Lewis Saurin Johnston. In 1834, she remarried to Joseph Sauvé dit Plante after the birth of her illegitimate daughters.

She died on October 12, 1852 at the age 72 in Sault Ste. Marie.

=== Personal life ===
When David Thompson met her at Jean Baptiste’s Red Lake River trading post in March 1798 he called her:

a very handsome native woman, also the daughter of a Frenchman

— David Thompson, David Thompson's Narrative of His Explorations in Western America, 1784-1812, 252

Saugemauqua is her Ojibwe name. She sometimes goes by her French name Jeanette Piquette. In various documents her first name is spelled as: Janette, Jeanne, Jeannette, Joanne, and Marie Jeanne. Her last name is also spelled as Paquet, Piquet, or Piquette.

=== Family ===
Her dad was probably Jean Baptiste Piquette, a longtime resident of Sault Ste. Marie.

She may have also been related to François Piquette, a clerk for Jean-Baptiste Cadot. We know that her siblings are named: Joseph Piquette, Mary Ann (Piquette) Meniclier, and Jean Baptiste Piquette.

Her uncle from her mother's side was Waub-ish-gaug-aug-e (White Crow or White Raven), who was a son of Kish-kiman. Kish-kiman was a cousin of Equaysayway and the father to the wife of Michel Cadotte Jr.

=== Legacy ===
Dr John P. DuLong called her a “resourceful woman of the fur trade worthy of study all on her own.”

== Michel Cadotte Jr. ==
Michel Cadotte Jr. (Also known as Petit Cadotte or Mishonse) (1787–1856) was a fur trader and veteran of the War of 1812.

== Benjamin Cadotte ==
Benjamin Cadotte was a distant cousin of Michel Cadotte and worked as a clerk for his cousin then later employed by American Fur Company.

Benjamin’s family were the first settlers in Superior, Wisconsin. Later on an anveune in the town was named after him.

== William Whipple Warren ==
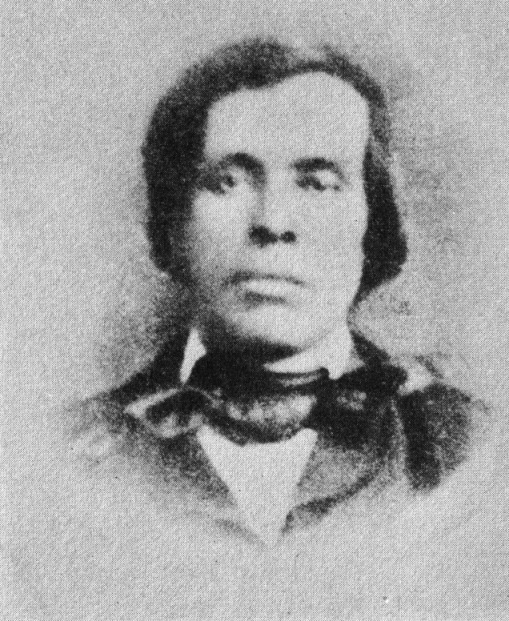
William Whipple Warren (c. 1851)

William Whipple Warren (May 27, 1825 – June 1, 1853) was a historian, interpreter, and legislator in the Minnesota Territory. The son of Lyman Marcus Warren, an American fur trader and Mary Cadotte, the mixed ancestry daughter of fur trader Michel Cadotte, he was of Ojibwe and French descent. William lived in two cultures, because his father was white, he was not considered Ojibwe, but an Ojibwe "relative", because in the Ojibwe patrilineal culture, inheritance and property were passed through the paternal line. His mother was Ojibwe and he learned her culture from her family. He is the first historian of the Ojibwe people in the European tradition.

In the fall of 1845, Warren moved at the age of 20 from Wisconsin to Crow Wing in present-day Minnesota. He worked as an interpreter for the fur trader Henry Mower Rice.

Bilingual and educated in the United States style, Warren started collecting stories from the oral tradition of the Ojibwe to tell their history. He drew from oral history to tell about the people prior to their encounter with Europeans, and combined it with documentation in the European style. After suffering from tuberculosis for many years, he died as a young man of 28 from a hemorrhage on June 1, 1853, and was buried in Saint Paul, Minnesota. His history was published posthumously in 1885 by the Minnesota Historical Society. A revised, annotated edition was published in 2009.
