= Michel Cadotte Jr. =

- Born: September 6, 1787
- Died: March 11, 1856 (aged 68)
- Parents: Michel Cadotte (father); Madeline Cadotte (mother)
- Relatives: Jean-Baptiste Cadot (grandfather); Keesh-ke-mun (father in-law)
- Family: Cadotte family

Michel Cadotte Jr. (Also known as Petit Cadotte or Mishonse) (1787–1856) was a fur trader and veteran of the War of 1812.

== Early life ==
Cadotte was born on September 6, 1787, on Chippewa River (Wisconsin). He was the son of Michel Cadotte and Madeline Cadotte. He was baptized on July 10, 1799, on Mackinac Island. On October 31, 1800, at Sault Ste. Marie, when Cadotte was 13, he watched his grandfather Jean Baptiste Cadot lay upon his deathbed. His grandfather asked him to see his sons Michel and Jean-Baptiste Cadotte Jr. (they were both absent due to their trading activities), Jean Baptiste Cadot wished to see his sons:

to counsel them to try if possible to find his lost papers relative to the gift of the South side of the Sault Ste Marie duly made to him by the Chippewa Chiefs and Warriors.

— Testimony of Michel Cadotte, Jr

The next day Cadotte's grandfather passed away and Cadotte informed his father and his uncle the news about the alleged documents for Cadot's ownership of Sault Ste. Marie.

== Career ==
During the War of 1812 he served as interpreter to the British. During the war, he prevented violence between the Indians and the Americans, despite being on the side of the British.

== Later life and death ==
On June 20, 1829, on Mackinac Island, Cadotte married the daughter of chief Kish-ki-man Esther Cadotte. Cadotte died on March 11, 1856, at La Pointe, Wisconsin.
