= Waubujejack =

Ojibwe chief

- Children: Equaysayway and Tagwagane
- Father: Akeguiow
- Relatives: Shadawish (brother)

Waubujejack was an Ojibwe chief of the Crane clan who lived near Chequamegon Bay. Since he was chief through descent he gained respect among the Ojibwe, despite this he was neglectful of his duties as chief.

In the 21st century, one of his descendants made an art piece depicting him.

== Life ==
He was the son of chief Akeguiow. According to Dr DuLong, Ke-che-ne-zuh-yauh might have been the father of Akeguiow. The brother of Waubujejack was Sha-da-wish.

After the death of Waubujejack’s father he succeeded his father and became chief. He became chief of Madeline Island including La Pointe, as well as the chief of the Crane Clan of Chequamegon Bay. Since he was made chief by descent rather than by being appointed by a foreign influence it caused him to gain more respect among the Ojibwe.

He then had a daughter named Equaysayway and a son named Tagwagane. According to journalist Robert Silbernagel, fur trader Michel Cadotte might have given the chief a gift in order to gain his approval to marry his daughter, Equaysayway.

According to historian William Whipple Warren, Waubujejack was neglectful of his duties as chief and was later succeed by An-daig-we-os.

According to Heather Armstrong, the chief married a woman named Tchikitchiwanokwe (1786-1883). According to Lawrence Barkwell, he died during November 1813 in battle.

== Names ==
Members of the Ojibwe tribe, like those of many other Native American communities, often used multiple names over time and were flexible in adopting Christian names and surnames.

His name Waubujejack means white crane. His Ojibwe named is also spelled as Waubijijauk. Other variations of his name are Wabadidjak, Waub-uj-e-jauk, Waub-ij-e-jauk, and Waabajijaak.

He was also known as La Grue (The Crane).

== Legacy ==
One of his descendants made a sculpture titled Gateway to Madeline to the Island, the sculpture depicts the chief rising from the red earth. The artist for the piece was interviewed on PBS North.
