= Madeline Cadotte =

Ojibwe woman of the ajijaak dodem

- Equaysayway
- Born: c. 1760; St. Croix River (Wisconsin–Minnesota)
- Died: Between 1852 and 1860; Madeline Island
- Spouse: Michel Cadotte
- Parents: Waubujejack (father); Unknown (mother)
- Relatives: Tagwagane (brother) Mamongazeda (great-great uncle)
- Family: Cadotte family

Madeline Cadotte (c. 1760 or 1770- between 1852 to 1860) was an Ojibwe woman of the ajijaak dodem.

She was the eldest daughter of chief Waubujejack. After marrying fur trader Michel Cadotte according to Ojibwe tradition, she went along with her husband's expeditions and used her lineage to help form vital partnerships with the indigenous peoples in the area. Around the start of the 19th century, she and her husband would build a permanent home on Madeline Island, where she would become a powerful figure in the area.

Michel and Madeline were married a second time under the customs of the Catholic Church, she was baptized on the same day and given her European name. Close to the end of her life she was interviewed by her grandson William Whipple Warren when he was writing about the history of the Ojibwe.

She has been regarded as a prominent figure to the history of the Apostle Islands. Numerous places in Wisconsin are named after her, such as Madeline island which is important to the Ojibwe religion.

== Early life ==
Madeline was born around the time the French gave up what is modern day Canada to the British. According to historian Brenda Child, not much is known about her early life before she married Michel Cadotte. Dr DuLong places her date birth around 1770 while journalist Robert Silbernagel placed her date of birth at 1760. She was born along St. Croix River.

She was a member of the Crane Clan, which was usually responsible for creating chiefs in the Anishinaabe clan system. She was the oldest daughter of chief Waubujejack and a sister to Tagwagane. Mamongazeda is her great-great uncle. She is second cousin to White crow and White fish. Madeline's Ojibwe lineage would benefit her and her husband in developing important partnerships with the natives in the area.

=== Meets Michel Cadotte ===
According to Silbernagel, she probably met fur trader Michel Cadotte sometime in the early 1780s after Michel left his father's home and probably meeting at Michel's first trading post on the Namekagon River not too far where Madeline was born. While according to Nelson Hamilton Ross, Madeline met Michel when he was making his rounds near Chequamegon Bay.

=== Ojibwe marriage ===
According to Dr John P. DuLong, Madeline and Michel got married according to Ojibwe tradition around 1786 on Namekagon River.

Not much is known about how and when the wedding took place; there is no written record of when this marriage was recognized by their Ojibwe family. All of this is due to the Ojibwe tradition of documenting important events orally rather than writing them down. (Note: When Madeline was interviewed by her grandson William Warren, there was no mention of this marriage.)

According to Silbernagel, it’s likely that Michel offered a gift to Madeline’s father in order to win his approval.

== Expeditions with Michel Cadotte ==
By 1787, Michel and Madeline were living together on Chippewa River. During that same year in the beginning of there fur trapping season, Madeline Cadotte was at a camp and her husband was heading back to the camp. A chief from across the river grabbed his musket and tried to shoot her husband. It missed her husband and it nearly hit her.

=== Expeditions to upper parts of Mississippi River ===
During the late 1780s she joined her husband on expeditions to Chippewa River.

Between 1792 to 1793, she and other Native American women would join Michel Cadotte and Jean Baptiste Cadotte Jr on their journey to Lake Itasca. (Note: Years later, Madeline told her grandson that she and these women were left at Fond Du Lac in 1792; according to Madeline they were left there because their husbands were heading into a dangerous region and the men did not want to be burdened by women.)

=== 1798 execution ===
In 1798, at Fond du Lac Jean-Baptiste Cadotte Jr ordered the execution of an Ojibwe man for killing a fur trader. During the Ojibwe man’s execution Madeline and Saugemauqua both pleaded for the man’s life. (Note: According to Warren, “The wife of Michel, who is still living at the advanced age, often speaks of this occurrence in her early life, and never without a voice trembling with the deepest emotion.”)

== Establishment of family home ==
Photo of log shack that was possibly the home of Michael and Madeline Cadotte.

Around the start of the 19th century she and her husband established a trading post on and a new permanent family home on Madeline Island. Around this time Madeline probably would spend most of her time with family and 6 of her children at her new home.

Madeline would eventually become a powerful figure of the region. By 1806, Madeline's and Michel's business was steady. When Thomas McKenney visited Madeline Island in 1826, he called her:

a worthy, well-disposed woman

— Thomas L. McKenney, Sketches of a Tour to the Lakes, 262

== Catholic wedding and baptism ==
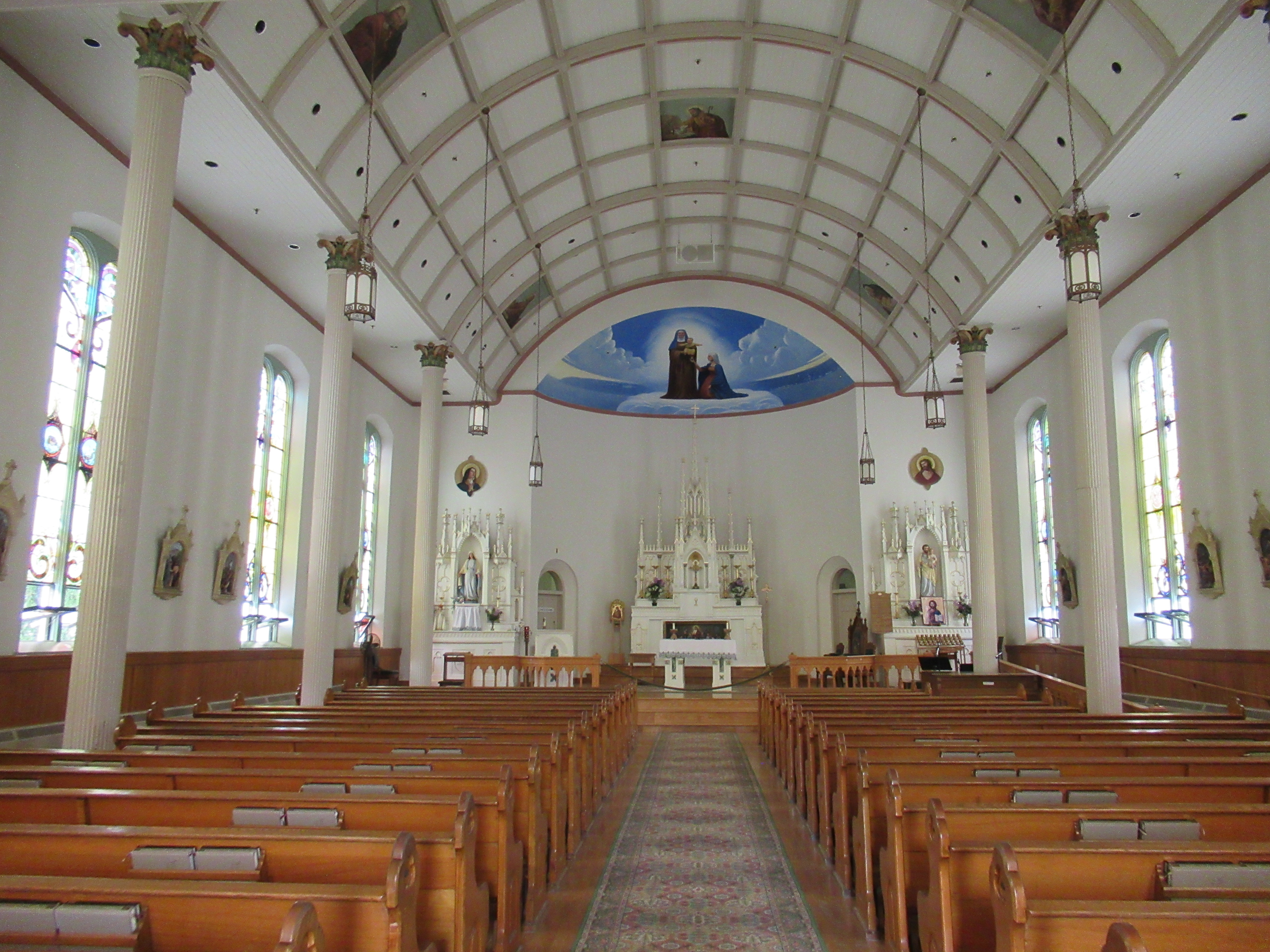

Madeline and Michel Cadotte married again in the Catholic tradition on July 26, 1830 at St. Anne's Church on Mackinac Island. There were numerous reasons why the couple decided to marry a second time decades after their first marriage: powerful court cases were changing how marriages between European men and Native American women were perceived by the law, treaties had a big impact on mixed race couples, and Protestant missionaries were arriving in the region.

The wedding was performed by Father Jean Dejean. The witnesses to the wedding include William McGulpin, Alexis Corbin, and Alexis Corbin Jr. Her children were also present at the wedding. Madeline was baptized on the same day right around the age of 60.

During this time Madeline and Michel received a marriage license from the county clerk at Mackinac Island so their marriage would be recognized by the United States government.

== Later years and death ==
Land on Madeline Island would eventually be deeded to her and her husband. Her husband Michel Cadotte died in 1837.

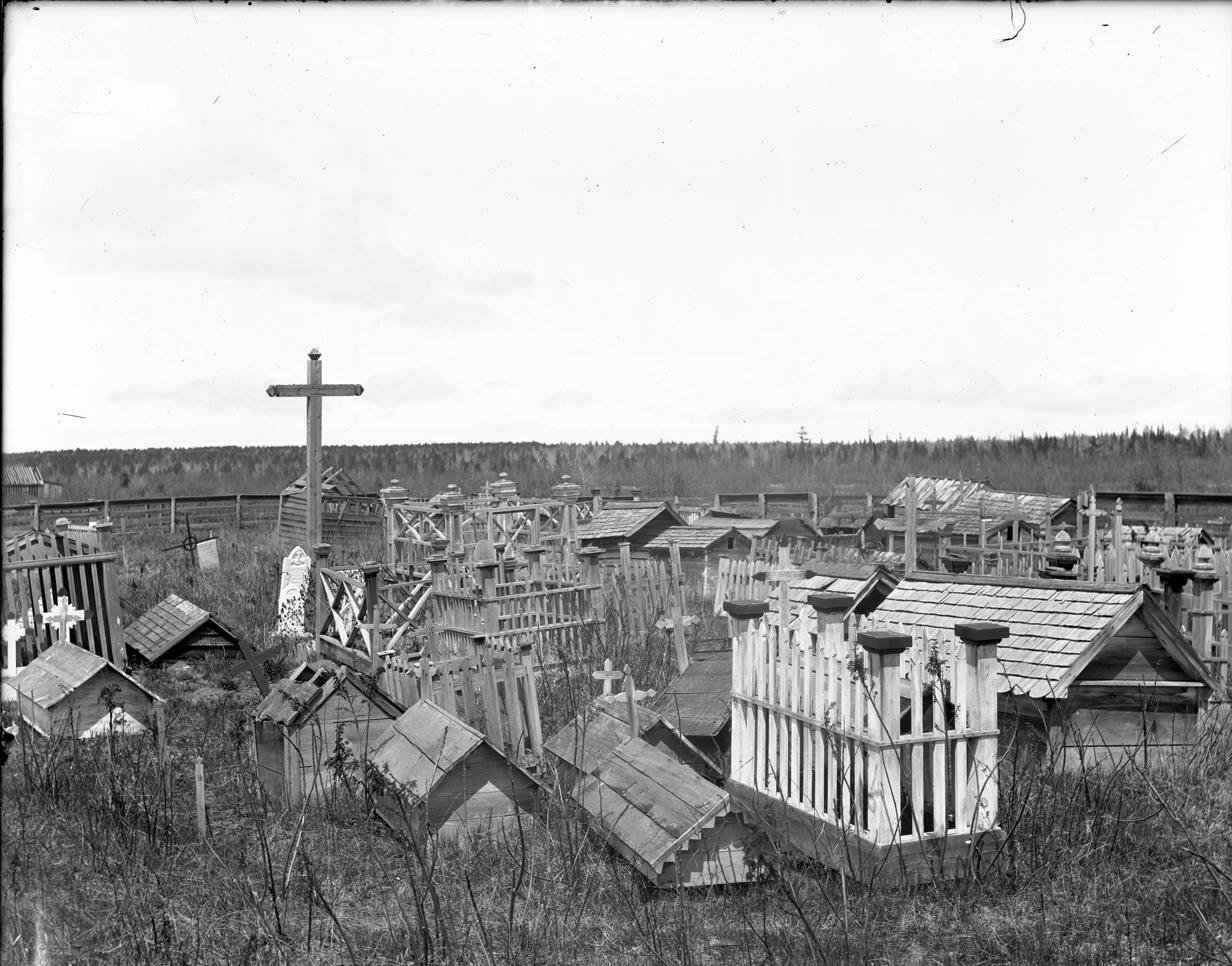

After her husband’s death her grandson William Whipple Warren was interviewing her and Ojibwe elders about tribal history. Census records report that in 1850 she was living at La Pointe with her son Antoine Cadotte and recorded her age as 90. She would die some time after the 1852 census and before the 1860 census.

It is believed that Madeline is buried somewhere on the Madeline island. According to the Canadian Encyclopedia, she is buried somewhere at La Pointe. According to Susan Lampert Smith, Madeline is buried at La Pointe Indian Cemetery.

== Personal life ==
=== Religion and Culture ===
Historian Brenda Child noted that Michel and Madeline did not marry in the à la façon du pays fashion instead marrying under Catholic tradition. Child argues that Madeline might have converted to Catholicism in order to break away from the control of her father, but Child argues this was a poor way to escape the patriarchy.

Madeline and her family had to negotiate cultural conflicts between their Ojibwe heritage, French Canadian Catholic heritage, and later on Protestant theology. She and her husband had their children baptized as Catholics.

Nonetheless Madeline was connected to Ojibwe culture through her powerful Ojibwe family that had ties to Madeline Island which was once the center of the Ojibwe religion. She was familiar with Ojibwe beliefs even if she wasn’t a practitioner.

=== Names ===
People in the Ojibwe tribe like many other Native American tribes went by multiple names over time and would be flexible when adopting Christian names and surnames.

==== Ojibwe name ====
Equaysayway was her Ojibwe name which means traveling woman. Ikwezewe is usually how her Ojibwe name is spelled in the double vowel system of the Ojibwe language. Other variations of her Ojibwe name include Kwesewen, Qugsuanay/Ikwesens which means little girl.

Her marriage record refer to her as Marie Magdeliene la Grue ou achichak; this has led some to think that achichak was a variation of her Ojibwe name and La Grue was her surname. This is not the case: La Grue is french for the crane and achichak is the French priest's attempt to spell ajijaak. La Grue would also appear again in her baptism record.

==== European name ====
The name Madeline is a corruption of her European name Magdelaine. Her name is spelled as Marie Madeleine.She was given her European name when she was baptized to Catholicism.

== Legacy and recognition ==
Bob Mackreth placed her on his list of women who played an important part in the history of the Apostle Islands. Madeline Island museum had an exhibit called Women of Madeline Island, the exhibit included notable women like Madeline Cadotte.

=== Places named after her ===
==== Places at La Pointe ====
During the 1830s non-natives at La Pointe, Wisconsin decided to name numerous places after her. This included a school, hotel, and churches.

==== Madeline Island ====
Madeline Island is named after her. At one point, the island was named after her husband. However, Madeline was so prominent at the trading post and the communities around the region that the island had its name changed to Madeleine Island. Around the time she was baptized, Madeline's father declared the island to be named after her.

The spelling of the island’s name was changed to Madeline when the Americans defeated the British. There were unsuccessful attempts to name the island Virginia island. The name Madeline Island became the preferred name by the late 19th century.
