= Athanasie Cadot =

Ojibwe trader and diplomat (1736-1776)

- Equawaice
- Born: 1736
- Died: 1776 (aged 39–40)
- Citizenship: Nipissing
- Occupations: trader, homemaker, diplomat
- Spouse: Jean-Baptiste Cadot (m. 1756)
- Children: Marie Renée, Charlotte, Jean-Baptiste Jr, Michel, Joseph
- Relatives: Matchekewis

Athanasie Cadot (Note: The surname becomes Cadotte later on, for further information about this click here.) (1736–1776) was a Nipissing Ojibwe trader, diplomat, and the first wife of fur trader Jean-Baptiste Cadot.

She began living with Cadot after he entered the wilderness. Following the birth of their daughter, the two were married. During Pontiac's War, she saved the life of Alexander Henry the elder while pregnant with her son Michel Cadotte. She later accompanied her children to Montreal, where they attended school, until her death in 1776.

Historians have noted her character and energy, considering her an important contributor to her husband's success and a significant figure in the North American fur trade.

== Early life ==
Athanasie Cadot was born around 1736 in the Lake Nipissing region, northwest of Lake Huron. She was an Ojibwe woman of the Catfish clan (Awause, or Awaazisii) and was identified as Nipissing.

She was the daughter of a chief and the sister of Shosh-e-man. She was also related to Madjeckewiss, and her children were first cousins to Chief Nodin and second cousins to Chief Great Marten. These family connections later contributed to her ability to establish a wide network of relationships with Indigenous communities.

Fur trader Jean-Baptiste Cadot lived with her after he arrived in the region. In 1750, at Sault Ste. Marie, Louis Legardeur de Repentigny began constructing a fort and found Athanasie living with Cadot. Repentigny instructed the couple to begin farming.

Following the birth of their daughter, Marie Renée, Athanasie and Cadot chose to formalize their relationship in the European tradition and traveled to Michilimackinac. They were married at Sainte Anne Church on October 28, 1756, in a ceremony officiated by Father Le Franc. According to historian John P. DuLong, the priest identified Athanasie as Nipissing, possibly due to confusion between the Catfish clan and the Nipissing people, or because Athanasie's father may have been named Nipissing.

Her marriage, along with her kinship ties to Madjeckewiss, strengthened Cadot's standing as a trusted ally and influential figure among the Ojibwe and other Indigenous groups in the region. Historian Arthur Silver Morton described the union as follows:

Jean Baptiste Cadotte, interpreter to the late French garrison at the fort of the place... He was married to a Saulteur chief's daughter, a woman of uprightness, energy, and force of character, and through her he was able to play the part of marchant voyageur for the Indians of the lake.

== Pontiac's War ==
In the spring of 1763, Pontiac (Odawa, c. 1716–1769) led an uprising against the British in response to their treatment of Indigenous peoples.

During the following spring, Alexander Henry was at Michilimackinac with Wamatam. A group of Native Americans involved in Pontiac's uprising arrived on the island, seeking Ojibwe recruits and intending to kill Henry, who was the only Englishman there at the time. Henry requested Wamatam's protection and asked to be escorted to Sault Ste. Marie, where the Cadots could shelter him. Wamatam agreed, but three days into their journey his wife became ill, preventing him from continuing.

Fearing for his life, Henry spotted a canoe in the distance:

I therefore indulged the hope that it might be a Canadian canoe [rather than an Indian one] on its voyage to Montreal; and that I might be able to prevail upon the crew to take me with them and thus release me from all my troubles.

— Alexander Henry, Travels and Adventures in Canada and the Indian Territories, Between the Years 1760 and 1776, p. 161,

The canoe was carrying Athanasie, accompanied by three French Canadians. Henry asked her to escort him to Sault Ste. Marie, and she agreed. (Note: Henry does not mention that Athanasie was pregnant with Michel Cadotte at this time.)

On their journey, they were surrounded by about twenty Ojibwe canoes. One of the men accused Henry of being British, and others prepared to attack. According to Henry, Athanasie intervened:

[She] assured them that I was a Canadian whom she had brought on his first voyage from Montreal.

— Alexander Henry, Travels and Adventures in the Years 1760–1776, p. 164,

After her intervention, the group allowed them to pass without further incident. The next day they arrived safely at Sault Ste. Marie, where Henry was received by Jean-Baptiste Cadot.

== Move to Montreal and death ==
Around 1769, Athanasie Cadot traveled to Montreal to be with her children, who were attending school there. The family resided with the parents of Jean-Baptiste Cadot's business associate Maurice-Régis Blondeau. In 1775, they witnessed the Invasion of Quebec.

Cadot died in Montreal in 1776 and was buried at the chapel of Saint-Amable under the name Thérèse. Following her death, Jean-Baptiste Cadot later married a woman named Catherine.

== Role in the fur trade ==
Native American women played a significant role in the North American fur trade, particularly those who married fur traders. Athanasie Cadot was one such figure. She was prominent in the fur trade around the Great Lakes and was noted for her energetic and effective approach to business.

She traveled long distances by canoe, often accompanied by coureur des bois, to establish trade relations with other Indigenous communities. According to historian Brenda Child (Red Lake Ojibwe):

Her willingness to travel long distances accompanied primarily by French men bears out her reputation for independence.

Athanasie also contributed directly to her husband's success in the fur trade. She reportedly taught Jean-Baptiste Cadot to read and write in Ojibwe, as well as the customs and traditions of the Ojibwe. She provided knowledge about trade practices, managed household duties, and raised their children while Cadot was away.

She purchased trade goods for the family, as recorded in Jean-Baptiste Cadot's account book, which notes that she bought items such as clothing for her husband. Athanasie accompanied Cadot on long-distance trading trips and at times commanded some of his brigades.

Writer Walter O'Meara has suggested that Cadot's marriage to Athanasie may have influenced Alexander Henry's decision to form a partnership with him, due to her connections and influence among Indigenous communities.

== Personal life ==
=== Names ===
Members of the Ojibwe tribe, like those of many other Native American communities, often used multiple names over time and were flexible in adopting Christian names and surnames.

Athanasie Cadot's Ojibwe name was Equawaice. Variations of this name include Iquawanee and Equawanee. Her name is also recorded as Athanasia, and some scholars have spelled it as Anastasie. However, historian Theresa Schenck noted in 1987 that the priest consistently recorded her name as Athanasie. Her Christian names appear in various records as Marianne, Marie, Marie René[e], and Thérèse. Her granddaughter and husband referred to her as Astasie.

Pierre Gibault recorded the baptism of her son Joseph Cadotte, in which her name is listed as Marie Moüet. This has led some genealogists to mistakenly conclude that Athanasie had died by 1767 and that Jean-Baptiste Cadot had remarried into the Langlade family, which is not the case.

=== Religion ===
Athanasie Cadot was a practicing Catholic, though she also maintained associations with Ojibwe spiritual traditions.

== Legacy ==
Historian William Whipple Warren described Athanasie Cadot as:

A woman of great energy and force of character, as she is noted to this day for the influence she held over her relations—the principal chiefs of the tribe; and the hardy, fearless manner, in which, accompanied only by Canadian coureurs des bois to propel her canoes, she made long journeys to distant villages of her people to further the interests of her husband.

Athanasie Cadot also appears as a minor character in the historical fiction novel The White Islander by Mary Hartwell Catherwood.
