= Shadawish =

17th-18th century Ojibwe chief in Wisconsin

Shadawish was an Ojibwe chief during the 17th and 18th centuries.

In 1671 he was given a gold medal at Sault Ste-Marie by the French. He later moved his family to Wisconsin River becoming the first Ojibwe to settle in what is today Wisconsin.

== Biography ==
He was the son of Akeguiow. According to Dr DuLong, Ke-che-ne-zuh-yauh might have been the father of Akeguiow. Shadawish was the brother of Waubujejack.

According to William Warren, in 1671 the French gave him a gold medal at a convocation in Sault Ste-Marie.

Sometime before 1745, he led his extended family to the headwater of the Wisconsin River near Lac Vieux Desert, becoming the first Ojibwe to settle in Wisconsin. Under the leadership of the chief he settled his people at Turtle-Flambeau Flowage in 1745.

After the Ojibwe pushed the Meskwaki west, Shadawish's son Keesh-ke-mun took over his father's mission.

== Names ==
"Shadawish", also spelled She-da-wish or Sha-da-nish, means "Bad Pelican".
