= Andaigweos =

Andaigweos, also written as Ou-daig-weos (Note: The u in the spelling "Ou-daig-weos" may be due to confusion of the letters u and n, which can look similar in some handwriting.) and other variants of Ojibwe Aandeg-Wiiyaas (Crow Meat), was an Ojibwe leader who lived in the Zhaagawaamikong (Chequamegon) region in present-day Wisconsin on Lake Superior during the 18th century. Andaigweos was member of the Loon doodem. He was born on Madeline Island in the early 18th century. His father was from Canada (likely Sault Ste. Marie area) and moved to the western end of Lake Superior during the Ojibwe migrations of the 18th century. In his youth, the hereditary chiefs at Zhaagawaamikong were members of the Crane doodem. He was the grandfather of Chief Buffalo.
