= Jean-Baptiste Cadot =

Canadian fur trader

Jean Baptiste Cadot
- Born: December 5, 1723; Batiscan, Quebec
- Died: November 1, 1800 (aged 76); Sault Ste. Marie, Michigan, U.S.
- Other names: John Baptiste Cadotte; Ke-che-sub-ud-ese
- Spouse: Athanasie Cadot (m. 1756) Catherine Cadot (m. 1776)
- Children: 9, including Michel and Jean-Baptiste Jr.
- Family: Cadotte Family

Signature
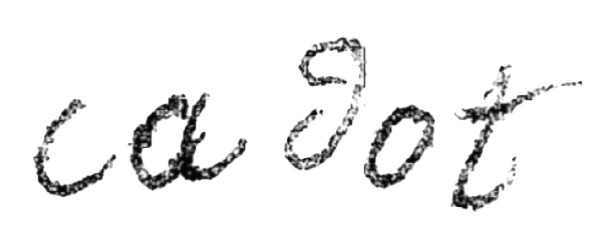

Jean-Baptiste Cadot (Note: The surname becomes Cadotte over time. For more information about this click here.)(December 5, 1723 – November 1, 1800), also referred to as Ke-che-sub-ud-ese, was a Métis voyageur and fur trader.

He joined in the North American fur trade when he was 18. After the birth of his daughter he married Athanasie Cadot under Catholic tradition.

During Pontiac's War he convinced the Ojibwe around Lake Superior not to join in the war. During the American Revolutionary War he worked for the British as an interpreter and helped recruit Ojibwe to fight in the Battle of St. Louis.

His death would ignite a controversy over the ownership of Sault Ste. Marie. His descendants would go on to be influential in the North American fur trade around Lake Superior. He would appear many times in popular culture in both Canada and the United States.

== Early life ==
Jean-Baptiste Cadot was born on December 5, 1723 in Batiscan, Québec. He was the son of Jean-Francois Cadot and Marie-Josephe Proteau. He was baptized on the day of his birth.

His grandfather Mathurin Cadot moved to New France from France. Cadot possessed Huron ancestry from his great-grandmother, Catherine Anenontha.

Many of his male relatives briefly engaged in the fur trade and used their profits to buy farm land. However, Cadot had little interest in farming, so in 1741 at age 18 he entered the fur trade as a voyageur, becoming an apprentice to Jean-Baptiste Nicolas Roch de Ramezay for a few years.

He was assigned to a post on Lake Nipigon. He managed to adjust to life in the wilderness when he took Athanasie Cadot to live with him.

== Settles at Sault Ste. Marie ==
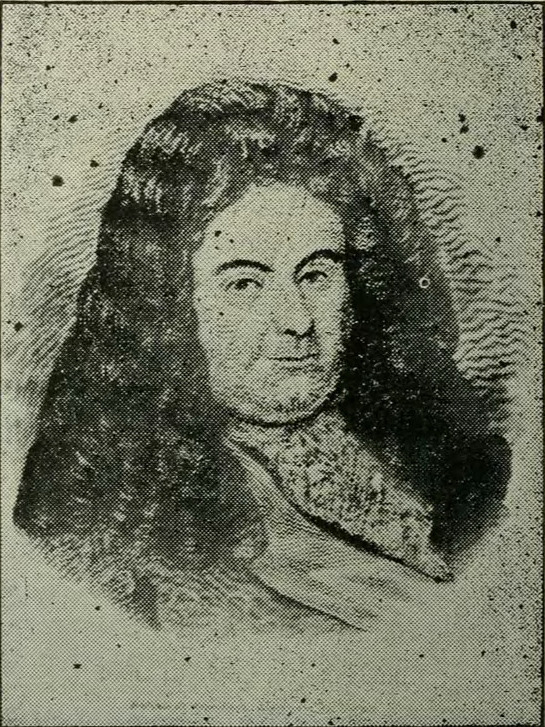
Louis Legardeur de Repentigny

In 1750 Cadot moved to Sault Ste. Marie. During the same year French officers Louis Legardeur de Repentigny and Louis de Bonne settled in the region to establish a fort and small farm, which would be a resting place for French travelers and fur traders.

The Frenchmen trusted Cadot to be their resident agent. Eventually Repentigny would leave Sault in 1755 for France. There are disagreements as to whether Cadot was left in charge of the land or Repentigny gave him the land.

== Seven Years' War ==
=== Interpreter for the french ===
He became an interpreter for the French at Sault Ste. Marie at the time of the British conquest in the Seven Years' War. Alexander Henry the elder met him and spent the winter of 1762-63 with him and Athanasie.

=== Pontiac's War ===
In the spring of 1763, Pontiac led an uprising against the British due to their mistreatment of the Natives. Cadot convinced the Ojibwe around Lake Superior to not join in Pontiac's War. According to Alexander Henry:

They [the Ojibwa] considered M. Cadotte as their chief; and he was not only my friend, but a friend to the English. It was by him that the Chippeways of Lake Superior were prevented from joining Pontiac.

— Alexander Henry, Alexander Henry's Travels and Adventures in the Years 1760-1776, 151

== American Revolution ==
In 1765, Henry and Cadot entered into a partnership. In 1767 Cadot and Henry re-founded the post at Michipicoten.

At the time of the American Revolution Cadot became an interpreter and operative for British Indian Department. Before the Revolutionary War he had already gained the trust of the British. In a letter of 1771 to Thomas Gage, George Turnbull noted Cadot's "universall good character amongst both Canadians and Indians." The same year, Sir William Johnson called him one of the "two Most faithful Men amongst the French."

In 1772, Cadot’s children were living with their mother in Montreal. In 1775 Cadot and Henry took £2,236 worth of goods from Montreal to the region of the new Hudson's Bay Company (HBC) post at Cumberland House, Saskatchewan. Cadot went to Fort des Prairies, while Henry went up the Sturgeon-Weir River.

In 1776, Henry and Cadot, along with Joseph Frobisher and Thomas Frobisher, travelled up the Sturgeon-Weir River from Cumberland House and established a fort at the river's outlet from Amisk Lake, called Fort Beaver Lake.

=== Battle of St. Louis ===
A 1780 letter written by Patrick Sinclair to the lieutenant governor and commander of Michilimackinac stated that the Indians viewed Cadot "as a great village orator." Because of this, Sinclair decided to dispatch Cadot that year to help recruit Ojibwe and other Native Americans near Lake Superior to help in the Battle of St. Louis. Cadot was not directly involved in the battle. Although the British lost the battle they continued to trust Cadot and his skills in dealing with the natives in the area.

=== 1783 mission ===
In 1783, Sinclair sent Cadot along with Madjeckewiss on a mission. They were tasked with stopping a war between the Ojibwe and the Dakota and Meskwaki.

== Later years ==
In 1786, Cadot largely retired from the fur trade. In 1796, he turned his property over to his sons Michel Cadotte and Jean Baptiste Cadotte Jr.

=== Death ===
On October 31, 1800, at Sault Ste. Marie, Cadot was on his deathbed surrounded by family, including his 13‑year‑old grandson Michel Cadotte Jr. and possibly Catherine and her children. Cadot told his relatives that the land through which the St. Mary's River ran belonged to them. He asked Michel Jr. to summon his sons Michel and Jean‑Baptiste Jr., both absent on trading trips, so he could "counsel them to try if possible to find his lost papers relative to the gift of the South side of the Sault Ste Marie duly made to him by the Chippewa Chiefs and Warriors." Cadot said the documents had disappeared or been taken and begged his family to go to Montreal to obtain them to prove his land ownership.

He died the next day, on November 1, 1800, at age 76. Although his death was previously believed to have occurred around 1803 to 1804, the testimony of Michel Cadotte Jr. later confirmed the 1800 date.

== Personal life ==
As of 2020, there is no known portrait of Cadot. But if he was like most French Canadian voyageurs, he would have been no taller than 5 feet and 8 inches. He was likely illiterate, but he was able to send his children to school and built a successful fur‑trading business. The Ojibwe referred to him as Ke‑che‑sub‑ud‑ese, possibly meaning "Great" or "Big Jean Baptiste", according to researcher John P. DuLong, or "Great Strong One", according to author Theresa Schenck.

After the birth of their daughter Marie Renée, Cadot and Athanasie traveled to Michilimackinac and were married at Sainte Anne Church on October 28, 1756. The wedding was performed by priest M. L. Le Franc. He had 5 children with Athanasie: Marie Renée (1756–1786), Charlotte (1759–1768). Jean-Baptiste Jr. (1761–1818), Michel (1764–1837), and Joseph (1767–1773). His wife’s familial connection with Madjeckewiss helped his reputation as a friend and influential figure among the Ojibwe and neighboring tribes. In May 1762, Alexander Henry began to live with Cadot and his family. Both Michel and Jean-Baptiste Jr. would later become influential traders around Lake Superior.

After 1776, Cadot would marry an Ojibwe woman named Catherine. Unlike Cadot's previous marriage, this marriage was not recognized by the Catholic Church. He would have four children with Catherine: Augustin (c. 1770–1825), Charlotte (c. 1779–1851), Joseph (c. 1778 – c. 1836), and Marie (c. 1791–1851).

== Legacy ==
=== Places named after him ===
The village of Codette in Canada is named in honor of Jean-Baptiste Cadot. The town gained its name in 1924 after the Canadian Pacific Railway bought the townsite. In a meeting it was decided to name the village "Cadotte Station" after Jean-Baptiste Cadot, but using the variant spelling "Cadotte" that had become standard in the nineteenth century. However the paperwork to incorporate the town misspelled his name, resulting in the town’s current name. Back then it was believed that Cadot drowned in the river near the town.

According to author Frank O’Brian, a street on Mackinac Island called Cadotte Avenue is named after the fur trader.

=== In popular culture ===
Louis-Honore Fréchette wrote a poem titled "Le drapeau Fantôme", in which Cadot dies defending the fort at Sault Ste. Marie against the English with the flag of France wrapped around him. In reality Cadot collaborated with the British and he died long after the British conquered Canada.

The website for Algoma School District has a song about Cadot.

Jean-Baptiste Cadot is a character in numerous historical fictional novels, including:

- Adventure Westward by Eric Acland.
- Michilimackinac: A Tale of the Straits by David A. Turrill.
- The Conquerors: A Narrative by Allan W. Eckert.
- My Heart Belongs on Mackinac Island by Carrie Fancett Pagels.
- The White Islander by Mary Hartwell Catherwood.
