= Cadot =

Cadot is a surname. Notable people with the surname include:

- Albert Cadot (1901–1972), French sailor
- J. R. Cadot (born 1987), Bahamian basketball player
- Jérémy Cadot (born 1986), French fencer
- Laurent Cadot (born 1983), French rower

== See also ==
- Gadot (surname)
