= Madeline Island Marathon =

Annual road running competition in La Pointe, Wisconsin, U.S.

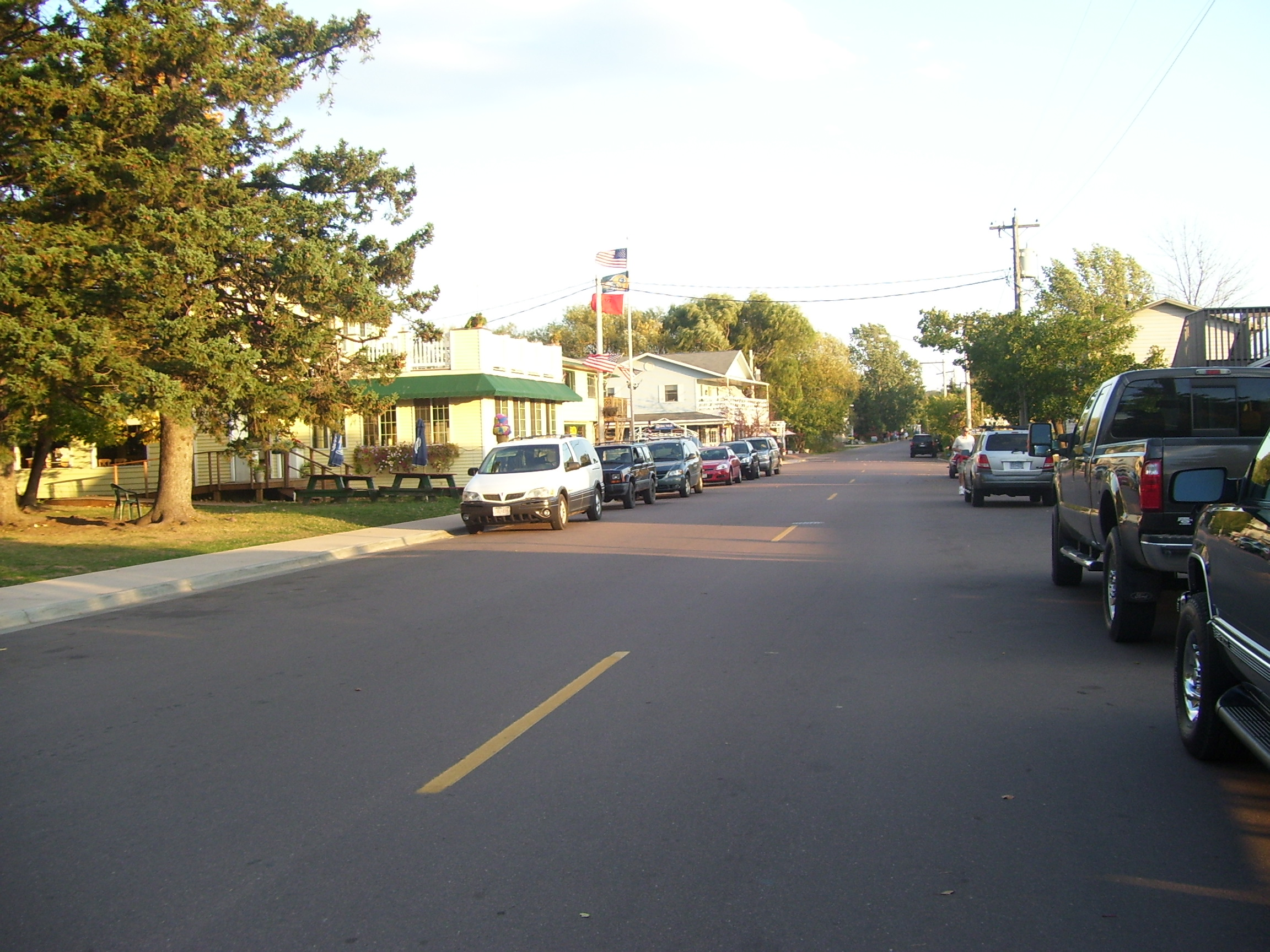
Main Street, downtown LaPointe, on Madeline Island.

The Madeline Island Marathon and Half Marathon is an annual road running competition held in May at La Pointe, Wisconsin, located on Madeline Island, United States. The course runs point-to-point, with out-and-back portions. The course follows a scenic route, which is mostly paved, but also includes sections of gravel road. The route features scenic woodlands and Lake Superior views, in a rural setting. Joni's Beach on Madeline Island serves as the starting and ending point.

The Madeline Island Marathon is USATF certified. Certification numbers are:

- Marathon #WI17014DM
- Half Marathon #WI17013DM

The 2020 running was canceled due to the COVID-19 pandemic.

== Course records ==
The male record time for the 2017 Madeline Island Marathon is 2:53:47, set by St. Paul, Minnesota runner Andrew Kromroy. The female record time for the 2017 Madeline Island Marathon is 3:12:20, set by Encinitas, California runner Stephanie Berger-Mckenna.

The male record time for the 2017 Madeline Island Half Marathon is 1:24:02, set by Washburn, Wisconsin runner Blaise Sopiwnik. The female record time for the 2017 Madeline Island Half Marathon is 1:35:47, set by Lake Elmo, Minnesota runner Ann Smith.
