= Anishinaabe clan system =

Kinship system of indigenous peoples of North America

The Anishinaabe, like most Algonquian-speaking groups in North America, base their system of kinship on clans or totems. The Ojibwe word for clan (doodem) was borrowed into English as totem. The clans, based mainly on animals, were instrumental in traditional occupations, intertribal relations, and marriages. Today, the clan remains an important part of Anishinaabe identity. Each clan is forbidden from harming its representation animal by any means, as it is a bad omen to do so.

== Tradition ==
The Anishinaabe peoples are divided into a number of doodeman, or clans, (singular: doodem) named mainly for animal totems (or doodem, as an Ojibwe person would say this word in English). In Anishinaabemowin, ode' means heart. Doodem or clan literally translates as 'the expression of, or having to do with one's heart'; in other words, doodem refers to the extended family. According to written / oral tradition, the Anishinaabeg spanned the North Eastern Woodlands of Turtle Island (North America). The origins of the Clans were given to the Getay-Anishinaabeg after the cleansing of the Earth by water, as the memory of people had been wiped clean. Anishinaabe Doodeman are the social fabric context for politics, kinship, and identity of the Anishinaabeg peoples.

The people established "a framework of social organization to give them strength and order" in which each totem represents a core branch of knowledge and responsibility essential to society. Today, seven general totems compose this framework. The crane and the loon are the leadership, responsible for over-seeing and leading the people. The fish are the scholars and mediators and are responsible for solving disputes between the crane and the loon. The bear are both police and medicine gatherers. The martens are hunters but warriors as well. The moose are mediators and exemplify peace. Clans are both a means of acquiring and retaining knowledge for the Anishinawbeg. Knowledge gained through experience and interactions with the natural world and other clan members is passed down and built upon through generations.

Traditionally, each band had democratic, independent councils consisting of leaders of the communities (Families / clans or odoodeman), with the group often identified by the principal doodem. In meeting others, the traditional greeting among the Ojibwe peoples is "What is your doodem?" ("Aaniin odoodemaayan?") in order to establish a social conduct between the two meeting parties as family. Marriage among members of the same clan is forbidden.

== Etymology ==
The word odoodem is a dependent noun. When speaking of one's own doodem, the Anishinaabe would say nindoodem(-ag) ('my clan(s)'), gidoodem(-ag) ('your clan(s)') for addressees and odoodeman ('his/her clan(s)') for others.

== Pedagogy ==
The clan system is an integral part of acquiring and retaining knowledge for the Anishinaabe. Each clan contributes a key element to the society and individual members contribute to a clan’s knowledge through experience. During a clan member’s lifetime, they are able to gain knowledge known by the clan; emphasis is placed on personal experience, rather than a strict student-teacher relationship. Although members learn through relationships with other clan members, it is the experience gained as a result of these relationships that allows them to attain knowledge. Throughout a clan member’s life, knowledge they gain that was previously unknown to the clan is added to the clan’s collective knowledge. This knowledge is then passed down to future generations, contributing to the "flow of Nebwakawin (wisdom) that passes from generation to generation".

Despite pressure from the colonial society in Canada and the United States, much Anishinaabe knowledge has survived and continues to be shared and built upon. Alexander Wolfe's Earth Elder 18 Stories: The Pinayzitt Path, Dr. Dan Musqua's The Seven Fires: Teachings of the Bear Clan, and Edward Benton-Banai's The Mishomis Book: The Voice of the Ojibway are a few notable works of Anishinaabe literature. These publications are important carriers of knowledge that pass from the ancestors to future generations.

== Clan totems ==
There were at least twenty-one Ojibwe totems in all, recorded by William Whipple Warren. Other recorders, such as John Tanner, list many fewer but with different doodem types. For the Potawatomi, at least 15 different totems were recorded. The clan types today are quite extensive, but usually only a handful of odoodeman are found in each of the Anishinaabe communities. Like any other All Anishinawbeg speaking peoples, the Anishinawbeg clan system served as a system of social weave as well as a means of dividing labour. The clan groups or phratries are listed below, listing each of the doodem clans or gentes within their group. The known Anishinawbeg clans are listed below.

=== Bimaawidaasi group ===
The Bimaawidaasi group was charged with scouting, hunting and gathering.

- "Hooves" subdivision:
  - Moozwaanowe ("little" moose-tail)
  - Moozens or Moozoons or Moozonii (little moose)
  - Mooz (moose)
  - Adik (caribou)— The Adik totem is common among the Ojibwa and north of Lake Superior. A prominent family from this doodem from the Grand Portage area relocated to La Pointe and produced the chiefs Mamongazeda and Waubojeeg. Later members of this branch became leaders at Sault Ste. Marie.
  - Waawaashkeshi (deer)
  - Mishewe (elk)
    - Omashkooz (stag)
    - Eshkan (antler)
  - Bizhiki (buffalo)
- "Little Paws" subdivision:
  - Waabizheshi (Marten)
    This pictographic 1849 petition shows an Ojibwa chief represented by the Marten doodem.
  - Amik(waa) (beaver)
  - Wazhashk (muskrat)
  - Gaag (porcupine)
  - Esiban (raccoon)
  - Waabooz(oo) (rabbit)
  - Zhaangweshi (mink)
  - Waagoshiinh (fox)
  - Zhigaag (skunk)
  - Asanagoo (squirrel)

=== Giishkizhigwan group ===
The Giishkizhigwan group was charged with teaching and healing.

- Giigoonh or Namens (fish)
  - Wawaazisii or Owaazisii (bullhead)
  - Maanameg (catfish)
  - Adikameg (whitefish)
  - Namebin(aa) (sucker)
  - Name or Maame (sturgeon)
  - Ginoozhe (pike)
- Mikinaak (snapping turtle)
  - Mishiikenh (mud turtle)
  - Miskwaadesi (painted turtle)
- Ginebig (snake)
  - Omazaandamo (black snake)
  - Midewewe or Ozhiishiigwe (rattlesnake), or Zhiishiigwaan (rattle)
- Omakakii (frog)
- Nigig (otter)
- Nibiinaabe (merman)
- Ashaageshiinh (crab)

=== Nooke group ===
The Nooke group was responsible for defense and healing. Though today the Bear Clan has all merged into a single clan known as Nooke, at one time the Bear was the largest — so large, in fact, that it was sub-divided into body parts such as the head (Makoshtigwaan or 'bear-skull'), the ribs and the feet (Nookezid or 'tender-foot'), as well as different types of bears such as the Waabishki-makwa or 'white black bear' and the Mishimakwa or 'grizzly bear'.

- Makwa (bear)
  - Makoshtigwaan (bear skull)
  - Nookezid (tender-foot)
  - Makokon (bear's liver)
  - Miskwaa'aa (blood)
  - Waabishki-makwa (white black bear)
  - Mishimakwa (grizzly bear)
- Bizhiw (lynx)
- Ma'iingan or Mawii'aa (wolf)

=== Baswenaazhi group ===
The Baswenaazhi group were traditionally charged with outgoing International communications. Because of this, often members of the Baswenaazhi group are said to be the most vocal.

- Binesi (thunderbird)
  - Ajijaak (crane or "thunder")
    - Nesawaakwaad ("forked tree")
  - Ashagi (heron)
  - Gekek (hawk)
  - Omigizi(we) (bald eagle)
    - Mitigomizh (white oak)
    - Wiigwaas (birch bark)
  - Giniw (golden eagle)
  - Bibiigiwizens (sparrowhawk)
  - Makade-gekek(we) (black hawk)

=== Bemaangik group ===
The Bemaangik are charged with internal/domestic communications. They were often charged with the community's own council fires and facilitating dialogue on all internal/domestic issues.

- Bineshiinh (bird)
  - Aan'aawenh (Note: Also Ahahweh, A-auh-wauh, Aauhwauh, Aa'aawenh or Aa'aawe.) (pintail) (Oj)
  - Owewe (wild goose or "swan")
  - Bine (partridge or "turkey") or Aagask (grouse) (Oj, Po)
  - Nika (goose) (Ms, Oj)
  - Maang (loon) (Al, Oj, Od, Po)
  - (Makade)Zhiishiib ((black) duck) (Oj)
  - Gayaashk (gull) (Oj, Od)
  - Jiwiiskwiiskiwe (snipe) (Oj)
  - Omooshka'oozi (bittern) (Oj)
  - Zhedeg (pelican)
  - Ogiishkimanisii (kingfisher) (Al, Oj)
  - Aandeg (crow) (Po)
  - Gaagaagishiinh (raven)
  - Omiimii (pigeon) (Ms)
  - Apishi-gaagaagi (magpie) (Ms)

=== Metaphors ===
On occasion, instead of referring to the totem by the actual being's name, a clan is identified instead by a metaphor describing the characteristic of the clan's totem. The metaphors that survive today include:

- Bimaawidaasi 'carrier' = Amik(we) 'beaver'
- Giishkizhigwan 'cut-tail' = Maanameg 'catfish'
- Nooke 'tender' = Makwa 'bear'
- Baswenaazhi 'echo-maker' = Ajijaak(we) 'crane'
- Bemaangik 'pass-by sounder' = Owewe 'wild goose'

== Social order ==
Some national sub-divisions were simply referred to by their major clan component. An example of this would be the Maandawe-doodem ('Fisher-clan') of the Meshkwahkihaki peoples who live along the south shore of Lake Superior. Further inland from the Maandawe-doodem were the Waagosh-doodem ('Fox clan') of the Meshkwahkihaki (Meskwaki). When the Maandawe were defeated in a major battle between the Ojibwe and the Meshkwahkihaki peoples, the surviving Maandawe were adopted as part of the Ojibwa nation, but instead as the Waabizheshi-doodem ('Marten clan'). Among some of the Ojibwe people, the Waabizheshi clan is also used to denote a form of adoption, i.e., a non-native father and Ojibwe mother. In other instances, for example odoodem communities such as the Amikwaa, they were treated as fully interdependent Nations of the Anishinaabeg Confederacy, or given a designation to represent their primary function in the social order, as with the Manoominikeshiinyag ('Ricing-rails') or the Waawaashkeshi-ininiwag ('Deer[-clan] People').

Some doodem indicate non-Ojibwe origins. Other than Waabizheshi, these include the Ogiishkimanisii-doodem (Kingfisher Clan) and Ma'iingan-doodem (Wolf Clan) for Dakota and Migizi-doodem (Eagle Clan) for Americans. There are other odoodem considered rare today among the Ojibwa because the odoodem have migrated into other tribes, such as the Nibiinaabe-doodem (Merman Clan), which shows up as the Water-spirits Clan of the Winnebagoes.

== Kinship ==
The Ojibwa understanding of kinship is complex, taking into account not only the immediate family but also the extended family. It is considered a modified Bifurcate merging (Iroquois) kinship system. Consequently, the Ojibwa would speak not only of one's grandfather (nimishoomis) and grandmother (nookomis), father (noos) and mother (ningashi), or son (ningozis) and daughter (nindaanis), but also would speak of elder brother (nisayenh), younger sibling (nishiimenh), cross-uncle (nizhishenh), parallel-aunt (ninooshenh), male sibling of same gender (niikaanis), female sibling of same gender (niidigikoonh) and sibling of opposite gender (nindawemaa), and cross-cousin of the opposite gender (niinimoshenh), to name only a few.

Siblings generally share the same term with parallel-cousins as with any Bifurcate merging kinship system due to being members of the same doodem, but the modified system allows for a younger sibling to share the same kinship term with younger cross-cousins (nishiimenh). In addition, the complexity wanes as one goes away from the speaker's immediate generation, with some degree of complexity retained with female relatives (for example, ninooshenh is 'my mother's sister' or 'my father's sister-in-law'—i.e., my parallel-aunt—but also 'my parent's female cross-cousin'). The Ojibwa collectively call both the great-grandparents' and older generations and the great-grandchildren's and younger generations aanikoobijigan. This sign of kinship/clans speaks of the very nature of the Anishinaabe's entire philosophy/lifestyle, that is of interconnectedness and balance between all living generations and all generations of the past and of the future.

In addition to the Anishinaabeg doodem, clans of other tribes are considered related to the Anishinaabe clans if they have the same designation. Consequently, for example, a union between an Anishinaabe Bear Clan member with a Cherokee Bear Clan member would be considered illegal — even incestuous — by many traditional community groups.

Graphic of the Iroquois kinship system

== Notable ==
=== White crane ===
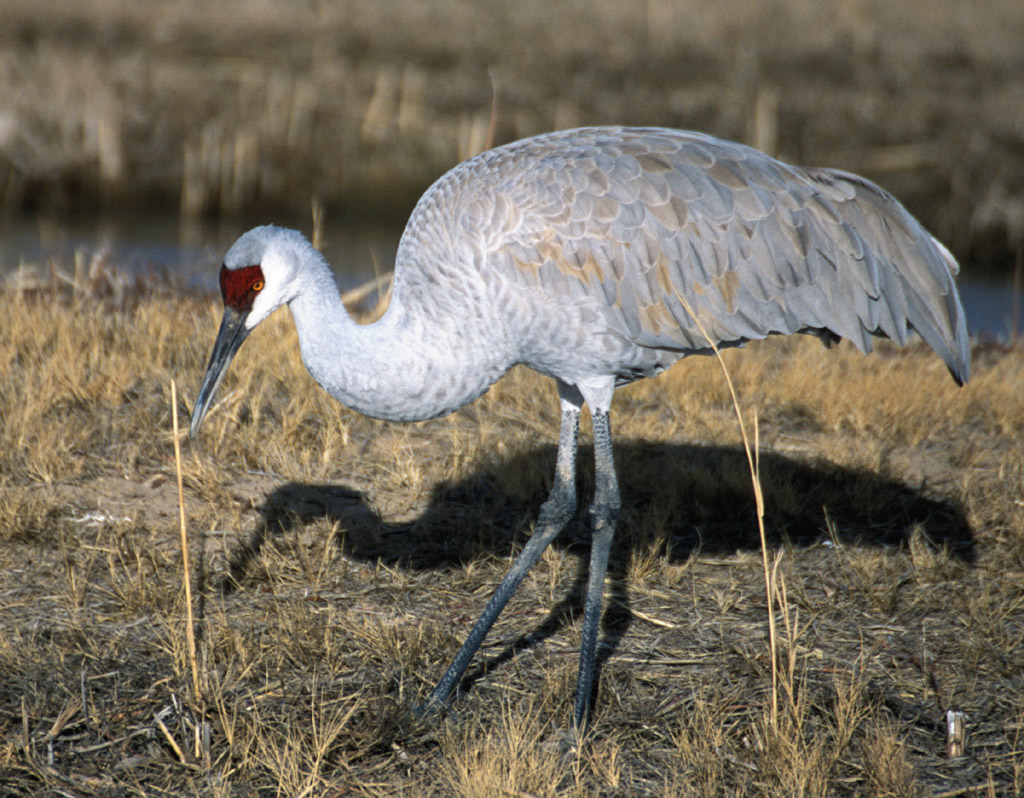

The white crane clan were the traditional hereditary chiefs of the Ojibwe at Sault Ste. Marie and Madeline Island, and were some of the more powerful chiefs encountered by the first French explorers of Lake Superior. Members of the crane clan include:

- Tagwagane – an important chief at Madeline Island in the early 19th century
- Ikwesewe – the wife of Michel Cadotte and the namesake of Madeline Island

=== Loon ===
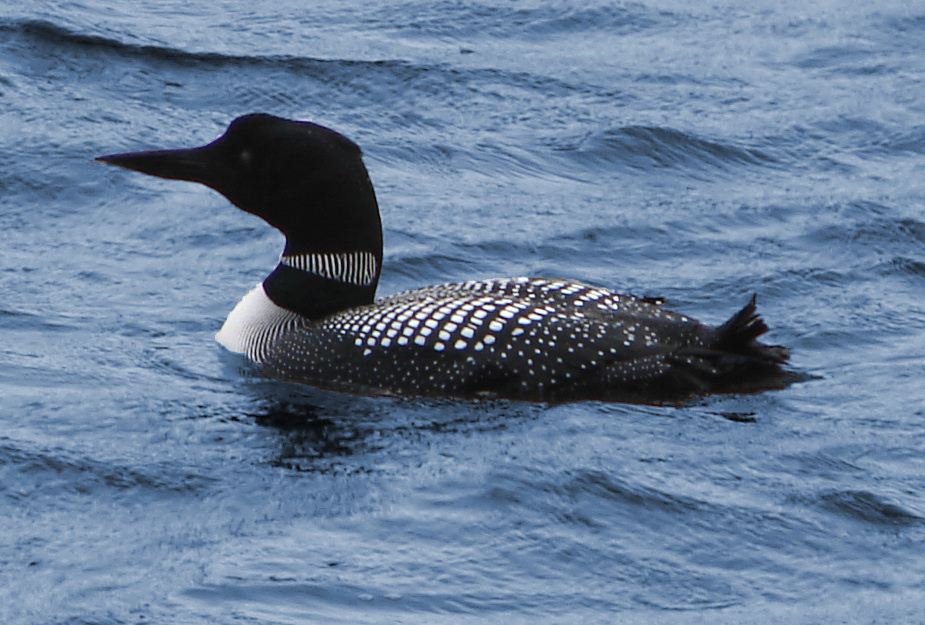

Closely associated with the crane clan, members of the loon clan became important chiefs on Lake Superior's south shore during the fur trade period. Members of the loon clan include:

- Chief Buffalo – a famous chief of Madeline Island
- Walter Bresette – a Red Cliff Ojibwe activist

=== Bear ===
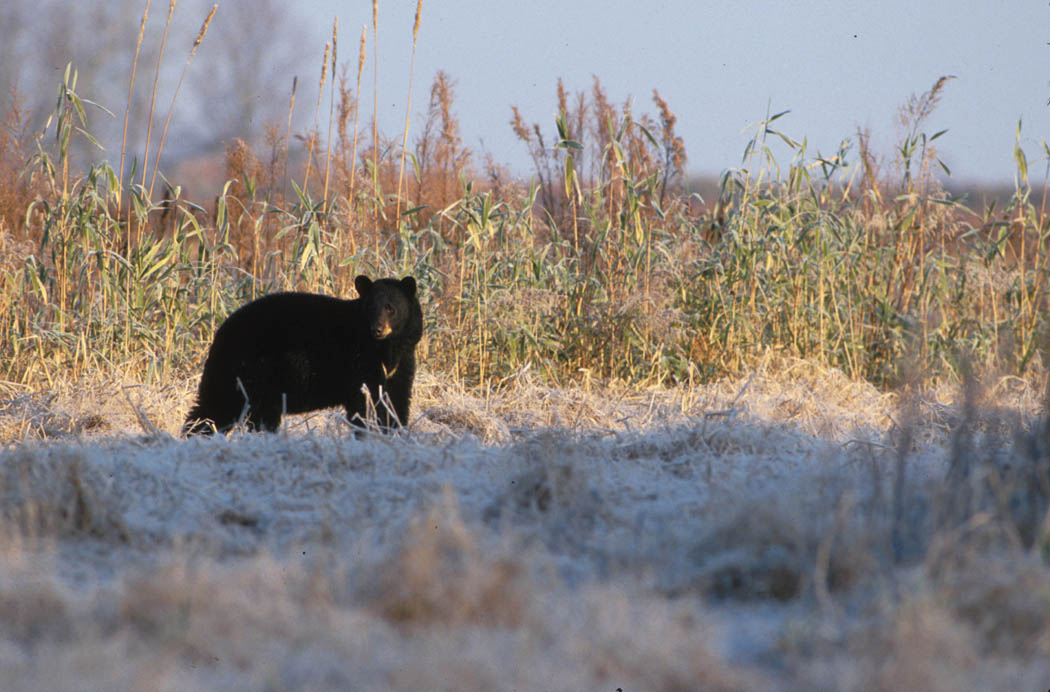

Always the most numerous of the Anishinaabeg, members of the bear clan were traditionally the warriors and police (Ogichidaa), as well as the healers. Many members of the clan continue in these roles today. The bear clan provided most of those who participated in the Bad River Train Blockade. In fiction, the police officers in the novels of Louise Erdrich come from the bear clan.

=== Eagle ===
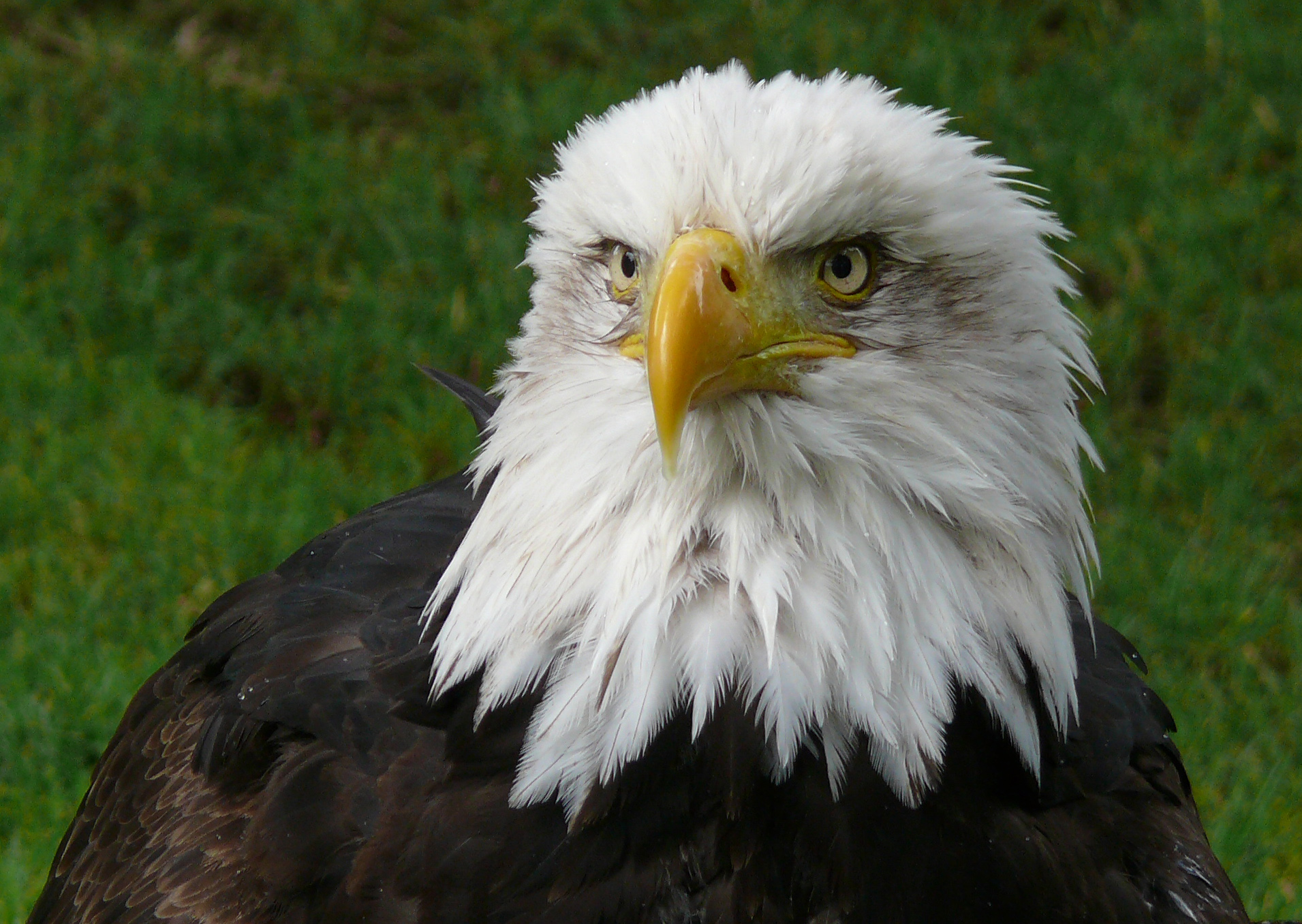

Now one of the most common clans, the eagle totem was once of the smaller clans. The number of eagle totem members grew when new members whose paternal ancestors were Americans were assigned to this totem. Since the first sustained contact by the Anishinaabe with the United States was through government officials, the symbol of the American eagle was taken for a clan marker. Members of the Eagle clan include:

- William Whipple Warren – a 19th-century Ojibwe historian
- Nahnebahwequa – Mississauga Ojibway missionary and spokeswoman
- Kahkewaquonaby – Mississauga Ojibway Methodist missionary and spokesman
- Anton Treuer – Leech Lake Band Ojibwe historian and language activist
