= Chippewa River =

Chippewa River may refer to:

- Chippewa River (Michigan)
- Chippewa River (Minnesota)
- Chippewa River (Wisconsin)
- Chippewa River (Ontario)
