= Mamongazeda =

Mamongazeda ([Have Very] Big Foot)
- Ojibwa/Chippewa chief
- Successor: Waubojeeg
- Born: Shagawamikong

Ma-mong-a-ze-da (Ojibwe: Mamaangĕzide "[Have Very] Big Foot") was an 18th-century Ojibwa chief from Shagawamikong. He was a member of the Adik (caribou) doodem and his ancestors came from Grand Portage on the north shore of Lake Superior. His father was his mother's second husband as she had been married to a chief of the Dakota people previously during a period of peace between the Ojibwa and Dakota. When war resumed the couple was obliged to divorce with the husband and children joining the Dakota and the wife marrying an Ojibwa man. In this way, Mamongazeda's older half-brother Wapasha became a chief of the Dakota while he became a chief of the Ojibwa. In addition to being an accomplished war leader, Mamongazeda was persuasive diplomat and strong ally of the French. During the French and Indian War, Mamongazeda raised a party of Lake Superior Ojibwa to fight with the French, and were part of Montcalm's army at the Battle of the Plains of Abraham. He lived to a very old age and was succeeded by his son, the famous chief and warrior, Waubojeeg.
