= Albert Cadot =

French sailor

Personal information
- Full name: Albert Octave Cadot
- Nationality: French
- Born: 6 July 1901
- Died: 9 April 1972 (aged 70)

Sport
- Sport: Sailing

Albert Octave Cadot (6 July 1901 – 9 April 1972) was a French sailor. He competed at the 1948 Summer Olympics and the 1956 Summer Olympics.
