= Tagwagane =

Chief Tagwagané (Ojibwe: Dagwagaane, "Two Lodges Meet") (c. 1780–1850) was an Anishinaabe (Ojibwa) sub-chief of the La Pointe Band of Lake Superior Chippewa, located in the Chequamegon area in the first half of the 19th century. He was of the Ajijaak-doodem (Crane Clan). His village was often located along Bay City Creek (Naadoobiikaag-ziibiwishenh: "creek for collecting water") within the city limits of what now is Ashland, Wisconsin.

During the signing of the 1842 Treaty of La Pointe, Father Chrysostom Verwyst, according to the Wisconsin Historical Society, was informed by Chief Tagwagané of a copper plate his family used for time reckoning. With each passing generation, Tagwagané's ancestors had made a notch in the plate. Based on the description Verwyst gave, William Whipple Warren concluded that Chief Tagwagané's ancestors first arrived in the Chequamegon Bay area sometime around 1490.
