= Michel Cadotte =

Métis fur trader (1764–1837)

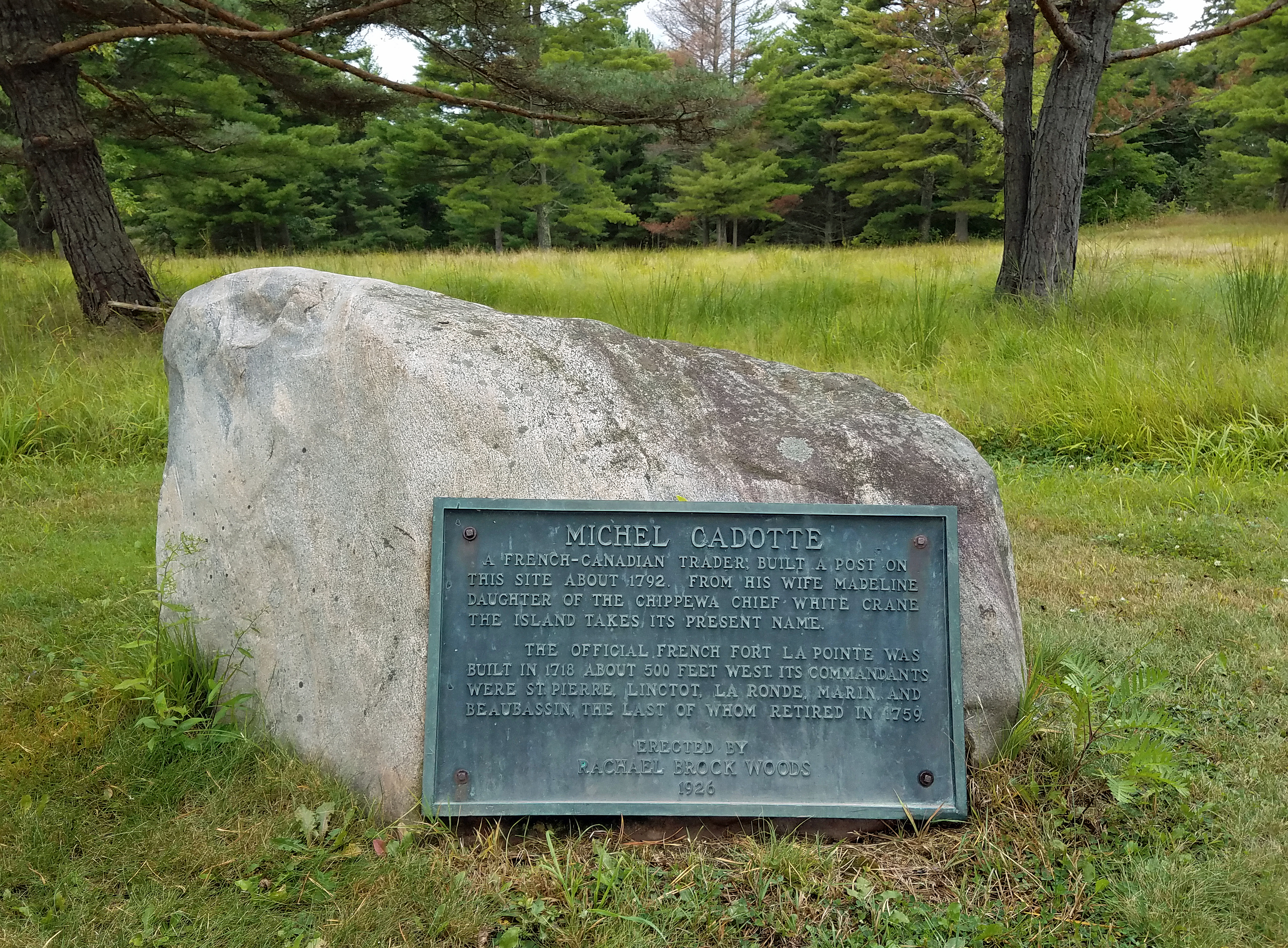
- Historical marker commemorating Cadotte at Winston-Cadotte Site, Old Fort, Wisconsin
- Born: July 22, 1764; Sault Ste. Marie, Michigan
- Died: July 8, 1837 (aged 72)
- Spouse: Madeline Cadotte
- Parents: Jean-Baptiste Cadot (father); Athanasie Cadot (mother)
- Relatives: Jean-Baptiste Cadotte Jr. (brother) Kechewaishke (cousin)
- Family: Cadotte Family

Michel Cadotte (Note: also spelled Michael, and the surname as Cadott, Cadeau, and other variations) (July 22, 1764 – July 8, 1837), Kechemeshane in Ojibwe, (Note: Gichi-miishen in the contemporary spelling, meaning "Great Michel") was a Métis fur trader of Ojibwe, Wendat and French-Canadian descent. He dominated the business in the area of the south shore of Lake Superior.

He gained a strategic alliance through marriage to Ikwesewe (also spelled Equawasay), the daughter of the head of the White Crane clan; men from this clan were the hereditary chiefs of the Lake Superior Ojibwe. Cadotte's trading post at La Pointe on Madeline Island was a critical center for the trade between the Lake Superior band and the British and United States trading companies.

== Early life and education ==
Cadotte was born July 22, 1764, as the second son to a his father and an Anishinaabe mother in present-day Sault Ste. Marie, Michigan, which had been recently taken over by the British after their victory against France in the Seven Years' War. He had an older brother and they grew up with their mother's Ojibwe people. His father Jean Baptiste Cadotte Sr., became a fur trader for French and later British interests in and around the eastern end of Lake Superior. Michel's paternal great-grandfather was a Frenchman named Mathurin Cadeau, and he had come to Lake Superior in the late 17th century on a French exploratory mission.

He would be baptized at Michilimackinac on 31 August 1764. Kechewaishke was his cousin.

Michel's mother was a member of the powerful Owaazsii (Bullhead) clan of the Anishinaabeg. She is frequently described in historic records as having high status in the region and as being an exceptionally kind person. She was a Roman Catholic convert whose French name was likely Marianne or Anastasia. His parents sent Michel and his brother John Baptiste Jr. to Montreal for their education in French Catholic schools.

Cadotte Sr. pressed westward as a trader along the south shore of Lake Superior and set up a trading post on Mooningwanekaaning (Madeline Island), in Chequamegon Bay in modern-day Wisconsin. The traditional center of the Lake Superior Ojibwe, the island had previously had a French trading post. As Michel Cadotte reached adulthood, he frequently traveled west with his father and older brother Jean Baptiste Jr. (more often called John Baptiste Cadotte).

Jean Baptiste Sr. retired in 1796 and left his holdings to his sons. John Baptiste Jr. explored westward to Fond du Lac and later to Red Lake in present-day Minnesota. Michel Cadotte settled at La Pointe on Mooningwanekaaning, then called St. Michel Island.

== Ojibwe wedding ==
According to Dr John P. DuLong, Madeline and Michel got married according to Ojibwe tradition around 1786 on Namekagon River.

Not much is known about how and when the wedding took place; there is no written record of when this marriage was recognized by their Ojibwe family. All of this is due to the Ojibwe tradition of documenting important events orally rather than writing them down. (Note: When Madeline was interviewed by her grandson William Warren, there was no mention of this marriage.)

According to Silbernagel, it's likely that Michel offered a gift to Madeline's father in order to win his approval.

== Career ==
Working for the British North West Company and later the American Fur Company, Cadotte built a trading empire throughout northern Wisconsin. He established outposts at the head of the Chippewa River, and at Lac Courte Oreilles. Born just after the collapse of New France after Great Britain's victory in the Seven Years' War, Cadotte had a career that peaked toward the later decades of the great fur trade. Many Métis traders, similar to him, were prominent in the Great Lakes area on behalf of British and American companies.

Cadotte and his brother Jean Baptiste were generous and well-liked; they proved instrumental in brokering peace and commerce in the region. Literate and able to speak fluent Ojibwe, English, and French, Cadotte often acted as an intermediary between the Ojibwe and the governments of Canada and the United States. He held considerable political influence; for example, he persuaded most of the Lake Superior Ojibwe to stay out of Tecumseh's Rebellion.

== Catholic Marriage ==
Madeline and Michel Cadotte would marry in the catholic tradition on July 26, 1830, at St. Anne's Church on Mackinac Island.

There were numerous reasons for why the couple decided to marry a second time decades after their first marriage. Powerful courts cases were changing how marriages between European men and native American women were perceived by the law, treaties had a big impact on mixed race couples, and Protestant missionaries were arriving in the region.

The wedding was performed by Father Jean Dejean. The witnesses to the wedding include William McGulpin, Alexis Corbin, and Alexis Corbin Jr. Cadotte's children would also be present at the wedding.

During this time they would gain a marriage license from the county clerk at Mackinac Island so their marriage would be recognized by the United States Government.

== Later years and death ==
Cadotte retired in 1823 and left his business to his two American sons-in-law, the brothers Lyman and Truman Warren. He died on July 8, 1837, and was buried at La Pointe.

== Legacy and honors ==
- Mooningwanekaaning Island, designated Île St. Michel by the French in the 17th century, became more widely known as Michael's Island, after Cadotte, during the 19th and into the early 20th century.
- Since then, the island has become associated with his wife Ikwesewe, who lived into her nineties. Her Catholic saint's name was Madeline, for whom the island is named.
- Cadott, Wisconsin in Chippewa County was named for him.
- One of the grandsons of the Cadottes, William Whipple Warren, was also born in La Pointe. A native speaker of Ojibwe, he was elected as a legislator from Minnesota Territory in 1851. He wrote the first history of the Ojibwe people, combining oral traditions and European-American style of documentation. It was published in 1885 and reprinted in 2009.
- The Cadottes have numerous living descendants throughout Ojibwe Country, especially in the Red Cliff area.

Michel Cadotte's grandson William Warren said this about his grandfather:

full of courage and untiring enterprise

and:

unbounded charitable disposition

Former Wisconsin senator William Vilas stated this in a 1908 court case in Ashland, Wisconsin, Cadotte was:

[a] great historic character of the Lake Superior region. Cadotte was not a warrior, nor a statesman . . . but he was a big man, trusted alike by the Indians and the white men, and a man of integrity.

== See also ==
- Chief Buffalo
- Charles Michel de Langlade
- Pierre Grignon
- Alexander Henry the elder
