= Matchekewis =

Ojibwe war chief

Matchekewis (c.1735 – July 1805), also known as Madjeckewiss, Mash-i-pi-nash-i-wish or Bad Bird, was a respected Ojibwe war chief in present-day northern Michigan. He became famous for his role in the 1763 capture of Fort Michilimackinac from the British during Pontiac's War. However, he subsequently became a staunch ally of Great Britain throughout the American Revolutionary War.

== Early life ==
He was probably born in the year 1735. He was born in hunt villages west of Lake Huron. He was called Kaigwiaidosa as a young man.

== Military career ==
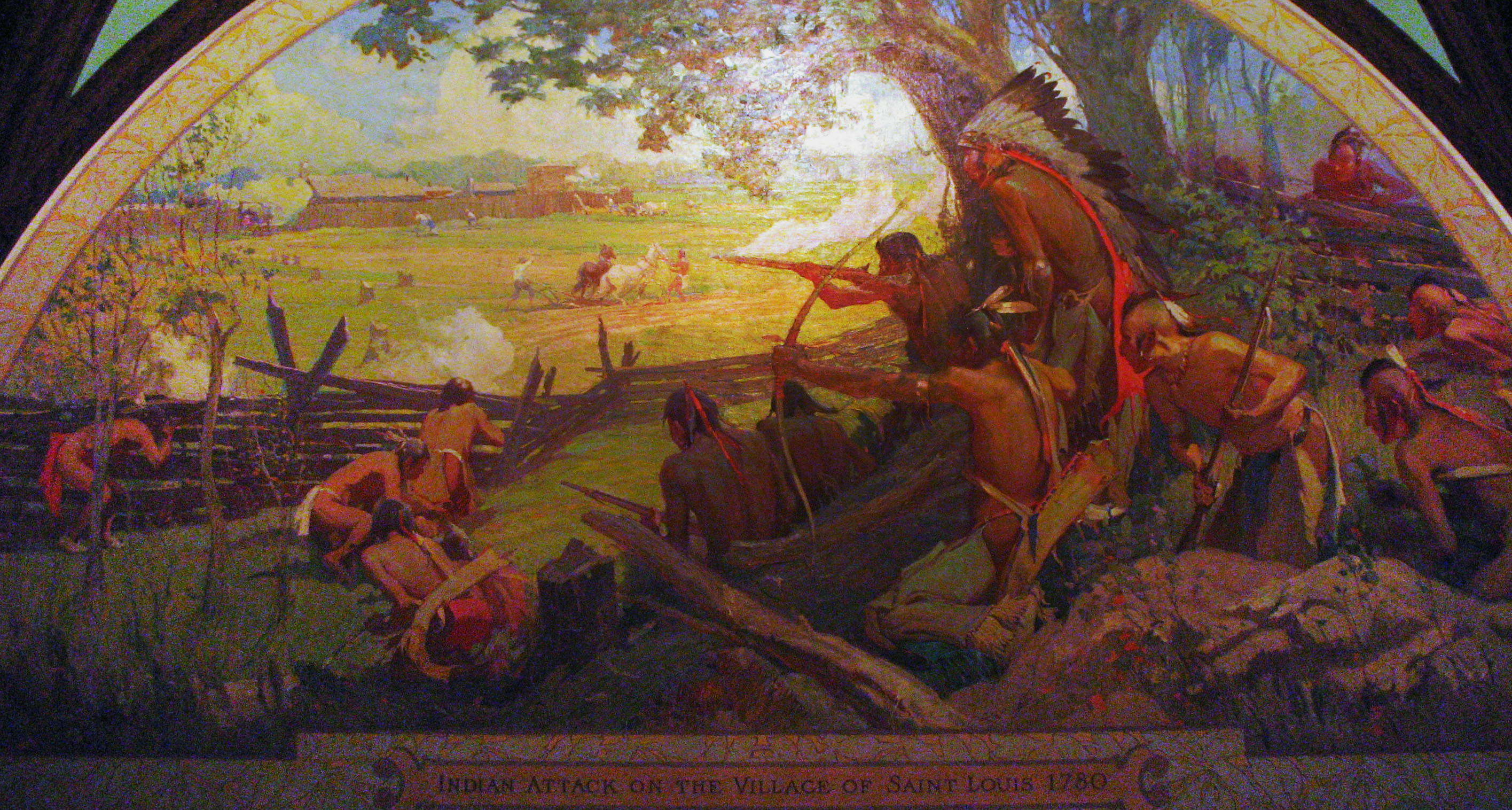
Battle of St. Louis

In 1763, he took part in Pontiac's Rebellion in the capture of Fort Michilimackinac from the British. But in 1780 he commanded his tribes in the American Revolutionary War as an ally of Great Britain against Spain. At the Battle of St. Louis, in charge of all of the native American troops, he was defeated by the Spanish gunpowder weapons. After the war, he signed the Treaty of Greenville with the young United States, ceding Bois Blanc Island in Lake Huron, in addition to all of his original lands, to the United States.
