= Keesh-ke-mun =

Ojibwe chief (died 1820s)

- Died: 1827 or 1828
- Children: Esther Cadotte; Mozobodo
- Father: Shadawish

Keesh-ke-mun was an Ojibwe chief during the 18th and 19th centuries who led the Lac du Flambeau Band of Lake Superior Chippewa to Lac du Flambeau, Wisconsin.

== Early life and family ==
Keesh-ke-mun was the son of Shadawish. Shadawish led his extended family to the headwater of the Wisconsin River near Lac Vieux Desert. Under the leadership of Shadawish he settled his people at Turtle-Flambeau Flowage in 1745.

After the Ojibwe pushed the Meskwaki west, Keesh-ke-mun took over his father's mission. Also during 1745, Keesh-ke-mun led the Lac du Flambeau Band of Lake Superior Chippewa to the area of Lac du Flambeau, Wisconsin.

== Later years and death ==
Thomas L. McKenney meet Keesh-ke-num and his wife in 1826 at the mouth of the Montreal River, McKenny found him and his wife poor and starving at this point. Keesh-ke-mun was blind at this point and his wife had to represent him and speak for him at the Council of Fond du Lac.

Keesh-ke-num died either in 1827 or 1828. After his death he was succeeded by his son Mozobodo.

== Names ==
According to Dr. Schenck his name means Sharpened Stone or La Pierre à Affiler in French. He may have been know as the Dresser or Proud Man.

His name was also Kishkitchiman, meaning Cut-by-Rocks Canoe. Other spellings of his name include Gishkiman and Kish-ki-man.
