= Jean-Baptiste Cadotte Jr. =

Métis fur trader

- Born: October 25, 1761; Sault Ste. Marie
- Died: 1818 (aged 56–57); Near Fort George, Ontario
- Parents: Jean-Baptiste Cadot (father); Athanasie Cadot (mother)
- Family: Cadotte Family

Jean Baptiste Cadotte Jr (October 25, 1761 – 1818) was a Métis fur trader.

== Youth ==
Jean Baptiste Cadotte Jr was born on October 25, 1761, in Sault Ste. Marie, Michigan, United States, he was the third child and first son to Athanasie and Jean-Baptiste Cadot. He was baptized on June 29, 1762 at Michilimackinac.

His father sent him off to school at Sulpician College of St-Raphaël between 1773 and 1780. Then English school between 1781 and 1782.

By 1774 Jean Baptiste may have begun helping out a bit with his father's business. When he became 17 he was about to become a priest, he didn't become a priest possibly due to persuasion by the British. The British possibly wanted him to fight for the British in the American Revolution, but in the end Jean Baptiste never joined on the war and instead joined in the family business as a fur trader.

== Fur trading ==
In 1791, Cadotte and Joseph Réaume led a team of fur traders up to near Leech lake to open trade with Ojibwe and Sioux. The same year, Cadotte build Cadotte trading post north of Crow Wing River.

At Sault Ste. Marie September 2, 1795, he signed a 3-year contract with North West Company to serve as a clerk for £3,600. He was the only metis to have a contract with the company.

== Later years and death ==
In 1797 he married a woman named Saugemauqua.

In 1813, he became an interpreter the for Indian Department of Upper Canada. Jean Baptiste Cadotte Jr died 1818, near Fort George in Ontario Canada.

== Legacy ==
2 lakes would be named after him. One in Burrett county and the second one in Chippewa and Rusk counties.
