= Madeline Island =

Largest of the Apostle Islands in Lake Superior

Coordinates: 46°48′59″N 90°41′21″W

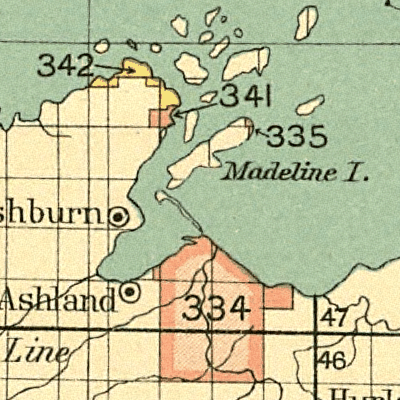
An early map of Chequamegon Bay.

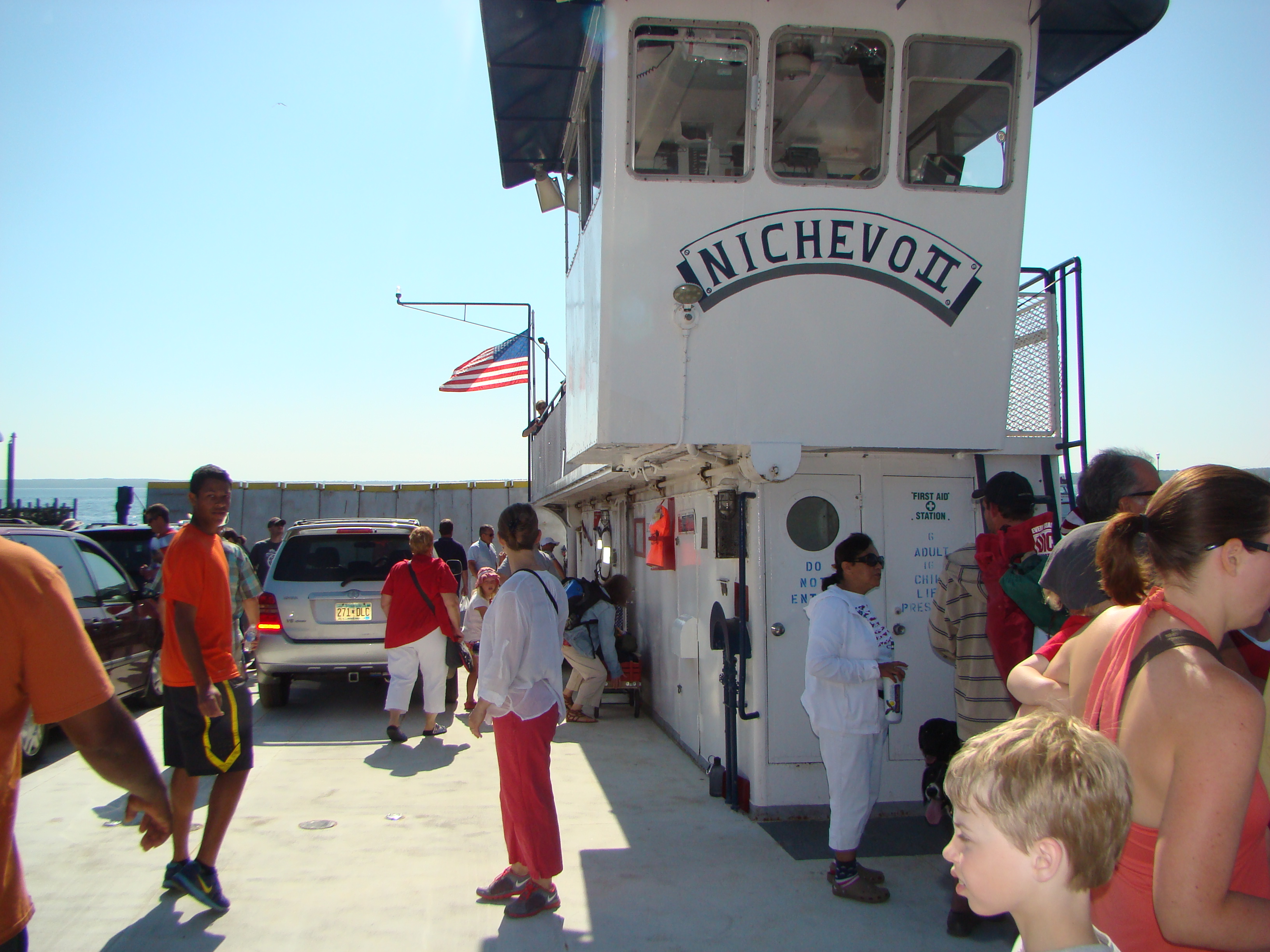
The ferry Nichevo II, about to leave for Madeline Island. Nichevo is Russian for "no matter".

Madeline Island (Ojibwe: Mooningwanekaaning) is an island in Lake Superior. Located in Ashland County, Wisconsin, it has long been a spiritual center of the Lake Superior Chippewa. Although the largest of the Apostle Islands, it is not included in the Apostle Islands National Lakeshore. It is the only island in the Apostle Island chain open to commercial development and private ownership.

The community of La Pointe, located on the western edge of the island and established by French colonists as a fur trading post, was one of the earliest European settlements in the area. It has a population of 302, with a higher population during the summer tourist season. The island can be accessed by ferry from nearby Bayfield.

== History ==
Madeline Island has been the traditional spiritual center of the Lake Superior Chippewa. A traditional Anishinaabeg story says that Great Spirit Gitche Manitou told the people to travel west to the place where the "food grows upon the water." They traveled until they reached the area of the wild rice that grew in the marshes in nearby Chequamegon Bay.

Madeline Island is named after Madeleine Cadotte, Ikwesewe, a daughter of the Ojibwe chief White Crane and his wife. Madeleine married fur trader Michel Cadotte and they were prominent leaders on the island in the 19th century. The island was inhabited by Native Americans, fur traders, and missionaries for over 400 years, and has flown the flags of three nations: France, Great Britain and the United States.

=== Early settlers ===
Originally called Mooningwanekaaning ("At [the Place] Abundant with Yellow-shafted Northern flicker"), the island was inhabited for hundreds of years by the La Pointe Band of Lake Superior Chippewa, an Ojibwa band of the Lake Superior Chippewa.

The first European settlers were French fur traders, who in 1693 established a fort. The community of La Pointe developed around it. In the early 19th century, La Pointe became the site of an important post of John Jacob Astor's American Fur Company, established in 1808. This location was headed by Michel Cadotte, whose wife was Ikwesewe (Madeline), daughter of an Ojibwa chief. The island was named for her. They were a prominent couple on the island, and an example of many marriages between traders and high-ranking Ojibwe women. Such women were integral to the trading success of their husbands, as they helped create goodwill and provided access to the Native American communities. Native women were also prominent in the trading community on Mackinac Island and at Sault Ste. Marie, Michigan.

=== Fur trade and early industry ===
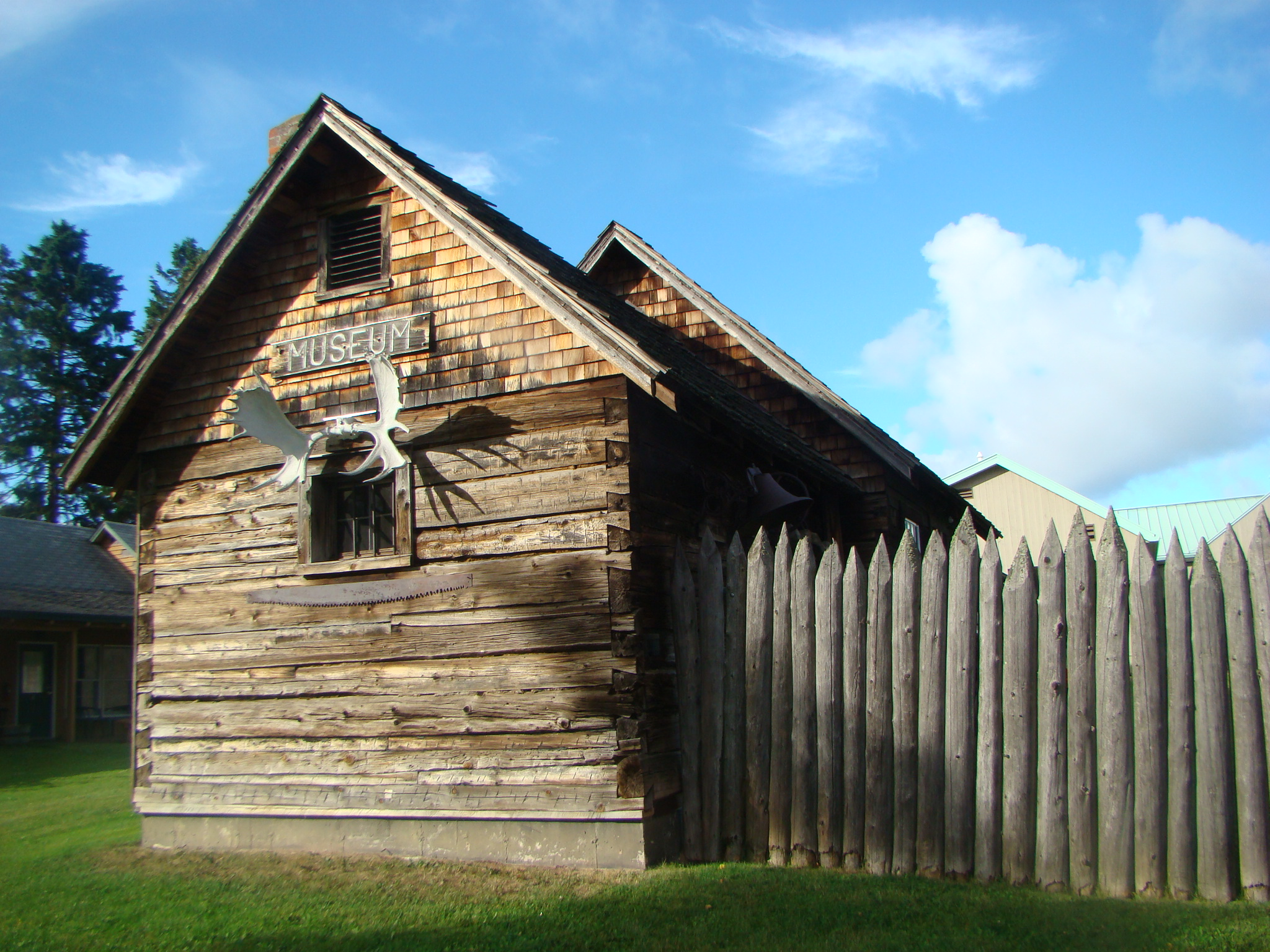
Front of the Madeline Island Historical Museum

For 150 years, Madeline Island was an important outpost for French, British and American fur traders. They brought European and American goods to trade with Native Americans for furs that were highly desired in the European markets.

In about 1660, Radisson and Groseilliers, two explorers and fur traders, made their way to Chequamegon Bay. They started a French fur trading post on the island, which they then considered part of New France, although it was traditional territory of the Anishinaabeg and previous indigenous cultures. From about 1660 through 1763, a fierce rivalry grew between France and Great Britain in North America, as each European power struggled to expand its fur-trading territories and control the lucrative fur trade. As part of the Seven Years' War, British and French regular and mostly colonial forces, together with assorted Indian allies, fought in North America. With the British victory, France ceded all its territories east of the Mississippi River.

In the early 19th century, following the exclusion of Canadian traders from U.S. territories after the War of 1812, the fur trade on the island came under the control of the American Fur Company, founded by John Jacob Astor in 1808. This trade was managed by the South West Company, the Midwestern division of the Astor company. Before 1830 Astor had established a monopoly on the fur trade in the United States. Having made millions, he left the trade before it declined and started to invest in real estate in New York and other cities. The island's fur trading history has been preserved in the Madeline Island Historical Museum.

After the decline of the fur trade industry, other industries developed in the region, including logging, commercial fishing, and brownstone quarrying. Apostle Island Brownstone was used to construct the first Milwaukee County Courthouse. Since the mid-20th century, the primary industry has been tourism.

=== Early religious missions ===
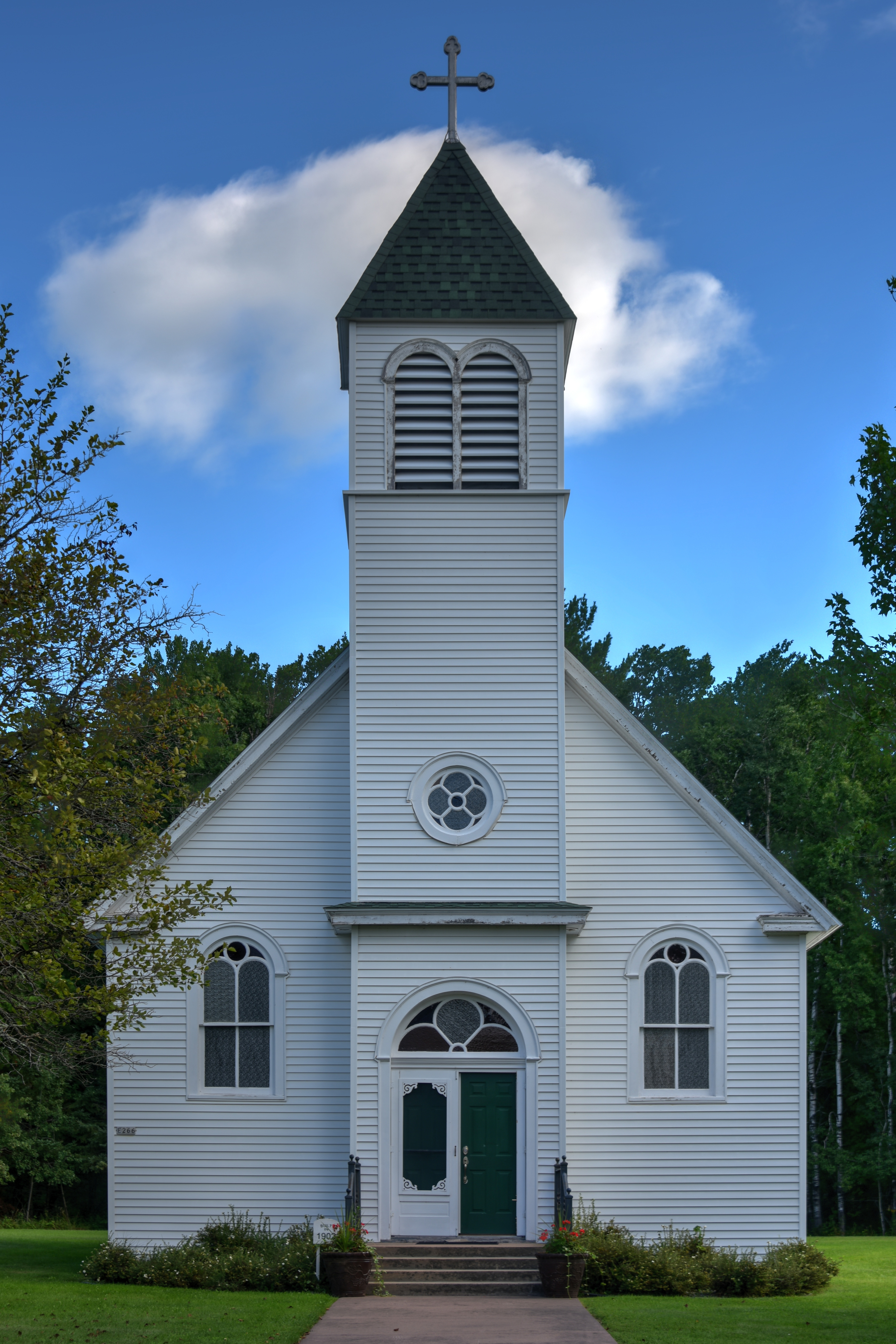
St. Joseph's Catholic Church, founded by Fr. Frederick Baraga in 1838

Around 1665, Jesuit Father Claude Allouez and Father Jacques Marquette arrived and soon established a mission to the Ojibwe. Later, in 1835, Father Frederic Baraga established a Catholic church on the island, at the site of the La Pointe Indian Cemetery. Although the mission building is no longer extant, the old cemetery is still marked. It is the burial place of Chief Buffalo, an important Chippewa leader.

Baraga's second Catholic mission on the island was built in 1838, on the site of the current St. Joseph's Catholic Church. With a congregation dating to 1838, it is the oldest continuous Catholic parish in Wisconsin. The original church building burned down in 1901 and was rebuilt in 1902.

A Protestant mission, known as "The Old Mission", dates to 1832. The present La Pointe post office is located in half of the original "Old Mission" dining room. This was added to the Old Mission Inn in 1900, when it was adapted as a hotel. Today, the only Protestant church on the island is St. John's United Church of Christ, built in 1925. Reflecting its French colonial past, many of the island's first church goers were Catholic. For the past five decades the Catholic church closes in winter. Most year-round residents are enrolled at St. John's UCC.

=== Native American significance ===
The island was considered the spiritual center for many Ojibwe/Chippewa who migrated from eastern regions around the Great Lakes.

In the 19th century, the island was the home of Kechewaishke, or Chief Buffalo, who was instrumental in resisting the efforts of the U.S. government to remove the Chippewa from the region. He secured permanent reservations under the Treaty of La Pointe of 1854. The bulk of the Ojibwe on Madeline Island resettled to the Bad River Reservation east of Ashland. Chief Buffalo was granted a tract for his family on the mainland just west of Madeline Island, in what is now known as the Red Cliff Indian Reservation. On the eastern end of the island is an exclave of the Bad River Indian Reservation of approximately 195 acres (0.79 km^{2}).

== Geography ==
The island is 14 miles (21 km) long and three miles (5 km) wide. It is the only developed island of all the Apostle Islands, although there are lighthouses on many of the islands and small, preserved fishing communities on a few (such as Stockton Island, Raspberry Island and Manitou Island).

The unincorporated community of La Pointe, Wisconsin, which is the main settlement in the Town of La Pointe, is located on the southwestern tip of the island, with Grant's Point being the southeasternmost point. The communities of Middleport and Old Fort are also on the island.

=== Climate ===
Madeline Island has a humid continental climate (Köppen Dfb).

Climate data for Madeline Island (1991–2020 normals, extremes 1944–present)
Month	Jan	Feb	Mar	Apr	May	Jun	Jul	Aug	Sep	Oct	Nov	Dec	Year
Record high °F (°C)	52 (11)	59 (15)	80 (27)	87 (31)	92 (33)	97 (36)	102 (39)	98 (37)	93 (34)	87 (31)	74 (23)	58 (14)	102 (39)
Mean maximum °F (°C)	41.0 (5.0)	46.7 (8.2)	58.7 (14.8)	72.9 (22.7)	82.5 (28.1)	87.6 (30.9)	90.0 (32.2)	89.0 (31.7)	84.2 (29.0)	75.6 (24.2)	58.0 (14.4)	44.4 (6.9)	91.7 (33.2)
Mean daily maximum °F (°C)	22.1 (−5.5)	26.4 (−3.1)	36.9 (2.7)	48.3 (9.1)	61.1 (16.2)	70.8 (21.6)	76.9 (24.9)	76.1 (24.5)	68.0 (20.0)	53.9 (12.2)	39.6 (4.2)	27.6 (−2.4)	50.6 (10.3)
Daily mean °F (°C)	14.4 (−9.8)	16.5 (−8.6)	26.5 (−3.1)	38.0 (3.3)	49.7 (9.8)	59.7 (15.4)	66.4 (19.1)	65.9 (18.8)	58.1 (14.5)	45.4 (7.4)	32.9 (0.5)	21.5 (−5.8)	41.2 (5.1)
Mean daily minimum °F (°C)	6.7 (−14.1)	6.6 (−14.1)	16.1 (−8.8)	27.8 (−2.3)	38.4 (3.6)	48.6 (9.2)	55.9 (13.3)	55.8 (13.2)	48.3 (9.1)	36.8 (2.7)	26.3 (−3.2)	15.5 (−9.2)	31.9 (−0.1)
Mean minimum °F (°C)	−13.3 (−25.2)	−13.8 (−25.4)	−6.2 (−21.2)	15.3 (−9.3)	27.1 (−2.7)	35.9 (2.2)	45.3 (7.4)	45.4 (7.4)	34.6 (1.4)	25.4 (−3.7)	11.7 (−11.3)	−3.5 (−19.7)	−17.2 (−27.3)
Record low °F (°C)	−30 (−34)	−35 (−37)	−31 (−35)	−1 (−18)	18 (−8)	28 (−2)	33 (1)	33 (1)	24 (−4)	17 (−8)	−5 (−21)	−23 (−31)	−35 (−37)
Average precipitation inches (mm)	1.49 (38)	1.12 (28)	1.75 (44)	2.92 (74)	3.31 (84)	3.59 (91)	3.75 (95)	3.17 (81)	3.06 (78)	3.19 (81)	2.33 (59)	1.82 (46)	31.50 (800)
Average snowfall inches (cm)	18.8 (48)	14.1 (36)	11.5 (29)	5.3 (13)	0.3 (0.76)	0.0 (0.0)	0.0 (0.0)	0.0 (0.0)	0.0 (0.0)	0.7 (1.8)	6.4 (16)	16.4 (42)	73.5 (187)
Average precipitation days (≥ 0.01 in)	11.3	7.9	8.4	10.0	10.8	10.7	10.1	8.7	10.0	11.7	9.7	10.8	120.1
Average snowy days (≥ 0.1 in)	10.1	7.5	4.8	2.6	0.1	0.0	0.0	0.0	0.0	0.4	3.6	8.9	38.0
Source: NOAA

== Transportation ==
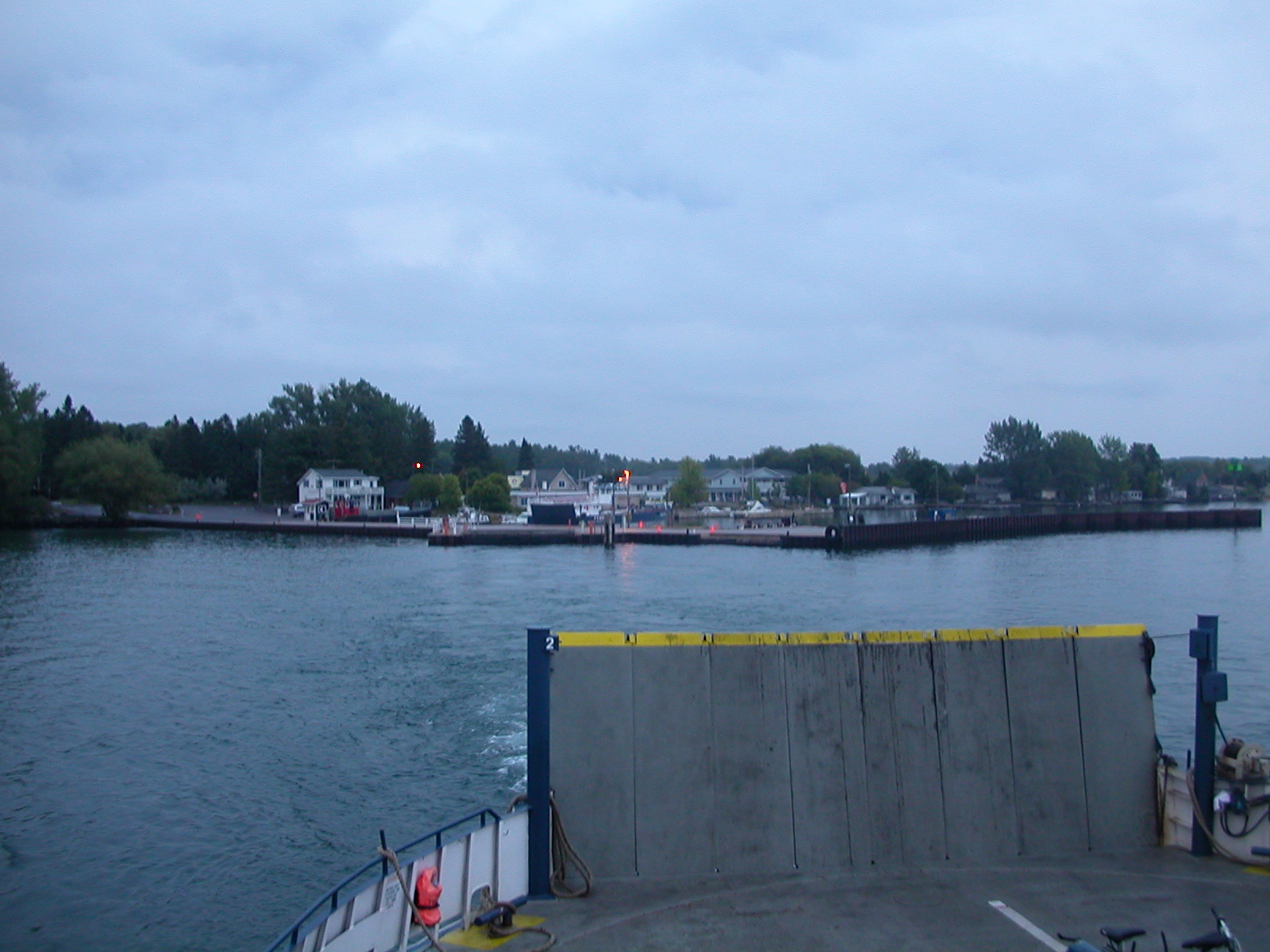
Approaching Madeline Island by ferry

The island can be reached by ferry and aircraft during the summer months. In the winter, the ice is usually too thick for ferry traffic. The last ferry runs of the season are typically in mid- to late January.

When ice conditions allow, an ice road is opened to vehicle traffic from Bayfield across the frozen surface to Madeline Island. The ice road is traditionally marked by Christmas trees and is officially an extension of County Highway H. If ice is too thin for automobile traffic, but too thick for ferry traffic, access to the island is by aircraft, snowmobile, and wind sled only. The wind sled often operates in early winter and spring.

The island can also be accessed by private boat and private charter service.

The island is serviced by Major Gilbert Field Airport (4R5)

== Education ==
The island's school educates children through 5th grade. Middle and high school-age students attend school in Bayfield.

== Tourism and recreation ==
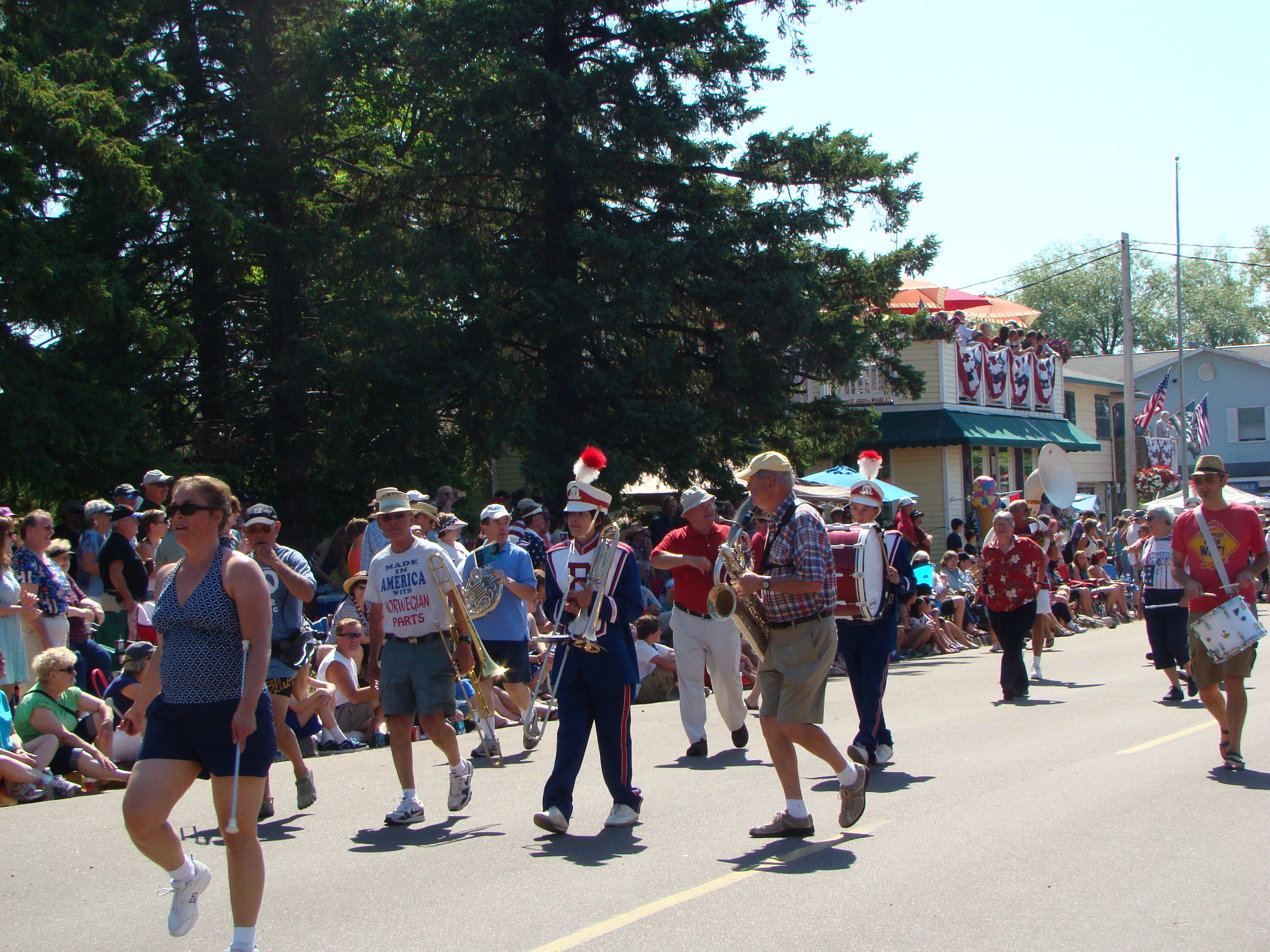
Fourth of July parade on Madeline Island

The major industry on Madeline Island is summer tourism. Because of the natural environment of the area and its outdoor recreational opportunities, the island is a vacation spot for people from the Midwest.

=== Activities ===
Hiking, biking, fishing and sailing are common activities, with bicycles and mopeds available for rent. Also for hire are kayaks and canoes, used to explore the underwater caves and hollows of the cliff faces. The island is known for its beaches on Lake Superior. Swimming is a less frequent activity because of the low water temperatures, although the beaches are a popular destination during the summer. The surface water temperature in the sheltered bay can rise to 70 °F (21 °C) while the water just off shore might remain at 50 °F (10 °C).

The golf club sports a course designed by Robert Trent Jones that features double greens.

The Apostle Islands Cruise Service provides tours of the Apostle Islands National Lakeshore, including the historic Apostle Islands Lighthouses.

The Madeline Island Marathon and Half-Marathon is held in May, and features a course that begins and ends at Joni's Beach.

=== Accommodations ===
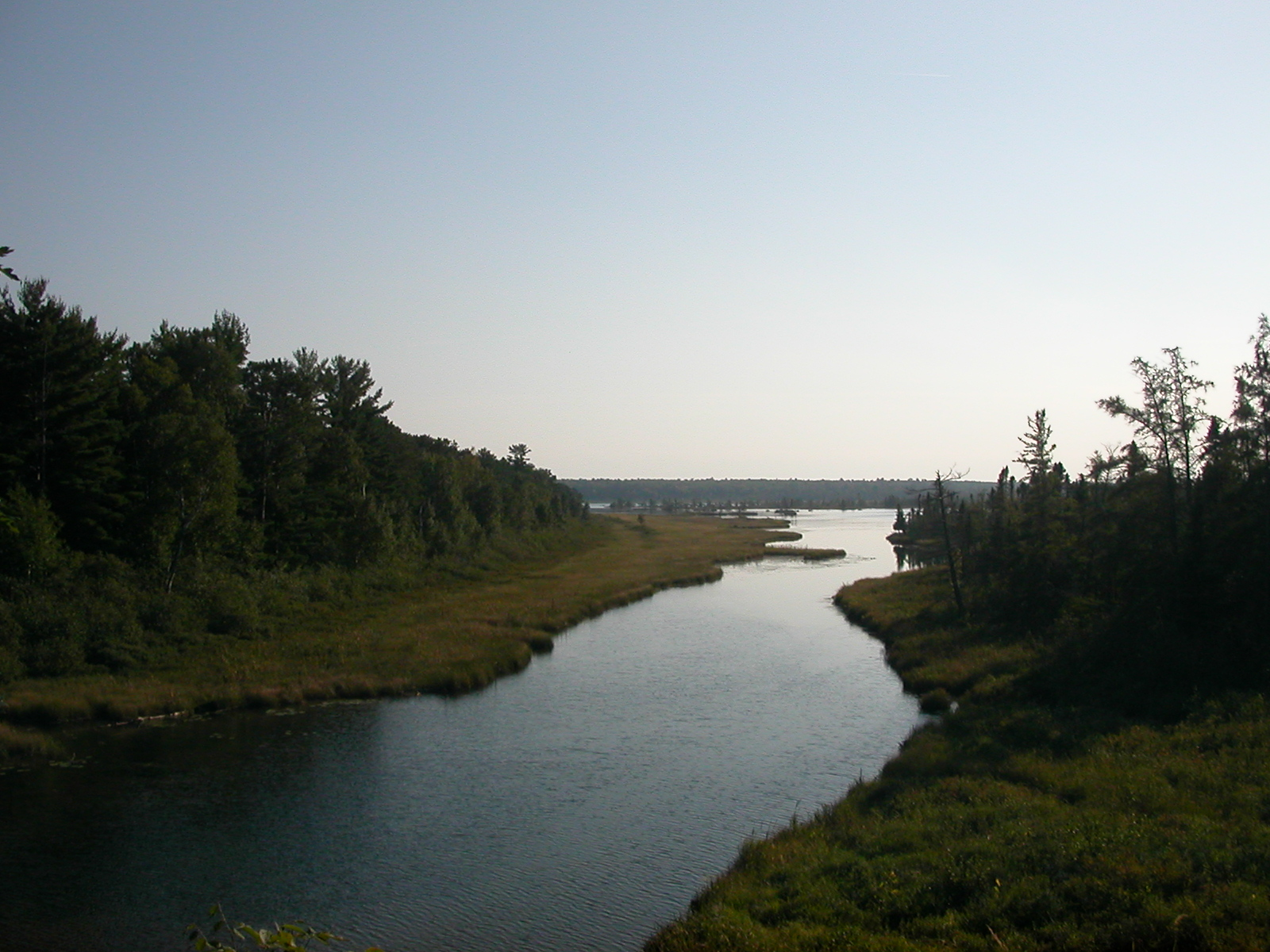
Lagoon in the interior of Madeline Island in summer 2005. It is primarily a wildlife refuge.

There are 60 campsites in Big Bay State Park, a 2,350-acre (9.5 km^{2}) park operated by the Wisconsin Department of Natural Resources on the south central shore of the island. The park is sometimes called Eagles' Nest for the bald eagles that make their nests in the tall pine trees on the cliffs. It encloses a large lagoon and a bog/dune ecosystem.

Big Bay Town Park, which adjoins the state park, also offers camping and provides access to the longest beach on the island.

Other accommodations on the island include a motel and rental cabins.

=== Sites of interest ===
- The Madeline Island Historical Museum, operated by the Wisconsin Historical Society, exhibits the history of the island. The original museum consists of four historic log structures that were relocated and joined together, along with a modern addition that houses historical artifacts.
- La Pointe Indian Cemetery, located next to the modern-day boat marina, was established at the site of the first permanent Catholic mission on the island in 1835.
- The Ojibwe National Prayer Pole/Memorial Park is an area containing sacred trees surrounding a pond, honoring the relationship between Ojibwe people and Madeline Island.
- A stone and brass plaque commemorates the Michel Cadotte Fur Trading Post of 1792; it is located on private property two miles from the ferry dock.
- Joni's Beach is a public beach, picnic and playground area.
- Madeline Island Music Camp Clubhouse is an International Music Camp performance venue.

== In popular culture ==
Many legends and myths involving the island have added to the mystique of the place, especially in and around the Chequamegon Bay region. Fascination with the history of the island has helped fuel this phenomenon.

In the book Badger Boneyards: The Eternal Rest of the Story (2010), author Dennis McCann discusses the history of the La Pointe Indian Cemetery, and how it has sparked the imagination of people over the decades. Other sources mention rumors of paranormal activity associated with the cemetery, such as spirits of Ojibwe people.

The island has been a setting for several novels, including Moon Over Madeline Island (2005) by Jay Gilbertson.

Riding the Wind is a musical production that portrays Bayfield and Old La Pointe, as told through story and song. It has been produced at the Lake Superior Big Top Chautauqua, an outdoor musical venue south of Bayfield.

A song by Owl City from the album Cinematic is about a camping trip on Madeline Island.

== Notable residents ==
- Michel Cadotte, prominent 19th-century fur trader married to Ikewesewe, noted Ojibwa woman for whom Madeline Island was named
- Kechewaishke, (Ojibwa) 19th-century leader who gained reserves near Lake Superior
- Thomas D. O'Brien, Justice of the Minnesota Supreme Court
- Ozhaguscodaywayquay, (Ojibwa), married John Johnston; they were a prominent trading family at Sault Ste. Marie, and their daughter Jane Johnston is the first Native American literary writer
- William Whipple Warren, historian of the Ojibwe and Minnesota Territory legislator of Ojibwe/European-American ancestry

== See also ==
- Populated islands of the Great Lakes
- List of islands of the United States
- Islands of the Great Lakes
- French Island and Washington Island, other populated islands in Wisconsin
