= William Whipple Warren =

Historian, interpreter, and legislator in the Minnesota Territory

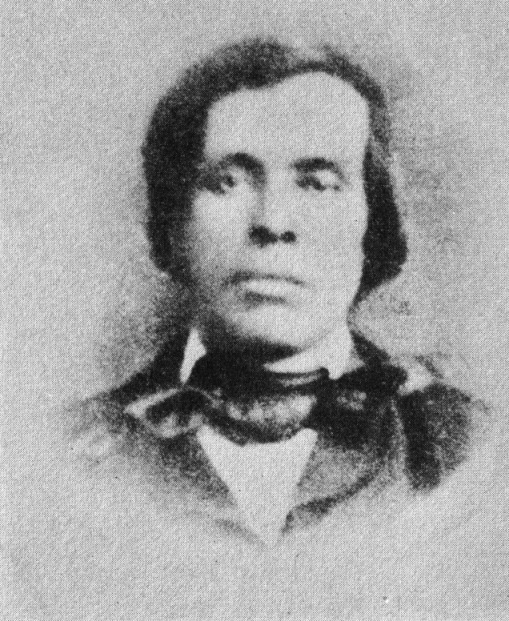
William Whipple Warren (c. 1851)

William Whipple Warren (May 27, 1825 – June 1, 1853) was a historian, interpreter, and legislator in the Minnesota Territory. The son of Lyman Marcus Warren, an American fur trader and Mary Cadotte, the mixed ancestry daughter of fur trader Michel Cadotte, he was of Ojibwe and French descent. William lived in two cultures, because his father was white, he was not considered Ojibwe, but an Ojibwe "relative", because in the Ojibwe patrilineal culture, inheritance and property were passed through the paternal line. His mother was Ojibwe and he learned her culture from her family. He is the first historian of the Ojibwe people in the European tradition.

In the fall of 1845, Warren moved at the age of 20 from Wisconsin to Crow Wing in present-day Minnesota. He worked as an interpreter for the fur trader Henry Mower Rice.

Bilingual and educated in the United States style, Warren started collecting stories from the oral tradition of the Ojibwe to tell their history. He drew from oral history to tell about the people prior to their encounter with Europeans, and combined it with documentation in the European style. After suffering from tuberculosis for many years, he died as a young man of 28 from a hemorrhage on June 1, 1853, and was buried in Saint Paul, Minnesota. His history was published posthumously in 1885 by the Minnesota Historical Society. A revised, annotated edition was published in 2009.

== Early life and family ==
William Whipple Warren was born in 1825 in La Pointe, Michigan Territory (present-day Wisconsin), on Madeline Island. He was the son of Mary Cadotte, an Ojibwe and the daughter of Ikwesewe or Madeline Cadotte, daughter of the headman of the high-status White Crane clan of the Anishinaabe, and her husband Michel Cadotte, a major fur trader of Ojibwe-French descent. Her parents had both been important to the fur trade on Madeline Island, named after her mother in 1828. His father was Lyman Marcus Warren, an American fur trader and descendant of Richard Warren in New England.

As the Ojibwe had a patrilineal system, children were considered to be born into their father's clan and lines of descent. Those born to a non-Ojibwe father had no clan or formal place within the tribe, unless specifically adopted by a man of the tribe. They and their mothers could usually find protection within the tribe. Such multiracial children of the period often also faced discrimination by European-American society, whose people considered them more "Indian" than white, regardless of the lines of ancestry.

Lyman and Mary had a second son Truman (named after his brother) and daughters Julia and Mary. (The senior Truman Warren had married a sister of Mary Cadotte, so the families were doubly linked. Truman Warren and his wife had twin sons Edward and George Warren, a few years younger than William.)

After attending Protestant mission schools at La Pointe and on Mackinac Island, in 1836 young Warren traveled back East with his paternal grandfather Lyman Warren to Clarkson, New York to live. There he attended Clarkson Academy. He next attended the Oneida Institute near Whitesboro, New York, a Presbyterian college founded for the education of Native Americans. It combined liberal and what was called industrial or artisan education. The director was Beriah Green, an abolitionist. In 1840 at the age of 15, Warren returned to his family in La Pointe.

== Career ==
Warren liked to sit with his mother's people and hear the Ojibwe stories. At age 17, he started working as an interpreter, as he was bilingual. At the same time, he made notes on the stories and history of the Ojibwe when he could. In the fall of 1845, he moved to Crow Wing, Wisconsin Territory (now Minnesota) to work as an interpreter for the trader Henry Mower Rice. Warren continued collecting stories and began to write a history of the Ojibwe.

A man of two cultures, Warren was considered a mixed-blood. "He knew he would not be considered an Indian by the Indians, nor did he dare declare himself Indian. Still the Ojibwe considered him their relative ... and relied on him for his counsel and his honesty." He considered that he had a unique position for collecting and writing the history of the Ojibwe.

In 1848 Rice had Warren answering survey questions about the Ho-Chunk and Ojibwe. The survey had been sent by Henry Rowe Schoolcraft, an early ethnologist and the former US Superintendent of Indian Affairs in the region. He was collecting material for what would be his six-volume history of Native Americans, commissioned by the US Congress. Warren met Schoolcraft, who gave the young man an additional sense of how important his work was. Rice passed Warren's work on to the Minnesota Pioneer, which in 1849 published his essays on history.

In time away from his work as an interpreter with Rice, Warren continued to collect the tribal stories. He worked to find ways to identify dates in the Ojibwe oral histories, in order to write a history that satisfied some of European-American conventions. Historians have found that his work is generally quite accurate. As the historian Theresa Schenk notes in a 2009 edition, he was "one of the first to recognize the value of oral tradition as a source for history."

Encouraged by the reception of his work, Warren prepared A Brief History of the Ojibwas, which the Minnesota Democrat newspaper published in several installments in 1851. He used the perspective of his American education to present the stories of the Ojibwe people. He recounted their wars, political leaders and history, and always credited his sources. Most of his informants were men, as would be traditional for a young man. Worried that the culture was disappearing, he felt it needed to be conveyed by its own people.

In 1851 Warren was elected as a legislator from the Minnesota Territory, serving in the Minnesota Territorial House of Representatives. He was one of seven members of the House who resigned in protest over the 1851 reapportionment plan, claiming that the census count was incorrect. He sought re-election in 1851, but lost to James Beatty. He challenged Beatty's election, saying that many of the votes cast for Beatty were illegal; but the House denied his challenge.

The trader Henry Rice also became a politician and was elected several years later by the state legislature as a United States Senator (1858–1863). In 1865, he ran as a candidate for governor of Minnesota.

== Marriage and family ==
Warren married Mathilda Aitken, August 10, 1843, at La Pointe. She was born around 1822 at Sandy Lake, Minnesota and baptized September 13, 1835 at La Pointe. She had multi-racial ancestry similar to his: she was the daughter of Gin-gion-cumig-oke, an Ojibwe woman, and her husband William Alexander Aitken, a European-American fur trader.

The Warren children were:

- Alfred A. (1844–1934)
- Cordelia H. "Delia" (c. 1846–1940)
- Anna (1846–1940)
- William Tyler (1848–1900)
- Madeline (1853–1907)

After the early death of Warren in 1853, his widow Mathilda later married Louis Fontaine. Under the Dawes Act, as an Ojibwe she was allotted land on the White Earth Reservation as "Mathilda Fontaine," when communal lands were divided among the households of members of the tribe. Mathilda Fontaine died October 19, 1902.

== Work ==
- Warren's History of the Ojibway People, Based Upon Traditions and Oral Statements (1885) was published more than 30 years after his death by the Minnesota Historical Society. He was the first European-style historian of the Ojibwe people, and his work is considered influential in the field. It was reprinted in 2009 in a version annotated and edited by the historian Theresa Schenck, who provides context for his work.

== Selected works of William W. Warren ==
- Warren, William W. "Answers to Inquiries Respecting the History, Present Conditions and Future Prospects of the Ojibwas of Mississippi and Lake Superior." Minnesota Pioneer, 6 Sept., 5 Dec., 12 Dec., 19 Dec, 26 Dec., 1849. Reprinted as "Answers to Inquiries Regarding Chippewas" in Minnesota Archaeologist, Vol. 13, No.1 (Jan. 1947), 5-21.
- Warren, William W. History of the Ojibways, based upon Traditions and Oral Statements. Annotated by E.D. Neill. In Collections of the Minnesota Historical Society, Volume V. Saint Paul, MN: Published by the Society. Philadelphia: Collins Printer, 1885.
