= Sandy Lake Tragedy =

1850 tragedy in Minnesota that led to the creation of Ojibwe reservations

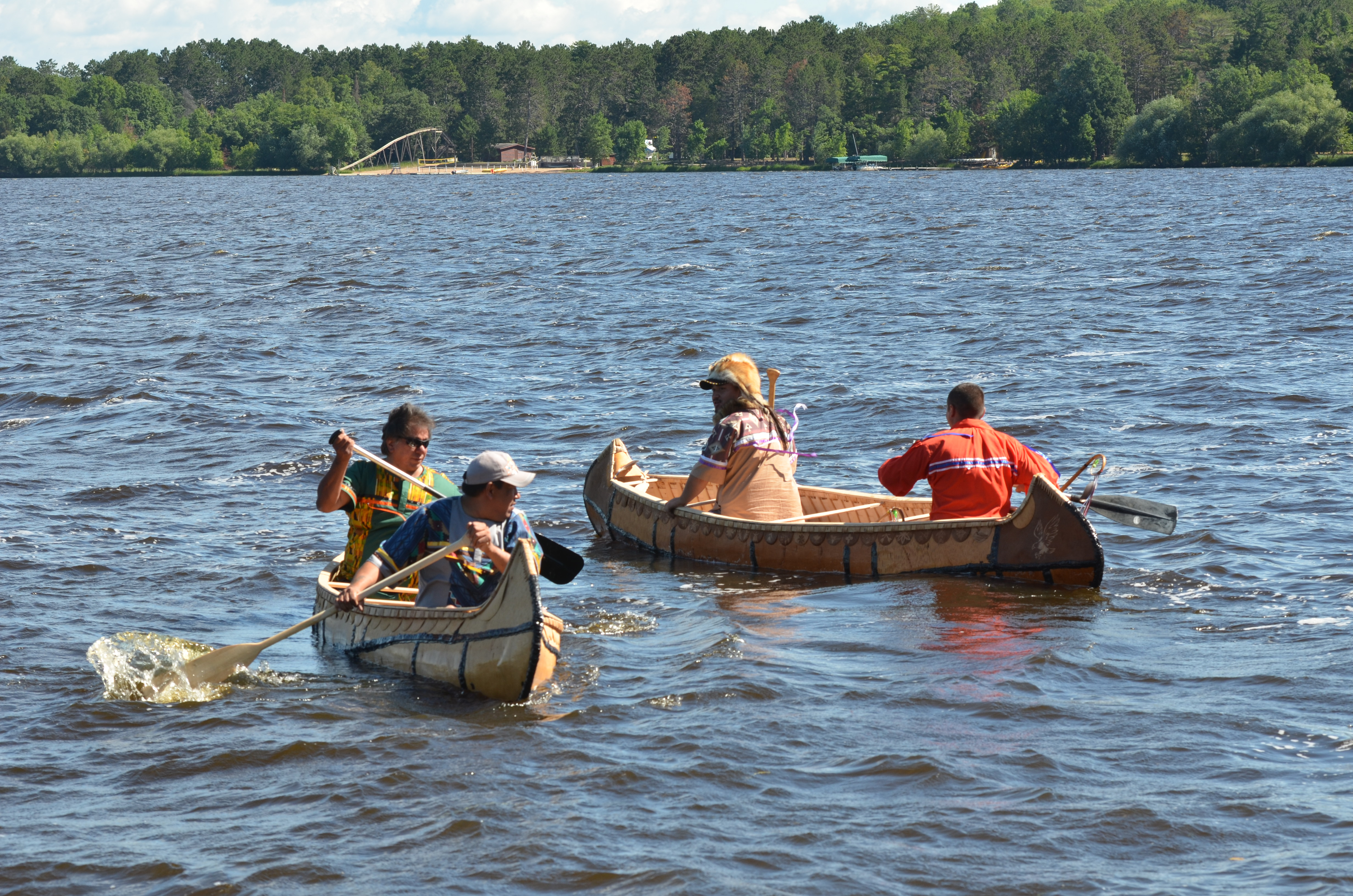
U.S. Army Corps of Engineers and members of the Ojibwa nation canoe across Big Sandy Lake in honor of those who died in the Sandy Lake Tragedy (Big Sandy Camp is near the top left corner of the picture)

The Sandy Lake Tragedy was the culmination in 1850 of a series of events centered in Big Sandy Lake, Minnesota that resulted in the deaths of several hundred Lake Superior Chippewa. Officials of the Zachary Taylor Administration and Minnesota Territory sought to relocate several bands of the tribe to areas west of the Mississippi River. By changing the location for fall annuity payments, the officials intended the Chippewa to stay at the new site for the winter, hoping to lower their resistance to relocation. Due to delayed and inadequate payments of annuities and lack of promised supplies, about 400 Ojibwe, mostly men and 12% of the tribe, died of disease, starvation and cold. The outrage increased Ojibwe resistance to removal. The bands effectively gained widespread public support to achieve permanent reservations in their traditional territories.

== Background ==
By the 17th century, the Ojibwe nation occupied much of the Lake Superior region, from east to west, in modern-day Ontario of Canada, and Michigan, Wisconsin, and Minnesota of the United States. The bands in Wisconsin, Michigan, and parts of eastern Minnesota who were located east of the Mississippi River were effectively included under the terms of the Indian Removal Act of 1830, which sought to remove Indians and extinguish their land claims in those regions. It was directed particularly against the tribes in the American Southeast. At that time, numerous European Americans had not yet reached these Lake Superior lands for settlement, and there was little political pressure for Ojibwe removal.

By 1850, however, the mid-century wave of increased migration to Wisconsin and Minnesota had altered the political climate. European Americans pressed Congress and the President for relief from competing with the Ojibwe for land and resources. High-ranking officials in President Zachary Taylor's administration planned an unlawful and unconstitutional removal of the Ojibwe, breaking multiple treaties in the process. The policy was planned by Secretary of Interior Thomas Ewing, Commissioner of Indian Affairs Orlando Brown, Minnesota Territory Governor Alexander Ramsey and Sub-Agent John Watrous. Although Ewing and Brown left office before the events took place, Ramsey and Watrous were involved throughout.

== Tragedy ==
To force the Ojibwe west of the Mississippi, Brown directed the Bureau of Indian Affairs (BIA) to change the site of the fall payment of annual annuities and provision of supplies. The BIA notified the people that rather than this annuity rendezvous being held at La Pointe, Wisconsin, the economic and spiritual center of the nation, as was common, it would be moved to a sub-agency at the more isolated trade-hub location of Sandy Lake. By bringing the Ojibwe to Minnesota in late fall and planning to delay them there, the BIA expected the Native Americans would have to stay there for the winter. The officials hoped to wear down the resistance of the Chippewa (as they were called in the United States) to relocation. They kept the scheme secret from local European Americans as well as the American Indians. Officials in favor of relocation knew that the Chippewa would then be spending their annuity payments in Minnesota (west of the Mississippi River) rather than in Wisconsin, and thus benefit the local and regional patronage system. Such an outcome would be economically and politically beneficial to the officials who planned the strategy.

Concerned about the issues of the move, many bands of Ojibwe gathered to deliberate their options. The discussions were so lengthy that the Ojibwe had little time to plant their regular spring crops. As a result, they had to go to Sandy Lake to gain payments and supplies for their very survival. In the fall of 1850, representatives from 19 Ojibwe bands packed up and started the arduous journey to the shores of Sandy Lake, where they had been told to gather by late October. Nearly 3,000 Ojibwe men waited there for several weeks before any government agent arrived.

He informed them that the government had been unable to send the annuities and supplies. It was early December before a small portion of the payment and goods finally reached Sandy Lake. Much of the food supplies were spoiled and only a small percentage of the payment arrived. By this time, crowded in inadequate camps, about 150 Ojibwe had already died of dysentery, measles, starvation, or freezing. They returned to their home territories under peril: aside from being weak from sickness and hunger, the Ojibwe had not expected to have to make such a winter journey. As a result, 200–230 more Ojibwe died before reaching their homes by the following January.

== Results ==
As a result of this tragedy, the Lake Superior Chippewa bands under the leadership of Chief Buffalo of La Pointe, pressed President Millard Fillmore to cancel the removal order. Many of the United States public were outraged about the government's treatment of the Ojibwe and supported the end of removal. Chief Buffalo called on Wisconsin residents to support them in their effort to stay in the territory. Not wanting to live with Indians among them, European Americans encouraged the establishment of Indian reservations.

During the three years following the Sandy Lake events, Chief Buffalo negotiated hard and became a proponent for permanent reservations in Michigan, Wisconsin and Minnesota. This strategy was detailed under the 1854 Treaty of La Pointe. The Chippewa/Ojibwe achieved their major goal – to stay within their traditional territories. Many of the bands agreed to the founding of Ojibwe reservations and relocation to them. The majority of the reservations were created at already well-established Ojibwe communities. Often the federal government required the aggregation of less powerful bands with their more powerful neighbors.

Under the Treaty of La Pointe, the following reservations were established:

- Grand Portage;
- Fond du Lac;
- Red Cliff;
- Lac Courte Oreilles;
- Bad River,
- Lac Vieux Desert, L'Anse;
- Ontonagon; and
- Lac du Flambeau.

The following year, by the Treaty of Washington (1855), the government created additional reservations in Minnesota.

For the Pillager Chippewa:

- Leech Lake Indian Reservations:
  - Leech Lake
  - Cass Lake; and
  - Lake Winnibigoshish reservations.

For the Mississippi Chippewa:

- Mille Lacs Indian Reservation reservations.
  - Mille Lacs Lake
  - Sandy Lake;
  - Pokegama Lake;
  - Rabbit Lake;
  - Gull Lake; and

The same treaty established the Rice Lake Indian Reservation. Because the Bureau of Land Management objected and said the Rice Lake Indian Reservation was within the boundaries of the Sandy Lake Reservation, it was never formally platted.

== Unfulfilled hopes ==
Despite the Sandy Lake Tragedy, the St. Croix Band and the Mole Lake Band held out in hopes the United States would fulfill previously broken treaties. They refused to sign the Treaty of La Pointe. By refusing the treaty and relocation, the two Ojibwe bands lost their federal recognition and associated benefits.

They did not regain legal recognition until the Indian Reorganization Act of 1934, also known as the Indian "New Deal". During the non-recognition period, the Mole Lake Band became associated with the Lac du Flambeau Indian Reservation. The majority of the St. Croix Band was split and associated with both Lac Courte Oreilles and Mille Lacs Indian reservations.

Along with the Bois Brulé Band, the St. Croix Band at the river's headwaters refused aggregation with the La Pointe Band. The US Army forcibly removed them to the Gull Lake Indian Reservation in central Minnesota. Because the action was illegally taken under the Indian Removal Act, although it had officially ended, Chief Bagonegiizhig of the Gull Lake Band negotiated hard with the BIA to restore these groups to Wisconsin. Not having much success, Chief Bagonegiizhig led his people in the Dakota War of 1862 against the United States. The alliance proved ill-fated, resulting in much of the Mississippi Chippewa being uprooted and removed further west. First they were relocated to the vicinity of Leech Lake, and eventually to the White Earth Indian Reservation.

== Sandy Lake memorials ==
On October 12, 2000, the US erected a memorial commemorating the Sandy Lake Tragedy at the United States Army Corps of Engineers Sandy Lake Dam Campgrounds. In addition, the state created a rest area with a view of Sandy Lake along Minnesota State Highway 65. A Historical Marker plaque memorializes the Sandy Lake Tragedy.

== See also ==
- Sandy Lake Band of Mississippi Chippewa
- Chief Buffalo
