= Kechewaishke =

Ojibwe leader

Kechewaishke (Great Buffalo)
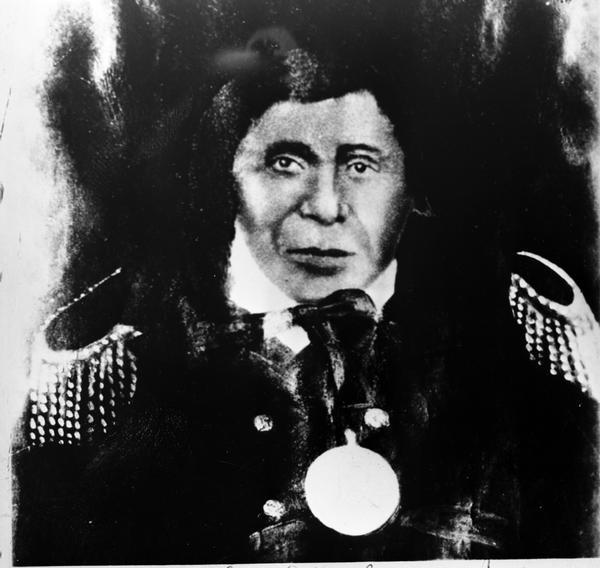
- Photo courtesy of the Wisconsin Historical Society
- Born: c.1759 La Pointe, Madeline Island, Lake Superior
- Died: September 7, 1855; La Pointe
- Other name: Bizhiki (Buffalo)

Chief Buffalo (Ojibwe: Ke-che-waish-ke/Gichi-weshkiinh – "Great-renewer" or Peezhickee/Bizhiki – "Buffalo"; also French, Le Boeuf) (1759? – September 7, 1855) was a major Ojibwa leader, born at La Pointe in Lake Superior's Apostle Islands, in what is now northern Wisconsin, USA.

Recognized as the principal chief of the Lake Superior Chippewa (Ojibwa) for nearly a half-century until his death in 1855, he led his nation into a treaty relationship with the United States Government. He signed treaties in 1825, 1826, 1837, 1842, 1847, and 1854. He was instrumental in resisting the United States' efforts to remove the Ojibwa to western areas and secured permanent Indian reservations for his people near Lake Superior in what is now Wisconsin.

== Background ==
=== Political structure of the Lake Superior Ojibwa ===
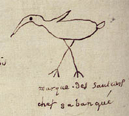
Totemic signature of Ouabangué, head of the Crane doodem at Sault Ste. Marie and first chief of the Ojibwa, on the Great Peace of Montreal (1701)

Kechewaishke was born around 1759 at La Pointe on Madeline Island (Mooningwanekaaning) in the Shagawamikong region. Now part of Wisconsin, La Pointe was a key Ojibwa village and trading center for the empire of New France, which was fighting the Seven Years' War against Great Britain at the time of Kechewaishke's birth. Throughout the 18th century, the Ojibwa spread out from La Pointe into lands conquered from the Dakota people, and settled several village sites. These bands in the western Lake Superior and Mississippi River regions regarded La Pointe as their "ancient capital" and spiritual center. It had also become a center of trade.

Traditional Ojibwa government and society centers around kinship clans, each symbolized by animal doodem. Each doodem had a traditional responsibility within the tribe. Kechewaishke, or Buffalo as he was known to Europeans, belonged to the Loon clan.

The Loon Clan was said to have been rising in prominence in the mid-18th-century due to the efforts of Andaigweos (Ojibwe: Aandegwiiyaas, "Crow's Meat"), Kechewaishke's grandfather. Andaigweos was born in the Shagawamikong region, son to a man described as "a Canadian Indian" (i.e. a Saulteaux from Sault Ste. Marie, a key Ojibwa village at Lake Superior's eastern end). At the time of first French contact in the mid-17th century, men of the Crane doodem held the positions of hereditary peace chiefs of Ojibwa communities at both Sault Ste. Marie and La Pointe. Andaigweos was a skilled orator and favorite of the French officials and voyageurs. In that period, leaders of the Cranes were concerned more with internal matters. By the 19th century, it was Kechewaishke's clan, the Loons, that was recognized as the principal chiefs at La Pointe.

Although the Loons were afforded respect as principal peace chiefs, this status was not permanent. The Cranes, led in Kechewaishke's time by his sub-chief Tagwagane, maintained that they were the hereditary chiefs. They said the Loons' status as spokesmen hinged upon recognition by the Cranes. A chief's power in Ojibwa society was based on persuasion and consensus, holding only as long as the community of elders, including the women, chose to respect and follow the chief's lead.

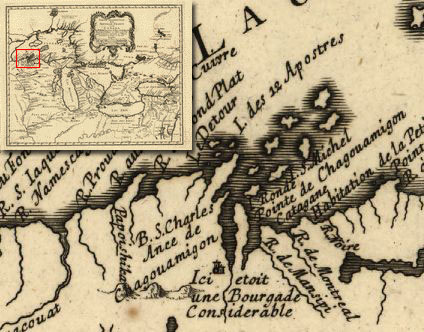
The Chequamegon Bay region as shown on a French map around the time of Buffalo's birth. Madeline Island is shown as I. S. Michel.

=== Personal life ===
Sources conflict as to the identity of Kechewaishke's father, who may also have been named Andaigweos. He appears to have been a descendant or relative of the famous war chief Waubojeeg. When he was about 10, Kechewaishke and his parents moved from La Pointe to the vicinity of what is now Buffalo, New York, and lived there until about he was about 12. The family relocated to the Mackinac Island area for a while before returning to La Pointe. In his youth, Kechewaishke was admired as a skilled hunter and athlete.

Like many Anishinaabe people, Kechewaishke was also known by another Ojibwa name, Peshickee (Bizhiki: "the Buffalo"). This has caused confusion in records of his life, in part because both names were very similar to those of other prominent contemporaries. Bizhiki was the name of a chief from the St. Croix Band, and also of a warrior of the Pillager Chippewa Band (Beshekee). Additionally, a leading member of the Caribou doodem and a son of Waubojeeg, in the Sault Ste. Marie area, was known by the name Waishikey (Weshki). Scholars have mistakenly attributed aspects of the lives of all three of these men to Kechewaishke.

Kechewaishke had five wives and numerous children, many of whom became prominent Ojibwa leaders in the reservation era. He practiced the Midewiwin religion, but converted to Roman Catholicism on his deathbed.

=== Views on international relations ===
Few details of Kechewaishke's early life are known. He appears to have been favored by British traders and decorated by British authorities, but few Ojibwa from Lake Superior fought in the American Revolution or the War of 1812, and there is no record of his participation.

When Tecumseh's War broke out, Kechewaishke and a number of other young warriors from the La Pointe area abandoned the Midewiwin for a time to follow the teachings of the Shawnee prophet Tenskwatawa. While en route to Prophetstown to join the attack on the Americans, they were stopped by Michel Cadotte, the respected Métis fur trader from La Pointe. Cadotte convinced Kechewaishke and the others that it would be fruitless to fight the Americans.

After that incident, Kechewaishke is recorded as using only peaceful tactics in his relations with the United States, though he often opposed US Indian policy. He also drew a contrast between himself and his contemporaries Aysh-ke-bah-ke-ko-zhay and Hole in the Day, two Ojibwa chiefs from present-day Minnesota, who carried out a long war against the Dakota Sioux people.

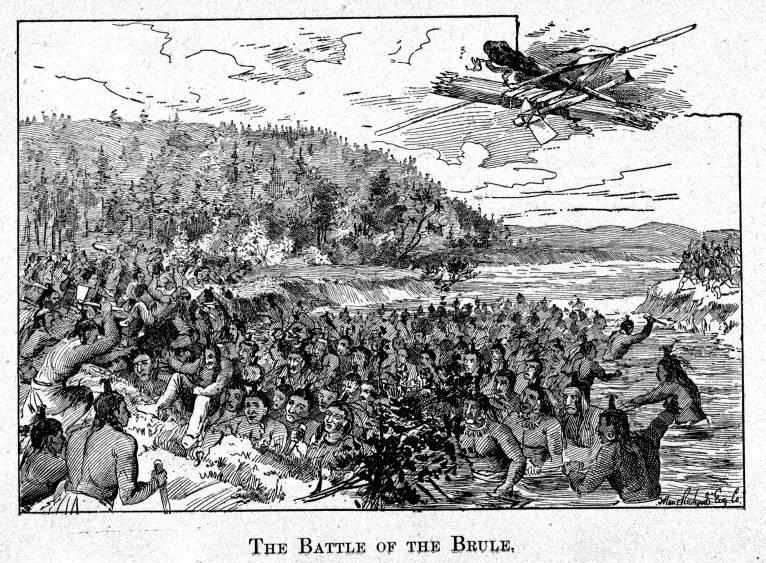
This image of the Battle of the Brule appeared in the 1891 memoirs of Buffalo's adopted son and personal interpreter, Benjamin Armstrong. Armstrong describes being present at this major defensive victory for Buffalo's Ojibwa over a Dakota war party.

Although Armstrong records Kechewaishke winning a large victory over the Dakota in the 1842 Battle of the Brule, 20th-century historians have cast doubt on his account. That year Kechewaishke was recorded as saying he "never took a scalp in his life, though he had taken prisoners whom he fed and well-treated." Overall, he seems to have supported efforts at peace between the Ojibwa and Dakota.

Kechewaishke not only inherited the status afforded his family, but also had skills praised in his grandfather Andaigweos. Noted for his abilities in hunting and battle, he was recognized as chief by his people because of his speaking and oratorical skills, which were highly valued in his culture. By the time the Ojibwa of Wisconsin and Minnesota started treaty negotiations with the US Government, Kechewaishke was recognized as one of the primary spokesmen for all the bands, not just for the Ojibwa from La Pointe.

== Treaties of 1825 and 1826 ==
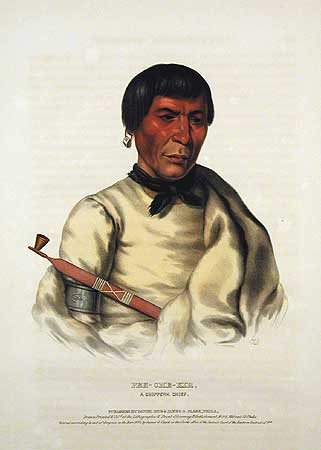
Pee-Che-Kir, A Chippewa Chief. An 1843 lithograph by Charles Bird King (1785-1862), reproduction of an oil painting by Henry Inman (1801-1846) depicting either Kechewaishke or Bizhiki, a chief of the St. Croix Band. Published in History of the Indian Tribes of North America.

In 1825, Kechewaishke was one of 41 Ojibwe leaders to sign the First Treaty of Prairie du Chien, with his name recorded as "Gitspee Waishkee" or La Boeuf. He is listed third after Shingabawossin, who was recognized as head of the Crane doodem at Sault Ste. Marie, and therefore of the whole Ojibwa nation, which was a loose confederacy of bands. Second in the list was chief "Gitspee Jiuaba". The treaty, which the US Government advanced as a pretext to end hostilities between the Dakota and their neighbors, required all American Indian tribes and bands in and around Wisconsin and Iowa to delineate where their territories began and ended. Although the treaty did not state this goal, the US used information it acquired to negotiate to gain Indian lands and remove the nations westward.

A year later, the US and Ojibwa signed the Treaty of Fond du Lac at a meeting at Lake Superior's western edge. The signatories were listed by band, and Kechewaishke, recorded as Peezhickee, signed as the first chief from La Pointe. The treaty, mainly dealing with mineral rights for Ojibwa lands in what is now Michigan, had little immediate effect but foreshadowed future treaties. Kechewaishke did not speak on the copper issue. He praised the US officials for their ability to keep their young people under their control, and asked for whiskey to accomplish the same ends among the younger members of his band. When the agent presented him with a silver medal as a symbol of his chieftainship, Kechewaishke said that his power was based in his clan and reputation, and not from anything received from the U.S. government.

Shortly after the treaties were signed, Henry Rowe Schoolcraft, acting in his capacity as US Indian agent, visited La Pointe. He reprimanded Kechewaishke for not stopping the continuing sporadic warfare between the Ojibwa and Dakota. Kechewaishke replied that he was unable to stop the young men of Lac Courte Oreilles, St. Croix, Lac du Flambeau or other bands beyond La Pointe from fighting the Dakota. Historians take this to mean that while he was regarded as the head spokesman of the Ojibwa in Wisconsin, he could not control the day-to-day affairs of all the bands, which were highly decentralized, particularly with respect to warfare. Kechewaishke also said that, unlike the British before the War of 1812, the U.S. government had not done enough to maintain peace among the tribes.

== Treaties of 1837 and 1842 ==
In the next decades, there was pressure from Americans who wanted to exploit the mineral and timber resources of Ojibwa country, and the US government sought to acquire control of the territory through treaties. The Treaties of 1837 and 1842 covered La Pointe and territories held by other bands over which Kechewaishke held considerable influence. In both treaties, Americans recognized his position as the principal chief of all the Lake Superior Ojibwa.

=== "Pine Tree" treaty ===
In the Treaty of St. Peters (1837), the government sought the pine timber resources on Ojibwa lands. It intended to float the harvested timber southwest into the Mississippi River. The negotiations took place at Fort Snelling, near present-day Minneapolis. The delegations from Minnesota and the St. Croix area arrived first and began discussions on July 20. The assembled chiefs awaited Kechewaishke's judgment before deciding to approve the treaty. Despite the impatience of the territorial governor, Henry Dodge, the negotiations were delayed for five days as the assembled bands waited for Kechewaishke to arrive. While other chiefs spoke about the terms of mineral rights and annuity amounts, Kechewaishke discussed treatment of mixed-blood traders, saying:

I am an Indian and do not know the value of money, but the half-breeds do, for which reason we wish you pay them their share in money. You have good judgment in what you do, and if you do not act yourself, you will appoint someone else to divide it between the half breeds. ...I have good reasons for saying to you what I have just said; for at a certain Treaty held heretofore, there were some who got rich while others received nothing.

Once the terms were agreed to, Kechewaishke marked and was recorded as Pe-zhe-ke, head of the La Pointe delegation. Although he and the other Lake Superior chiefs signed, they were said to be quieter than the Mississippi Chippewa chiefs during the negotiations. Historian Satz says this symbolized disagreement rather than acceptance of the terms of the treaty. Lyman Warren, a trader and interpreter from La Pointe, later complained that the Pillagers (bands from present-day Minnesota) had been bribed into selling the lands rightfully belonging to the Wisconsin bands.

Kechewaishke expressed his misgivings over the treaty negotiations in a letter to Governor Dodge, writing:

"The Indians acted like children; they tried to cheat each other and got cheated themselves. When it comes my turn to sell my land, I do not think I shall give it up as they did." Regarding possible future land cessions, he said: "Father I speak for my people, not for myself. I am an old man. My fire is almost out—there is but little smoke. When I sit in my wigwam & smoke my pipe, I think of what has past and what is to come, and it makes my heart shake. When business comes before us, we will try and act like Chiefs. If any thing is to be done, it had better be done straight."

=== "Copper" treaty ===
Five years later, Kechewaishke was presented with the Treaty of La Pointe covering his lands. Acting Superintendent of Indian Affairs Henry Stuart, who was promoting development of the Lake Superior copper industry, led the negotiations for the US government. No record of the negotiations was made. But materials written by missionaries, traders, and the Ojibwa through their agent indicated that Stuart used bullying and outright deception to force the Ojibwa to accept the terms.

Kechewaishke signed and was recorded as Gichi waishkey, 1st chief of La Pointe. Writing in 1855, Morse describes Kechewaishke's "voice so potent at the treaty of '42." But three months after the treaty, Kechewaishke dictated a letter to the government in Washington D.C., saying he was "ashamed" of the way the treaty was conducted. He said that Stuart had refused to listen to any of the Ojibwa's objections, and asked to add a provision to ensure permanent Ojibwa reservations in Wisconsin.

The interpretation of the 1837 and 1842 treaties remains ambiguous, as the US government claimed the Ojibwa ceded title to the lands, and the Ojibwa claimed they ceded only resource rights. The government had said that the Ojibwa lands were unsuitable for farming and white settlement. The Ojibwa did obtain annuity payments to be paid each year at La Pointe, and reserved the right to hunt, fish, gather, and move across any lands outlined in the treaties. They obtained the promise that the nation would not be removed across the Mississippi River unless they somehow "misbehaved."

== Threats of removal ==
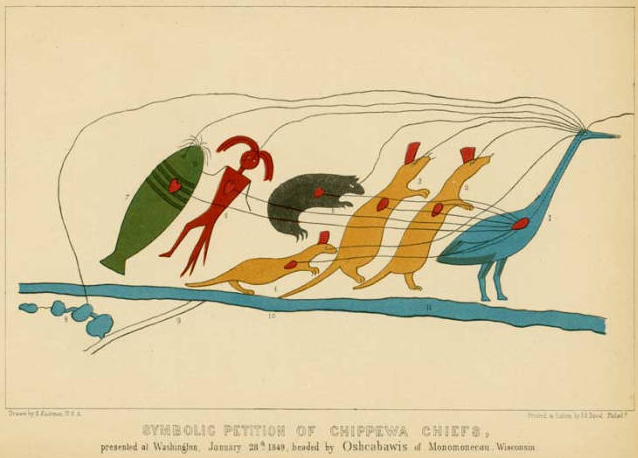
This pictographic 1849 petition, sometimes attributed to Buffalo, was presented to the U.S. president by Oshcabawis and other Ojibwa leaders from the headwaters of the Wisconsin River. It complains of broken promises in the 1837 and 1842 treaties. The tribes are represented by their totems: marten, bear, man and catfish, led by the crane. Lines running from the heart and eye of each animal to the heart and eye of the crane denote that they are all of one mind; and a line runs from the eye of the crane to the lakes, shown in the «map» in the lower left-hand corner.

In 1830, President Andrew Jackson signed the Indian Removal Act, which authorized the government to remove any Indian nations east of the Mississippi River to the western side and offer land in exchange. As northern Wisconsin was not then under pressure for development by white settlers, as occurred in the Southeast, the Ojibwa were not among the first targets of the act. They watched closely as the government used the territorial claims defined by tribes in 1825 to force numerous tribes in Indiana, southern Michigan and southern Wisconsin to move west to Kansas, Iowa, Minnesota, and Indian Territory, present-day Oklahoma. These included the Odawa and Potawatomi, two Anishinaabe tribes closely related to and allied with the Ojibwa.

In 1848, Wisconsin achieved statehood; Indian nations were under increased pressure for removal and marginalization. Corrupt US Indian agents controlled annuity payments, sometimes underpaying tribes, and took authority not granted them by the bands. They allowed white settlers to move onto Ojibwa lands and refused the Ojibwa the rights reserved by treaties. The Ojibwa complained to Jackson about the mistreatment and broken promises, but politicians were more apt to listen to western land speculators, who saw possibilities for profit in removing the Ojibwa to Minnesota.

Even with the treaties of 1837 and 1842, leaders worried about Ojibwa removal. Kechewaishke kept in constant contact with the other bands to ensure the Ojibwa upheld their obligations. He sent runners to all the bands to report back on any conduct that could construed as grounds for removal. Nothing was reported. But President Zachary Taylor signed the removal order on February 6, 1850, under corrupt circumstances, claiming to be protecting the Ojibwa from "injurious" whites. The Wisconsin legislature resisted the order and put aside plans for removal. Alexander Ramsey, the territorial governor of Minnesota, and Indian sub-agent John Watrous conspired on a plan to force the Ojibwa to Minnesota anyway, as the two men stood to gain personal economic and political benefits from removal.

== Sandy Lake Tragedy ==
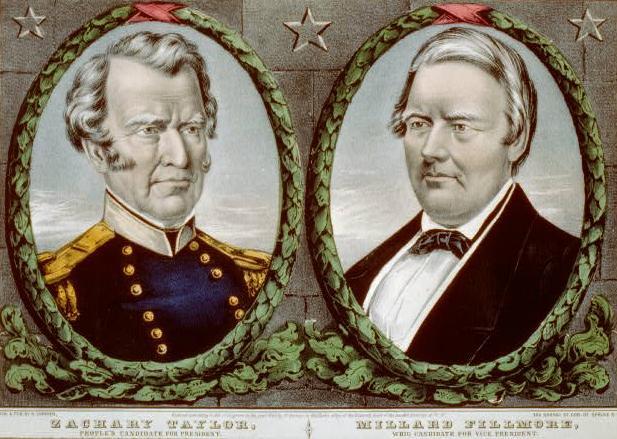
In 1850, President Zachary Taylor (left) signed the illegal order removing the Ojibwa to Sandy Lake. In 1852, after meeting with Kechewaishke, Taylor's successor Millard Fillmore (right) overturned the order

To force the Ojibwa to comply, Watrous announced he would pay future annuities only at Sandy Lake, Minnesota, instead of La Pointe, where they had been paid previously. This change resulted in the Sandy Lake Tragedy, when hundreds of Ojibwa starved or died of exposure in Minnesota and on the journey home because the promised annuity supplies were late, contaminated or inadequate.

In a later letter, Kechewaishke described the conditions:

And when a message was sent to me by our Indian agent to come and get our pay, I lost no time in arising & complying with my Agents voice and when I reached my point of destination, verily my Agent fed me with very bad flour it resembled green clay. Soon I became sick and many of my fellow chippewas also were taken sick, and soon the results were manifested by the death of over two hundred persons of my tribe, for this calamity, I laid blame to the provisions issued to us...

Back in La Pointe, Kechewaishke took several actions to forestall and prevent removal. He and other leaders petitioned the US government for the next two years to no avail. They did win considerable sympathy from whites who learned of the debacle in Sandy Lake. Newspapers throughout the Lake Superior region ran editorials condemning the removal effort. Kechewaishke sent two of his sons to St. Paul, where they obtained a portion of the annuities still owed.

Ramsey and Watrous continued to work to remove the Ojibwa to Sandy Lake. Watrous said they considered Sandy Lake a "graveyard," but he still tried to move all the bands to Fond du Lac. Young Ojibwa men in Wisconsin were outraged at these developments and the threat of violent revolt grew. Kechewaishke called on the services of his well-spoken sub-chief Oshoga, and son-in-law Benjamin G. Armstrong, a literate white interpreter married to his daughter. He drew up a petition that the 92-year-old Kechewaishke personally delivered to the president in Washington.

== Trip to Washington ==
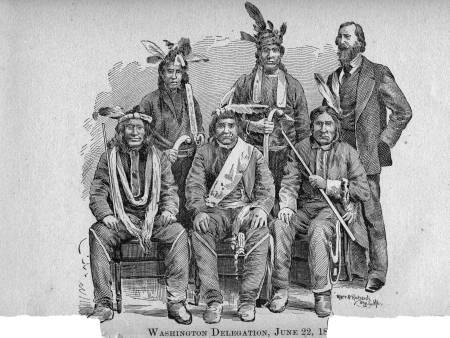
The Ojibwa delegation to Washington (1852).

After spring thaw in 1852, Kechewaishke, Oshaga, Armstrong, and four others set out from La Pointe for Washington, D.C. by birchbark canoe. Along the way, they stopped in towns and mining camps along the Michigan shore of Lake Superior, securing hundreds of signatures in support of their cause. At Sault Ste. Marie, they were held by the US Indian agent, who told them that no unauthorized Ojibwa delegations could go to Washington and they had to turn back. The men pleaded the urgency of their case and traveled to Detroit by steamship. There another Indian agent tried to stop them. Once allowed to proceed, they sailed through Lake Erie to Buffalo, New York and then on to Albany and New York City.

In New York City, the Ojibwa attracted attention, gaining publicity and money for their cause. But in Washington, they were turned away by the Bureau of Indian Affairs, and told they should never have come in the first place. Luckily, they drew the attention of the Whig Congressman Briggs from New York, who had a meeting with President Millard Fillmore scheduled for the next day. He invited the Ojibwa to come with him to see Fillmore. At the meeting, Kechewaishke rose first. He performed the pipe ceremony with a pipe made especially for the occasion. He had Oshaga speak for more than an hour about the broken treaty promises and the disastrous attempt at removal. Fillmore agreed to consider the issues. The next day, he announced that the removal order would be canceled, the payment of annuities would be returned to La Pointe, and another treaty would set up permanent reservations for the Ojibwa in Wisconsin.

The delegation traveled back to Wisconsin by rail, spreading the good news to the various Ojibwa bands as they went. Kechewaishke also announced that all tribal representatives should gather at La Pointe for payments the next summer (1853), and he would reveal the specifics of the agreement.

== 1854 Treaty and Buffalo estate ==
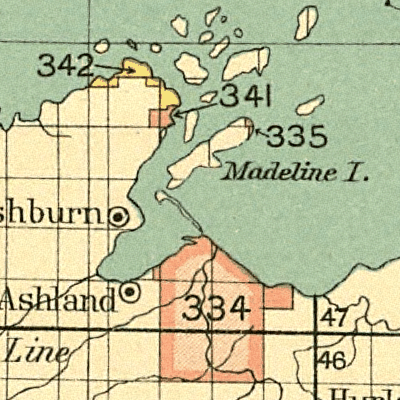
Map published by U.S. Congress (1899), shows main Bad River Reservation (#334) and Madeline Island fishing grounds (#335). The Buffalo Estate (#341) is shown with the rest of the Red Cliff Reservation (#342). Madeline Island and Chequamegon Point are visible in the center of the image.

As Fillmore promised, treaty commissioners arrived in La Pointe in 1854 to conclude a final treaty. Recalling the experiences of 1837 and 1842, Ojibwa leaders sought to control the negotiations in 1854. Ambiguity in those treaties had been partially to blame for ensuing problems, so Kechewaishke insisted he would accept no interpreter other than Armstrong, his adopted son. The Ojibwa insisted on a guarantee of the right to hunt, fish, and gather on all the ceded territory, and on the establishment on several reservations across western Upper Michigan, northern Wisconsin, and northeastern Minnesota. In his mid-nineties and in failing health, Kechewaishke directed the negotiations but left most of the speaking to other chiefs. He entrusted Armstrong with the details of the written version.

The reservations in Wisconsin were named the Lac Courte Oreilles Indian Reservation, and Lac du Flambeau Indian Reservation. The La Pointe Band was given a reservation at Bad River around the Band's traditional wild ricing grounds on Lake Superior's south shore, and some reserved land for fishing grounds at Madeline Island's eastern tip. In Minnesota, the reservations for the Fond du Lac and the Grand Portage bands were established, with pending negotiations promised for the Bois Forte Band. In Michigan, reservations for the Lac Vieux Desert, Ontonagon and L'Anse bands were established. The St. Croix and Sokaogon bands left the negotiations in protest and were excluded from the agreement.

A small tract of land was also set aside for Kechewaishke and his family at Buffalo Bay on the mainland across from Madeline Island at a place called Miskwaabikong (red rocks or cliffs). Many of the Catholic and mixed-blooded members of the La Pointe Band elected to settle there around Kechewaishke rather than at Bad River. In 1855, this settlement at the "Buffalo Estate" was acknowledged; it was extended by executive order into what is now the Red Cliff Indian Reservation.

== Death and legacy ==
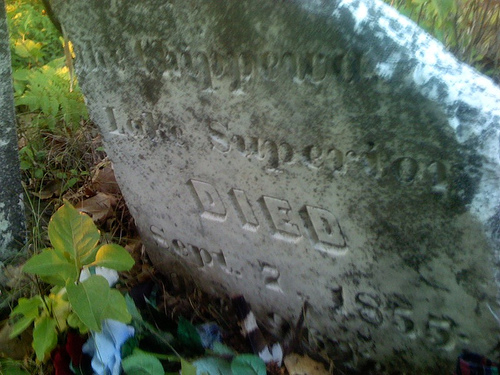
Kechewaishke's gravestone at La Pointe Indian Cemetery.

Kechewaishke was too ill to participate in the speeches at the time of the annuity payments in summer 1855. Tensions continued, as the Ojibwa accused US officials of corruption, members of the American Fur Company threatened violence, and infighting erupted among the Ojibwa bands. Morse records that these conflicts worsened Kechewaishke's condition. He died of heart disease on September 7, 1855, at La Pointe. Members of his band blamed his death on the government officials' conduct.

Kechewaishke was described as "head and the chief of the Chippewa Nation" and a man respected "for his rare integrity, wisdom in council, power as an orator, and magnanimity as a warrior." In his final hours he requested that his tobacco pouch and pipe be carried to Washington, D.C., and given to the government. His funeral was conducted in military fashion, with volleys fired at intervals in his honor.

Kechewaishke is regarded a hero of the Lake Superior Ojibwa. Those at Red Cliff also remember him as a founding figure of the community. His life is celebrated during commemorations of the treaty signings and the Sandy Lake Tragedy. He is buried in the La Pointe Indian Cemetery, near the deep, cold waters of Ojibwe Gichigami (Lake Superior), the "great freshwater-sea of the Ojibwa." His descendants, many going by the surname "Buffalo," are widespread in Red Cliff and Bad River.

Beginning in 1983, during treaty conflicts known as the Wisconsin Walleye War, Kechewaishke's name was frequently invoked as one who refused to give up his homeland and tribal sovereignty.

== See also ==
- Chief Oshkosh
- Beautifying Bird
- Biauswah (disambiguation)
- John Okemos
- Walter Bresette
