= Mille Lacs Indians =

The Mille Lacs Indians (Ojibwe: Misi-zaaga'iganiwininiwag), also known as the Mille Lacs and Snake River Band of Chippewa, are a Band of Indians formed from the unification of the Mille Lacs Band of Mississippi Chippewa (Ojibwe) with the Mille Lacs Band of Mdewakanton Sioux (Dakota). Today, their successor apparent Mille Lacs Band of Ojibwe consider themselves as being Ojibwe, but many on their main reservation have the ma'iingan (wolf) as their chief doodem (clan), which is an indicator of Dakota origins.

Mille Lacs Indians, because of their mixed Chippewa-Sioux heritage, have become the cultural lynch-pin linking the two former warring nations into a single people, providing Ojibwe culture and customs to the Dakota just as providing Dakota culture and customs to the Ojibwe. All of the drums held among the Mille Lacs Indians are of Dakota origins, singing Dakota melodies but translated into Ojibwe.

== Historical component bands ==
=== Mille Lacs Band of Mdewakanton Dakota ===
Previous to Ojibwe settlement after their prophetic migration from the Atlantic coast, this area was occupied for centuries by the Bdewaḳanṭuŋwaŋ ("Mdewakanton") Dakota, the western sub-division of the Isanti Dakota. The Bdewaḳanṭuŋwaŋ lived primarily on the three ricing chain of lakes (Ogechie, Shakopee and Onamia) at the head-waters of the Rum River and along the southern and southwestern shores of Mille Lacs Lake (citation?). With the Battle of Kathio, the Bdewaḳanṭuŋwaŋ were forced south and west. One independent historian has claimed that, despite resource access hardship due to conflicts between the Dakota and Ojibwe peoples, the Mille Lacs Band of Bdewaḳanṭuŋwaŋ Dakota remained in the area. According to this claim, a Dakota Council came to meet with the Ojibwe on terms of territorial control shifts, and the Mille Lacs Band of Bdewaḳanṭuŋwaŋ Dakota chose to remain and forgo their Dakota identity to become Ojibwe and remain at mde waḳaŋ (Spiritual/Mystic Lake). As Ojibwe, Mille Lacs Band of Bdewaḳanṭuŋwaŋ Dakota ensured the ceremonies associated with the Mille Lacs Lake were continued, forming the "Wolf Clan". This claim has, however, been refuted by Dakota and Anishinaabe tribal historians, and there is no documentation to support it.

=== Mille Lacs Band of Border-sitter Chippewa ===
Second group forming the Mille Lacs Indians were the Mille Lacs Band of Border-sitter Chippewa, Band of the Border-sitter sub-nation of the Lake Superior Chippewa. The Mille Lacs Band of Border-sitter Chippewa were part of the western division of the Border-sitter Chippewa known as the Manoominikeshiinyag or the "Ricing Rails" or the "St. Croix Division". Mille Lacs Band of Border-sitter lived primarily along Groundhouse River, Ann River, Knife River (all located south of Mille Lacs Lake, and tributaries of the Snake River), the portage ways connecting these three rivers to Mille Lacs Lake and the Rum River, and along the southeastern shores of Mille Lacs Lake. This group already were a mixed Dakota-Ojibwe entity, identifying themselves equally as Dakota and as Ojibwe.

=== Mille Lacs Band of Mississippi Chippewa ===
Third group forming the Mille Lacs Indians were the Mille Lacs Band of Mississippi Chippewa, a band associated with the powerful Mississippi Chippewa. Mille Lacs Band of Mississippi Chippewa lived primarily along Nokasippi River, Cedar River and Ripple River (all located north and northwest of Mille Lacs Lake), the portage ways connecting these three rivers to Mille Lacs Lake, and along the northwestern and northern shores of Mille Lacs Lake.

=== Pre-treaty period (c. 1750–1825) ===
The unification process among the three component historical bands began in ernest after the Battle of Kathio in which the Mille Lacs Band of Mississippi Chippewa gained majority control of the Mille Lacs Lake. In the Battle of Kathio, majority of the Dakota peoples were removed from the Mille Lacs Lake area and generally forced southward and westward from Lake. However, due to the sacredness of mde wáḳaŋ (Mille Lacs Lake), a peace council ending the territorial conflicts between the Ojibwe and Dakota was held on Mozomanie Point on the south end of the Lake, according to oral traditions, about 1750. At this peace council, the Ojibwe and the Dakota present were given a choice, where the Dakota peoples remaining would be peacefully incorporated as Ojibwe, but the Ojibwe would have to maintain all the rites associated with the Lake to maintain the sacredness of this body of water. In agreement, the Ojibwe learned all the Dakota ceremonial dances and songs over the course of the entire summer, while the remaining Dakota became "Ojibwe". As the distinct "Ojibwe" and "Dakota" identification no longer was appropriate, the unified entity became the Misi-zaaga'iganiwininiwag or the "Mille Lacs Indians". The traditional location for the joint council of the many sub-bands of the Mille Lacs Indians was maintained at Zaagawaamikaag-wiidwedong (or Zaagawaaming, for short), just as it was with Mdewáḳaŋtuŋwaŋ Oyate before. Zaagawaaming, recorded as "Sagawamick" or "Sagawahmick" in various Bureau of Indian Affairs and Bureau of American Ethnology documents, still exists to this day but evolved into the Village of Lawrence and later as the City of Wahkon. However, with the establishment of the Mille Lacs Band of Ojibwe, the center of tribal government shifted to north and west to Vineland.

=== Treaty period (1825–1871) ===
The Mille Lacs Indians entered the treaty period by sending Chief Nayquonabe (from the Ojibwe Negwanebi, "'Tallest' [Quill]feather") to the 1825 Council for the First Treaty of Prairie du Chien (7 Stat. 272). Mille Lacs Indians participated in the 1826 Council for the Treaty of Fond du Lac. As part of the Biitan-akiing-enabijig Ojibwe, Mille Lacs Indians ceded great tract of land in Minnesota and Wisconsin in the 1837 Treaty of St. Peters (7 Stat. 536), but retained usufruct rights for hunting, fishing and gathering. As part of the Mdewakanton Dakota, Mille Lacs Indians ceded lands in the 1837 Treaty of Washington. Together with the Lake Superior Chippewa, the Mille Lacs Indians ceded lands in northern Wisconsin and western Upper Peninsula of Michigan in the 1842 Treaty of La Pointe, then in central Minnesota in the 1847 Treaty of Fond du Lac.

Together with the Pillager Chippewas and other Mississippi Chippewas in the 1855 Treaty of Washington (10 Stat. 1165), Mille Lacs Indians ceded large tract of land in northern Minnesota, excluding the Arrowhead Region (which its claim was rescinded in the 1854 Treaty of La Pointe) and the northwesternmost corner of Minnesota; in exchange, the Mille Lacs Indian reserved for themselves the south shore of Mille Lacs Lake, becoming the Mille Lacs Indian Reservation. However, as this land reserved was previously ceded to the United States in the 1837 Treaty of St. Peters, this caused a dispute between the lumbermen in the area and the Mille Lacs Indians. As the lumbermen had constructed a dam in Ericksonville, [and that location near the outlet of Lake Onamia was called Gibakwa'iganiing (By the Dam) or Gibakwa'igaansing (By the Little Dam) by the Ojibwe] to regulate the water flow of the Rum River for floating logs down the river, but the damming of the water threatened the wild rice in Lake Onamia, the Mille Lacs Indians removed the dam. This became the first court case for the Mille Lacs Indians, in 1856, the US Supreme Court judged in favor of the tribe.

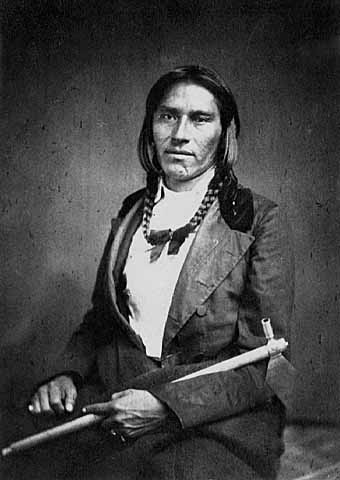
Chief Hole in the Day

With the Dakota War of 1862, many Chippewa Bands aided the Dakota people. When Mille Lacs Indians Chief Máza-mani (Iron-Walker) learned of the plans of Gull Lake Band Chief Bagonegiizhig (Hole in the Day) to attack Fort Ripley, Chief Máza-mani raised a party of 200 men and they set out to aid the fort in advance, thus averting Chief Bagonegiizhig's attack on the fort.

In the 1863 Treaty of Washington (12 Stat. 1249) and again in 1864 (13 Stat. 693), while most all other Chippewa Bands were being forced to relocate due to their aid to the Dakota people, Mille Lacs Indians, due to their aid to the United States, were not. As stated in the Treaties, "That owing to the heretofore good conduct of the Mille Lac Indians, they shall not be compelled to remove so long as they shall not in any way interfere with or in any manner molest the property of persons of the whites."

=== Post-treaty period (1872–1936) ===
When the White Earth Indian Reservation was established, like the rest of the Mississippi Chippewa, the Mille Lacs Indians were also encouraged to relocate. Many Mille Lacs Indians became homeless so under 30 Stat. 745, homesteading and cemetery lands were secured for the Mille Lacs Indians. After the signing of the "An act for the relief and civilization of the Chippewa Indians in the State of Minnesota" (51st-1st-Ex.Doc.247) and a removal bill on May 27, 1902, many Mille Lacs Indians did remove themselves to the White Earth Indian Reservation, becoming the Removable Mille Lacs Band. Others remained on the Mille Lacs Indian Reservation, becoming the Non-removable Mille Lacs Band. Within few years, many of the Removable Mille Lacs Band left White Earth and returned to Mille Lacs, splitting the group onto two separate Indian Reservations.

When the BIA asked for a consultation council to be held in Hayward, Wisconsin, regards to the 1934 Indian Reorganization Act, Mille Lacs Indians sent delegates there without signature authority to gather information.

When the Minnesota Chippewa Tribe was established in 1936 under the authority of the Indian Reorganization Act, the Non-removable and Removable Mille Lacs Bands of the Mille Lacs Indians became the core Band of the Mille Lacs Band of Ojibwe, joined together with the Non-removable Sandy Lake Band of Mississippi Chippewa, Rice Lake Band of Mississippi Chippewa, and the communities of the St. Croix Chippewa Indians of Minnesota.

== Notable Mille Lacs Indians ==
- Adik ("Reindeer", recorded as "A-dick")
- Akiwenziinh ("Old Man", recorded as "Aw-ke-wain-ze"), brave
- Akogwan ("Deep [Coloured] Feather", recorded as "A-ko-gwan"), chief
- Awan ("Fog", recorded as "A-wun")
- Ayizhi'indang ("He is Encouraged", recorded as "A-ya-shin-ting")
- Ayaabe ("Buck", recorded as "Ai-a-be"), chief
- Aanji-bines ("Changing Bird", recorded as "Aun-che-be-nos"), second warrior
- Aazhoo ("Distant [Walk, Called Chinaman]", recorded as "A-zhu"), cultural informant
- Badagwigiizhig ("All [Cloud-]covered Sky", recorded as "Bu-dub-i-gi-zhig")
- Bwaanens ("Little Sioux", recorded as "Bwan-ens"), cultural informant
- Biidwaabanookwe ("Peep o' Dawn", recorded as "Bi-da-bun-o-que")
- Debab ("Sit Enough", recorded as "De-dub"), cultural informant
- Debas ("Dodger", recorded as "De-bus"), cultural informant
- Debwe ("[He who Tells the] Truth", recorded as "Deb-we"), cultural informant
- Edawi-giizhig ("Both Ends of the Sky", recorded as "Ad-a-we-ge-shik"), warrior
- Eshpaan ("Great Height", recorded as "Aish-pun"), head man
- Gaagige-aanakwadweb ("[Sits on an] Everlasting Cloud", recorded as "Ka-gi-ge-an-a-quut-web")
- Gaa-giizhitang ("Finished", recorded as "Ga-ki-zhi-tung")
- Gegwedose ("Try Walking", recorded as "Gay-gway-do-say")
- Gekekwab ("[Sitting on a] Sparrow[hawk]", recorded as "Ka-ka-quap"), warrior
- Gichi-bine ("Big Quail", recorded as "Ki-chi-bin-e")
- Gidagigwan ("Spotted Feather", recorded as "Ge-tug-i-gwun")
- Gimiwan-aanakwad ("Rain Cloud", recorded as "Ge-me-wan-na-na-quad")
- Gii-niizh ("Two'd", recorded as "Gi-nizh")
- Ishkwaandem ("Door", recorded as "Ish-guam-den")
- Ishpiming ("Heaven", recorded as "Ish-pi-ming")
- Iinzan ("Apparently", recorded as "In-zahn"), chief
- Jiichiibizens ("He who Quakes [a Little]", recorded as "Chi-bi-zains"), cultural informant
- Jiingogaabaw ("Who Shakes [the Earth] by Standing", recorded as "Ching-o-ga-bow"), cultural informant
- Makode' ("Bear's Heart", recorded as "Mah-ko-dah"), first warrior
- Manoominikeshiinh ("Ricing Rail", recorded as "Mun-o-min-e-kay-shein, Ricemaker"), chief
- Máza-mani ("Iron-walker" (Dakota name), recorded as "Mo-zo-man-e, Many Moose"), chief
- Migizi ("Bald Eagle", recorded as "Mee-gee-zee"), chief
- Mino-giizhig ("Fine Day", recorded as "Me-no-ke-shick")
- Negwanebi ("'Tallest' [Quill]feather" or "Feather's End", recorded as "Nay-quon-a(y)-be", "Na-gwun-a-bee" or "Na-gwa-na-be"), chief
- Ozaawandib ("Yellow Head", recorded as "O-za-wan-dib"), chief
- Pítad ("[Morsel of] Muskrat-liver" (Dakota name), recorded as "Be-dud"), warrior
- Wazhashkokon ("[Musk]rat's Liver", recorded as "Wa-shask-ko-kone"), chief
- Zaagajiw ("Comes out of the Mountain", recorded as "Sa-gutch-u"), chief
- Zhaaboshkang ("He who Passes Through", recorded as "Shaw-bosh-kung"), chief

== See also ==
- United States v. Mille Lac Band of Chippewa Indians, 229 U.S. 498 (1913)
- United States v. Minnesota, 270 U.S. 181 (1926)
