= Treaty of Fond du Lac =

1826 and 1847 treaties between the United States and Ojibwe

The Treaty of Fond du Lac may refer to either of two treaties made and signed in Duluth, Minnesota between the United States and the Ojibwe (Chippewa) Native American peoples.

== 1826 Treaty of Fond du Lac ==
The first treaty of Fond du Lac was signed by Lewis Cass and Thomas L. McKenney for the United States and representatives of the Ojibwe of Lake Superior and the Mississippi on August 5, 1826, proclaimed on February 7, 1827, and codified in the United States Statutes at Large as 7 Stat. 290. The Ojibwe chiefs who were not in attendance to the First Treaty of Prairie du Chien agreed to its adhesion. The Ojibwe Nations granted to the United States the rights to minerals exploration and mining within Ojibwe lands located north of the Prairie du Chien Line. Provisions were also made for the Ojibwe living about Saint Mary's River. As addenda to this treaty, arrest warrants to certain individuals living outside the jurisdiction of the United States were issued and land grants to the Métis were made.

=== Signatories ===
| # | Location | Recorded name | Name (Translation/"Alias") |
|---|---|---|---|
| 01 | St. Marys | Shin-gau-ba Was-sin | Zhingaabewasin (Image Stone) (Note: Portraited by Bird as "SHIN-GA-BA-W'OSSIN or IMAGE STONE") |
| 02 | St. Marys | She-wau-be-ke-toan | Zhiiwaabikitoon (Jingles) |
| 03 | St. Marys | Way-ish-kee | |
| 04 | St. Marys | Shee-gud | Miishigaad (Hairy Leg) |
| 05 | St. Croix Band | Pee-zhick-ee | Bizhiki (Buffalo) |
| 06 | St. Croix Band | No-den | Noodin (Wind) (Note: Portraited by Bird as "NO-TIN") |
| 07 | St. Croix Band | Na-gwun-a-bee | Negwanebi ("Tallest" [Quill]feather) |
| 08 | St. Croix Band | Kau-be-map-pa | Gaa-biimabi (He that sits to the side/"Wet Mouth") |
| 09 | St. Croix Band | Chau-co-pee | Zhaagobe (Six) ("Jack-O-Pa") |
| 10 | St. Croix Band | Jau-beance | [A]yaabens (Little Buck) |
| 11 | St. Croix Band | Ul-tau-wau (Note: "Ul-tau-wau" should be "Ut-tau-wau") | Odaawaa (Trader/"Ottawa") |
| 12 | St. Croix Band | My-een-gun-sheens | Ma'iinganzhiins (Little Bad-Wolf) |
| 13 | St. Croix Band | Moa-so-mo-nee | Máza-máni (Ironwalker) (Note: Name given in Dakota language) |
| 14 | St. Croix Band | Muck-u-day peenaas | Makade-bines (Black Bird) |
| 15 | St. Croix Band | Shee-wee-tau-gun | Zhiiwitaagan (Salt) |
| 16 | La Pointe Band | Pee-xhick-ee | Bizhiki (Buffalo) |
| 17 | La Pointe Band | Kee-mee-wun | Gimiwan (Rain) |
| 18 | La Pointe Band | Kau-bu-zo-way | |
| 19 | La Pointe Band | Wy-au-wee-nind | Wayaa-wiinind (One Who Will Be Named) |
| 20 | La Pointe Band | Pee-kwauk-wo-to-an-se-kay | Bikwaakodowaanzige (Ball of Dye) |
| 21 | Lac Courte Oreilles Band | Pay-baum-ik-o-way | |
| 22 | Lac du Flambeau Band | Gitshee Waubeeshaans | Gichi-waabizhesh (Big Marten) |
| 23 | Lac du Flambeau Band | Moa-zo-nee | Moozonii (Moose People) |
| 24 | Lac du Flambeau Band | Git-shee Mi-gee-zee | Gichi-migizi (Great Eagle) |
| 25 | Lac du Flambeau Band | Mi-zhau-quot | Mizhakwad (Clear Sky) |
| 26 | Ontonagon | Keesh-kee-to-wug | Giishkitawag (Cut Ear) |
| 27 | Ontonagon | Pee-nay-see | Binesi (Bird) |
| 28 | Ontonagon | Mau-tau-gu-mee | Madaagami (Choppy Waters) |
| 29 | Ontonagon | Kwee-wee-zais-ish | Gwiiwizhenzhish (Bad Boy) |
| 30 | Vermilion Lake | At-tick-o-ans | Adikoons (Little Elk) |
| 31 | Vermilion Lake | Gy-ut-shee-in-i-nee | Gayaachiinh-inini (Small Man) |
| 32 | Vermilion Lake | Jauk-way | [O]jaakwe (Has a Soul) |
| 33 | Vermilion Lake | Mad-wag-ku-na-gee-zhig-waab | |
| 34 | Vermilion Lake | Jau-ko-gee-zhig-waish-kun | Jaagogiizhigweshkang (Treads Against the Sky) |
| 35 | Vermilion Lake | Nee-zbo-day (Note: "Nee-zbo-day" should be "Nee-zho-day") | Niizhoodenh (Twin) |
| 36 | Vermilion Lake | Nun-do-chee-ais | |
| 37 | Vermilion Lake | O-gee-mau-gee-gid | |
| 38 | Vermilion Lake | An-nee-mee-kees | Animikiins (Little Thunder) |
| 39 | Ontonagon | Kau-waish-kung | Gaaweshkaang (Moves Homeward) |
| 40 | Ontonagon | Mau-tau-gu-mee | Madaagami (Choppy Waters) |
| 41 | Snake River | Way-mit-te-goash | Wemitigoozh (Frenchman) |
| 42 | Snake River | Isk-quag-wun-aa-bee | Ishkwaagwanebi (End [Quill]feather) |
| 43 | Snake River | Mee-gwun-aus | Miigwanens (Little Feather) |
| 44 | Lac du Flambeau Band | Pa-moos-say | Bemose (Walking) |
| 45 | Lac du Flambeau Band | May-tau-koos-ee-gay | Metaakozige ([Smokes] Pure Tobacco) (Note: Portraited by Bird as "META-KOOSEGA or PURE TOBACCO") |
| 46 | Rainy Lake | Aa-nub-kum-ig-ish-kunk (Note: "Aa-nub-kum-ig-ish-kunk" should be "Aa-nuh-kum-ig-ish-kunk") | Aanakamigishkaang ([Traces of] Foot Prints [upon the Ground]) |
| 47 | Sandy Lake Band | O-sau-mem-i-kee | Ozaawinimikii (Yellow Thunder) |
| 48 | Sandy Lake Band | Git-shee Way-mir-tee-go-ost (Note: "Git-shee Way-mir-tee-go-ost" should be "Git-shee Way-mit-tee-go-osh") | Gichi-wemitigoozh (Big Frenchman) |
| 49 | Sandy Lake Band | Paa-shu-nin-leel (Note: "Paa-shu-nin-leel" should be "Paa-shu-in-in-ee.") | Beshaa-inini (Striped-man) |
| 50 | Sandy Lake Band | Wau-zhus-ko-kok | Wazhashkokon (Muskrat's Liver) |
| 51 | Sandy Lake Band | Nit-um-o-gau-bow-ee | Netamigaabawi (Stands First) |
| 52 | Sandy Lake Band | Wat-tap | Wadab (Spunk) |
| 53 | Fond du Lac Band | Shin-goop | Zhingob (Spruce) |
| 54 | Fond du Lac Band | Mon-e-to-gee-zi-so-ans | Manidoo-giiziswens (Little Sun-Spirit) |
| 55 | Fond du Lac Band | Mong-a-zid | Maangozid (Loon's Foot) |
| 56 | Fond du Lac Band | Ma-ne-to-gee-zhig | Manidoo-giizhig (Sky Spirit) |
| 57 | Fond du Lac Band | O-jau-nee-mau-son | |
| 58 | Fond du Lac Band | Mis-kwau-tais | Miskwaades ([Painted] Turtle) |
| 59 | Fond du Lac Band | Nau-bu-nay-ger-zhig | Nabane-giizhig (One-side of the Sky) |
| 60 | Fond du Lac Band | Un-nau-wau-bun-daun | Aanawaabandan (Look in Despair) |
| 61 | Fond du Lac Band | Pau-tau-bay | |
| 62 | Fond du Lac Band | Mi-gee-see | Migizi (Eagle) |
| 63 | Ontonagon | Waub-ish-kee-pee-naas | Waabishki-bines (White Bird) |
| 64 | Ontonagon | Tweesh-tweesh-kee-way | Jwiichwiishkiwenh (Plover) |
| 65 | Ontonagon | Kun-de-kund | Okandikan (Bouy) |
| 66 | Ontonagon | O-guh-bay-au-nuh-quot-way-bee | Ogabe-aanakwadwebi (Sit Upon The Cloud's End) |
| 67 | Ontonagon | Pay-bau-mau-sing | Bebaamaasing (Blown About) |
| 68 | Ontonagon | Keesh-kee-mun | Giishkimon (Whetstone/"Sharpened Knife") |
| 69 | Crow Wing River | Mau-gu-gau-bo-wie | |
| 70 | Crow Wing River | Pu-dud | Pítad (Muskrat's Liver) (Note: Name given in Dakota language) |
| 71 | Crow Wing River | Naug-du-nosh (Note: "Naug-du-nosh" should be "Naug-au-nosh") | Naaganaash (Leads by the Wind) |
| 72 | Crow Wing River | O-zhus-kuck-oen | Wazhashkokon (Muskrat's Liver) |
| 73 | Crow Wing River | Waub-o-gee | Waabojiig (White Fisher) |
| 74 | Crow Wing River | Saw-ba-nosh | |
| 75 | Crow Wing River | Kee-way-den | Giiwedin (North [Wind]) |
| 76 | Crow Wing River | Git-shee-mee-win-i-nee | |
| 77 | Crow Wing River | Wy-nu-nee | |
| 78 | Crow Wing River | O-bu-mau-gee-zhig | |
| 79 | Crow Wing River | Pay-bou-mid-gee-wung | Bebaamijiwang (Meandering Current) |
| 80 | Crow Wing River | Mau-gee-gau-bou | Maajigaabawi (Starts to Stand/"Stepping Ahead") |
| 81 | Crow Wing River | Pay-bau-mo-gee-zhig | Bebaamogiizhig (Sky Rambling) |
| 82 | Crow Wing River | Kau-be-map-pa | Gaa-bimabi (He that sits to the side) |
| 83 | Crow Wing River | Way-mit-te-goa-zhu | Wemitigoozhi (Frenchman) |
| 84 | Crow Wing River | On-ju-pe-naas | Aanji-bines (Changing Bird) |
| 85 | Crow Wing River | Mad-way-os-sin | Madwewasin (Hears Stones) |

== 1847 Treaty of Fond du Lac ==
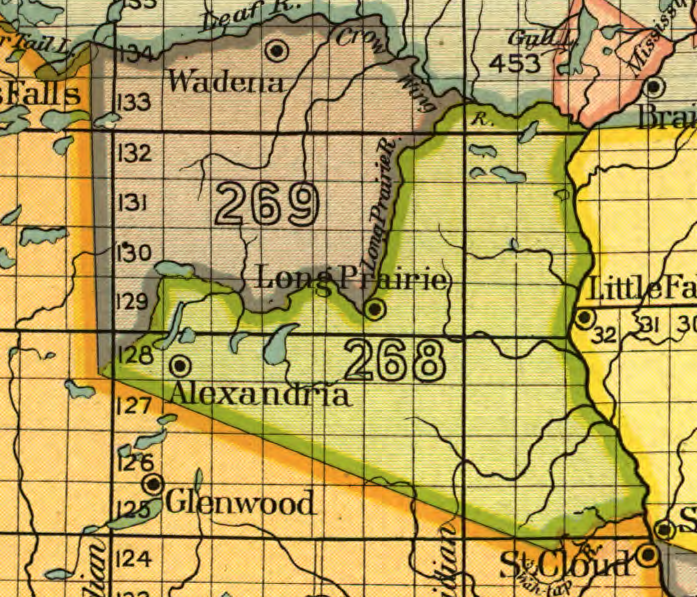
Land ceded by the treaty of Fond du Lac in 1847, designated 268 (green) on the map.

The second treaty of Fond du Lac was signed by Issac A. Verplank and Henry Mower Rice for the United States and representatives of the Ojibwe of Lake Superior and the Mississippi on August 2, 1847, proclaimed on April 7, 1848, and codified as 9 Stat. 904. This treaty ceded lands in a triangular area west of the Mississippi River, bounded by the Prairie du Chien Line, Mississippi River, Crow Wing River and Long Prairie River.

According to the oral histories of the Mille Lacs Band of Ojibwe, representatives from the Ho-Chunk Nation negotiated with the Lake Superior and Mississippi Chippewas before treaty discussions with the United States took place to guarantee the safety of the Ho-Chunk Nation which was about to be displaced from the Neutral Ground with the admission of much of Iowa Territory into the Union as the State of Iowa, in their Treaty of Washington (1846). The Ho-Chunk were supposed to be removed to the land ceded by the two 1847 Ojibwe treaties along the Long Prairie River (now in Minnesota). Many refused. Some fled to Wisconsin and some to Nebraska. The balance were removed to Minnesota in 1848 and a second removal occurred in 1850 which brought in another portion of the Ho-Chunk to the area. Due to frequent skirmishes by Ojibwe and Dakota bands against one another the Ho-Chunk could not avoid being attacked at times. The Ho-Chunk were unhappy with the land and were eventually relocated to an area near the Blue Earth River in southern Minnesota in 1855. After the Dakota rose up against whites in 1862 and the U.S.-Dakota war caused depopulation of southern Minnesota, many remaining Minnesota citizens were in no mood to allow the Ho-Chunk Nation to remain in the state, despite their neutrality during the hostilities. The Winnebago subsequently ceded their Minnesota lands to the United States per Treaty of Washington (1865) for relocation to South Dakota and then Nebraska. Meanwhile, the Ojibwe land ceded in 1847 remained in U.S. government hands and was eventually opened up to white settlement.

=== Signatories ===
| # | Location | Recorded Name | Name (Translation/"Alias") | Title |
|---|---|---|---|---|
| 1 | Crow Wing | Kai-ah-want-e-da (Note: "Kai-ah-want-e-da" should be "Kat-ah-waub-e-da") | Gaa-dawaabide (Cracked Tooth/"Broken Tooth") | 2d chief |
| 2 | Gull Lake | Waub-o-jceg (Note: "Waub-o-jceg" should be "Waub-o-jeeg") | Waabojiig (White Fisher) | 1st chief |
| 3 | Crow Wing | Ut-tom-auh | Odaawaa (Ottawa) | 1st warrior |
| 4 | Crow Wing | Shen-goob | Zhingob (Spruce) | 1st warrior |
| 5 | Gull Lake | Que-wish-an-sish | Gwiiwizhenzhish (Bad Boy) | 1st warrior |
| 6 | Crow Wing | Maj-c-gah-bon (Note: "Maj-c-gah-bon" should be "Maj-e-gah-boh") | Maajigaabaw (Start to Stand) | 2d warrior |
| 7 | Crow Wing | Kag-gag-c-we-guon (Note: "Kag-gag-c-we-guon" should be "Kag-gag-e-we-guon") | Gaagaagiwigwan (Raven's Feather) | warrior |
| 8 | Crow Wing | Mab uk-um-ig (Note: "Mab uk-um-ig" should be "Wab-uk-um-ig") | Waabakamig (White Ground) | warrior |
| 9 | Sandy Lake Band | Nag-aun-cg-a-bon (Note: "Nag-aun-cg-a bon" should be "Nag-aun-eg-a-bow") | Naagaanigaabaw (Stand in Front) | 2d chief |
| 10 | Sandy Lake Band | Wan-jc-ke-shig-uk (Note: "Wan-jc-ke-shig-uk" should be "Wan-je-ke-shig-uk") | Wenji-giizhigak (From the Sky) | chief |
| 11 | Sandy Lake Band | Kow-az-rum-ig-ish-kung (Note: "Kow-az-rum-ig-ish-kung" should be "Kow-day-cum-ig-ish-kung") | [I]kaadekamigishkang (Earth Opens) | warrior |
| 12 | La Pointe Band | Ke-che-wask-keenk | Gichi-weshkiinh (Great Renewer) | 1st chief |
| 13 | St. Croix Lake | Gab-im-ub-be | Gaa-biimabi (He that sits to the side/"Wet Mouth") | chief |
| 14 | Pelican Lakes | Kee-che-waub-ish-ash | Gichi-waabizhesh (Big Marten) | 1st chief |
| 15 | Pelican Lakes | Nig-gig | Nigig (Otter) | 2d chief |
| 16 | Lac du Flambeau Band | Ud-c-kum-ag (Note: "Ud-c-kum-ag" should be "Ud-e-kum-ag") | Adikameg (Whitefish) | 2d chief |
| 17 | La Pointe Band | Ta-che-go-onk (Note: "Ta-che-go-onk" should be "Ja-che-gee-uh") | Jechiikwii'o (Snipe) | 3d chief |
| 18 | La Pointe Band | Muk-no-a-wuk-und (Note: "Muk-no-a-wuk-und" should be "Muk-ud-a-un-uk-wud") | Makadewaanakwad (Black Cloud) | warrior |
| 19 | St. Croix Band | O-sho-gaz | Ashagens (Little Heron) | warrior |
| 20 | La Pointe Band | A-dow-c-re-shig (Note: "A-dow-c-re-shig" should be "A-dow-e-ke-shig") | Edaawi-giizhig (Both Ends of the Sky) | warrior |
| 21 | La Pointe Band | Keesh-ri-tow-ng (Note: "Keesh-ri-tow-ng" should be "Keesh-ki-tow-ug") | Giishkitawag (Cut Ear) | 1st warrior |
| 22 | Rice Lake Band | I-aub-ans | Ayaabens (Little Buck) | chief |
| 23 | La Pointe Band | Tug-wany-am-az (Note: "Tug-wany-am-az" should be "Tug-waug-aun-ay") | Dagwagaane (Two Lodges Meet) | 2d chief |
| 24 | Ontonagon Band | O-rum-de-kun (Note: "O-rum-de-kun" should be "O-kun-de-kun") | Okandikan (Bouy) | chief |
| 25 | Ontonagon | Keesh-re-tow-no (Note: "Keesh-re-tow-no" should be "Keesh-ke-tow-uc") | Giishkitawag (Cut Ear) | 2d chief |
| 26 | Pokegama | Maj-c-wo-we-clung (Note: "Maj-c-wo-we-clung" should be "Maj-e-wa-we-dung") | Maajiwewidang (Starts Speaking) | 2d chief |
| 27 | Pokegama | Ke-che-wa-mib-co-osk (Note: "Ke-che-wa-mib-co-osk" should be "Ke-che-wa-mi-te-co-osh") | Gichi-wemitigoozh (Big Frenchman) | 1st chief |
| 28 | Fond du Lac Band | Mongo-o-sit | Maangozid (Loon's Foot) | 3d chief |
| 29 | Fond du Lac Band | Mug-un-ub (Note: "Mug-un-ub" should be "Nug-un-ub") | Naagaanab (Foremost Sitter) | 2d chief |
| 30 | Fond du Lac Band | An-im-as-ung | Enimaasing (Sails Away) | 1st warrior |
| 31 | Chippewa River | Waub-ish-ashe | Waabizheshi (Marten) | 1st chief |
| 32 | Chippewa River | Make-cen-gun (Note: "Make-cen-gun" should be "Mah-een-gun") | Ma'iingan (Wolf) | 2d chief |
| 33 | Lac Courte Oreilles Band | Kee-wan-see | [A]kiwenzii (Old Man) | chief |
| 34 | Puk-wa-wun | Ten-as-see (Note: "Ten-as-see" should be "Pen-as-see") | Binesi (Bird) | chief |
| 35 | Lac Courte Oreilles Band | Nag-an-is | Naagaaniz (Leader) | 2d chief |
| 36 | Puk-wa-wun | Ke-chi-in-in-e | Gichi-inini (Big Man) | 1st warrior |
| 37 | Turtle Portage | Ke-che-now-uj-c-nim | Gichi-naawajiwan (Big Midst the Rapids) | chief |
| 38 | Lac du Flambeau Band | Bus-e-guin-jis | Bazigwinjiz (Arise) | warrior |
| 39 | Fond du Lac Band | Shin-goob | Zhingob (Spruce) | 1st chief |
| 40 | Grand Portage Band | Shay-u-ash-cens (Note: "Shay-u-ash-cens" should be "Shag-un-ash-eens") | Zhaaganaashiins (Little Englishman) | 1st chief |
| 41 | Grand Portage Band | Ud-ik-ons | Adikoons (Little Elk) | 2d chief |
| 42 | La Pointe Band | Me-zye | Mizay (Eel) | 4th chief |
| 43 | L'Anse Band | | David King | 1st chief |
| 44 | L'Anse Band | Ma-tak-o-se-ga | Metaakozige ([Smokes] Pure Tobacco) | 1st warrior |
| 45 | L'Anse Band | Assurcens (Note: "Assurcens" should be "Asseneens") | Asiniins (Little Rock) | 2d warrior |
| 46 | L'Anse Band | | Peter Marksman | chief |
| 47 | | | Alexander Corbin | chief |
| 48 | | William W. W. Warren | William W. Warren | 1st chief |
| 49 | | Jno. Pta. Rellenger | Jean-Baptise Reyergé | |
| 50 | | | Charles Charlo | |
| 51 | Lac Courte Oreilles Half-breeds | Battiste Gauthier | Baptiste Gauthier | Chief |
| 52 | La Pointe Band Half-breeds | | Vincent Roy | Chief |
| 53 | La Pointe Band Half-breeds | John Btse. Cadotte | Jean-Baptise Cadotte | Warrior |
| 54 | La Pointe Band Half-breeds | | Lemo Sayer | 2d chief |
| 55 | La Pointe Band Half-breeds | Jhn. Btse. Roy | Jean-Baptise Roy | Warrior |
| 56 | La Pointe Band Half-breeds | Michel Bas-he-na | | |
| 57 | La Pointe Band Half-breeds | Lueson Godin | Luizon Godin | |
| 58 | La Pointe Band Half-breeds | | John Sayer | |
| 59 | La Pointe Band Half-breeds | | Lueson Corbin | Chief |
| 60 | La Pointe, Wisconsin | Wm. W. Warren | William W. Warren | witness/interpreter |
| 61 | La Pointe, Wisconsin | Chas. H. Oakes | Charles H. Oakes | witness |
| 62 | Rochester, New York | | Roswell Hart | witness |
| 63 | Batavia, New York | | Henry Evans | witness |
| 64 | | A. Morrison | Allan Morrison | witness |
| 65 | | S. Hovers | Smith Hovers | witness |
| 66 | | | Mamoci M. Samuel | witness |
| 67 | | | Henry Blatchford | witness/interpreter |
| 68 | | | William A. Aitken | witness |
| 69 | | | Julius Ombrian | witness |

The signatory headmen were the following:

| # | Location | Recorded Name | Name (Translation/"Alias") | Title |
|---|---|---|---|---|
| 01 | Trout Lake | Ke-nesh-te-no | Ginishtinoo (Cree) | chief |
| 02 | Lac du Flambeau Band | Mah-shah | Maazhaa (Perhaps) | 1st warrior |
| 03 | Red Cedar Lake | I-oush-ou-c-ke-shik (Note: "I-oush-ou-c-ke-shik" should be "I-aush-au-e-ke-shik") | Ayaazhawi-giizhig (Crossing Sky) | chief |
| 04 | Mille Lacs Indians | Mah-ko-dah | Makode' (Bear's Heart) | 1st warrior |
| 05 | Mille Lacs Indians | Pe-tud | Pítad (Note: Name given in Dakota language) (Muskrat's Liver) | 1st chief |
| 06 | Mille Lacs Indians | Aunch-e-be-nas | Aanji-bines (Changing Bird) | 2d warrior |
| 07 | Red Cedar Lake | Mish-in-nack-in-ugo | Mishiinimakinaakoo (Mackinacker) | warrior |
| 08 | Sandy Lake Band | Gah-nin-dum-a-win-so (Note: "Gah-nin-dum-a-win-so" should be "Gah-nin-duw-a-win-so") | Gaa-nandawaawinzo (He that Gathers Berries/"le Brocheux") | 1st chief |
| 09 | Sandy Lake Band | Mis-quod-ase | Miskwaadesi (Painted Turtle) | warrior |
| 10 | Sandy Lake Band | Na-tum-e-gaw-bow | Netamigaabaw (Stands First) | 2d chief |
| 11 | Sandy Lake Band | I-ah-be-dua-we-dung | Ayaabidwewidang (Constantly Speak) | warrior |
| 12 | Pokegama | Bi-a-jig | Bayezhig (Lone Man) | 1st chief |
| 13 | Mississippi Half-breeds | | Joseph Montre | 1st chief |
| 14 | | Wm. W. Warren | William W. Warren | witness/interpreter |
| 15 | | | Peter Marksman | witness/interpreter |
| 16 | | | Smith Hovers | witness |

Treaty adhesion:

| # | Location | Recorded Name | Name (Translation/"Alias") | Title |
|---|---|---|---|---|
| 01 | Snake River | No-din | Noodin (Wind) | chief |
| 02 | | William A. Aitkin | William A. Aitken | witness |
| 03 | | R. B. Carlton | Reubin B. Carlton | witness |

Treaty adhesion approval:

| # | Location | Recorded Name | Name (Translation/"Alias") | Title |
|---|---|---|---|---|
| 01 | | Po-go-ne-gi-shik | Bagonegiizhig (Hole in the Day) | |
| 02 | | William Aitkin | William A. Aitken | witness |
| 03 | | D. T. Sloan | | witness |
