= Gaslyn, Wisconsin =

- Unincorporated community
- Location within Wisconsin Location within the United States
- Coordinates: 45°53′31″N 92°07′11″W
- Country: United States
- State: Wisconsin
- County: Burnett
- Town: Rusk
- Elevation: 989 ft (301 m)
- Time zone: UTC-6 (Central (CST))
  - Summer (DST): UTC-5 (CDT)
- Area codes: 715 & 534

Gaslyn is an unincorporated community in the town of Rusk, Burnett County, Wisconsin, United States. Gaslyn is located along County Highway H to the south of Gaslyn Lake. The community is part of the reservation of the St. Croix Chippewa Indians of Wisconsin. The community was named for David C. Gaslin, a logger during the 1860s. A post office operated in the community from 1902 to 1919.
