= Ruth A. Myers =

Ruth Myers

Ruth A. Myers (January 14, 1926 – November 23, 2001) was known as the “grandmother of American Indian Education in Minnesota.” A persistent voice for American Indian children and their families, Myers focused on education policy. She focused on learning opportunities for American Indian children. She also worked for curriculum and resource materials that reflected the American Indian history and culture for all Minnesota learners.

Myers was a member of the Grand Portage Band of Lake Superior Chippewa. She was not a professional educator. Her interest in education came first as a concerned mother of four children.

As a child she was sent to an Indian boarding school. This fact shaped her life. She spoke little of her experiences there but harnessed the pain to inspire positive change. She left Duluth in the 11th grade to go to work in a military airplane factory in Oklahoma.

Always an active member of her tribal community, Myers was urged to run for the Duluth School Board in 1971. She was elected, becoming the first non-White elected to public office in Duluth.

Four years later, Myers wanted to take her advocacy to a statewide level. She asked Governor Rudy Perpich to be appointed to the Minnesota State Board of Education (SBE). Myers was its first American Indian member. From that position she was appointed to numerous other posts, including a term on the Education Commission of the States.

Myers had great impact on the direction of the SBE. She twice served as its chair. She encouraged review of how American Indians were presented in textbooks, library materials, and the core curriculum. She fought for preservation of American Indian languages in the schools. Myers also insisted that every Minnesota student know something about Indian culture.

Myers looked at proposed rules from the perspective of their effect on American Indian families. For example, she charged that educators ignored specific nutritional needs and dietary restrictions, such as sensitivity to dairy products among native youth.

She also reminded policy-makers of the American Indian origins of the University of Minnesota Morris (UM-Morris) campus. With this history in mind, she advocated for native students to be able to attend UM-Morris without paying tuition.

In the early 1990s Myers joined the staff of the University of Minnesota Duluth (UMD) Medical School. She had been at UMD since 1973, as part of the Education Department. While there she started sixteen of seventeen UMD programs for American Indian students.

As Co-director of the Center of American Indian and Minority Health at the UMD School of Medicine, she recruited students and gave them academic coaching. She also helped them with life's details. For example, she regularly bought food for the UMD medical students who might not have time to shop or be able to afford it.

When Myers retired from UMD in 1994, the university honored her by establishing the Ruth A. Myers Endowed Chair of American Indian Studies.

Her interest in education showed in other ways as well. In 1986 Myers chaired the Fond du Lac Tribal and Community College (FLTCC) task force. The task force helped establish the permanent campus of Fond du Lac Community College in Cloquet. The FLTCC library is named the Ruth A. Myers Library in her honor. The Library contains a wealth of American Indian materials including the Anishinaabe and Minnesota regional collections. It also holds a juvenile/young adult collection of American Indian materials.

During her lifetime Myers represented the interests of American Indians in many ways. She was on as many as seventy boards and commissions. She was named the Elder of the Year by the Minnesota Indian Education Association. Other awards included the Marvelous Minnesota Woman Award, the Marge Wilkins Award, the UMD Chancellor's Distinguished Civil Service Award, an Honorary Doctorate in Humane Letters from UMD, and University of Minnesota President Hasselmo's Diversity Award.

Ruth A. Myers died in 2001 at the age of 75.
