= Sandy Lake Band of Mississippi Chippewa =

Historical Ojibwa tribe located in the upper Mississippi River basin

Sandy Lake Band of Mississippi Chippewa (Ojibwe: Gaa-mitaawangaagamaag-ininiwag) are a historical Ojibwa tribe located in the upper Mississippi River basin, on and around Big Sandy Lake in what today is in Aitkin County, Minnesota. Though politically folded into the Mille Lacs Band of Ojibwe, thus no longer independently federally recognized, for decades, Sandy Lake Band members have been leading efforts to restore their independent Federal recognition.

== History ==
=== Pre-treaty/early treaty times ===
Since the earliest of days, Gaa-mitaawangaagamaag, as the Sandy Lake is known in Anishinaabemowin or the Chippewa language, acted as a commercial hub in both east-west trade (via Savanna Portage) and north-south trade (via the Mississippi River). Originally, the area occupied by the Sandy Lake Band was inhabited by the Gros Ventres (Atsina) Tribe. Approximately 1,600 years ago, the Nakota Sioux advancing northward displaced the Gros Ventres westward. With the arrival of the Chippewa approximately 800 years ago, conflicts between the Assiniboine and the Chippewa pursued. By the time the French fur traders made contact in the Sandy Lake region, the Sandy Lake Band had near full control of the area's trade routes. By the time of the arrival of the European settlers around Sandy Lake, the Sandy Lake Band of Mississippi Chippewa became the instrumental tribe controlling the Savanna Portage trade-route that connected the Lake Superior and east with the Mississippi River and west. Sandy Lake Band became a treaty signatory to the 1787 British Treaty of Peace with the Dakota, Chippewa and Winnebago. Then starting with the 1825 First Treaty of Prairie du Chien, Sandy Lake Band became treaty signatory to it and other successive treaties with the United States.

=== Sandy Lake Tragedy ===
Due to last-minute changes in the annual annuity payments from a central region around La Pointe, Wisconsin, to not so central but as well known location of Sandy Lake in the fall of 1850, representatives from 19 Chippewa bands packed up and started an arduous journey to the shores of Sandy Lake, where they had been told to gather in late October for annual annuity payments and supplies. As it turned out, the annuity payments and supplies were late in coming to Sandy Lake, and the people had to wait until early December before they received the limited sums of money and available supplies. Trying to survive on spoiled and inadequate government rations while waiting for the annuities, about 150 Chippewa people died from dysentery and measles at Sandy Lake. Another 230-250 died en route home.

As a result of this tragedy, the Mississippi Chippewa Bands agreed to the establishment of Chippewa Reservations. Sandy Lake Indian Reservation was established in 1855, together with other Mississippi Chippewa Reservations of Lake Pokegama, Rabbit Lake, Gull Lake and Mille Lacs Lake. The same treaty established the Rice Lake Reservation, but due to the Bureau of Land Management claims of the Rice Lake Reservation being within the boundaries of the Sandy Lake Reservation, the Rice Lake Reservation was never formally platted.

=== Dakota War of 1862 ===
The Sandy Lake Band remained neutral during the Dakota War of 1862 against the United States. Due to this neutrality, the Sandy Lake Band were not forced to relocated to what eventually became the White Earth Reservation in Northwestern Minnesota, though the Band members were socially pressured to relocate and many did. Those who did relocate became the Removable Sandy Lake Band while those who remained became the Non-removable Sandy Lake Band. The Removable Sandy Lake Band members first relocated to Pokegama Lake Indian Reservation near Grand Rapids, Minnesota. Though friction developed between the Pillager Bands of Chippewa and the Mississippi Bands of Chippewa when most of the Mississippi Chippewa reservations were dissolved with all residences relocated to the area surrounding the original Leech Lake Indian Reservation, while all other removable Mississippi Chippewa Bands negotiated relocation to a less hostile area to form the White Earth Indian Reservation, the Pokegama Lake Band and some of the Removable Sandy Lake Band negotiated to remain in the area, forming the White Oak Point Band on the White Oak Point Indian Reservation in 1873, which in 1934 merged with the Leech Lake and other bands of the 5 contiguous Indian Reservations in the area to form the contemporary Leech Lake Band of Ojibwe and the "Greater" Leech Lake Indian Reservation.

=== Loss of independent recognition ===
When plans were being negotiated by the United States in 1887 to consolidate all the Ojibwe bands scattered about Minnesota, including the Sandy Lake Band, to the White Earth Indian Reservation, the commission for these plans, after an unsuccessful meeting with the Mille Lacs Indians and on their way to meet with the Fond du Lac Band, stopped to meet with the Sandy Lake Band, but again without success in negotiations, as they learned later the Sandy Lake Band had purposely avoided the meeting. In 1889 with the passage of the Indian Allotment Act to officially relocate all scattered Ojibwe bands in Minnesota to the White Earth Indian Reservation, the Treaty-established Sandy Lake Reservation of approximately 27 mi² (70 km²) was erased from the maps, forcing the Non-removable Sandy Lake Band to be a federally recognized tribe without a reservation. On 4 March 1915, President Woodrow Wilson issued an Executive Order to set aside a 32.35-acre (13.09 ha) tract of land within the Sandy Lake Indian Reservation for the Fond du Lac Band along the banks of the Sandy Lake. In addition, on August 24, 1940, Sandy Lake community managed to secure 147 acres (59.5 ha) parcel of land adjacent to the northeast corner of the original reservation for the benefit of the Sandy Lake Band, and other small tracts of land within the original Sandy Lake Reservation area. However, in 1980, the Bureau of Indian Affairs issued a Solicitor's Opinion that the Executive Order re-established a reservation at Sandy Lake and that the Mille Lacs Band of Ojibwe is empowered to exercise control over the reservation.

The Non-removable Sandy Lake Band of Mississippi Chippewa lost their independent federal recognition under the Indian Reorganization Act of 1934 when the Bureau of Indian Affairs approved the constitution of the Minnesota Chippewa Tribe, which grouped all the scattered bands in the Mille Lacs region to form the Mille Lacs Band of Ojibwe, and then placing their lands under the auspices of the Mille Lacs Band of Ojibwe, as Mille Lacs Reservation District II. Mille Lacs Band of Ojibwe, according to the Bureau of Indian Affairs-approved constitution, thence comprised the Non-removable and Removable Mille Lacs Indians of the Mille Lacs Lake Reservation, Non-removable Sandy Lake Band of Mississippi Chippewa of the Sandy Lake Reservation, Rice Lake Band of Mississippi Chippewa, and the Snake River and Kettle River Chippewa Communities of the St. Croix Chippewa Indians. During the early years of the Minnesota Chippewa Tribe, each of the historical Bands that formed the Mille Lacs Band of Ojibwe had a representative on the new amalgamated Band's tribal council known as the Reservation Business Committee (RBC). However, after the a significant revision to the RBC structure, allowing for only one elected representative from each RBC district, Sandy Lake Band was faced with losing full representation. In protest, many Sandy Lake Tribal members dis-enrolled from the Mille Lacs Band and formally began the process of regaining independent Federal recognition. Sandy Lake Tribal members continued to reside on the original Sandy Lake Indian Reservation lands and many did not receive any tribal services or housing because the many Sandy Lake tribal members were not enrolled in the Mille Lacs Band.

When the Mille Lacs Band of Ojibwe became a Gaming Compact Tribe in 1988, a large rush of eligible enrollees attempted to enroll with the Mille Lacs Band. Some Sandy Lake Band members who dis-enrolled and never re-enrolled elsewhere were eligible to re-enroll with the Mille Lacs Band. Sandy Lake Band members who dis-enrolled from the Mille Lacs Band and re-enrolled elsewhere were automatically excluded from dis-enrolling from their new tribe to re-enroll with the Mille Lacs Band. Meanwhile, the Sandy Lake Band members who dis-enrolled from the Mille Lacs Band without re-enrolling elsewhere continued to struggle with their effort to re-gain their independent Federal recognition.

=== Sandy Lake Band today ===
Each of the component historical Bands and communities forming the Mille Lacs Band of Ojibwe still form very distinct tribal entities from each other, each with separate tribal histories—Sandy Lake Band is no exception. Today, the Sandy Lake Band community is primarily located along the north-shore of Sandy Lake while the Mille Lacs Band's Sandy Lake community is primarily located along the south-shore of Sandy Lake near Lake Minnewawa.

For nearly thirty years, many Sandy Lake Band members continue to lead efforts to restore their independent federal recognition while others fully participate in the Mille Lacs Band tribal government process. Independent federal recognition status is often resisted by the Minnesota Chippewa Tribe members who urge the Sandy Lake Band to first hold regular government sessions with minutes recording their proceedings, such that the Sandy Lake Band may provide documented evidence of regular and consistent government sessions. Sandy Lake Band, in conjunction with their efforts to restore independent federal recognition, have pursued both county and state recognition. The Sandy Lake Band was recognized by Aitkin County, Minnesota in 1992 and affirmed of the recognition in 1996. For the State recognition process, bills have been sent to the Minnesota legislatures in 1997, 1999 and 2000, failing each time by a narrow margin of votes.
