= Rusk, Burnett County, Wisconsin =

Rusk, Wisconsin
- Town
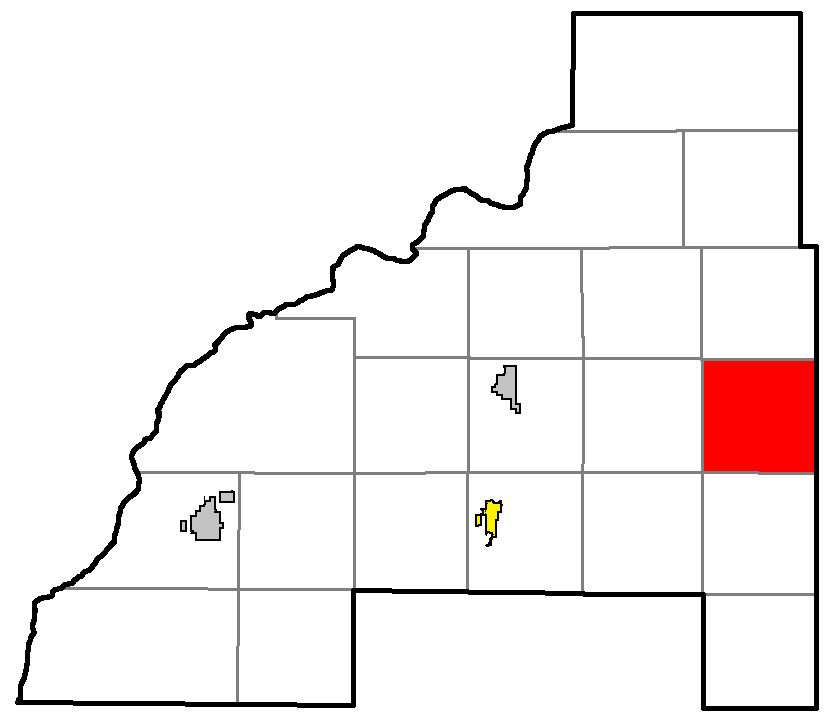
- Location of Rusk, within Burnett County
- Coordinates: 45°52′19″N 92°5′25″W
- Country: United States
- State: Wisconsin
- County: Burnett

Area
  - Total: 34.7 sq mi (89.9 km^{2})
  - Land: 32.6 sq mi (84.5 km^{2})
  - Water: 2.1 sq mi (5.4 km^{2})
- Elevation: 974 ft (297 m)

Population (2020)
  - Total: 470
  - Density: 14/sq mi (5.6/km^{2})
- Time zone: UTC-6 (Central (CST))
  - Summer (DST): UTC-5 (CDT)
- Area codes: 715 & 534
- FIPS code: 55-70225
- GNIS feature ID: 1584078
- Website: https://rusktownship.com/

Rusk is a town located in Burnett County in the U.S. state of Wisconsin. As of the 2020 census, the town had a population of 470. The unincorporated community of Gaslyn is located in the town.

== Geography ==
Rusk is located in eastern Burnett County, with Washburn County along the town's eastern border. According to the United States Census Bureau, the town has a total area of 34.7 square miles (89.9 km^{2}), of which 32.6 square miles (84.5 km^{2}) is land and 2.1 square miles (5.4 km^{2}), or 6.03%, is water. The Yellow River, a tributary of the St. Croix River, flows from east to west across the town. Major lakes in town include Rice Lake, Benoit Lake, and Lipsett Lake.

== Demographics ==
As of the census of 2000, there were 420 people, 162 households, and 123 families residing in the town. The population density was 12.9 people per square mile (5.0/km^{2}). There were 338 housing units at an average density of 10.4 per square mile (4.0/km^{2}). The racial makeup of the town was 96.90% White, 2.38% Native American, 0.48% Pacific Islander, and 0.24% from two or more races.

There were 162 households, out of which 24.1% had children under the age of 18 living with them, 64.8% were married couples living together, 5.6% had a female householder with no husband present, and 23.5% were non-families. 18.5% of all households were made up of individuals, and 6.8% had someone living alone who was 65 years of age or older. The average household size was 2.49 and the average family size was 2.80.

In the town, the population was spread out, with 21.9% under the age of 18, 5.7% from 18 to 24, 23.6% from 25 to 44, 32.9% from 45 to 64, and 16.0% who were 65 years of age or older. The median age was 44 years. For every 100 females, there were 100.0 males. For every 100 females age 18 and over, there were 103.7 males.

The median income for a household in the town was $33,750, and the median income for a family was $40,341. Males had a median income of $27,500 versus $24,688 for females. The per capita income for the town was $15,368. About 7.3% of families and 8.3% of the population were below the poverty line, including 3.2% of those under the age of 18 and 5.9% of those 65 and older.
