= Peter Marksman =

Native American Methodist minister and Ojibwe leader (c. 1817–1892)

Peter Marksman (Ojibwe: Ma-dwa-gwun-a-yaush; c. 1817 – 1892) was a Native American Methodist minister, active in Michigan among the Potawatomi Indians. He was member of the L'Anse Band of Lake Superior Chippewa. His Indian name was Ma-dwa-gwun-a-yaush, from the Ojibwe Madwegwaneyaash, meaning "[Arrow]-Feathers Are Heard in the Breeze," which is an indicator of an expert archer/marksman. Consequently, when he converted to Christianity, he chose "Marksman" as his surname. As a chief, he was a signatory to the 1847 Treaty of Fond du Lac and the 1854 Treaty of La Pointe. His wife's name was "Hannah", to which the Hannahville Indian Community chose to be named after her in honor of both Marksman and his wife. He died March 28, 1892, aged about 75 years.
