= Lake Superior Chippewa =

Group of indigenous peoples in North America

The Lake Superior Chippewa (Anishinaabemowin: Gichigamiwininiwag, lit. "Lake Superior Men") are a large number of Ojibwe (Anishinaabe) bands living around Lake Superior; this territory is considered part of northern Michigan, Wisconsin, and Minnesota in the United States. They migrated into the area by the seventeenth century, encroaching on the Eastern Dakota people who had historically occupied the area. The Ojibwe defeated the Eastern Dakota, who migrated west into the Great Plains after the final battle in 1745. While they share a common culture including the Anishinaabe language, this highly decentralized group of Ojibwe includes at least twelve independent bands in the region.

As the Lake Superior Chippewa in the nineteenth century, leaders of the bands negotiated together with the United States government under a variety of treaties to protect their historic territories against land theft by European-American settlers. The United States set up several reservations for bands in this area under the treaties, culminating in one in 1854. This enabled the people to stay in this territory rather than to be forced west of the Mississippi River, as the government had attempted. Under the treaty, bands with reservations have been federally recognized as independent tribes; several retain Lake Superior Chippewa in their formal names to indicate their shared culture.

== Origins ==
At some point before 1650, the Ojibwe split into two groups near what is now Sault Ste. Marie, Michigan. They believed this to have been one of the stops in their migration that their prophets predicted; it was part of the westward path of the Anishinaabe from the Atlantic Coast.

Ojibwe who followed the south shore of Lake Superior found the final prophesied stopping place and "the food that grows on water" (wild rice) at Madeline Island. During the late 17th century, the Ojibwe at Madeline Island began to expand into other territory. They had population pressures, a desire for furs to trade, and divisions over relations with French Jesuit missions. For a time they had an alliance with the Eastern Dakota.

Beginning about 1737, they competed for nearly 100 years with the Eastern Dakota and the Meskwaki tribes in the interior of Wisconsin, west and south of Lake Superior. The Ojibwe were technologically more advanced, and acquired guns through trade with the French, which for a time gave them an advantage. They eventually drove the Dakota Sioux out of most of northern Wisconsin and northeastern Minnesota into the western plains.

The Lakota were pushed west, where they eventually settled in the Great Plains of present-day Nebraska and the Dakotas. The Ojibwe successfully spread throughout the Great Lakes region, with colonizing bands settling along lakes and rivers throughout what would become northern Michigan, Wisconsin and Minnesota. La Pointe on Madeline Island remained the spiritual and commercial center of the nation, and is listed on the National Register of Historic Places.

== Sub-nations ==
The Lake Superior Chippewa are numerous and contain many bands.

A separate sub-nation, known as the Biitan-akiing-enabijig (Border Sitters), were located between the Ojibwe of the Lake Superior watershed and other nations. The Biitan-akiing-enabijig were divided into three principal Bands:

- Manoominikeshiinyag (the "Ricing Rails" or St. Croix Chippewa Indians, in the St. Croix River valley);
- Odaawaa-zaaga'iganiwininiwag (the "Ottawa Lake Men", around Lac Courte Oreilles); and
- Waaswaaganiwininiwag (the "Torch Men", around Lac du Flambeau). Numerous sub-bands also existed.

== Treaties and reservations ==
In a series of treaties with the US Government in the mid-nineteenth century, the Lake Superior Chippewa were formally grouped as a unit, which included the

- Mississippi,
- Pillager,
- Bois Forte,
- Muskrat Portage,
- Red Lake
- Pembina and
- La Pointe bands. These villages had been politically independent and did not have a centralized tribal authority.

In the winter of 1851, President Zachary Taylor ordered the removal of the Lake Superior Chippewa to west of the Mississippi River, as had already been forced on most other tribes in the east. During the course of these removals, the US Army attacked in what has become known as the Sandy Lake tragedy, in which several hundred Chippewa died, including women and children. The La Pointe chief Kechewaishke (Buffalo) went to Washington, DC to appeal to the government for relief. National outrage had been aroused by the many deaths of the Ojibwe, and the US ended attempts at Ojibwe removal.

The final treaty in 1854 established permanent reservations in Michigan at L'Anse, Lac Vieux Desert, and Ontonagon. In 1934 under the Indian Reorganization Act, the Keweenaw Bay Indian Community was defined as successor apparent to the L'Anse, Lac Vieux Desert, and Ontonagon bands. Government functions were centralized with it, although all three reservations were retained. In 1988 the Lac Vieux Desert Band of Lake Superior Chippewa succeeded in gaining federal recognition as a separate tribe. Together with the Keneewaw Bay tribe, it is part of the Inter-Tribal Council of Michigan, which represents 11 of the 12 federally recognized tribes in Michigan. These include tribes of Potowatomi and Odawa peoples who, together with the Ojibwe, have made up the Council of Three Fires.

In Wisconsin, reservations were established at Red Cliff, Bad River, Lac Courte Oreilles, and Lac du Flambeau. The St. Croix and Sokaogon bands, left out of the 1854 treaty, did not obtain tribal lands or federal recognition until the 1930s after the Indian Reorganization Act.

In Minnesota, reservations were set up at Fond du Lac and Grand Portage. Other bands, such as the Bois Forte Band, continued independent negotiations with the US government and ended political affiliation with the Lake Superior Chippewa.

== Today ==
Today the bands are federally recognized as independent tribes with their own governments. They remain culturally closely connected. They have engaged in legal actions concerning treaty rights, such as fishing for walleye. Many bands include "Lake Superior Chippewa" in their official tribal names to indicate their historic and cultural affiliations (Red Cliff Band of Lake Superior Chippewa, Fond du Lac Band of Lake Superior Chippewa, etc.)

Historical bands and political successors-apparent are the following:

- Keweenaw Bay Indian Community, merged from
  - L'Anse Band of Lake Superior Chippewa (historical)
  - Ontonagon Band of Lake Superior Chippewa (historical)
- Lac Vieux Desert Band of Chippewa
- La Pointe Band of Lake Superior Chippewa (historical): descendants are
  - Red Cliff Band of Lake Superior Chippewa
  - Bad River Band of the Lake Superior Tribe of Chippewa Indians
- Lac Courte Oreilles Band of Lake Superior Chippewa Indians
- Lac du Flambeau Band of Lake Superior Chippewa
- St. Croix Band of Lake Superior Chippewa (historical): descendants are
  - Mille Lacs Band of Ojibwe, merged from
    - Mille Lacs Indians (historical)
    - Rice Lake Band of Mississippi Chippewa (historical)
    - Sandy Lake Band of Mississippi Chippewa (historical)
    - Snake and Kettle River Bands of St. Croix Chippewa Indians of Minnesota (historical)
  - St. Croix Chippewa Indians of Wisconsin
- Sokaogon Chippewa Community
- Fond du Lac Band of Lake Superior Chippewa
- Grand Portage Band
- Bois Forte Band of Chippewa, merged from
  - Lake Vermilion Band of Lake Superior Chippewa (historical)
  - Little Forks Band of Rainy River Saulteaux (historical)
  - Nett Lake Band of Rainy River Saulteaux (historical)

In addition to these political successors-apparent, the Mille Lacs Band of Ojibwe (via the St. Croix Chippewa Indians of Minnesota), Leech Lake Band of Ojibwe (via Removable Fond du Lac Band of the Chippewa Indian Reservation), and the White Earth Band of Chippewa (via the Removable St. Croix Chippewa of Wisconsin of the Gull Lake Indian Reservation) in present-day Minnesota retain minor Successorship to the Lake Superior Chippewa. They do not exercise the aboriginal sovereign powers derived from the Lake Superior Chippewa.

== See also ==
- Findians
