= Ryan Village, Minnesota =

Unincorporated community in Minnesota, US

Ryan Village
- Unincorporated community
- Location within Minnesota Location within the United States
- Coordinates: 47°21′32″N 94°17′21″W
- Country: United States
- State: Minnesota
- County: Cass
- Elevation: 1,319 ft (402 m)
- Time zone: UTC-6 (Central (CST))
  - Summer (DST): UTC-5 (CDT)
- ZIP code: 56626
- Area code: 218
- GNIS feature ID: 658123

Ryan Village is an unincorporated community in Cass County, Minnesota, United States, within the Bowstring State Forest and the Chippewa National Forest. It is located between Cass Lake and Bena along U.S. Highway 2. The village is within the Leech Lake Indian Reservation.
