= George L. Waite =

American photographer

George L. Waite (1869 - April 16, 1945 age 76) was a photographer. He worked for the Milwaukee Journal. Editor & Publisher described him as a pioneer in color photography.

He took botanical photographs. He photographed orchids.

He was the photographer for an expedition to Algeria.

He lived in Wauwatosa, Wisconsin. He took photographs at the Lac du Flambeau Reservation. His photographs in the reservation include images of canoe making.

He photographed orchids on excursions with Albert Fuller, curator of the Milwaukee Public Museum. In 1931 he gave a presentation with colored slide photographs of "Wisconsin Native Orchids".

He worked with Carol McMillan Reid on the book Toys at Play with photographs.
