= St. Croix Chippewa Indians of Wisconsin =

Bikoganoogan

Total population
- 1,054 (2010)

Regions with significant populations
- United States (Wisconsin)

Languages
- English, Ojibwe

Related ethnic groups
- Other Ojibwe people

The St. Croix Chippewa Indians of Wisconsin (or the St. Croix Band for short; Ojibwe: Bikoganoogan) are a federally recognized tribe of Ojibwe people located in Northwest Wisconsin, along the St. Croix River valley and watershed. The band had 1,054 members as of 2010.

== History ==
St. Croix Chippewa Indians of Wisconsin is the eastern half of the historic St. Croix Chippewa Indians who lost federal recognition in 1854. St. Croix Chippewa Indians of Wisconsin re-gained their federal recognition under the Indian Reorganization Act. The western half of the historical tribe, the St. Croix Chippewa Indians of Minnesota, are non-Federally recognized component of the Mille Lacs Band of Ojibwe. Due to loss of Federal recognition in 1854, as one of two successors apparent of the historical St. Croix Chippewa Indians, the St. Croix Chippewa Indians of Wisconsin do not have a contiguous Indian Reservation.

== Government ==
The St. Croix Chippewa Indians of Wisconsin is a federally recognized tribe governed by a five-member council elected for two-year terms. The tribal council is responsible for the general welfare of tribal members and the management of day-to-day tribal business. The council is governed by the tribal constitution and by-laws, which were originally ratified in 1934 under the Indian Reorganization Act.

The tribal headquarters is located on the Sand Lake Reservation Community, which is one mile (1.6 km) west of the unincorporated community of Hertel, Wisconsin.

== Economic enterprises ==
The Tribe operates the St. Croix Casino enterprise of three casinos: St. Croix Casino Turtle Lake, formally known as St. Croix Casino & Hotel in Turtle Lake, Wisconsin; St. Croix Casino Hertel, formally known as "Little Turtle" Hertel Express Casino in Hertel; and St. Croix Casino Danbury, formally known as St. Croix Casino and Hotel Danbury in Danbury. As of 2010, the St. Croix Band was the largest employer in Burnett County.

== Reservation ==
The St. Croix Indian Reservation is not a contiguous Indian reservation in the typical sense, but instead consists of small disconnected tracts of land placed into federal reservation or off-reservation trust land status. The tracts represent communities made up of families who have frequently lived in the same vicinity for generations. The reservation communities are scattered, with about 50 miles (80 km) being the longest distance between any two of them. The five major communities are Sand Lake, Danbury, Round Lake, Maple Plain, and Gaslyn. They occupy land in Barron, Burnett, and Polk counties.

According to the U.S. Census Bureau, the band's combined reservation and off-reservation trust land have a total area of 3.81 square miles (9.86 km^{2}), of which 3.71 square miles (9.6 km^{2}) is land and 0.1 square miles (0.26 km^{2}) is water. The combined population of St. Croix Reservation and Off-Reservation Trust Land was 765 at the 2020 census, including 442 in Burnett County, 185 in Polk County, and 138 in Barron County.
