= Shingabawossin =

Chief Shingabawossin
- Zhingaabewasin
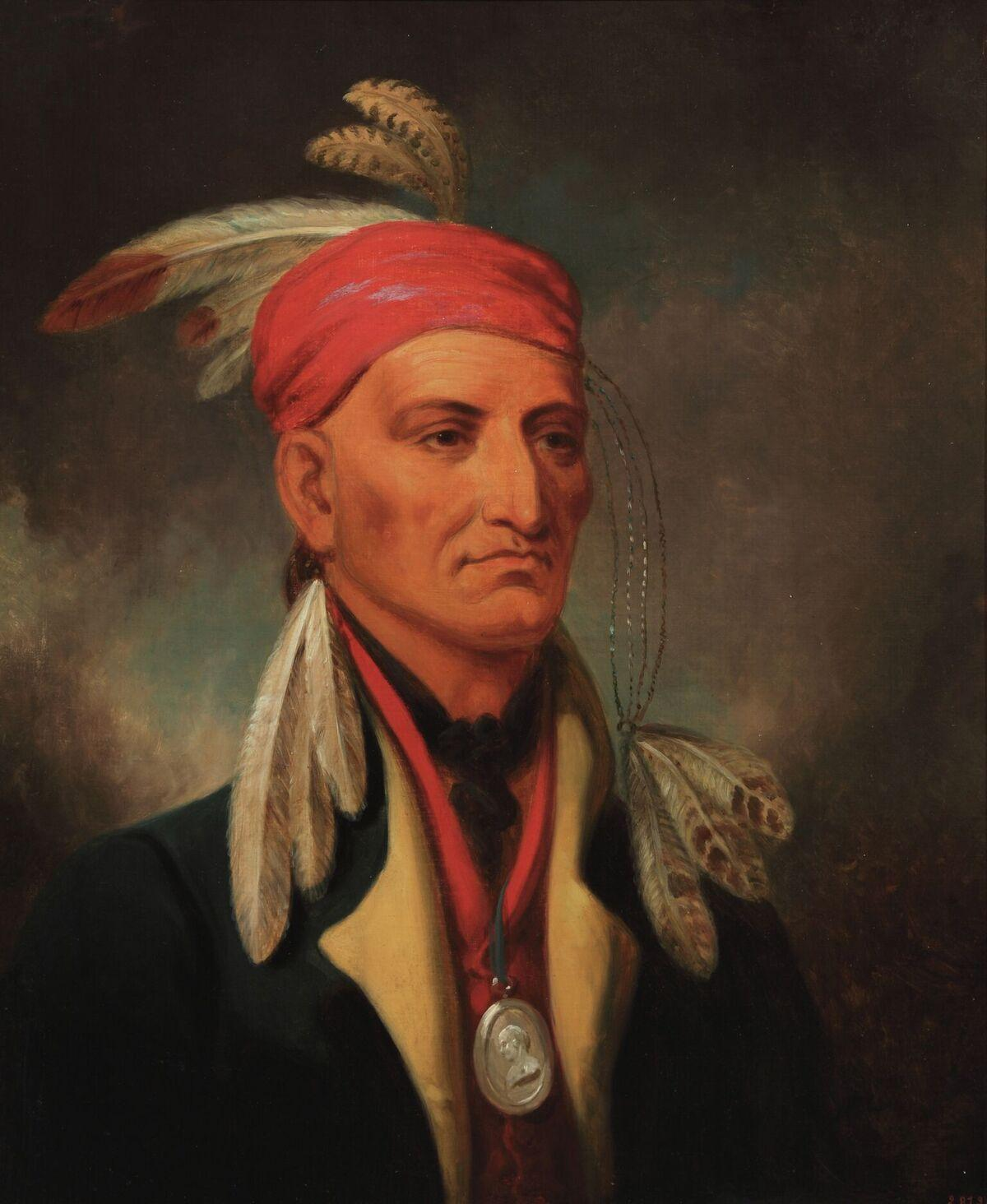
- Shingabawossin in early 1800s by Tim Stone, White Earth Indian Reservation (Based on lithograph by Charles Bird King in McKenney and Hall's History of the Indian Tribes of North America)
- Born: c. 1763; Sault Ste. Marie, Canada/United States
- Died: c. 1830; Sault Ste. Marie, Michigan, United States
- Occupations: Ogimaa (Chief); Ogichidaa (Warrior); Zhimaagan (Soldier)

Chief Shingabawossin (recorded variously as Shin-ga-ba W'Ossin, Shin-ga-ba-wossin, Shin-ga-ba-wassin and Shingabowossin, from the Ojibwe: zhingaabewasin "image stone") (c. 1763–c. 1830) was an Ojibwa chief about Sault Ste. Marie. Chief Shingabawossin was of the Crane doodem.

Chief Shingabawossin was born about 1763. He was the grandson of Gi-chi-o-jee-de-bun and the oldest of the nine son of Naid-o-sa-gee's family, consisting of about 20 children in all from four wives. Chief Shingabawossin had one wife and twelve children. He participated in the 1783 Battle of St. Croix Falls, under the leadership of La Pointe Chief Waubojeeg. During the War of 1812, he was enlisted by the British to fight against the Americans and went to York to join Tecumseh's War.

He was prominent during the first quarter of the 19th century, thus taking part as a signatory to the 1820 Treaty of Sault Ste. Marie, the first treaty made with the United States in that area. In 1822, Henry Schoolcraft met with the Chief and established the US Indian Agency in Sault Ste. Marie. He was a signatory for the 1825 First Treaty of Prairie du Chien and the 1826 Treaty of Fond du Lac. Often, he was the leading speaker and usually the most important person among the Ojibwa delegates. He died sometime between 1828 and 1837, succeeded as Chief by his son Gabenoodin (Kabay Noden, "Constant Breeze").
