= Gaslyn Lake =

Body of water in Wisconsin, US

- Location within Wisconsin Location within the United States
- Location: Burnett County, Wisconsin
- Coordinates: 45.900°N 92.117°W
- Type: Drainage Lake
- Surface area: 161 acres (65 ha)
- Average depth: 6 feet (1.8 m)
- Max. depth: 12 feet (3.7 m)
- Water volume: 989.2 acre-feet (1,220,200 m^{3})
- Shore length^{1}: 989.2 miles (1,592.0 km)
- Settlements: Shell Lake
- ^{1} Shore length is not a well-defined measure.

Gaslyn Lake is a 161-acre (65 ha) lake located in Burnett County, Wisconsin. It has a maximum depth of 12 feet. Visitors have access to the lake from a public boat landing. Fish include panfish, largemouth bass and northern pike.
