= Leech Lake Indian Reservation =

Indian reservation located in north-central Minnesota

Coordinates: 47°21′19″N 94°15′25″W

The Leech Lake Reservation (Ojibwe: Gaa-zagaskwaajimekaag) is an Indian reservation located in the north-central Minnesota counties of Cass, Itasca, Beltrami, and Hubbard. The reservation forms the land base for the federally recognized Leech Lake Band of Ojibwe, one of six bands comprising the Minnesota Chippewa Tribe, organized in 1934. The Leech Lake Reservation has the second highest population of any reservation in Minnesota with White Earth Nation being the largest Minnesota Ojibwe tribe, Leech Lake Nation has a resident population of 11,388 indicated by the 2020 census.

Location of the Leech Lake Indian Reservation.

== History ==
The Leech Lake Reservation was not established in a single legislative act. Rather, it grew from the amalgamation of multiple treaties, executive orders, and various articles of legislation spanning many decades. The core areas of the reservation were established by the 1855 treaty of Washington, which formed three smaller reservations for the Pillager Band of Chippewa Indians at Leech Lake, Cass Lake, and Lake Winnibigoshish. These reservations were reshaped and consolidated by new treaties in 1864 and 1867, when the United States sought with little success to concentrate Ojibwes from other reservations together at a single location. The reservation was further modified by several executive orders in the 1870s, one of which created the White Oak Point reservation of the Mississippi Band.

Under the Dawes Act of 1887 and the Nelson Act of 1889, the United States allotted tribal land on the Ojibwe reservations into private parcels. Some parcels were held by individual tribal members, but much of the reservation was alienated into the ownership of timber companies and white settlers. In addition, the United States established what became the Chippewa National Forest in the early twentieth century on the remaining unallotted tribal land. As a result, by 1934, less than 5% of the reservation was still in Ojibwe ownership.

Following the Indian Reorganization Act of 1934, the present "Greater" Leech Lake Indian Reservation was formed from the administrative merger of the Leech Lake, Cass Lake, and Lake Winnibigoshish reservations of the Pillager Band, the Chippewa Indian Reservation of the Lake Superior Band, and the White Oak Point reservation of the Mississippi Band.

Between 1948 and 1959, the U.S. Department of Interior continued to transfer thousands of acres of tribally owned reservation allotments at Leech Lake to the U.S. Department of Agriculture for incorporation into Chippewa National Forest. The Department of Interior discontinued these transfers in 1959 after finding that it had acted illegally by selling allotments without the consent of tribal landowners. In 2020, Congress passed legislation to return approximately 11,760 acres of this illegally taken land from the Chippewa National Forest back to the Leech Lake Reservation. The returned parcels regained trust status as part of the reservation in 2024.

Even after the return of national forest land in 2024, the Leech Lake Band owns a smaller percentage of its reservation than any other Ojibwe nation in Minnesota. The returned land had constituted about 1.75% of the Chippewa National Forest, and about 40% of the national forest continues to occupy reservation land.

== Geography ==
According to the United States Census Bureau, the Leech Lake Reservation has a total area of 1,310.36 square miles (3,393.8 km^{2}), of which 973.37 square miles (2,521.0 km^{2}) is land and 336.99 square miles (872.8 km^{2}) is water. In addition, the Leech Lake Band held off-reservation trust land with a land area of 0.083 square miles (53 acres; 0.21 km^{2}) in 2020.

About one-fourth of the reservation is covered by lakes. The largest lakes on the reservation are Leech Lake, Lake Winnibigoshish, and Cass Lake. The band uses 40 lakes for the production of wild rice, and the community produces more rice than any other reservation in the state. The reservation is the second-largest in Minnesota (after the White Earth Indian Reservation) in terms of land area, and the largest in terms of total area.

== Communities ==
The reservation consists of eleven villages; two additional communities have a substantial number of Leech Lake Band members. Nearly all Leech Lake communities are located in or near the woods of the Chippewa National Forest. The largest community is Cass Lake, situated on the southwestern shores of the eponymous lake. The next largest settlements are Ball Club, Onigum, Inger, and Bena. In some communities, housing is located along only one road, with each side lined with homes.

- Ah-gwah-ching (part)
- Baker
- Ball Club
- Bena
- Benedict (part)
- Brevik
- Cass Lake
- Deer River (part)
- Dunbar
- Inger
- Longville (part)
- Max
- Mission
- Oak Point
- Onigum
- Oslund
- Pennington
- Ryan Village
- Smokey Point
- Squaw Lake
- Sugar Point
- Whipholt
- Wilkinson

== Demographics ==
As of the census of 2020, the population of the Leech Lake Reservation was 11,388. The population density was 11.7 inhabitants per square mile (4.5/km^{2}). There were 7,229 housing units at an average density of 7.4 per square mile (2.9/km^{2}).

The Leech Lake Reservation has a significant non-native population due in part to the allotment and sale of reservation lands in the late nineteenth century. In 2020, the racial makeup of the reservation was 49.3% White, 43.8% Native American, 0.1% Black or African American, 0.1% Asian, 0.4% from other races, and 6.3% from two or more races. Ethnically, the population was 1.7% Hispanic or Latino of any race.

== Education ==
There are two tribal schools, Bug-O-Nay-Ge-Shig School and Leech Lake Tribal College.

== See also ==
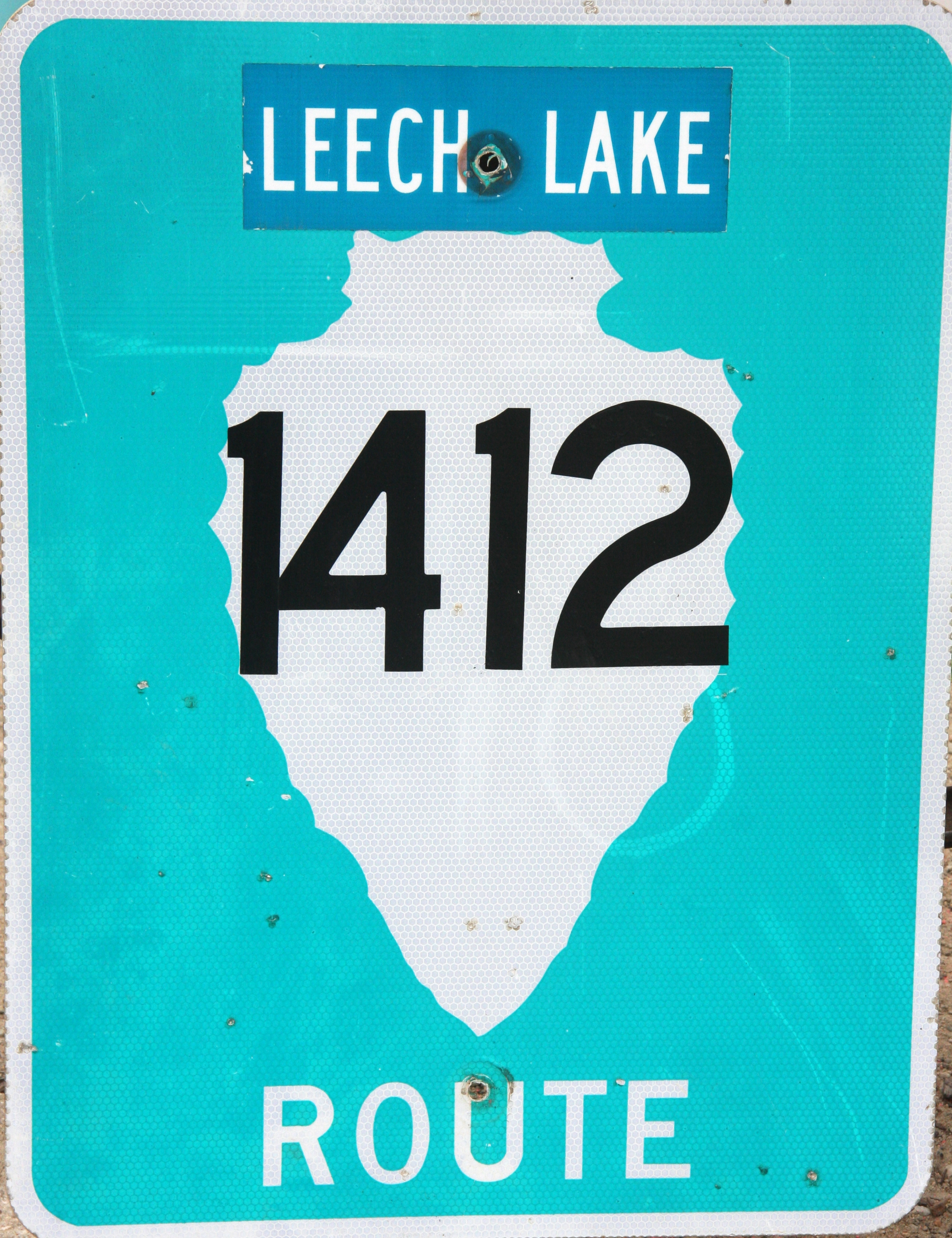
Leech Lake Indian Reservation highway route marker

- Battle of Sugar Point
- Bryan v. Itasca County
- Leech Lake Tribal College
- List of historical Indian reservations in the United States
- List of largest Indian reservations
- Minnesota Indian Affairs Council
