= St. Croix Chippewa Indians =

The St. Croix Chippewa Indians (Ojibwe language: Manoominikeshiinyag, the "Ricing Rails") are a historical Band of Ojibwe located along the St. Croix River, which forms the boundary between the U.S. states of Wisconsin and Minnesota. The majority of the St. Croix Band are divided into two groups: the federally recognized St. Croix Chippewa Indians of Wisconsin, and the St. Croix Chippewa Indians of Minnesota, who are one of four constituent members forming the federally recognized Mille Lacs Band of Ojibwe. The latter is one of six bands in the federally recognized Minnesota Chippewa Tribe.

== History ==
The Manoominikeshiinyag were one of the three major Bands forming the Biitan-akiing-enabijig (Border Sitters), named because of their proximity to the Eastern Dakota peoples. In turn, the Biitan-akiing-enabijig were a sub-Nation of the Gichigamiwininiwag (Lake Superior Men).

The St. Croix Band arrived in the area nearly 600 years ago; according to their oral tradition, they were directed to move southward from Lake Superior to "the place where there is food upon the waters." In colonizing the St. Croix River valley and its tributaries, the St. Croix Band entered into a fierce territorial dispute with the Sioux and the Meskwaki. Eight other Native American Tribes were also located in the St. Croix River Valley.

To this day in the Ojibwe language, the headwaters of the St. Croix River is called "Manoominikeshiinyag-ziibi" (Ricing Rail River), the St. Croix River below the confluence of the Namekegon River as "Gichi-ziibi" (Big River) and below the confluence of Trade River as "Jiibayaatigo-ziibi" (Grave-marker River). The name "St. Croix River" was based on the "Jiibayaatigo-ziibi" name of the river.

St. Croix Band was originally divided into the following sub-bands:

- Apple River Band
- Clam River Band
- Kettle River Band
- Knife River Band
- Rice River Band
- Rush River Band
- Snake River Band
- Sunrise River Band
- Tamarack River Band
- Totogatic River Band
- Wolf River Band
- Wood River Band
- Yellow River Band

Due to the inter-relationship and marriages with the Eastern Dakota peoples, the Knife, Rice, Rush, Snake, Sunrise and Apple River bands were considered equally Dakota as Ojibwe. Consequently, citizens from these Bands may have had Dakota names, many were of the Ma'iingan (Wolf) Doodem. There were also many chiefs with similar names such as Zhaagobe, chief of the Snake River band; Sha-có-pay, a chief of the Plains Ojibwe; and Shakopee, a chief of the Mdewakanton Dakota who lived on the Minnesota River.

=== Division ===
The St. Croix Band are signatories to the Treaty of St. Peters (1837), also known as the "White Pine Treaty," which ceded lands so that lumbermen could harvest the great number of White pine growing along the St. Croix River watershed. This treaty assured the signatory Tribes of the right to continue to enjoy traditional hunting, fishing and gathering practices in the territory. After the Sandy Lake Tragedy in the autumn and winter of 1850, the St. Croix Band and other Ojibwe bands, with public support and outcry throughout the United States, were spared from the Indian removal policy.

The St. Croix and other bands entered treaty negotiations with the US to establish a reservation for each of the Ojibwe bands. Confident that the Tribe could maintain exercising their hunting, fishing and gathering rights in the area ceded to the United States in 1837, the St. Croix Band did not agree to relocating to a reservation. In 1854, the St. Croix Band were omitted from the Treaty of La Pointe and lost their federal recognition. No longer with recognized status, the St. Croix Band was prohibited from exercising its hunting rights that had been protected under the Treaty of St. Peters.

The US government urged the St. Croix Band members of Wisconsin to relocate to the Lac Courte Oreilles Indian Reservation so that they could receive annuity payments. Although many did relocate, just as many remained in the St. Croix valley. When the Mille Lacs Indian Reservation was established in 1855, the remaining St. Croix Band members in Minnesota were urged to relocate there; again, some did, but others stayed outside the reservation.

With tensions rising between the lumbermen and the St. Croix Band, the US removed several St. Croix Band villages to the Gull Lake Reservation near Brainerd, Minnesota. The Rice River Band of the St. Croix Band was absorbed by the Rice Lake Band of Mississippi Chippewa.

=== Dispersal ===
Due to repeated broken promises by the United States, the Eastern Dakota peoples expressed their anger at the government. Failing to get an adequate response from their assigned Indian Agent, in 1862 the Mdewakanton and The Wahpekute declared war against the United States in what is now referred as the "Dakota War of 1862," which occurred during the American Civil War. Many Ojibwe bands, including the St. Croix Band members relocated onto the Gull Lake Reservation and the St. Croix Band members living with the Rice Lake Band members awaiting for the establishment of an Indian Reservation, joined the Dakota people to support their efforts. The Dakota were defeated by the United States, who punished them and their allies. They removed the hostile bands to the vicinity surrounding the Leech Lake Indian Reservation, then to a more distant location, now known as the White Earth Indian Reservation. (Both of these bands became members of the Minnesota Chippewa Tribe.)

Meanwhile, as the portion of the St. Croix Band that remained in the St. Croix river valley were not based on any reservation, most received no allotments and little in the way of educational or health services from the US Federal government. People in northern Wisconsin began to refer to the St. Croix Band as "the lost tribe". Unlike neighboring Tribes existing on resources available on their respective Reservations, the St. Croix Band adapted to the rise of the logging industry by utilizing it as a source of wage labor. St. Croix Band members frequently worked as lumberjacks and river drivers.

=== Re-establishment ===
By 1902, the Rice Lake Band of Mississippi Chippewa that had removed to the White Earth Indian Reservation returned to east-central Minnesota. They settled on the south side of Sandy Lake, just north of McGregor. A small group of Rice River Band of St. Croix Band who returned with them established the Minisinaakwaang Village at East Lake, located south of McGregor.

In 1934, under the Indian Reorganization Act, St. Croix Band in Wisconsin reorganized under a written constitution and regained federal recognition, as the St. Croix Chippewa Indians of Wisconsin. The Minisinaakwaang Village, Lake Lena Village, Kettle River and Snake River communities of the St. Croix Band in Minnesota became part of the Mille Lacs Band of Ojibwe when the Minnesota Chippewa Tribe was established.

Today, the St. Croix Band communities in Minnesota form the Mille Lacs Indian Reservation District III, located primarily in Pine County. The Minisinaakwaang Village serves as the government center for the Mille Lacs Indian Reservation District II.

== See also ==
- St. Croix Chippewa Indians of Wisconsin
- Mille Lacs Band of Ojibwe
