= Pillager Band of Chippewa Indians =

Mississippi settlers, known for military role

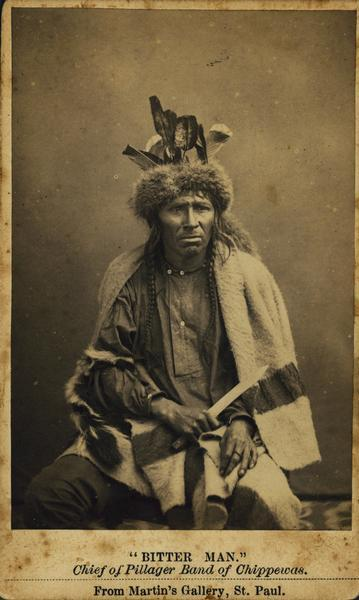
Bitter-Man Chief of the Pillager band of Chippewa

Pillager Band of Chippewa Indians (or simply the Pillagers; Makandwewininiwag in the Ojibwe language) are a historical band of Chippewa (Ojibwe) who settled at the headwaters of the Mississippi River in present-day Minnesota. Their name "Pillagers" is a translation of Makandwewininiwag, which literally means "Pillaging Men". The French called them Pilleurs, also a translation of their name. The French and Americans adopted their autonym for their military activities as the advance guard of the Ojibwe in the invasion of the Dakota country.

== History ==
=== Names ===
Their name has been variously recorded as:

- Chippeways of Leech Lake (Lewis and Clark, 1806), English transliteration of French name adopted from other Algonquian-speaking people
- Pilleurs (Henry, 1809), the French name, meaning 'plunderers'
- Rogues (Henry, 1809)
- Pilliers (Franklin, 1824), variation of the French
- Robbers (Franklin, 1824)
- Pillagers (Treaty of Fond du Lac with the United States, 1847)

By the mid-nineteenth century, records showed that scholars and Indian agents were generally using the band's Ojibwe name, although they struggled to render the spelling in the best way to convey pronunciation:

- Muk-im-dua-win-in-e-wug (Warren, 1852)
- Muk-me-dua-win-in-e-wug (Warren, 1852)
- Muk-un-dua-win-in-e-wing (Ramsey, 1852)
- Mukundua (Schoolcraft, 1852)
- Muk-un-dua-win-in-e-wug (Schoolcraft, 1852)
- Mukundwa (Schoolcraft, 1855)
- Mukkundwas (Schoolcraft, 1855)
- Cypowais plunderers (Beltrami, quoted by Neill, 1858, a combination of French and English terms)
- Makandwewininiwag (Baraga, 1878)
- Ma'kandwäwininiwag (William Jones, 1905)

=== Sub-bands ===
The Pillagers at the time had several sub-bands, identified by location. These included the following:

- Northern Bands
  - Red Cedar (Cass) Lake Band of Chippewa Indians (Gaa-miskwaawaakokaag - "where there are many red cedar")^{1}
  - Turtle Portage Band of Chippewa Indians, located about Turtle River and Turtle Lake, between Leech Lake and Red Lake.^{2}
  - Lake Winnibigoshish Band of Chippewa Indians (Wiinibiigoonzhishiwininiwag)
- Eastern Bands
  - Leech Lake Band of Ojibwe (Gaa-zagaskwaajimekaag Ojibweg)
    - Bear Island (on Leech Lake)
    - Boy Lake
    - Pine Point (on Leech Lake)
  - Pillager (Makandwewininiwag)
    - Upper Crow Wing River (Gaagaagiwigwani-ziibiwiniwag, literally ″Raven's Wing River Men″)
    - Wing River
- Western Bands
  - Otter Tail Lake Band of Chippewa Indians
  - Otter Tail River
1. There also was a similarly named different Red Cedar Lake Band of Lake Superior Chippewa who was amalgamated with the Lac Courte Oreilles Band of Lake Superior Chippewa Indians.
2. There also was a similarly named different Turtle Portage Band of Lake Superior Chippewa who was amalgamated with the Lac du Flambeau Band of Lake Superior Chippewa.

=== Unification ===
Through the treaty process with the United States, the Pillager Band were settled on reservations in north-central Minnesota. A majority were placed on the following three reservations, established under the 1855 Treaty of Washington 10 Stat. 1165:

- Cass Lake Reservation
- Lake Winnibigoshish Reservation
- Leech Lake Reservation

Through additional treaties with the United States, the Leech Lake and Lake Winnibigoshish reservations were nearly doubled in size in the late nineteenth century.

When the White Earth Reservation was created in 1867, the western Pillagers living about Otter Tail Lake agreed to relocate to that reservation so they would no longer be landless.

In 1934, the Cass Lake, Lake Winnibigoshish and Leech Lake Pillagers, together with the White Oak Point Reservation of the Mississippi Chippewa and the Removable Lake Superior Chippewa Bands of the Chippewa Reservation, agreed to a merger and re-organization. Together, these central Minnesota peoples formed today's Leech Lake Band of Ojibwe, consolidated chiefly on the Leech Lake Indian Reservation.

The successors apparent of the Pillagers are:

- Leech Lake Band of Ojibwe
- White Earth Band of Chippewa

In turn, that year the Leech Lake and White Earth bands participated in writing a constitution for a new tribal government. They were two of six bands that formed the Minnesota Chippewa Tribe for their overall government and services within the area of the state.
