= Grand Portage Indian Reservation =

Indian reservation in Minnesota, United States

Coordinates: 47°57′41″N 89°45′34″W

Location of Grand Portage Indian Reservation

The Grand Portage Indian Reservation (Ojibwe: Gichi-onigamiing) is the Indian reservation of the Grand Portage Band of Minnesota Chippewa Tribe, a federally recognized tribe in Minnesota.

The reservation is in Cook County near the tip of Minnesota's Arrowhead Region in the extreme northeast part of the state. Historically, the community was considered part of the Lake Superior Band of Chippewa but is not a party to the treaties that group signed. The reservation was established as part of the 1854 Treaty of La Pointe.

The unincorporated community of Grand Portage is located within the Grand Portage Indian Reservation.

Since 1934, Grand Portage has been one of the six bands of the Minnesota Chippewa Tribe, which wrote a constitution and initiated its new government in 1936. In the federal 2020 census, the reservation had a population of 618. The Minnesota Chippewa Tribe reported in July 2007 that Grand Portage had 1,127 people enrolled in the band.

== Geography ==
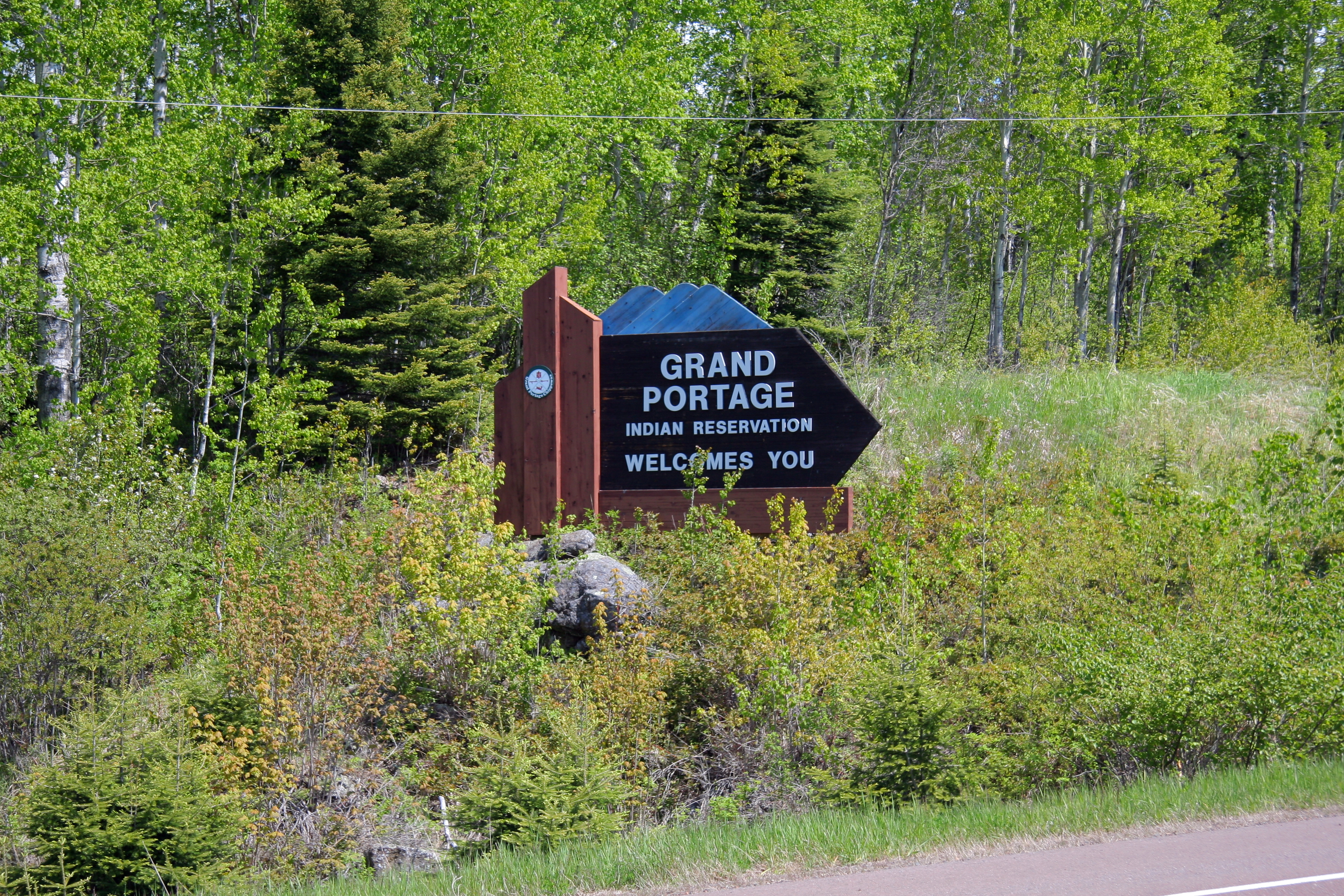
Sign on Highway 61

According to the United States Census Bureau, the Grand Portage reservation has a total area of 75.7 square miles (196 km^{2}), of which 74.47 square miles (192.9 km^{2}) is land and 1.23 square miles (3.2 km^{2}) is water. The Grand Portage Band also had 0.056 square miles (36 acres; 0.15 km^{2}) of off-reservation trust land as of 2020.

== Demographics ==
As of the census of 2020, the total population living on the reservation was 618. The population density was 8.3 inhabitants per square mile (3.2/km^{2}). There were 328 housing units at an average density of 4.4 per square mile (1.7/km^{2}). The racial makeup of the reservation was 63.1% Native American, 24.3% White, 0.8% Asian, 0.2% Black or African American, 0.2% Pacific Islander, and 11.5% from two or more races. Ethnically, the population was 1.8% Hispanic or Latino of any race.

== Economy ==
The Grand Portage National Monument is located on the reservation and managed by the National Park Service. The site includes a reconstructed trading post which is authentic for the 18th century. The community operates a casino, the Grand Portage Lodge and Casino.

== Notable people ==
- Ruth A. Myers (1926–2001), activist, "Grandmother of American Indian Education in Minnesota"
- George Morrison (1919–2000), painter, sculptor

== See also ==
- Minnesota Indian Affairs Council
