= Minnesota Chippewa Tribe =

Governmental authority for six Ojibwe bands in Minnesota

- Tribal flag
- Motto: Nimaamawiinomin We Come Together
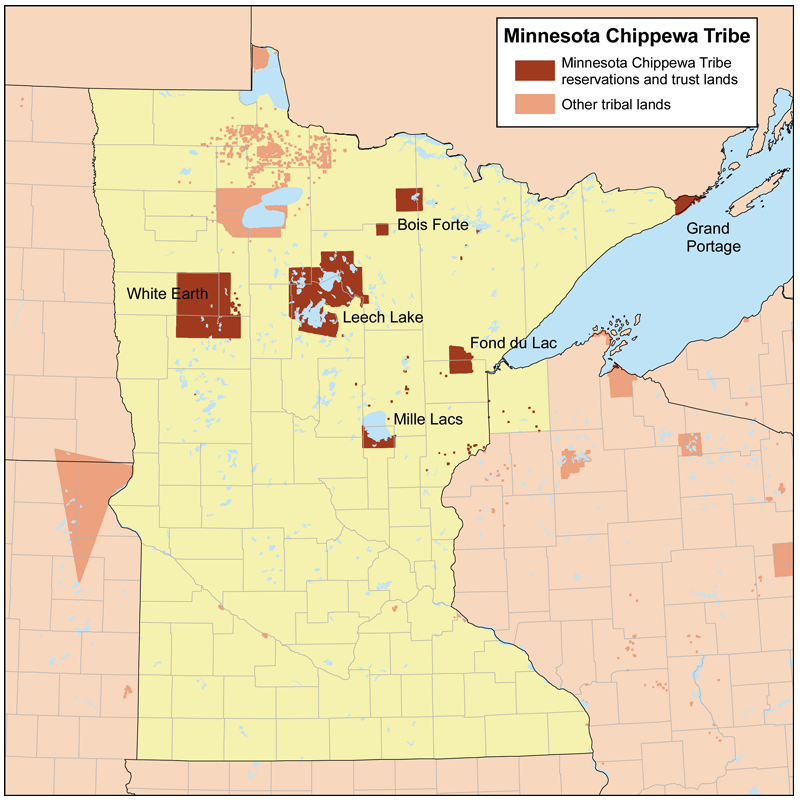
- Member bands of the Minnesota Chippewa Tribe
- Administrative headquarters: Cass Lake, Minnesota
- Type: Tribal governmental authority
- Enrolled membership: 40,677

Leaders
  - President: Michael LaRoque
  - Vice President: Faron Jackson, Sr.
  - Executive Director: Joel Smith

Establishment
  - Establishment: June 18, 1934
  - Recognized by the United States Department of the Interior: July 26, 1936

The Minnesota Chippewa Tribe is the centralized governmental authority for six Ojibwe bands in Minnesota. The tribe was created on June 18, 1934. The organization and its governmental powers are divided between the tribe, and the individual bands, which directly operate their reservations. The bands that make up the tribe are:

- Bois Forte Band of Chippewa
- Fond du Lac Band of Lake Superior Chippewa
- Grand Portage Band of Chippewa
- Leech Lake Band of Ojibwe
- Mille Lacs Band of Ojibwe
- White Earth Band of Ojibwe

As of July 2003, the six bands had 40,677 enrolled members. The White Earth Band was the largest, which had more than 19,000 members. According to the 2010 US Census, the Leech Lake Band had 10,660 residents living on its reservation, the most of any single reservation in the state.

It is projected that the tribe will experience a gradual population decrease in the coming decades, unless it lowers its current membership requirement of at least 25% Native ancestry, as a consequence of tribal members having children with non-Native Americans (nationwide, 54-61% of all Native Americans marry non-Natives).

Notably, the Red Lake Band of Chippewa is not part of the Minnesota Chippewa Tribe. In 1934, it declined to participate, as its citizens did not want to give up the band's system of hereditary chiefs. The Red Lake Band developed its constitution in the 1950s, electing its first chairman in 1959. The Chippewa nation predates the European colonization of the Americas.

== Services ==
The Minnesota Chippewa Tribe provides basic services to each of its six-member Bands, unless the individual Band has signed a compact to provide these services themselves. The services are provided through their offices located in Cass Lake, Minnesota.

- Administration
  - Executive Direction
  - Tribal Operations
    - Enrollment
  - Accounting & Liquor Licenses
  - Human Resources
- Education
  - Scholarship Information
  - Johnson O’Malley
  - Indian Boarding Schools
- Finance Corporation
  - Home Loans
  - Business Loans
  - Homes for Sale
- Human Services
  - Senior Services
  - Investment, Employment and Welfare
  - Food Stamp Nutrition Education
