= Ojibwe history =

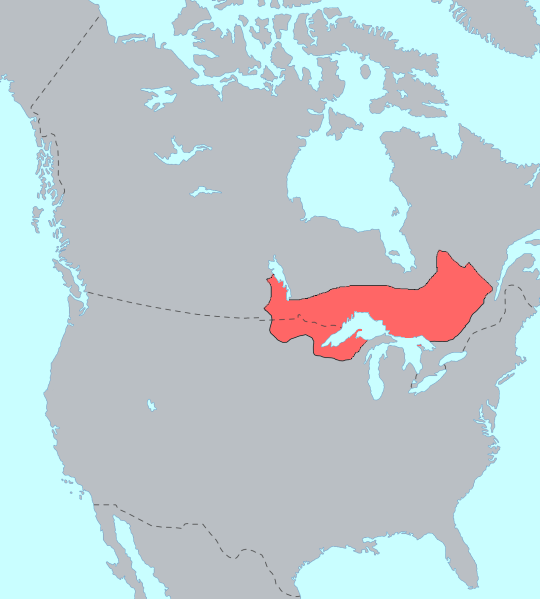
Precontact distribution of Ojibwe-speaking people

The history of the Ojibwe begins with the ancestors of the modern Ojibwe residing along the Atlantic coast, in modern-day New Brunswick and south-eastern Quebec. Somewhere between the 6th and 10th centuries the Ojibwe would slowly migrate further inland.

The ancestors of the Ojibwe would then form a confederacy called Council of Three Fires. When the confederacy reached Mackinac Island they formed into three distinct nations.

They reached the Great Lakes sometime around the 12th to 13th centuries. Then by around 1500, the Ojibwe reached Lake Superior and would later settle modern-day Wisconsin, where Madeline Island would become a significant part of the Ojibwe nation. From Madeline Island the Ojibwe would later reach what is today Minnesota.

Sometime between 16th century and the early 17th century they gained contact with the French, where diplomatic relations were positive. Following the European contact the Ojibwe developed a common identity. The Ojibwe would side with the French during the Fox Wars, Beaver Wars, and Seven Years' War. Simultaneously the Ojibwe entered the North American fur trade, where they traded with the Europeans and exchanged each others customs and traditions. However, the French would destabilize the region, being partially responsible for the start of the Dakota-Ojibwe War.

The Ojibwe would later settle in what is modern day Ontario after wars with the Iroquois. They would came into contact with the Mandan along the southern shores of the Red River.

By the 19th century they were beginning to perceive themselves as a nation or tribe. During the second half of the 19th century, Ojibwe bands were forced to onto reservations by the United States government and continue to face hardships caused by the federal government.

The dreamcatcher originated from the Ojibwe and became a popular commercial item in the late 20th century and became a symbol for the Pan-Indian movement. In the 21st century they are one of the largest Indigenous ethnic groups in North America.

== Background ==
The Ojibwe language belongs to the Algonquian language family and the Ojibwe culturally belong to the Anishinaabe.

The Ojibwe never existed under a unified central government. Professor Anton Treuer states that they functioned as a group of independent villages with similarities in language and culture. The Ojibwe lived in small kinship groups, each an extended family that was politically autonomous, although they met with other groups for specific occasions and exchanged members for marriage, ensuring regular contact between different Ojibwe groups.

Ojibwe society followed a clan system and a person’s clan had a big impact on their positions in society; for example, warriors were traditionally from clans like the bear clan. Members of a clan were seen as close family members with intermarriage within a clan being forbidden.

According to Patricia Loew, there was originally 7 clans: Crane, Loon, Fish, Marten, Deer, Bear, and Bird. But according to William Warren, there was originally five clans but around his life time (19th century) there was about 15 to 21 clans. Originally all Ojibwe civil chiefs were part of the loon or crane clans, but as the Ojibwe moved west during the 1700s warrior clans began to dominate.

== Pre-contact history ==
Most historians are of the view that the ancestral homeland of the Ojibwe was at the mouth of St. Lawrence River on the east coast. The Ojibwe were in an alliance with the Odawa and the Potawatomi along the Atlantic Coast. Archeology confirms that the Ojibwe moved slowly in small groups over a period of hundreds of years starting from St Lawrence to the central Great Lakes.

According to Treuer, natural food resources along the Atlantic coast was so large that it sustained a massive and dense population greater than that of Western Europe. However, when the Ojibwe formed as a distinct group in the Algonquian language family, the population density resulted in competitions among tribes over land and resources. This tribal warfare along with prophecies resulted in the Ojibwe moving westward around the 6th century CE. It is unclear if other tribes contested this migration or not.

Oral tradition states that these people faced many hardships along their journey.According to Encyclopedia.com, the ojibwe and other people began migrating to the Great Lakes around 900 AD. Although reasons for this migration are unclear it may have been due to contact with the Vikings.

According to oral histories and Wiigwaasabak birch bark scrolls, the ancestors of other tribes such as the Bodewadami, Mascouten, and Miami peoples undertook a Great Migration from the mouth of the St. Lawrence River to the Upper Great Lakes some time before European arrival. These Algonquian people people from the East Coast were driven west when Iroquoian peoples migrated to the region from central Canada and took their original homelands.

=== Formation of Council of Three Fires ===
The Ojibwe, Potawatomi, and the Odawa formed the Council of Three Fires. Council of the three fires was not a formal confederation, but these people allied themselves for military and political reasons.

Using the Midewiwin scrolls, Potawatomi elder Shup-Shewana dated the formation of the Council of Three Fires to 796 AD at Michilimackinac. Although according to Bayfield historical society, the confederacy was likely formed in the 16th century as a response to the expansionism of the Iroquois Confederacy.

=== Great Lakes Migrations ===
Ancestors of the Ojibwe are believed to have reached the Great Lakes region since about 1200CE.

== Early presence in Michigan ==
Mackinac Island became the origin for several important anishinabeeg clans. Most scholars agree that the split between the Ojibwe, Odawa, and Potawatomi took place on the island where they became distinct nations. The Anishinbeg became well established in the upper peninsula of Michigan by 1500.

It is likely that the Ojibwa that resided at Sault Ste Marie originated from the original Proto-Algonquian homeland residing between Lake Huron and Lake Ontario. Originally, the northern peninsula of Michigan was largely claimed by the Ojibwe nation. There was also the Noquet located in the region, the tribe is culturally and linguistically connected to the Menominee, who dominated the central Upper Peninsula for centuries prior to and during initial European contact, but gradually disappeared due to assimilation with the Ojibwe and Menominee.

== Early contact with the Europeans ==
Jacques Cartier entered St. Lawrence River in 1535. According to Warren, he first discovered the Ojibwe in the Bay of Shaug-a-waum-ik-ong.

In 1609, Samuel de Champlain killed two Iroquois chiefs. Champlain had an army of many Native Americans and possibly including the Ojibwe, Champlain may have been the first European to describe the Ojibwe at the French River.Étienne Brûlé was sent by Champlain to learn the language of the Huron and the Algonquin. Brûlé didn't leave any written records of his travels but it's generally accepted that he was the first European to settle in the heartland of Ojibwe country, Sault Ste. Marie and possibly Lake Superior. Sometime around this point the Ojibwe were well established at Sault Ste. Marie and the surrounding area. When the French encountered them at Sault Ste. Marie in the 1640s, they called them the Saulteurs, meaning "People of the Rapids."

=== Catholic missionaries ===
Roman Catholic missionaries followed, with Ojibwe first encountering Franciscans in 1622 and the Jesuits in 1641. In the 1670s the Jesuits established a mission at the Sault, with a sparse Roman Catholic missionary effort continuing through the 18th century.

=== The Pageant of the Sault ===
On June 4, 1671, Simon-François Daumont de Saint-Lusson, a colonial agent, was dispatched from Quebec to the distant tribes, proposing a congress of Indian nations at the Falls of St. Mary between Lake Huron and Lake Superior. Trader Nicolas Perrot helped attract the principal chiefs, and representatives of 14 Indigenous nations were invited for the elaborate ceremony. The French officials proclaimed France's appropriation of the immense territory surrounding Lake Superior in the name of King Louis XIV.

The Ojibwe were missing the point of the ceremony and interpreted the ceremony as declaring mutual support and friendship. When in reality the French were attempting to take over the area and asked the natives to submit to the king of France.

According to William Warren, Shadawish was at this event and the French gave him a gold medal. According to journalist Robert Silbernagel, the founder of the Cadotte family was also present at the event.

At the end of the ceremony, the French placed a heart-shaped gold medal upon the chest of Ke-che-ne-zuh-yauh. According to French diplomatic custom he was recognized as chief of the Lake Superior Chippewa and principal chief of the Ojibwe tribe. (Note: However, this designation reflects a European misunderstanding of Ojibwe government, as Ojibwe were a decentralized band society in which no single leader held authority over the entire people.)

=== Enters the Fur Trade ===
Interactions with the French during the fur trade resulted in: increase in standard of living, population growth, growth of political power, expansion of territory.

The Ojibwe were influential during the fur trade too the point Europeans adopted Ojibwe customs. French and British favored Ojibwe customs of bartering, cooperative diplomacy, meeting in councils, and the use of pipes.

During the fur trade the Ojibwe had a positive relationship with the Dakota. In 1679, the Ojibwe and the Dakota formed an alliance at Fond du Lac; the Ojibwe agreed to give the Dakota fur in exchange that the Dakota allowed Ojibwe to move west toward the Mississippi.

== Lake Superior migrations ==
By around 1500 the Ojibwe reached Lake Superior from the east parts of the Great Lakes region.Sometime before 1745, Shadawish led his extended family to the headwater of the Wisconsin River near Lac Vieux Desert, becoming the first Ojibwe to settle in what is today mainland Wisconsin.

=== Migration to western parts of Lake Superior ===
Exactly when the Ojibwe reached the western part of the lake is a debate among historians and scholars. According to historian Laura Peers, “entho-historians have generally concluded that Ojibwa were not present in the area north or west of Lake Superior until the mid-1700s”.

The first Ojibwe who arrived in Chequamegon were hunters looking to expand their hunting territory from the Keneenaw Peninsula.

==== Madeline Island, and the formation of La Pointe ====
When exactly the Ojibwe made Madeline Island a seasonal home is a debate among historians and scholars. Reportedly the Ojibwe moved to Madeline Island to defend themselves from the Fox, Dakota, and other Native American nations.

According to historian Jacob Jurss, around 1650 the Ojibwe established one of the largest settlements on Lake Superior called Shagwaamikong or La Pointe. According to historian William Whipple Warren, "for a number of years the Ojibways continued to consider the bay of Shag-a-waum-ik-ong as their common home, and their hunting parties returned thither at different seasons of at the year."

In 1831, Henry Rowe Schoolcraft said about the island, "the focus from which, as radii from a centre, the ancient population emigrated; and the interior bands consequently look back to it with something of the feelings of parental relations." According to Ojibwe author Thomas Peacock the island is "the great homeland of the Ojibwe. Most of our Ojibwe ancestors originally came from Madeline Island."

According to a copper plate that belong to chief Tagwagane the Ojibwe settled on Madeline Island long before Columbus reached the New World, based on the 9 indications on the plate and the excepted life expectancy of 40 years this would indicate the Ojibwe settled a village on the island around the 1490s.

However, modern historians generally follow Harold Hickerson's view that the Ojibwe didn't reside on the Island until after 1680. According to Dr Schenck there is no archeological evidence that indicates that a large Ojibwe settlement at La Pointe before 1718, there is however evidence that Ojibwe or Saulteur bands around the area before the establishment of a village.

Some annthropologists like Robert Mazrim state that archeology supports an earlier presence of Ojibwe on the island.

==== Migration to Minnesota ====
Many Ojibwe bands from La Pointe moved westward into what is today Minnesota, they brought with them Midewiwin.

=== Migration to southern Ontario ===
Ojibwe migrated into southern Ontario from Great lakes region around the 1680s. The Ojibwe during this time defeated the Iroquois who expelled their Huron allies from the region. According to historian Dr Peter S. Schmalz, "In the late seventeenth and eighteenth centuries, the Ojibwa were the largest and most influential ethnic group in this region."

The only groups identifiable as Ojibwe residing at Kaministikwia River during this time were the Saulters by 1718 and the Ouace (believed to be an Ojibwe clan) by 1730.

== Iron Confederacy ==
The Iron Confederacy or Iron Confederation (also known as Cree-Assiniboine in English or Nehiyaw-Pwat in Cree) was a political and military alliance of Plains Indians of what is now Western Canada and the northern United States. This confederacy included various individual bands that formed political, hunting and military alliances in defense against common enemies. The ethnic groups that made up the Confederacy were the branches of the Cree that moved onto the Great Plains around 1740 (the southern half of this movement eventually became the "Plains Cree" and the northern half the "Woods Cree"), the Saulteaux (Plains Ojibwa), the Nakoda or Stoney people also called Pwat or Assiniboine, and the Métis and Haudenosaunee (who had come west with the fur trade). The Confederacy rose to predominance on the northern Plains during the height of the North American fur trade when they operated as middlemen controlling the flow of European goods, particularly guns and ammunition, to other Indigenous nations (the "Indian Trade"), and the flow of furs to the Hudson's Bay Company (HBC) and North West Company (NWC) trading posts. Its peoples would take part in the bison (buffalo) hunt, and the pemmican trade. The decline of the fur trade and the collapse of the bison herds sapped the power of the Confederacy after the 1860s.

== Wars with British ==
=== Pontiac's War ===
Pontiac's War (also known as Pontiac's Conspiracy or Pontiac's Rebellion) was launched in 1763 by a confederation of Native Americans who were dissatisfied with British rule in the Great Lakes region following the French and Indian War (1754–1763). Warriors from numerous nations joined in an effort to drive British soldiers and settlers out of the region. The war is named after Odawa leader Pontiac, the most prominent of many Indigenous leaders in the conflict.

The war began in May 1763 when Native Americans, alarmed by policies imposed by British General Jeffery Amherst, attacked a number of British forts and settlements. Nine forts were destroyed, and hundreds of colonists were killed or captured, with many more fleeing the region. Hostilities came to an end after successful British Army expeditions in 1764 led to peace negotiations over the next two years. The Natives were unable to drive away the British, but the uprising prompted the British government to modify the policies that had provoked the conflict.

Warfare on the North American frontier was brutal; the killing of prisoners, the targeting of civilians, and other atrocities were widespread. The ruthlessness of the conflict was a reflection of a growing racial divide between indigenous peoples and British colonists. The British government sought to prevent further racial violence by issuing the Royal Proclamation of 1763, which created a boundary between colonists and Natives.

== Wars with the Americans ==
=== Battle of St. Louis ===
The Battle of St. Louis, also known as the Attack on St. Louis and the Battle of Fort San Carlos, was fought on May 26, 1780, between British-allied Indians and defenders of the Franco-Spanish village of St. Louis, Louisiana (present-day U.S. state of Missouri) during the American Revolutionary War. The garrison, a motley assortment of regulars and militiamen led by Upper Louisiana's lieutenant governor, Captain Fernando de Leyba, suffered a small number of casualties.

De Leyba fortified St. Louis as best as he could and successfully withstood the attack. On the opposite bank of the Mississippi River, a simultaneous attack on the nearby American village of Cahokia was also repulsed. The retreating British-allied Indians destroyed crops and took captive inhabitants outside the protected area. The British failed to defend their side of the river, effectively ending any attempts to gain control of the Mississippi River during the Revolutionary War.

== Wars with the Siskiwit ==
=== Tragedy of the Siskiwit ===
The Tragedy of the Siskiwit was an event that took place in the pre-contact history of the Ojibwe and Meskwaki (Fox) Indian nations in present-day Wisconsin. As part of an ongoing series of conflicts between the two nations, a chief's son was kidnapped, and both groups had their camps destroyed.

=== Fox Wars ===
The Fox Wars were two conflicts between the French and the Meskwaki (historically Fox) people who lived in the Great Lakes region (particularly near Fort Pontchartrain du Détroit) from 1712 to 1733. (Note: In their book The Fox Wars, Edmunds and Peyser discuss the difficulties in nomenclature, saying, "They referred to themselves as Mesquakies, as do the modern Mesquakie people near Tama, Iowa. In the late seventeenth and early eighteenth centuries, however, other Algonquian tribes of the western Great Lakes region and upper Mississippi Valley frequently called them Outagami, using a Chippewa word meaning 'People of the Opposite Shore.' In contrast, the French almost always referred to the Mesquakies as Renards, or 'Foxes.' Almost 90 percent of the anthropological and historical references to the tribe also use the term Fox…since most anthropologists and historians use the term Fox, as do most library reference systems, we finally decided generally to use Fox when discussing our subject." "Preface" in Edmunds, R. David and Joseph L. Peyser, The Fox Wars: The Mesquakie Challenge to New France (University of Oklahoma Press: Norman, 1993), xviii.) These territories are known today as the states of Michigan and Wisconsin in the United States. The Wars exemplified colonial warfare in the transitional space of New France, occurring within the complex system of alliances and enmities with native peoples and colonial plans for expansion.

The Meskwaki controlled the Fox River system in eastern Wisconsin. This river was vital for the fur trade between French Canada and the North American interior, because it allowed river travel from Green Bay in Lake Michigan to the Mississippi River. The French wanted the rights to use the river system to gain access to both the Mississippi and trade contacts with tribes to the west.

The wars claimed thousands of lives and initiated a slave trade whereby Meskwaki were captured by native allies of New France and then sold as slaves to the French colonial population. Indeed, alliances between the French and other native groups (such as the Odawa, Miami and Sioux) as well as those between the Meskwaki and other native groups (such as the Sauk, Mascouten and Kickapoo) were an important aspect of the Wars, influencing every stage of the conflicts, including the causes, the fighting and the conclusion.

The First Fox War (1712–1716) began with inter-alliance violence and ended with the surrender of a large group of Meskwaki and the subsequent peace deal. As was custom, peace offerings required the exchange of goods and of prisoners to account for those who died in the conflict, acknowledging the importance of this exchange for establishing peace. The Second Fox War (1728–1733) was far more destructive than the first, and ended with the near annihilation of the Meskwaki population.

== Dakota-Ojibwe War ==
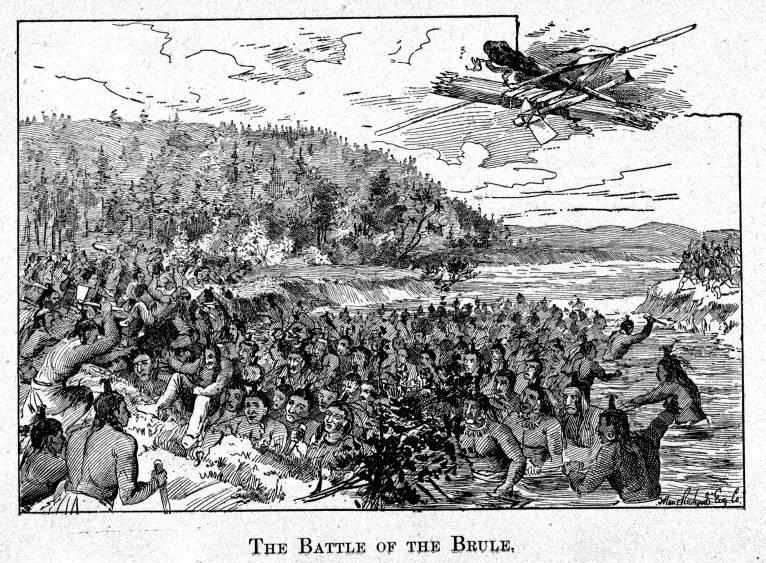
The Battle of the Brule was an important battle in the Dakota-Ojibwe War.

In 1736/9, the Alliance between the Dakota and Ojibwe collapsed due to French intervention. The Ojibwe and Dakota warred for control over modern-day northern Minnesota and Wisconsin. There was a brief peace, organized by Ojibwe Chief Nittum, that lasted from 1787-1794. American attempts at peace would largely fail. Despite major Ojibwe gains, they were never able to advance into the Great Plains. By the 1850s, large areas of land ceded to the United States began to make waging war impossible. The last battle, the Battle of Shakopee, occurred in 1858. By then, there was already no longer a shared border between the two tribes due to territorial cessions. After the Battle of Shakopee, both tribes were forced onto reservations.

=== Dakota War of 1862 ===
In the Dakota War of 1862, a group of Ojibwe volunteers fought against the Dakota on behalf of the United States, As many Ojibwe continued to consider the Dakota enemies. Chiefs Naw-Gaw-Nub (also spelled 'Ne-Bah-Quah-Om') and Shin-Gwack sent a letter to Minnesota Governor Alexander Ramsey on September 2, 1862, asking for permission to fight the Dakota. This offer was accepted. However, the Ojibwe never saw any actual conflict as the war ended on September 26.

== 19th century ==
By around the 1840s, the population of the Ojibwe numbered around 30,000 and resided across much of North America from: the majority of the northern parts of Lake Huron; parts of North Dakota; eastern part of Montana; the American shore of Lake Superior and northern parts of Minnesota; southeastern parts of Saskatchewan; parts of Manitoba such as eastern part of Lake Winnipeg and south parts of the province; and not too far from James Bay.

At this point in history scholars recognize five tribal sections of the Ojibwe:

- Southeast Chippewa of Michigan's Lower Peninsula and adjacent Ontario
- Chippewa of Lake Superior
- Southwestern Chippewas of interior Minnesota
- Northern Chippewa of the Laurentian uplands above the Great Lakes
- Plains Ojibwa

=== Battle of sugar point ===
The Battle of Sugar Point, or the Battle of Leech Lake, was fought on October 5, 1898 between the 3rd U.S. Infantry and members of the Pillager Band of Chippewa Indians in a failed attempt to apprehend Pillager Ojibwe Bugonaygeshig ("Old Bug" or "Hole-In-The-Day"), as the result of a dispute with Indian Service officials on the Leech Lake Reservation in Cass County, Minnesota.

Often referred to as "the last Indian Uprising in the United States", the engagement was also the first battle to be fought in the area of the United States known as the Old Northwest since the Black Hawk War in 1832.

The last Medal of Honor issued during the Indian Wars was awarded to Private Oscar Burkard of the 3rd U.S. Infantry Regiment.

=== Forced Relocations and Reservations ===
==== Treaty of La Pointe ====
The first treaty of La Pointe was signed by Robert Stuart for the United States and representatives of the Ojibwe Bands of Lake Superior and the Mississippi River on October 4, 1842 and proclaimed on March 23, 1843, encoded into the laws of the United States as 7 Stat. 591. By this treaty, the Ojibwa ceded extensive tracts of land that are now parts of the states of Wisconsin and Michigan, specifically the latter's Upper Peninsula.

==== Sandy Lake Tragedy ====
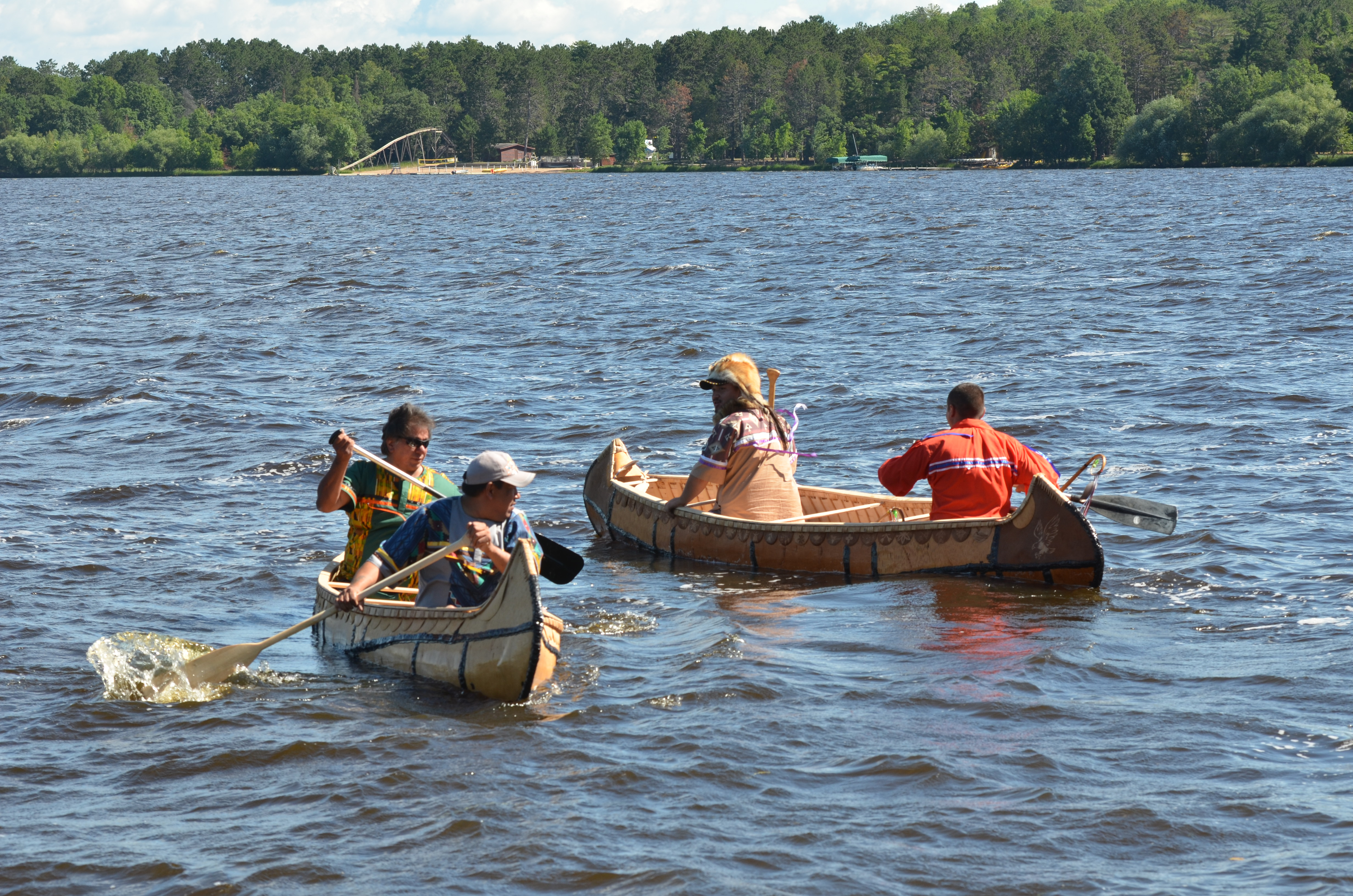
U.S. Army Corps of Engineers and members of the Ojibwa nation canoe across Big Sandy Lake in honor of those who died in the Sandy Lake Tragedy (Big Sandy Camp is near the top left corner of the picture)

The Sandy Lake Tragedy was the culmination in 1850 of a series of events centered in Big Sandy Lake, Minnesota that resulted in the deaths of several hundred Lake Superior Chippewa. Officials of the Zachary Taylor Administration and Minnesota Territory sought to relocate several bands of the tribe to areas west of the Mississippi River. By changing the location for fall annuity payments, the officials intended the Chippewa to stay at the new site for the winter, hoping to lower their resistance to relocation. Due to delayed and inadequate payments of annuities and lack of promised supplies, about 400 Ojibwe, mostly men and 12% of the tribe, died of disease, starvation and cold. The outrage increased Ojibwe resistance to removal. The bands effectively gained widespread public support to achieve permanent reservations in their traditional territories.

==== Nelson Act of 1889 ====
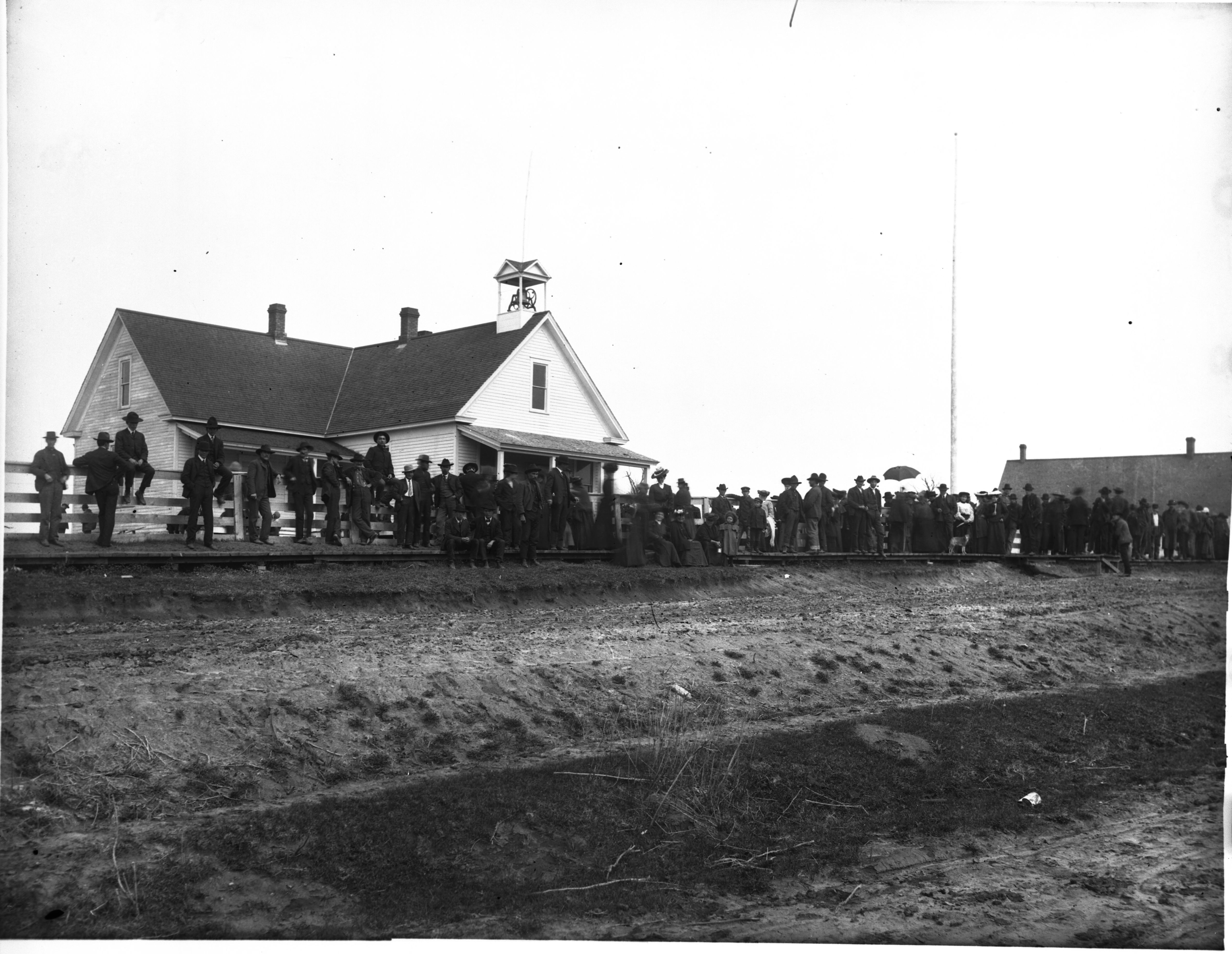
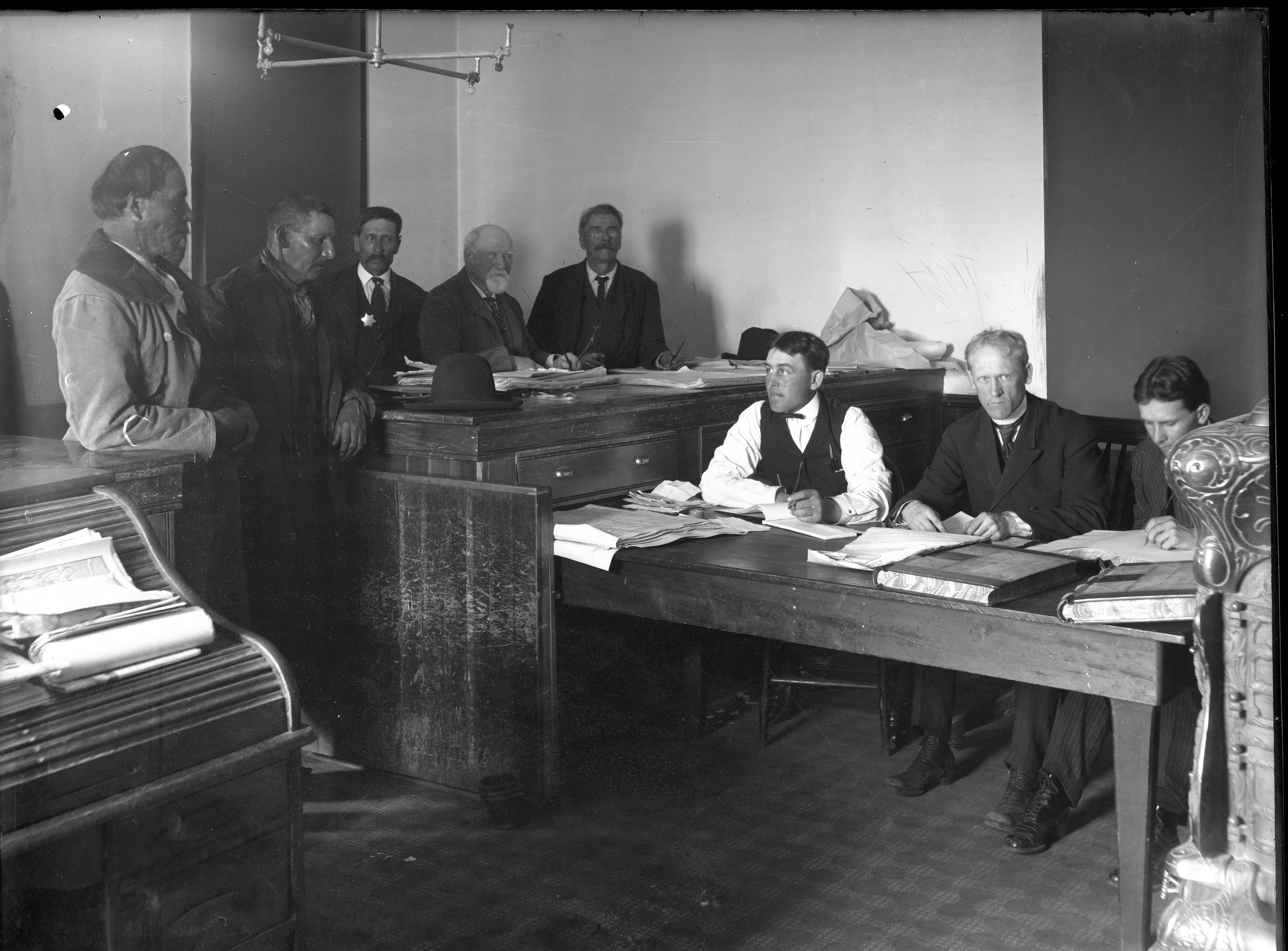
Ojibwe Indians awaiting their allotments at the White Earth Reservation

An act for the relief and civilization of the Chippewa Indians in the State of Minnesota (51st-1st-Ex.Doc.247; 25 Stat. 642), commonly known as the Nelson Act of 1889, was a United States federal law intended to relocate all the Anishinaabe people in Minnesota to the White Earth Indian Reservation in the western part of the state, and expropriate the vacated reservations for sale to non-Native settlers.

Approved by Congress on January 14, 1889, the Nelson Act was the equivalent for reservations in Minnesota to the Dawes Act of 1887, which had mandated allotting communal Indian lands to individual households in Indian Country, and selling the surplus. The goal of the Nelson Act was to consolidate Native Americans within the state of Minnesota on a western reservation, and, secondly, to encourage allotment of communal lands to individual households in order to encourage subsistence farming and assimilation. It reflected continuing tensions between whites and American Indians in the state. Especially after the Dakota Conflict of 1862, many Minnesota residents were eager to consolidate the reservations, reduce the amount of land controlled by Indians and make the surplus available for sale and settlement by non-Natives.

Minnesota congressmen Knute Nelson pushed for the allotment of Ojibwe lands in Northern Minnesota and sale of "surplus" to non-Natives. He and others intended to force the Ojibwe to relinquish most of their reservation lands. The intention was to relocate the peoples to the westernmost White Earth Reservation. All would receive individual allotments, with the remainder to be available for sale to non-Natives. The Red Lake Band of Chippewa agreed to a cession of 3,000,000 acres of land and kept the southern portion of their Reservation adjacent to Red Lake.

==== Treaty of Old Crossing ====
The Pembina and Red Lake bands of Chippewa ceded to the United States the Red River Valley of the north in two treaties. Both were named for the treaty site, "Old Crossing" and the year, Treaty of Old Crossing (1863) and the Treaty of Old Crossing (1864). In Minnesota, the ceded territory included all land west of a line running generally southwest from the Lake of the Woods to Thief Lake, about 30 miles (48 km) west of Red Lake, and then angling southeast to the headwaters of the Wild Rice River near the divide separating the watersheds of the Red River of the North and the Mississippi River. In North Dakota, the ceded territory was all of the Red River Valley north of the Sheyenne River. In size, the area was roughly 127 miles (204 km) east-west and 188 miles (303 km) north-south, making it nearly 11,000,000 acres (45,000 km^{2}) of prairie and forest.

"Old Crossing" on the Red Lake River (today Huot) was approximately 10 miles (16 km) southwest of Red Lake Falls. It was a river ford and layover site on the "Pembina" or "Woods" trail, of the Red River Trails between Fort Garry in Rupert's Land and St. Paul, Minnesota.

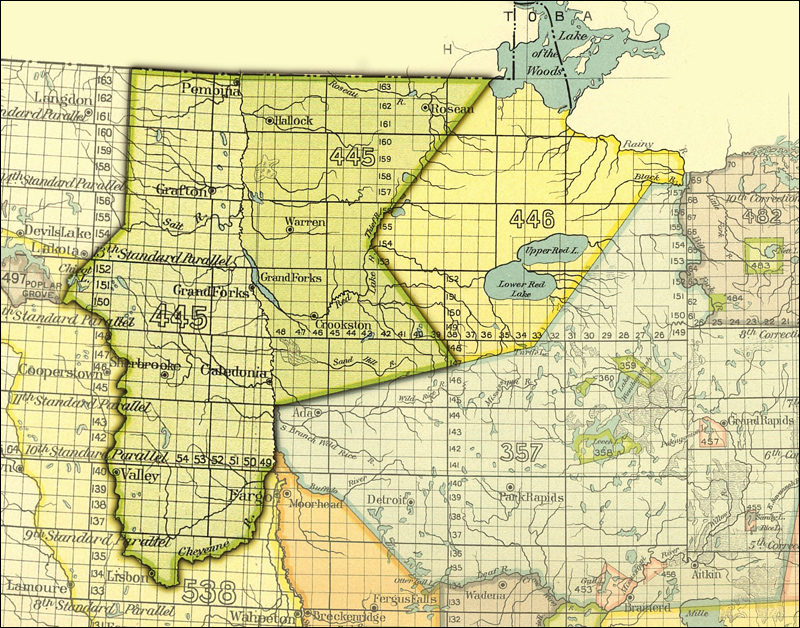
Territory ceded in Treaties of Old Crossing

== 20th Century ==
=== Wisconsin Walleye War ===
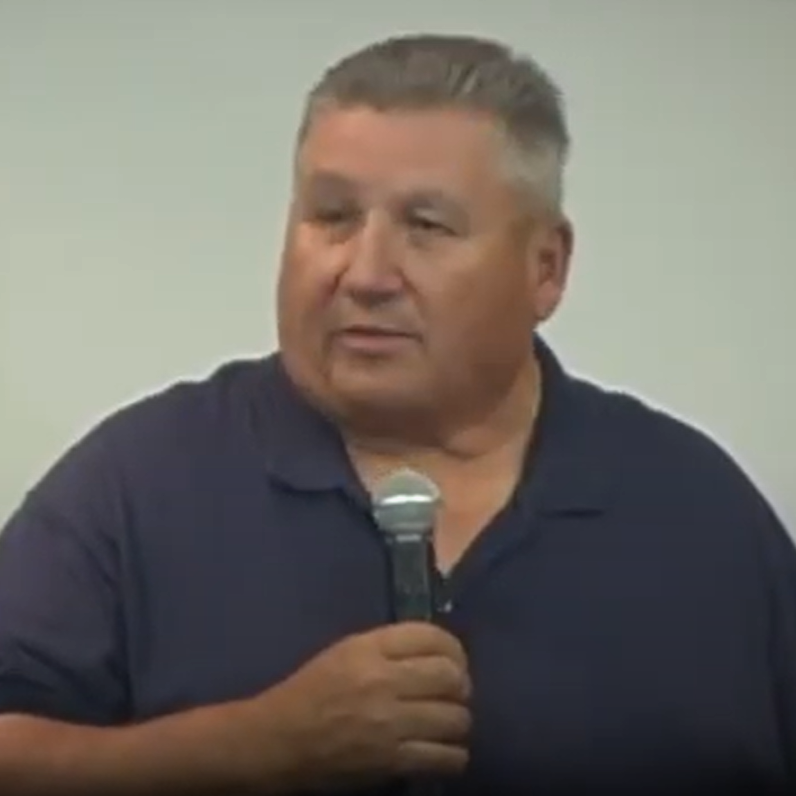
Tom Maulson served as a major figure in the Wisconsin Walleye War.

The Wisconsin Walleye War became the name for late 20th-century events in Wisconsin in protest of Ojibwe (Chippewa) hunting and fishing rights. In a 1975 case, the tribes challenged state efforts to regulate their hunting and fishing off the reservations, based on their rights in the treaties of St. Peters (1837) and La Pointe (1842). On August 21, 1987, U.S. District Court judge Barbara Crabb ruled that six Ojibwe tribal governments had the right under these treaties for hunting and fishing throughout their former territory.

Protests erupted in Wisconsin among sports fishermen and resort owners who were opposed to tribal members spearfishing walleye during spawning season. Protests continued into 1991 against the Ojibwe walleye harvests. Tribal supporters successfully petitioned federal courts to issue an injunction against the protesters, curbing the protest events at boat landings.

The events were chronicled in a Mother Jones 1991 article, books published in 1994 and 2002, and the documentary film Lighting the Seventh Fire (1995).

== 21st century ==
In Canada the Ojibwe are one of the largest First Nations. About 160,000 people are registered with the 200 First Nation bands during 2014.

According to the 2020 United States census, the Ojibwe make up the largest of the Canadian Indian alone population being at 14.9%. According to the census 39,057 people were Ojibwe alone, while 130,048 were alone or in any combination with another race or tribal group.

In 2013, the Lac du Flambeau Band of Lake Superior Chippewa re-purchased Strawberry Island, a sacred island that had been owned by a non-indigenous family. It was purchased for around $250,000. The following summer, the tribe held a celebration of the purchase on a nearby beach, attended by State Senator Robert Jauch and representatives of the Bad River and Sokaogon Chippewa tribes. Since the purchase, the island has been a protected area.

In 2025, a Catholic retreat center located on the shore of Trout Lake was returned to the Lac du Flambeau Band of Lake Superior Chippewa, in one of the first transfers of land from Catholic sisters to a tribal government.

== Genetic history ==
=== Haplogroup R1b1a1a2 (M269) ===
R1b1a1a2 (M269) is the second most common Y-DNA haplogroup found among Indigenous Americans after Y-DNA haplogroup Q. The R1b1a1a2 (M269) lineages commonly found in Native Americans are in most cases belonged to R1b1a1a2 (M269) subclade most common in western Europeans, and its highest concentration is found among a variety of the Algonquin speaking tribes in eastern North America.

Thus, according to several authors, R1b was most likely introduced through admixture during the post-1492 European settlement of North America. R1b1a1a2 (M269) is found in the Ojibwe (50-79%).

== See also ==
- History of Canada
- History of United States
- Ojibwe in Montana
