= Cut Foot Sioux =

Cut Foot Sioux may refer to:

- Battle of Cut Foot Sioux, battle of maimed Dakota warrior in Minnesota
- Cut Foot Sioux Lake, a lake in Minnesota
- Cut Foot Sioux Trail, a trail in Minnesota
