= Bayaaswaa =

Bayaaswaa (in Ojibwe, meaning "The Dry-one") was the name of two different Ojibwe chiefs.

- Bayaaswaa I (late 17th century), an Ojibwe chief from Wisconsin
- Bayaaswaa II, an Ojibwe chief from Minnesota, son of Bayaaswaa I
