= Battle of Cut Foot Sioux =

1748 battle of the Dakota-Ojibwe War

- Part of Dakota–Ojibwe War
Date	c. 1748
Location	Cut Foot Sioux Lake 47°31′N 94°3′W
Result	Inconclusive

Belligerents
Ojibwe	Dakota

Strength
Unknown	Unknown

Casualties and losses
Many killed	Many killed
- Location within Minnesota

The Battle of Cut Foot Sioux was an engagement in the wider Dakota-Ojibwe War that took place c. 1748 in present-day northern Minnesota. According to tradition and some records, the battle resulted in the maiming of a Dakota warrior's feet, from which the names for Cut Foot Sioux Lake and Cut Foot Sioux Trail were derived.

The conflict resulted in increased control by the Ojibwe over the Upper Mississippi River and the Great Lakes region.

== Background ==
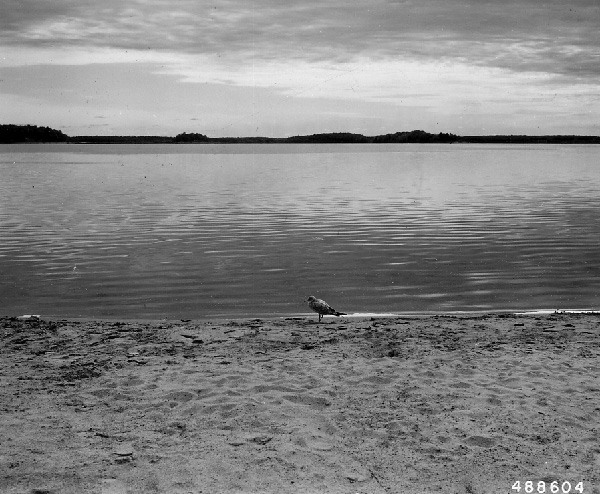
Cut Foot Sioux Lake

Since the 17th century, the French and the Ojibwe peoples had established contact and extended relations. Into the 18th century, this had developed into a formal trade and military relationship, with the Ojibwe joining the French in the Beaver Wars, Fox Wars, and wider French efforts in the American Indian Wars. As a result of increased demand for resources from this alliance, the Ojibwe began to expand westward into the Great Lakes region, and eventually northern modern-day Minnesota.

Following their arrival into the region, the Ojibwe initially had formed a tight-knit relationship with the Dakota people. The terms of the alliance allowed the Ojibwe to hunt and use the land for its natural resources, as long as the Dakota received a portion of European goods from the North American fur trade. However, as demand increased for natural resources, tensions rose between the groups over intense territorial conflicts. By the 1730s the Dakota and the Ojibwe were in a state of hostilities and prolonged war.

The Dakota were continuously pushed out of their home regions. By 1744, Ojibwe groups led by Bayaaswaa II had violently expelled the Dakota westward of the Big Sandy Lake, beginning their progressed displacement from the Mississippi River.

After earlier clashes near Big Sandy Lake in 1744, Dakota groups relocated in the area surrounding Lake Winnibigoshish and nearby Cut Foot Sioux Lake. According to later accounts, the Dakota managed to fend off the Ojibwe in early 1748 and dug a turtle-shaped intaglio mound in commemoration. However, this victory would be short felt, following continued incursions by the Ojibwe. During the summer of 1748, the Dakota organized three large war parties, in collaboration with southern and western groups of Dakota, to retaliate. These parties were then sent onto expeditions towards Big Sandy Lake, Rainy Lake, and northwest to the wider Pembina Region.

== Battle ==
The Sandy Lake party began their expedition downstream the Mississippi River before meeting a small group of Ojibwe scouts. These scouts, and their main war party, were en route to attack the Dakota village at Leech Lake. They were promptly chased by the Dakota party into present-day Cut Foot Sioux Lake where they were also met by the main Ojibwe war party. The following battle lasted for half a day along the shoreline before both parties withdrew, leaving heavy losses especially for the Dakota.

During the battle, an unnamed Dakota warrior was killed, who was found to have severed or half-cut feet. (Note: This varies by historical account, although they all agree about the feet of the warrior being at the very least maimed and severely injured.) The discovery of the body by the Ojibwe inspired the name for Cut Foot Sioux Lake and its adjacent Cut Foot Sioux Trail.

== Aftermath ==
Following the battle, the Ojibwe found the turtle mound built for the prior confrontation at Cut Foot Sioux Lake, and thus built a retaliatory snake surrounding the pre-existing turtle mound.

The Dakota people's control of the upper Mississippi was weakened. Although the battle ended with both war parties withdrawing, the effects on the Dakota were severe. Following the Battle of Cut Foot Sioux, the Dakota abandoned their Lake Leech village, and in the following years migrated towards the American prairie. The Ojibwe continued to assume control over the Upper Mississippi and present-day northern Minnesota, and had full access to the now routed Dakota villages.

== See also ==
- Lake Winnibigoshish
