= Tragedy of the Siskiwit =

Ojibwa-Meskwaki conflict in 17th century Wisconsin

The Tragedy of the Siskiwit was an event that took place in the pre-contact history of the Ojibwe and Meskwaki (Fox) Indian nations in present-day Wisconsin. As part of an ongoing series of conflicts between the two nations, a chief's son was kidnapped, and both groups had their camps destroyed.

== Background ==
The Ojibwe occupied Madeline Island as early as the 15th century, but were prevented from expanding onto mainland present-day Wisconsin by the Dakota. The Meskwaki arrived in the 17th century, pushed west by the disturbances caused in their homelands by the French and Iroquois Wars. During this time period, the Ojibwe, Dakota and Meskwaki all competed for control of northern Wisconsin.

== The story ==
William Whipple Warren dates the Tragedy of the Siskiwit to the time between 1612 and 1671. Though centered at La Pointe on Madeline Island, the Ojibwe maintained seasonal camps along the south shore of Lake Superior. One such camp was at Siskiwit Bay near present-day Cornucopia in Bayfield County, Wisconsin. Warren calls the bay in question Kah-puk-wi-e-kah, located forty miles west of La Pointe.

The Ojibwe spring camp at the Siskiwit was attacked by the Meskwaki while Chief Bayaaswaa was away hunting. Upon his return, the chief found all the people had been killed except for his young son and an old man. The two captives were brought to the Meskwaki camp to be tortured and executed. Bayaaswaa followed the group, watched as the old man was killed and saw his son being readied to burn. The father, seeing it as the only way to save his son, offered himself in exchange. The Meskwaki, moved by the old man's actions released the son. In one version of the story, Bayaaswaa went to his death fighting and had to be taken down by several men.

The son, meanwhile, returned to the main body of Ojibwe at La Pointe and began to raise a war expedition composed of Ojibwes from bands all around Lake Superior. This large force marched against the Meskwaki, destroyed six villages and pushed the Meskwaki further inland.

== Aftermath ==
The son, after the defeat of the Meskwaki, became a respected leader and took his father's name Bayaaswaa. Bayaaswaa the younger led several wars against the Dakota that allowed the Ojibwe to move into present-day Minnesota. Among his other accomplishments was the abolition of torture among the Great Lakes tribes.

Immediately after the expedition to avenge the elder Bayaaswaa, a small part of the war party under the leadership of Waa-miigisagoo founded an Ojibwe village at Fond du Lac.

The Tragedy of the Siskiwit was a major event in the Ojibwe penetration of mainland Wisconsin. This and other conflicts between the two tribes would not end until the early 18th century, when the French supported their Native allies in two wars of extermination with the Meskwaki that drove them out of northern Wisconsin and decimated their numbers. The remaining Meskwaki forces would side with the Dakota in the Dakota-Ojibwe War. Following their catastrophic defeat at the Battle of St. Croix Falls, the Meskwaki would exit the war, seeking refuge and joining the Sauk Nation.

== Accounts ==
Knowledge of the event comes from the oral history of the Red Cliff and Bad River Ojibwe bands, and two written accounts from the 1850s. William Whipple Warren describes the tragedy in his 1851 History of the Ojibway People. In an 1859 account by German adventurer Johann Georg Kohl the author describes having the story related to him by a descendant of the men involved through the reading of birch bark scrolls. A historical marker in Cornucopia, Wisconsin commemorates the tragedy.

== See also ==
- Battle of the Brule
- Battle of Mole Lake
