= Cut Foot Sioux Lake =

Lake in the state of Minnesota, United States

- Location within Minnesota
- Location: Itasca County, Minnesota
- Coordinates: 47°31′N 94°3′W
- Type: lake

Cut Foot Sioux Lake is a lake in Itasca Countyin the U.S. state of Minnesota. It's connected to the larger Lake Winnibigoshish by the 100 foot (30 meters) wide Williams Narrows. The Cut Foot Sioux Trail takes hikers past the lake.

The lake is named for the Battle of Cut Foot Sioux (1739), a battle of the Dakota-Ojibwe War, which was fought on its shores. The battle was named for an injured Dakota Sioux warrior who was killed during the battle during the Dakota-Ojibwe War in 1739.

== See also ==
- List of lakes in Minnesota
