= Battle Creek (Minnesota) =

Coordinates: 44.9266326°N 93.0291050°W

Location
- Country: United States

Physical characteristics
- Source
  - location: Minnesota

Battle Creek is a stream in Minnesota. It rises in Battle Creek Lake in Woodbury, passing through residential Maplewood and St. Paul before emptying into the Mississippi River via Pigs Eye Lake. It is followed for much of its length by walking paths. It is the eponym for the Battle Creek neighborhood of Saint Paul.

Battle Creek was named in commemoration of the 1842 battle between Ojibwe attackers and the Dakota near the village Kaposia. The battle was part of the Dakota-Ojibwe War.

== See also ==
- List of rivers of Minnesota
