= Battle of Mole Lake =

1806 Native American battle in Wisconsin

Coordinates: 45°28′47″N 88°58′59″W

- Part of Dakota-Ojibwe War
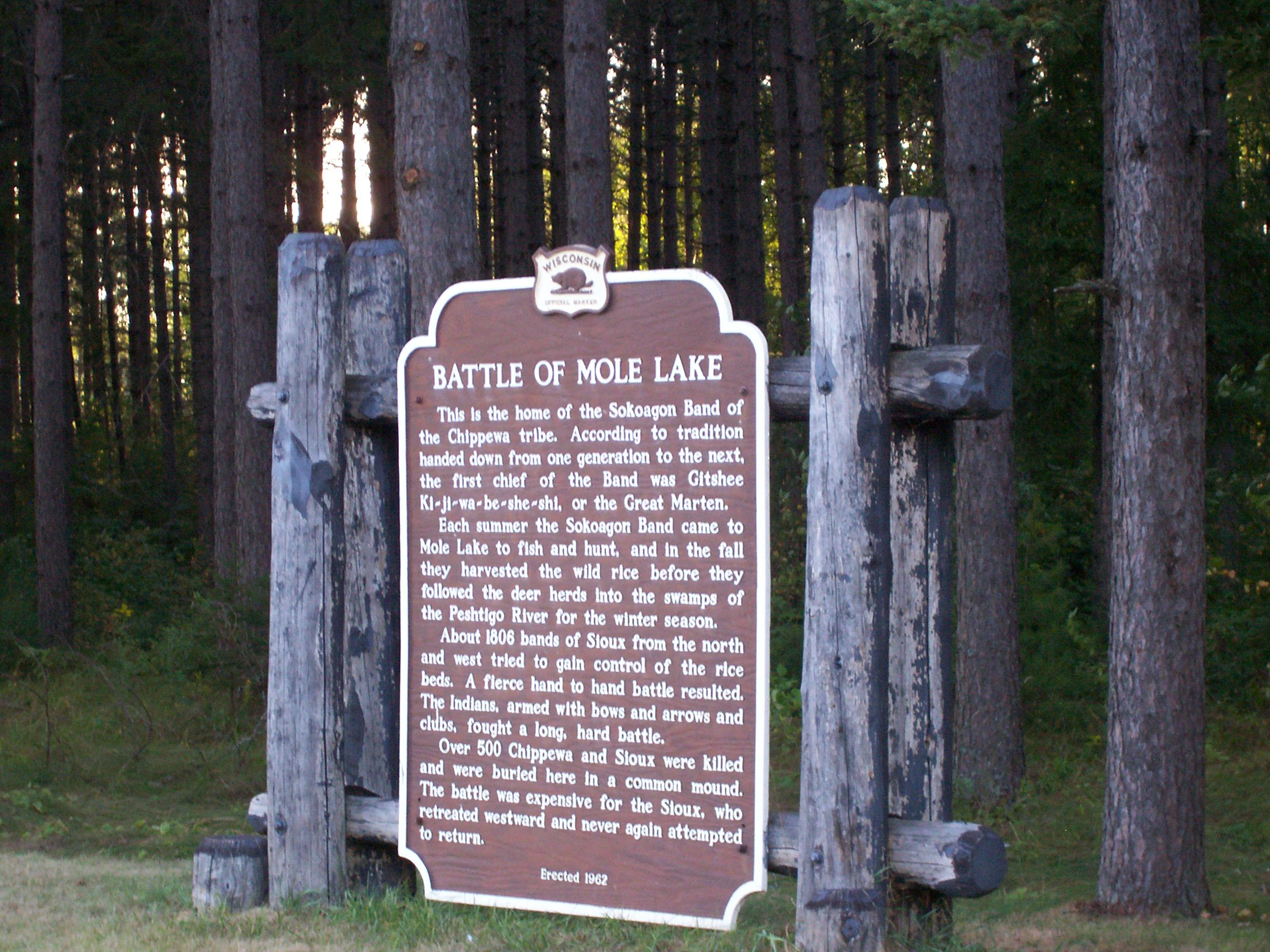
| Date | 1806 |
| Location | Forest County, Wisconsin |
| Result | Ojibwe victory |

Belligerents
| Ojibwe | Dakota |

The Battle of Mole Lake was a battle in the Dakota-Ojibwe War fought in 1806. It was fought over wild rice beds in Forest County, Wisconsin, United States. The battle occurred after Zebulon Pike's failed attempt at peace negotiations between the Dakota and Ojibwe.

About 500 people were killed in the battle, and casualties from both sides were buried together in a mound.

At the time, the area of the battle was part of the Indiana Territory.

It is possible the battle was fought earlier in the 1790s, according to Ojibwe oral history.

== See also ==
- Battle of the Brule
- Tragedy of the Siskiwit
