= Aysh-ke-bah-ke-ko-zhay =

19th century Ojibwe chief

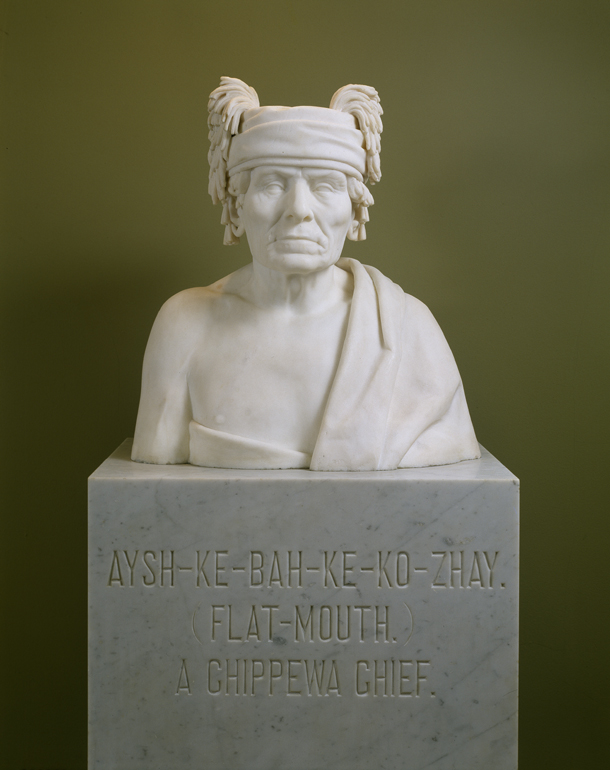
- Marble bust of Aysh-ke-bah-ke-ko-zhay in the US Senate by Francis Vincenti, 1855

Ojibwe leader
- Preceded by: Wasonaunequa

Personal details
- Born: 1774 Leech Lake
- Died: after 1862 (at least 87 years old) Leech Lake
- Children: Niganibines
- Parent: Wasonaunequa (father)
- Known for: Negotiated cession of ten million acres, including the headwaters of the Mississippi
- Nickname: "Flat Mouth" (Gueule Platte)

Aysh-ke-bah-ke-ko-zhay (or Aish-Ke-Vo-Go-Zhe, from Eshkibagikoonzhe, "[bird] having a leaf-green bill" in Anishinaabe language; also known as "Flat Mouth" (Gueule Platte), a nickname given by French fur traders (1774 – after 1862), was a powerful Ojibwe chief and diplomat during the 19th century. He was a lifelong advocate for continued Ojibwe aggression in the Dakota-Ojibwe War.

On May 28, 1827, he was visiting neutral Fort Snelling when he and his company were fired upon. He was unharmed. In 1830, he encouraged the Ojibwe to continue their attacks on the Dakota.

In 1855, he traveled to Washington, D.C. along with Beshekee and other Ojibwe leaders, to negotiate the cession of ten million acres (40,000 km^{2}) including the headwaters of the Mississippi River in northern Minnesota.

On 15 September 1862 the Chief met Governor Ramsey at the Crow Wing Agency and offered to fight the Sioux along with a number of other Chiefs during the Santee Sioux Uprising.

== Quotes ==
"We are endlessly told to bury the war hatchet, and if we dig it up we are threatened with rods and ropes, or with being placed under the ground, we the Missinabes, the Eagles, the Bears [totems], free in our own forests... Thus the Americans plan to treat us as they treat their black people...I am not an animal. I am not like those in the East whom they call their children and whom they treat like three or six-year-olds, rod in their hand. They purchased their lands, and now they hold them prisoner and treat them as slaves."

— Eshkebugecoshe, head chief of the Pillager Band of Chippewa Indians, to French geographer Joseph Nicollet in the 1830s, speaking of his people's feelings that they were losing control of their lives

Tell him I blame him for the children we have lost, for the sickness we have suffered, and for the hunger we have endured. The fault rests on his shoulders.

— Aysh-ke-bah-ke-ko-zhay, Leech Lake Band of Ojibwe speaking of Territorial Governor Alexander Ramsey
