= Beshekee =

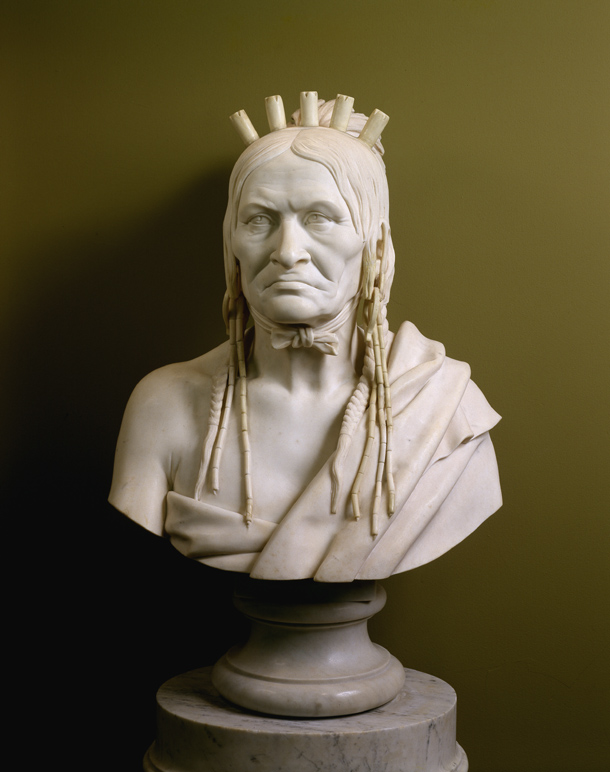
Be sheekee, or Buffalo by Francis Vincenti

Beshekee, also Pezeke and other variant spellings of Ojibwe Bizhiki (English: Buffalo), was a noted war chief from the Bear doodem of the Pillager Chippewa Band during the 19th century in North America.

As a young man, he signed the 1837 Treaty of St. Peters as Pe-zhe-kins (Bizhikiins, meaning "Young Buffalo"), a Warrior. The Pillager Band was famous for producing skilled fighters in the wars against the Dakota, and in his time, Beshekee was among the most respected of these.

In 1855, he travelled with Aysh-ke-bah-ke-ko-zhay (Flat Mouth), another prominent Pillager leader, to Washington, D.C. to address the grievances of the Mississippi Chippewa and to negotiate a cession of Ojibwe lands at the headwaters of the Mississippi River to the U.S. Government.

On 15 September 1862 the Chief meet Governor Ramsey at the Crow Wing Agency and offered to fight the Sioux along with a number of other Chiefs during the Santee Sioux Uprising.

Beshekee would later sign the 1863 Treaty that partially addressed these grievances by establishing permanent reservations in Minnesota, including one at Leech Lake.
