= Battle of the Brule =

War in 1842

- Part of Dakota-Ojibwe War
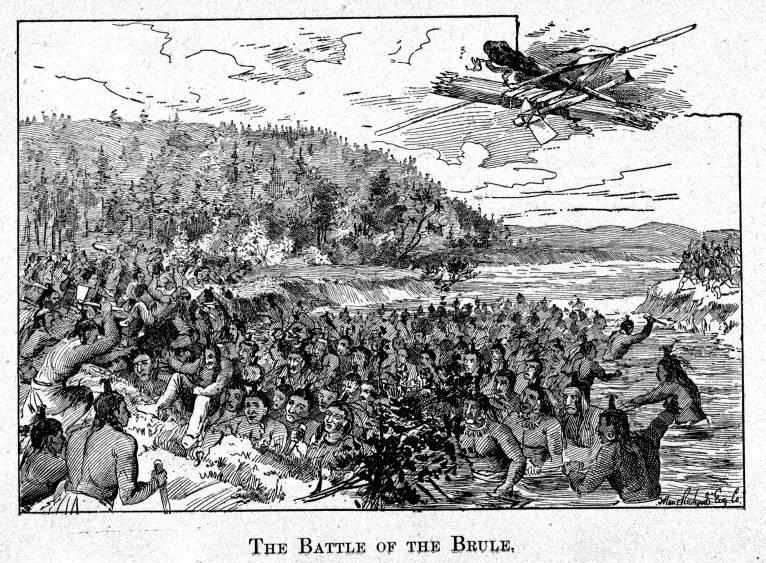
- This image of the Battle of the Brule appeared in the 1891 memoirs of Chief Buffalo's adopted son and personal interpreter Benjamin Armstrong.
Date	October 1842
Location	Bois Brule River
Result	Ojibwe victory
Territorial changes	Minnesota, United States

Belligerents
Ojibwe	Dakota

Commanders and leaders
Kechewaishke (Buffalo)	Old Crow

Casualties and losses
13	101

The Battle of the Brule was an important battle in the Dakota-Ojibwe War. It took place in October 1842 battle between the La Pointe Band of Ojibwe and a war party of Lakota. The battle took place along the Brule River (Bois Brule) in what is today northern Wisconsin and resulted in a decisive victory for the Ojibwe.

== Background ==
During the 17th and 18th centuries, control of northern Wisconsin and northeastern Minnesota was hotly contested by the Santee Dakota and the Lake Superior Chippewa (Ojibwe). By the close of the 18th century, the Dakota were largely pushed out of Wisconsin and much of northern Minnesota to areas west of the Mississippi River. In fact, the 1825 First Treaty of Prairie du Chien only recognized a small portion of present-day Wisconsin as Lakota land. However, throughout the 18th and well into the 19th centuries, the Dakota and Ojibwe continued to launch military expeditions into each other's territories.

== The Battle ==
Much of what we know about the Battle of the Brule comes from the reminiscences of Benjamin Armstrong, an eyewitness to the event. Armstrong, the adopted son of Chief Buffalo of the La Pointe Band, was an American who had decided to live with the Ojibwas on Madeline Island.

Although the Ojibwas living along Lake Superior's south shore were collectively referred to as the La Pointe Band by 19th-century sources, in actuality, they maintained seasonal camps all along the shoreline. One such camp was located at the Bois Brule River. The Dakota, under the leadership of Old Crow, hoped to take advantage of the scattered Ojibwa by leading his party against small groups by surprise while avoiding the large body of Ojibwa, La Pointe or farther to the south on the St. Croix River under Hole in the Day. Chief Buffalo of La Pointe, however, received an advance warning but not with enough time to gather his full military strength. When the groups met at the Brule, the Lakota had the advantage of numbers, but Buffalo positioned the main body of his force behind a high river bank. The Dakota, still thinking they were dealing with a very small unsuspecting group of Ojibwe fell for Buffalo's maneuver of sending out a few warriors to engage in a decoy retreat. The warriors, retreating across the Brule drew the Dakota from their bank into the river toward Buffalo on the other side. As they drew close and started climbing the bank the Ojibwa were perched behind, Buffalo had his left and right flanks pour into the river on either side to surround the Lakota. The battle soon turned into a rout as the Lakota climbing the bank were cut down as they reached the top, while those who tried to climb back down to the river met the Ojibwa below. The few surviving Dakota fled toward the direction of the Mississippi River, while Ojibwa in pursuit caught up with many and killed them. In total, the Dakota lost 101 men while the Ojibwa lost 13. Armstrong, meanwhile, recorded this all from his secure vantage point.

== Aftermath ==
Although it had more casualties than typical Dakota-Ojibwe warfare, the Battle of the Brule was an example of the type of ongoing conflict the two nations were engaged in during the 18th and early 19th centuries.

This continued warfare between the Dakota and Ojibwe figured heavily in U.S. government policy in the Wisconsin Territory. The Treaty of Prairie du Chien (1825) had been arranged with the pretext of creating peace between the two nations, and in later treaties and negotiations the government repeatedly demanded the two groups end hostilities so white settlers would see Wisconsin as a peaceful region.

Already a respected leader, the Battle of the Brule increased Chief Buffalo's prestige among all bands of Ojibwe. He was an important leader in treaty negotiations during the Treaties of La Pointe, and was the primary voice of complaint against the removal of the Lake Superior Chippewa in 1850, which resulted in the Sandy Lake Tragedy.

== See also ==
- Battle of Mole Lake
- Tragedy of the Siskiwit
