= Strawberry Island (Lac du Flambeau) =

Island in Vilas County, Wisconsin

Ojibwe: Odemin-minis
- Location of Strawberry Island within Wisconsin

Geography
- Location: Flambeau Lake
- Coordinates: 45°57′58.9″N 89°55′12″W
- Area: 26.5 acres (10.7 ha)

Administration
- United States
- State: Wisconsin
- Owner: Lac du Flambeau Band of Lake Superior Chippewa
- Strawberry Island Site
- U.S. National Register of Historic Places
- NRHP reference No.: 78000340
- Added to NRHP: 1978

Strawberry Island (Ojibwe: Odemin-minis) is an uninhabited island on Flambeau Lake, on the reservation of the Lac du Flambeau Band of Lake Superior Chippewa (Ojibwe: Waaswaaganing) in northern Wisconsin. The island is considered sacred by the local Chippewa people. In 1910 the island was sold to a non-native family, and in subsequent decades was the subject of an ownership dispute and controversy over potential development. In 2013 it was repurchased by the Lac du Flambeau tribe.

== Etymology ==
The native Ojibwe name for the island is Odemin-minis, which is translated to "Strawberry Island". According to tribal member Tina Kuckkahn, the name refers to the island's shape. Herman Bender postulates a spiritual meaning to the name, as strawberries are symbols of birth and rebirth in Anishinaabe tradition.

== Geography ==
Strawberry Island is approximately 26.5 acres (10.7 ha) in area and completely undeveloped. It is covered in mature forest consisting mainly of red pine, red oak, and big-tooth aspen. Unlike most of the surrounding area, the island was never logged. Strawberry Island contains threatened and endangered plant species as well as nesting sites for bald eagles and ospreys.

== History ==
In the early 18th century, the Chippewa of the Lake Superior region began migrating inland, towards territory inhabited by the Sioux, Sauk, and Meskwaki peoples. Lac du Flambeau was established as a major Chippewa settlement in 1745 when Chief Kishkemun led his band to the area and defeated the tribes already there.

=== Battle of 1745 ===
According to Chippewa oral tradition, Strawberry Island was the site of the final battle between the Chippewa and the Dakota in 1745. The Chippewa were victorious, and warrior dead from both sides were buried on the island. According to one oral history, the Chippewa found the Dakota on the island and defeated them, taking control. Another story relates that the Chippewa had already taken control of the island, and a Dakota war party returned for revenge, and were defeated. The actual date of this battle is uncertain.

=== Post-statehood ===
In the 19th century, Strawberry Island was used by the local Chippewa for gardening and summer residences.

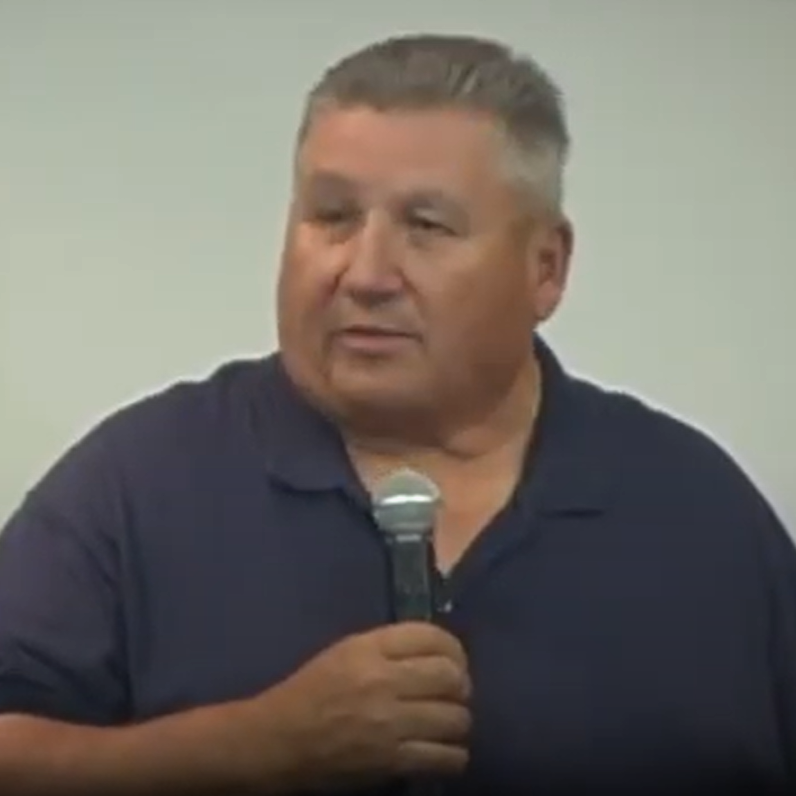
Tom Maulson was the president of the Lac du Flambeau tribe when they purchased Strawberry Island in 2013.

The Dawes Act of 1887 divided Indian reservations into individual allotments, which resulted in massive loss of tribal land. Strawberry Island was allotted to the Whitefeathers, who sold the land to the Mills family in 1910. The fact that the island had passed to a non-native family became known to the tribe in the 1960s. In 1976, Walter Mills planned to divide the island into lots and develop them into luxury vacation homes. As a result, the tribe began negotiations with the Mills family to purchase the island and prevent development. In 1994 the tribe sued to purchase the island, and Mills increased the price of the land. In 1995 Mills applied for building permits, which resulted in the tribe obtaining a preventative injunction. In 1994, the island was added to the state's "Ten Most Endangered Historic Properties" list. In July 1995, the Chippewa and Dakota organized a "Healing of the Nations Gathering" to promote protection of the island. The Vilas County Zoning Committee rejected the building permits the following year. In 2000, a tornado hit the island and knocked down many trees.

A powerful storm in summer of 2013 flattened most trees on Strawberry Island, destroying the commercially harvestable timber and making development difficult. In December 2013, the Lac du Flambeau tribe came to an agreement with the owners and purchased the island for around $250,000. The following summer, the tribe held a celebration of the purchase on a nearby beach, attended by State Senator Robert Jauch and representatives of the Bad River and Sokaogon Chippewa tribes. Since the purchase, the island has been a protected area.

== Archaeology ==
An archaeological survey conducted in 1966 by Robert Salzer found evidence of prehistoric (c. 1000 to 1400 CE) and 19th-century occupation. However, no burial sites were found during the survey. Some artifacts found on the island have been dated to as early as 300 BCE.

In the late 1970s or 1980, a 24 ft (7.3 m) dugout canoe was found in Flambeau Lake next to Strawberry Island. It contained traps, axes, shovels, and non-local white clay. It was probably deposited in the lake in the 18th or 19th century. A number of other similar canoe finds have been discovered in the Lac du Flambeau area, suggesting they were deliberate caches.

== Cultural significance ==
Strawberry Island is viewed as particularly sacred by the Lac du Flambeau Chippewa, owing to the traditional belief that it is a resting place for ancestors and Sioux warriors. It is also known as "the place of the little people", referring to spirits thought to inhabit the island. The Chippewa of the area avoid stepping foot on the island out of respect for the souls thought to be at rest there. Chippewa spirituality traditionally reveres the landscape, placing emphasis on the omnipresent Manitou (spirit). When the Chippewa initially settled in the area, they likely saw Strawberry Island as a place of importance and a dwelling for the spirit Nanabozho. Anthropologist Larry Nesper has compared Strawberry Island to the Spirit Hill of the Sokaogon Chippewa and the Black Hills of the Lakota: "the local geography has been growing more sacred over the decades as it is threatened by external forces."

Nearby Strawberry Island is Medicine Rock (Ojibwe: Gichi Mashkiki), which is also considered sacred by locals.
