= Cut Foot Sioux Trail =

Trail in Minnesota, United States

Coordinates: 47.52°N 94.07°W

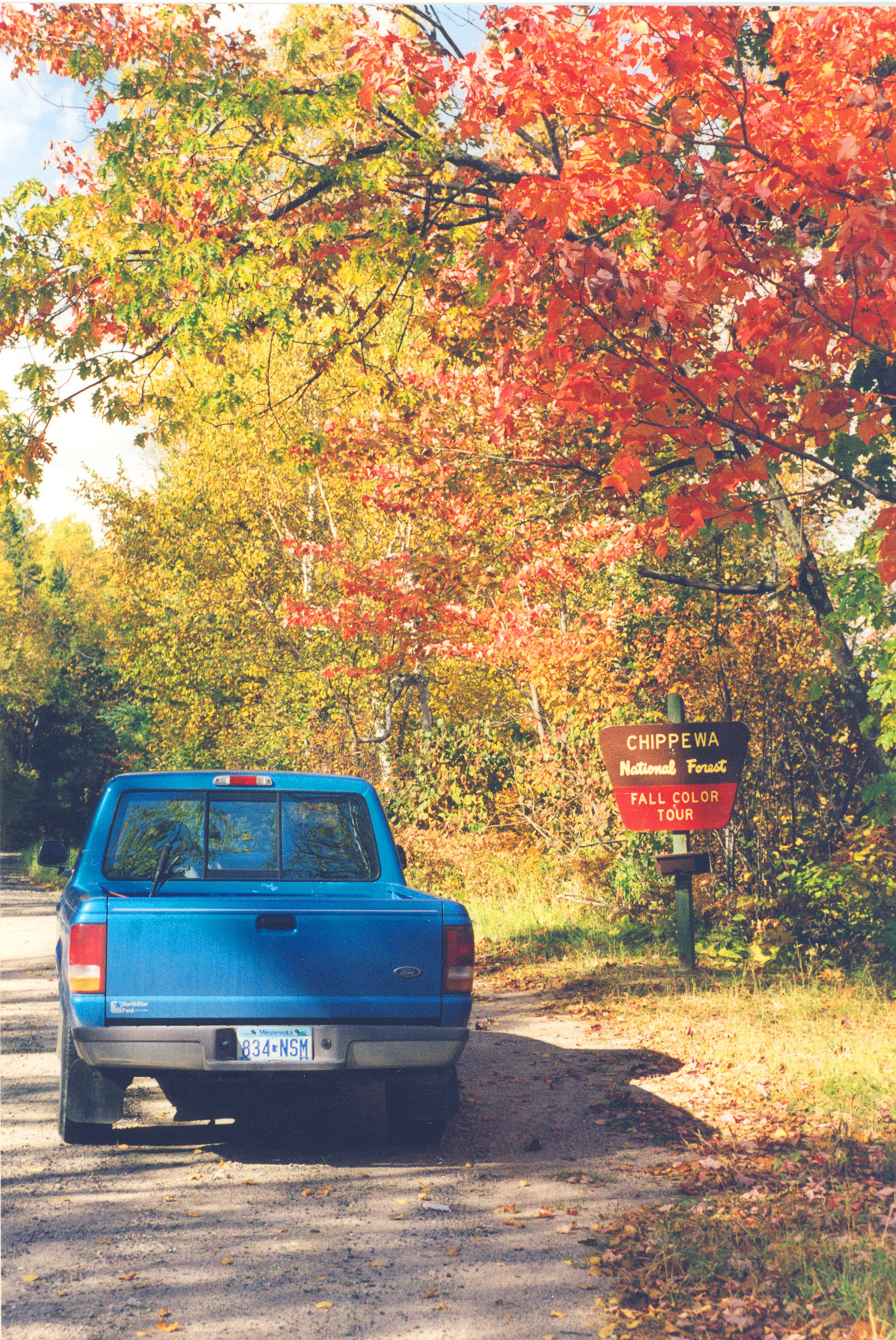
Fall Color in the Chippewa National Forest

The Cut Foot Sioux Trail is a 22-mile (35 km) loop trail in the Chippewa National Forest of Minnesota, United States. It follows gravel and sand forestry roads that are now used for hiking, biking, cross-country skiing and horse back riding. The trail passes by several lakes.

The trail starts at the Cut Foot Sioux Visitor Information Center on Minnesota State Highway 46 in west-central Itasca County. The Center, on the Leech Lake Indian Reservation, offers interpretive programs and a fishing pier. From the Center the trail runs west through wooded country past several lakes, including Cut Foot Sioux Lake, then turns north and slopes gradually up to Farley Tower, an old lookout. Turning east, the trail runs along the Northern Divide, then drops down to the Bowstring river before heading south back to the Visitor center.

The trail connects with Simpson Creek Trail, a 13-mile (21 km) trail system through large red pines on a peninsula that extends into Lake Winnibigoshish, and passes through the Cut Foot Experimental Forest, used for studying pine forest management. Walkers may see eagles, osprey and loons on the lakes.

The Cut Foot Sioux Ranger Station, near Lake Winnibigoshish, is the oldest remaining ranger station building in the Forest Service's Eastern Region. A log cabin, it was built in 1904 and abandoned in 1918, but has been restored and is in good condition as of 2008.
