= Tom Maulson =

Chippewa politician (born 1940s)

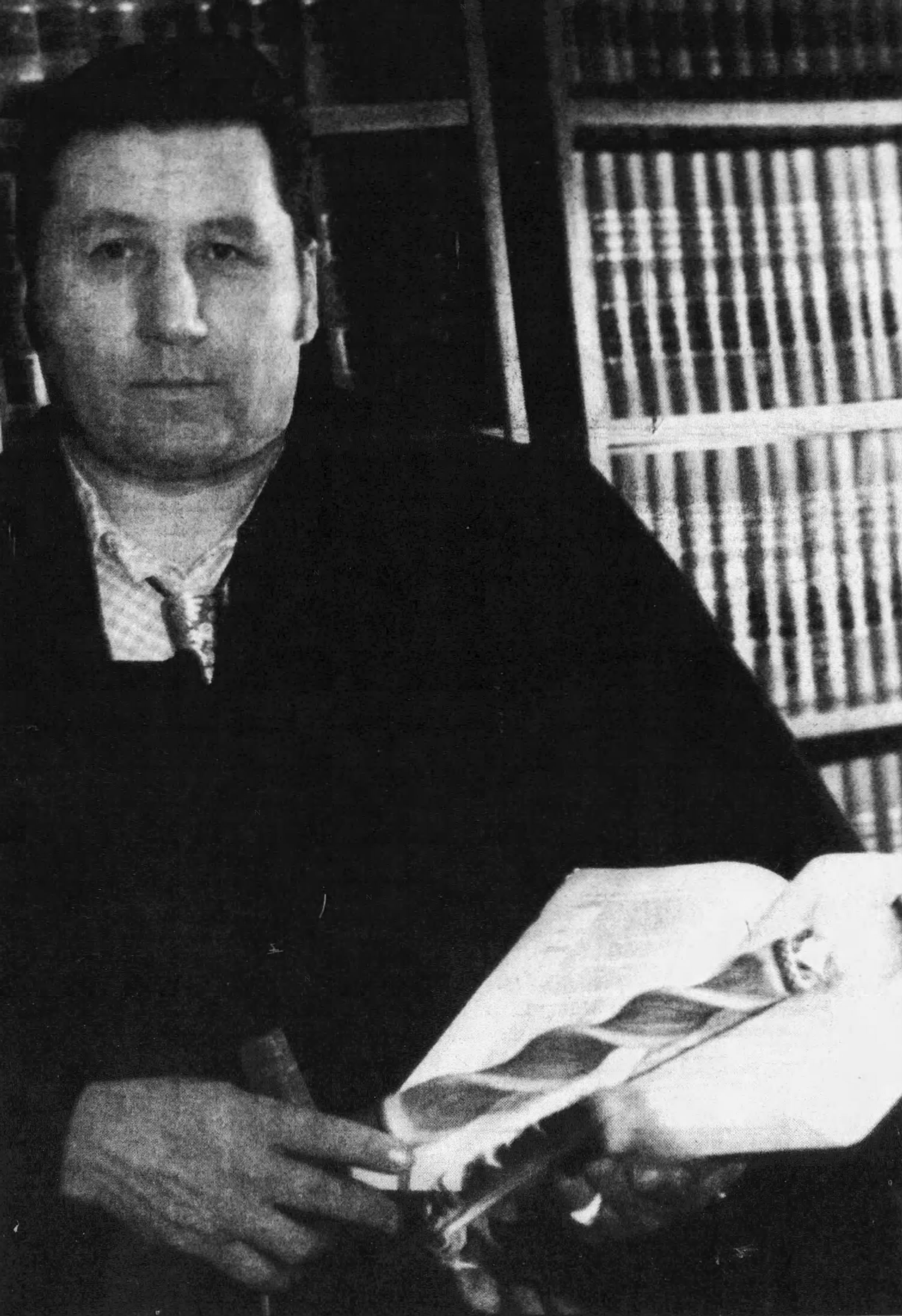
- Maulson in 1986
- Born: December 7, 1941 (age 84)
- Other name: "Walleye Warrior"
- Occupations: Activist, politician
- Known for: Wisconsin Walleye War

Tom Maulson (born December 7, 1941) is an activist and former politician of the Lac du Flambeau Band of Lake Superior Chippewa in the U.S. state of Wisconsin. He has previously served as a tribal judge, council member, and president, and was a key figure in the Wisconsin Walleye War and the tribal repurchase of Strawberry Island.

== Wisconsin Walleye War ==
Maulson served as a major activist in the Wisconsin Walleye War, a series of protests and conflicts in the 1980s and 1990s between various Ojibwe groups in Wisconsin and white sport fishers. Sport fishers and resort owners were opposed to Ojibwe rights to spearfish walleye during their spawning season, as this lowered the number of fish available during sport fishing season. Anti-Ojibwe protests often escalated to violence, with protestors regularly throwing stones and yelling slurs at Ojibwe spearfishers. Maulson served as a leader in the Ojibwe fishing rights movement, engaging in activism to protect those rights. He has stated that during that period he was "the most hated man in Wisconsin", and anti-Ojibwe protestors referred to him as "Ayatollah Maulson" for his popularity among indigenous rights activists. In 1988, Maulson's fishing boat was rammed by white boaters.

A $30,000 bounty for the murder of Maulson was put out by opponents of Ojibwe fishing rights. The Maulson home was shot at and the family dog was poisoned. Maulson's son, Fred, had rocks thrown at him by his schoolteachers. In 1990, The Washington Post referred to Maulson as one of the "major antagonists" of the Wisconsin Walleye War, alongside anti-Ojibwe protest leader Dean Crist, whom Maulson called "the Jim Jones of Minocqua". By 1991, fewer and fewer people had attended Crist's protests, and Maulson declared that the anti-Ojibwe "movement [was] over with".

== Political career ==
Maulson speaking at a symposium in 2009

In 1996, Maulson joined Elouise P. Cobell and other indigenous leaders in filing a lawsuit against the United States Department of the Interior and the United States Department of the Treasury for mismanagement of Indian trust funds. The lawsuit, Cobell v. Salazar, was settled in 2009 for $3.4 billion (equivalent to $5.1 billion in 2025).

Maulson served as a tribal judge and council member for the Lac du Flambeau Band of Lake Superior Chippewa. He also spent twelve years as tribal president and led the tribe when they reacquired Strawberry Island for $250,000 in 2013 (equivalent to $345,536 in 2025). The following summer, the tribe held a celebration of the purchase on a nearby beach, attended by State Senator Robert Jauch and representatives of the Bad River and Sokaogon Chippewa tribes. Since the purchase, the island has been a protected area.

Maulson lost the 2014 tribal primary election. In 2023, the Lac du Flambeau tribe blocked roads within their reservation over failed negotiations over right-of-way easements for the roads, and Maulson stated that the dispute created an opportunity for the town of Lac du Flambeau and the state of Wisconsin to compensate the tribe with a share of property tax revenue from the land.

== Personal life ==
Maulson's father was a white quarry worker from Berlin, Wisconsin, and his mother was an Ojibwe woman. He has a son named Fred Maulson and grandchildren.

Maulson is no longer able to spearfish due to his age. At the 2024 Youth Fishing Day, a yearly event held to teach tribal youth traditional fishing methods, Maulson stated that such efforts are important in order to retain cultural traditions.
