= Dakota–Ojibwe War =

18th–19th century war in North America

Date	1736/9 – May 27, 1858
Location	Minnesota, Wisconsin
Result	Inconclusive

Belligerents
Dakota; Meskwaki (to 1770)	Ojibwe; Supported by: Kingdom of France (to 1763); Tecumseh's Confederacy (1810–1813)

Commanders and leaders
Chief Cloud Man; Chief Noonday †; Chief Old Crow; Red Bird †; Chief Shakopee I; Chief Tatankamani; Chief Wapasha II	Chief Aysh-ke-bah-ke-ko-zhay; Chief Ay Ash Wash; Augenosh; Chief Bayaaswaa I; Chief Bayaaswaa II; Grand Chief Kagegameg; Chief Kechewaishke (Buffalo); Chief Hole in the Day; Chief 'Premier' Nittum; Chief Wau-ma-nuag; Chief Na-Non-Gabe †; Chief Naw-Gaw-Nub; Chief Uke-ke-waus †; Chief Waub-o-jeeg

The Dakota–Ojibwe War was fought between the Dakota and Ojibwe from the late 1730s to 1858. The war happened mostly within the borders of what is now Minnesota and Wisconsin. Neither side would claim victory in the war.

== Background ==
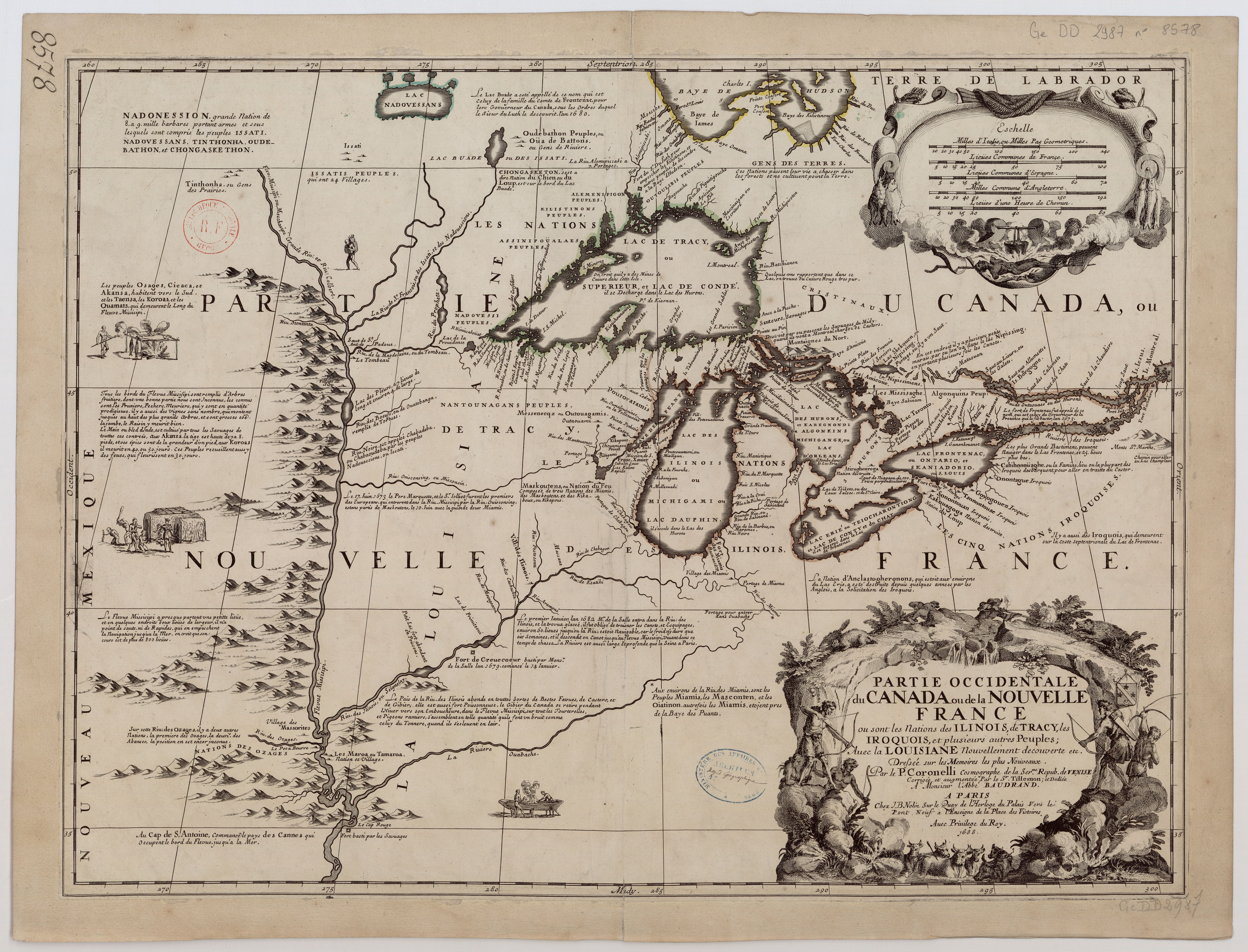
A 1688 French map of the region

The Ojibwe began in the 6th century on the Atlantic coast, and slowly moved inland over centuries. By around 1500 the Ojibwe first entered Lake Superior. The Ojibwe of the 16th century were native to the eastern great lakes, such as Lake Erie and Lake Huron, and became displaced during the Beaver Wars by the Iroquois Confederacy. The Ojibwe began to settle on modern-day northern Wisconsin, which was Dakota land.

Periods of peace and conflict between the Dakota and Ojibwe would be established and ended, usually on local scales. In 1679, the Dakota and Ojibwe formed an alliance. The Dakota and Ojibway met at present-day Duluth, and it was agreed the Ojibwe could make use of the Dakota's coastal lands along Lake Superior in exchange for shared economic ties with the French.

In 1717, war began between the Assiniboine, Cree, and the Dakota-Ojibwe Alliance. The Assiniboine and Cree convinced the French to begin sending more explorers and soldiers into the region of Lake Superior by spreading false rumors of a Northwest Passage connected to the lake. This was done in the hopes of being able to easily drag the French into the war on their side. French explorer La Vérendrye would be sent to explore the region in 1731, and urged the French to established good relations with both sides. This was done in the form of the French freely selling weapons to both sides of the war. In 1734, the Cree argued that by establishing permanent trade relations with them, it was now the obligation of the French to aid them in their war. The French agreed to side with them, which caused a great regional disruption in the fur trade.

== Breakdown of the alliance ==
The exact breaking point in the alliance is not known. There are two known incidents in which the alliance was broken.

According to one account, the alliance broke in 1736, when the Dakota began to ignore the Ojibwe's concerns, citing that technically, the Ojibwe were guests in the land and the Dakota were the actual owners of the land. The Ojibwe refused this, arguing that the land had long since become theirs as they had lived there for three generations, resulting in the Ojibwe breaking with the Dakota to fight to protect the lands they were now living on from Dakota claims.

According to one account, the alliance broke following the Lake of the Woods massacre, in which the son of Pierre de La Vérendrye, Jean Baptiste de La Vérendrye, was killed in a battle near Rainy Lake between a coalition of French, Cree, and Assiniboine forces against an alliance of the Dakota and Ojibwe. The French held the Dakota solely responsible, with La Vérendrye declaring "Rub these people out, and wipe them off the face of the Earth!" The Ojibwe chose to break their alliance with the Dakota to preserve their economic relations with France.

The land disputes beginning in 1736 may have been the breaking of the alliance whereas actual military action did not begin until after the incident at Rainy Lake in 1739. It is disputed which event should be counted as the beginning of the war, as there are no known records supporting if hostilities occurred in the time between the two incidents or not.

== Eighteenth century ==
Dakota and Ojibwe relations continued to deteriorate over the following decades, with notable battles being fought at Big Sandy Lake (1744), Mille Lacs (1745), on the St. Croix River (1755), Leech Lake (1760), and Red Lake (1770). The Battle of Mille Lacs solidified Ojibwe dominance over the Forested areas of what would be Minnesota. Ojibwe oral history makes mention of a 1750 Battle of Kathio, however this is no historical evidence of this battle.

In about 1748, the Battle of Cut Foot Sioux occurred at what would later be named Cut Foot Sioux Lake. This battle was one of the last battles fought in Minnesota's forests, and saw the few Dakota who remained in the region following their defeat at Mille Lacs in 1745 retreat to the west.

=== Battle of St. Croix Falls ===
In 1770, the Ojibwe, led by the young Chief Waub-o-jeeg, met the Dakota and their allies, the Meskwaki, in the battle of St. Croix Falls (also called the Battle of the Dalles). The Ojibwe had been using the area as hunting grounds, however the Dakota and Meskwaki had been reasserting control over the region in recent years. In early summer, Waub-o-jeeg and 300 Ojibwe warriors assembled at La Pointe to head south to St. Croix Falls. A total of 60 more Ojibwe joined them on the way. The journey took seven days. The Ojibwe became spread out, and arrived slowly. Meskwaki warriors sighted the Ojibwe first, and opened fire, believing as only seven Ojibwe warriors had arrived. Chief Waub-o-jeeg arrived shortly after fighting began. Hand-to-hand combat began after both sides attempted to cross the river. As the Meskwaki warriors began to retreat, superior numbers of Dakota warriors arrived to aid them. At the same time, the Ojibwe ran out of ammunition. The battle was at a stalemate until Ojibwe reinforcements from Sand Lake arrived, numbering 60.

The battle resulted in the Meskwaki (already weak from multiple wars with the French) to be forced to exit the war and unite with the neutral Sauk, to the south.

=== Brief peace ===
Combined with improving economic conditions due to increasing trade with European powers, the Dakota and Ojibwe improved their relations over the 1770s. Around this time, Chief Ay Ash Wash attended a peace ceremony with the intention of ending the war. The peace ceremony did not succeed in permanently ending the conflict.

In the Seven Years' War, the Ojibwe sided with the French. Following a British victory, and the American Revolution, the Ojibwe then preferred to side with the British against the Americans.

=== Treaty of 1787 ===
From 1780 to 1782, a smallpox epidemic hit the Ojibwe. Partially because of this, in July 1787, a peace treaty was established. Chief Nittum, one of the most important and influential Ojibwe leaders (who had also adopted the title of 'Premier'), was one of the leaders in the peace effort. The peace would be broken on October 14, 1794, when Premier Nittum's son, Grand Chief Kagegameg, restarted attacks on the Dakota.

=== Battle of Battle Lake ===
In 1795, the Battle of Battle Lake occurred. Ojibwe Chief Uke-ke-waus led a 50-man surprise attack on the Dakota. Uke-ke-waus and his three sons were killed in the battle. The Ojibwe would be defeated, with two-thirds of their company killed. The Ojibwe would come to call the lake Ish-quon-e-de-win-ing, meaning 'Where But Few Survived'. The battle was later documented by William Whipple Warren. One of the few survivors, Wenonga, now has a statue near the shore of the lake.

=== Battle of the Horsefly ===
The Battle of the Horsefly, also known as the Battle of Teal River, took place in about 1795 in Sawyer County. The Ojibwe village of Pukwaywong ('Old Post' in English) received reports that there were Dakota warriors canoeing up the West Fork Chippewa River along which the village was built. The civilians were evacuated, and the Ojibwe warriors dug Foxholes along the riverbanks. Once the Dakota warriors began to reach the Ojibwe defenses, the Ojibwe opened fire, followed by showers of arrows. The Dakota landed on either side of the river, resorting to hand-to-hand combat. All of the Dakota but one were killed. Two burials, one for the Dakota and one for the Ojibwe, would be made. A white settler would plant trees over the burial site to ensure it would never be farmed. The single surviving Dakota was sent back down the river, with food, and a message not to attack again. The Dakota would never attack this area again.

It has also been recorded as having taken place in fall of 1790, however this date is not verifiable and takes place during the peace established by Chief Nittum.

== Nineteenth century ==
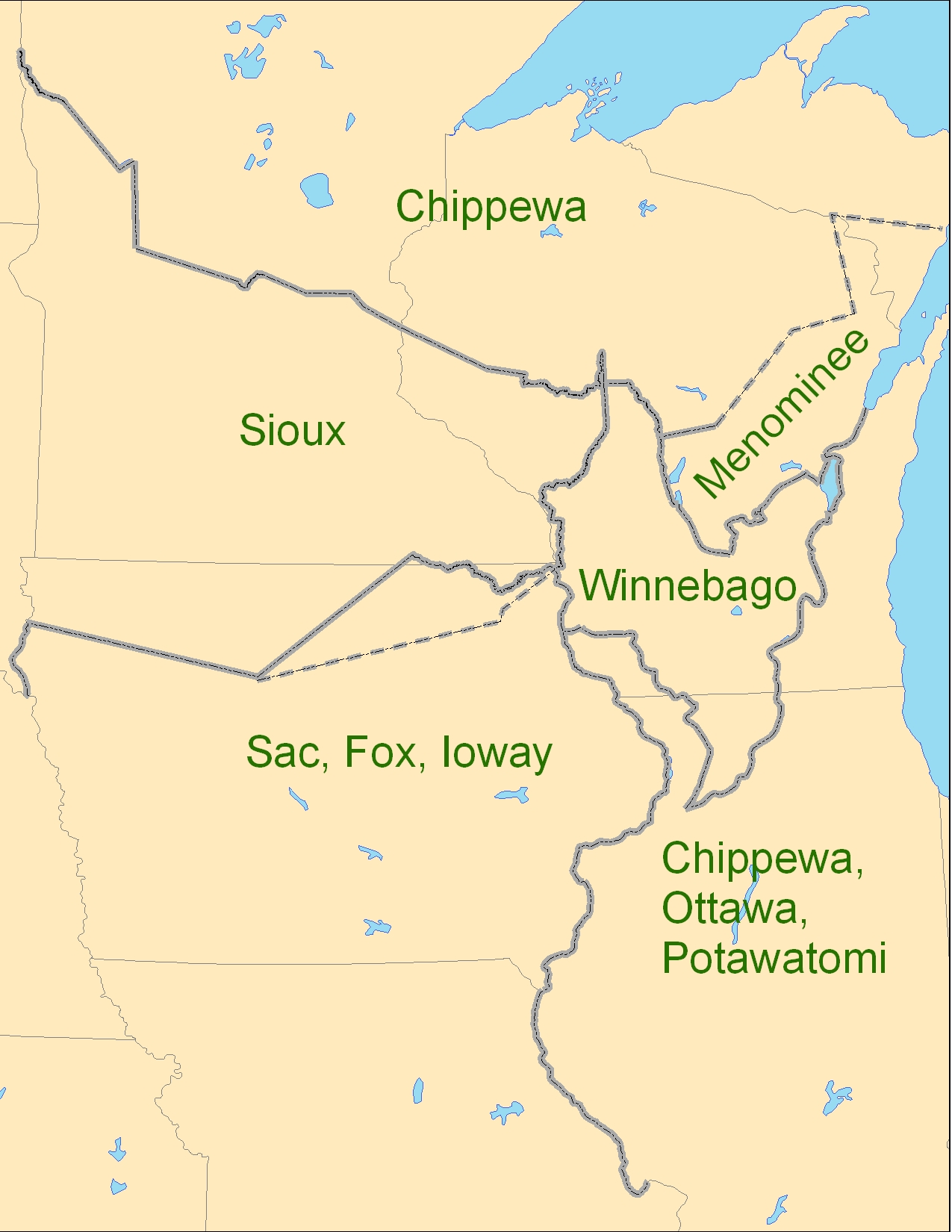
Treaty of Prairie du Chien Borders

In 1805–1806, an expedition led by Zebulon Pike attempted to undermine British relations with the Ojibwe and end their war with the Dakota. This was unsuccessful, and the Battle of Mole Lake occurred afterwards. The Ojibwe would then side with Tecumseh's Confederacy against the Americans in the War of 1812. The Dakota did not participate, leading to resentment in the Ojibwe following their defeat by the American army.

In 1825, the American government tried again to end hostilities between the tribes, in the First Treaty of Prairie du Chien. The treaty specified an agreed upon border between the two sides, along with other borders in the area. Despite progress towards agreed borders, Ojibwe attacks on the Dakota persisted.

On May 28, 1827, an incident took place at Fort Snelling. Ojibwe chief Aysh-ke-bah-ke-ko-zhay was visiting Fort Snelling when he and those with him were fired upon by Dakota forces. One bullet flew near the head of the American Captain Cruger. When the violence was ended, Ojibwe warrior Strong Earth demanded justice for the attack. The American Major Clark was ordered to go to the nearest Dakota village and capture as many Dakota as could be taken. Thirty Dakota warriors were taken prisoner. They were then set loose in an open plain, so that the surviving Ojibwe were free to shoot as many as they could. Two Dakota were killed, the other twenty-eight survived. This incident led to outrage from the Dakota, believing the United States could be choosing a side. Fort Commander Josiah Snelling continued to insist on neutrality.

In 1830, Chief Aysh-ke-bah-ke-ko-zhay encouraged the Ojibwe to continue their attacks on the Dakota.

In April 1838, Dakota from Ḣeyate Otuŋwe were attacked and killed by Ojibwe part of Hole in the Day's band. After multiple retaliations, Hole in the Day met with Ḣeyate Otuŋwe's chief, Cloud Man, at Fort Snelling to discuss peace in June 1839. A truce was called, only to be broken by the Ojibwe, killing Cloud Man's son, two days later. A force of about 150 warriors was assembled by Red Bird, head soldier for the local Dakota. Red Bird's army met the Ojibwe at the Rum River on July 3. The Dakota would be victorious, however Red Bird and his son were killed. A month of celebrations followed. Missionary Gideon Pond would describe the events as "It seemed hell had emptied itself here" In 1839, Ḣeyate Otuŋwe was abandoned for multiple reasons, including fear of retaliation by the Ojibwe. They would relocated further south, and founded the village of Oak Grove, built near the Dakota village Titanka Tannina, whose chief was the allied Good Road.

=== Battle of Battle Creek ===
In 1842, two Dakota women were farming in present-day St.Paul near Pig's Eye Lake when they were fired upon and killed by an Ojibwe attack, led by a man named Augenosh. Dakota warriors from the nearby village of Kaposia quickly responded. The Ojibwe force of about 100 was quickly in combat. After about two hours of fighting, the Ojibwe retreated further north. The fighting happened in the ravine of what is now called Battle Creek. The Dakota would be the victors, pushing Augenosh's forces north, near to Stillwater. American forces would be sent to put a stop to the battle, setting off from Fort Snelling, however did not arrive until after the Battle was over. The Battle would become known as the Battle of Battle Creek. It is also known by some historians as the Battle of Kaposia, despite the battle taking place away from Kaposia itself.

=== Battle of the Brule ===
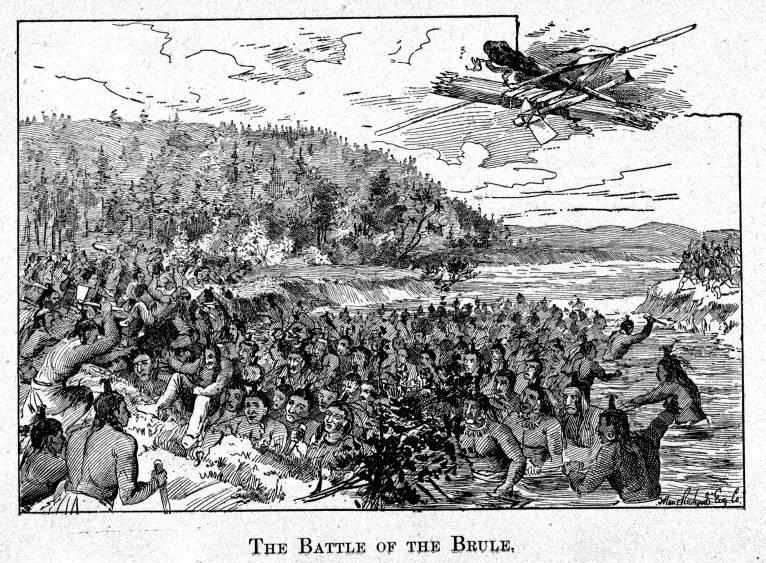
Battle of the Brule

Later that year, the Battle of the Brule happened. The Dakota attempted to push the Ojibwe back further north. The Dakota, led by Old Crow, hoped to take advantage of the Ojibwe's smaller numbers. The Ojibwe, led by Chief Buffalo of La Pointe, were able to take advantage of the Dakota's confidence by sending a decoy unit of warriors, resulting in the Dakota splitting up their army and being defeated.

=== 1847 Treaty of Fond du Lac ===
In 1847, the 1847 Treaty of Fond du Lac was signed between the Ojibwe and United States, with the intention of separating the Dakota and Ojibwe by a corridor of settled land, populated by white settlers in some regions, and a large section for the Ho-Chunk. The Ho-Chunk would never settle the region.

=== Battle of Rice Lake ===
In fall 1855, Ojibwe Chief Na-Non-Gabe and his company was attacked near Prairie Home. Chief Na-Non-Gabe signaled for the Ojibwe to retreat. He was killed in the battle. The Dakota would be victorious, however would be unable to continue controlling the land due to increased white settlement.

=== Battle of Shakopee ===
The Battle of Shakopee would be the final battle in the war. By this time the area was already settled by white immigrants. The battle was viewed from afar by white reporters. The battle was not fought in the city itself, but nearby on the shore of the Minnesota River.

On the morning of the 26th of May, 1858, 150-200 Ojibwe warriors arrived on the north shore of the Minnesota River. The following morning, they began their attack on the Dakota by firing upon a Dakota man fishing in the river. Forty to Fifty Dakota responded to the gunfire and arrived to their side of the river. Fire would be continued to be exchanged across the river until about 10:00 AM, when the Ojibwe retreated to Lake Minnetonka.

The Dakota would prepare for a second attack, which would not come. Governor Henry Sibley would order the Dakota to return to reservation land.

== Aftermath ==
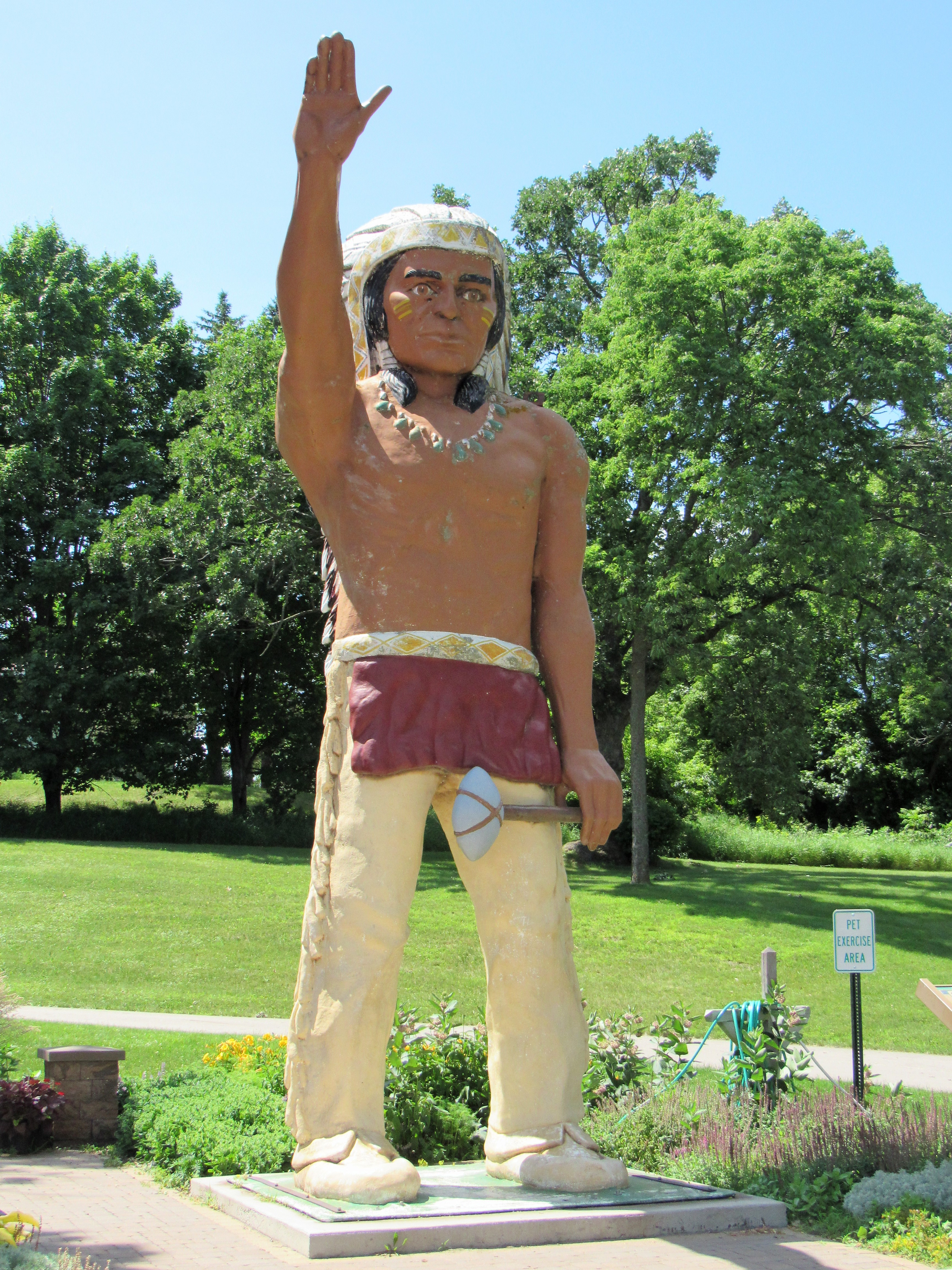
Statue of Wenonga

Neither side would claim victory in the war, as white American settlement quickly overtook in importance and threat the disputes between the two tribes. After the Battle of Shakopee, the Dakota and Ojibwe were separated by white settlers, and reservation borders were enforced by the United States Military. It was then impossible for either side to attempt an attack on each other.

=== Dakota War of 1862 ===
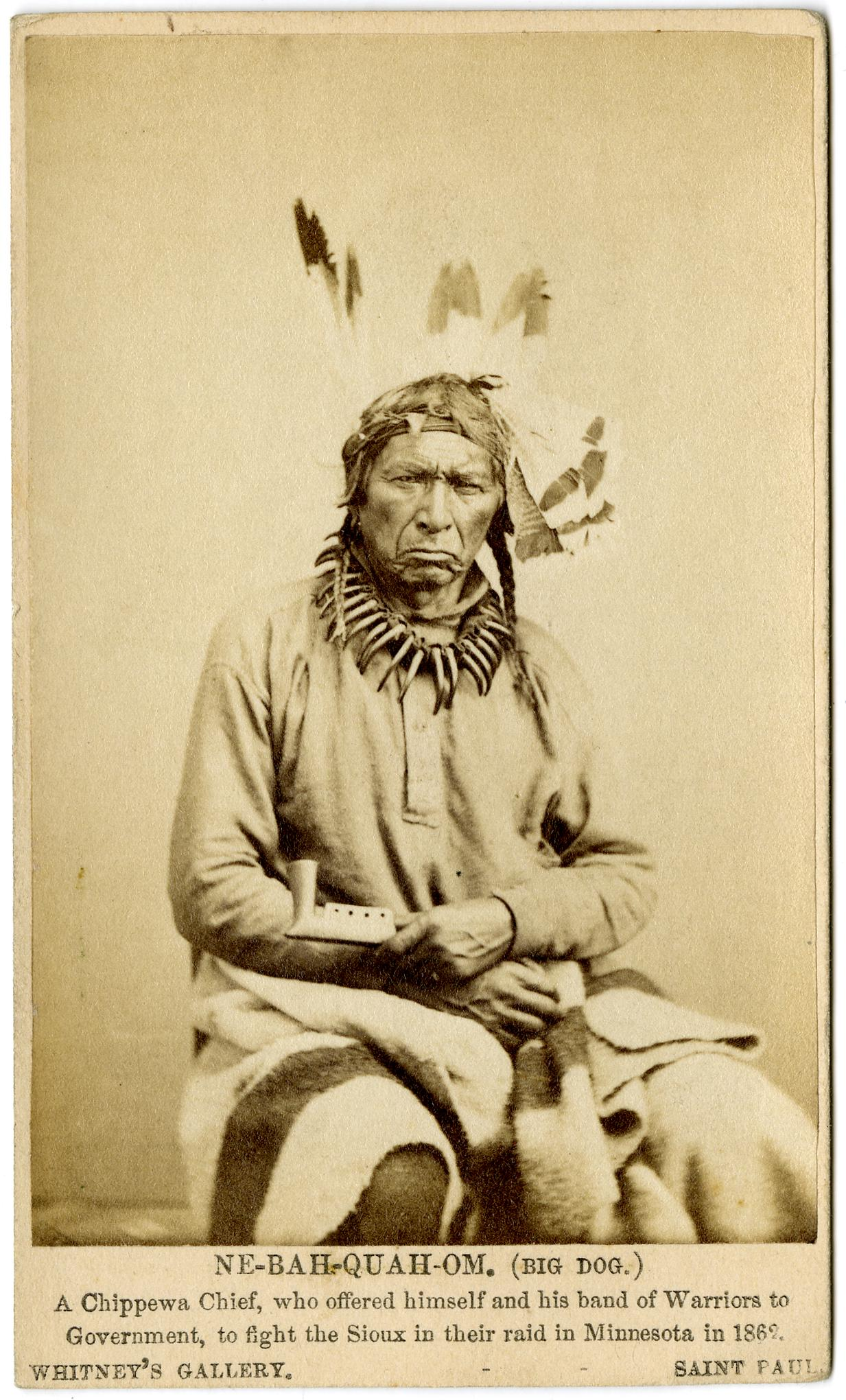
Chief Naw-Gaw-Nub

In the Dakota War of 1862, a group of Ojibwe volunteers fought against the Dakota on behalf of the United States, as many Ojibwe continued to consider the Dakota enemies. Chiefs Naw-Gaw-Nub (also spelled 'Ne-Bah-Quah-Om') and Shin-Gwack sent a letter to Minnesota Governor Alexander Ramsey on September 2, 1862, asking for permission to fight the Dakota. This offer was accepted. However, the Ojibwe never saw any actual conflict as the war ended on September 26.

=== Modern times ===
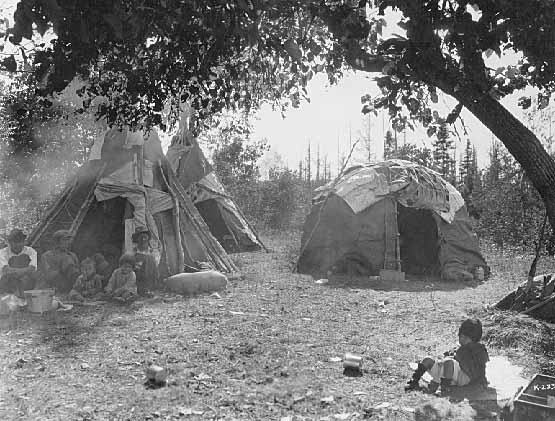
Ojibwe and Dakota Co-existence, White Earth, 1928

Both Dakota and Ojibwe reservations still exist in Minnesota today. No Dakota reservations exist in Wisconsin, but there are Ojibwe reservations. Despite being an Ojibwe reservation, both Dakota and Ojibwe would be relocated to the White Earth Indian Reservation. This continued until 1898.

There is no longer any hostility between the two sides. Oral history from both sides blames the French for destabilizing the region and breaking the peace.
