= Bayaaswaa I =

Bayaaswaa I (Note: Aan'aawenh (Pintail Duck) doodem) was an Ojibwe Chief of a village on the south shore of Lake Superior, located about 40 miles west of La Pointe, Wisconsin, in the late 17th century.

According to William Whipple Warren, based on oral history, he was known for his prowess and wise counsel. His time as chief coincided with the ongoing Dakota-Ojibwe War. One day, Bayaaswaa returned from a day's hunting, he found his villagers massacred by the Meskwaki, also known as the Fox. Bayaaswaa tracked the Meskwaki, finding that they had taken two captives: an old man that was tortured to death and his son, Bayaaswaa II, who was going to be tortured. Warren then states:

As Biauswah looked upon the scene from his hiding-place he recognized in the lad his own son. His heart was filled with strong affection for the youth, and knowing how helpless he was to rescue him single-handed, he stepped forth from his place of safety as the Indians were about to light the faggots. Much to the amazement of his enemies he bravely strode among them, until he stood near the lad, and then addressing them, said, "My little son, whom you are about to burn with fire, has seen but a few winters; his tender feet have never trodden the warpath, he has never injured you. But the hairs of my head are white with many winters, and over the graves of my relatives I have hung many scalps, which I have taken from the heads of the Foxes. My death is worth something to you. Let me, therefore, take the place of my child, that he may return to his people". His enemies listened in astonishment, and having long desired his death, accepted his proposal. They allowed the young lad to return to his people, and the father was burned in his stead. A terrible revenge was meted out to the Foxes when the lad told his sad tale, for a large war party fell upon the Foxes, destroying so many of them that the remainder left the district and made their home in Wisconsin.
