= Bayaaswaa II =

Chief of Sandy Lake Ojibwe

Bayaaswaa II (Note: also spelled Biauswah, Bajasswa, Byianswa or Biaswah) was the principal Chief of the Sandy Lake Ojibwe, whose village was located at either terminus of the Savanna Portage (Sandy Lake & opposite the mouth of the East Savanna River) in Minnesota.

According to William Whipple Warren, based on oral history, as Bayaaswaa was captured by the Meskwaki as a child, and his father Bayaaswaa I traded his life for his son's. Bayaaswaa and few other survivors went to Fond du Lac, and the Fond du Lac Band drove the Fox out of northern Wisconsin.

Bayaaswaa was a leading figure in the Dakota-Ojibwe War, participating a major battle with the Dakota at the mouth of the Crow Wing River. Sixty Ojibwe led by Bayaaswaa engaged three hundred Dakota who they said had destroyed their village at Sandy Lake. Supposedly, the battle lasted for three days. The Ojibwe established their village at Sandy Lake, establishing the Sandy Lake Band, and then ventured to Red Lake and Pembina. Other oral history accounts, however, suggest the Cree aided the Ojibwe against the Dakota. According to Richard Alan Nelson, Bayaaswaa was a Midewiwin and lived to the age of 109.

Bayaaswaa's son Gaa-dawaabide ("Broken Tooth") succeeded him as Chief of the Sandy Lake Band.

Biauswah Lake in Itasca County, Minnesota, is named after him, as is the Biauswah Bridge, a bridge for the MN 23 over the Saint Louis River near Duluth.
