= Lake Winnibigoshish =

Lake in Minnesota, U.S.

- Wiinibiigoonzhish-zaaga'igan (Ojibwe)
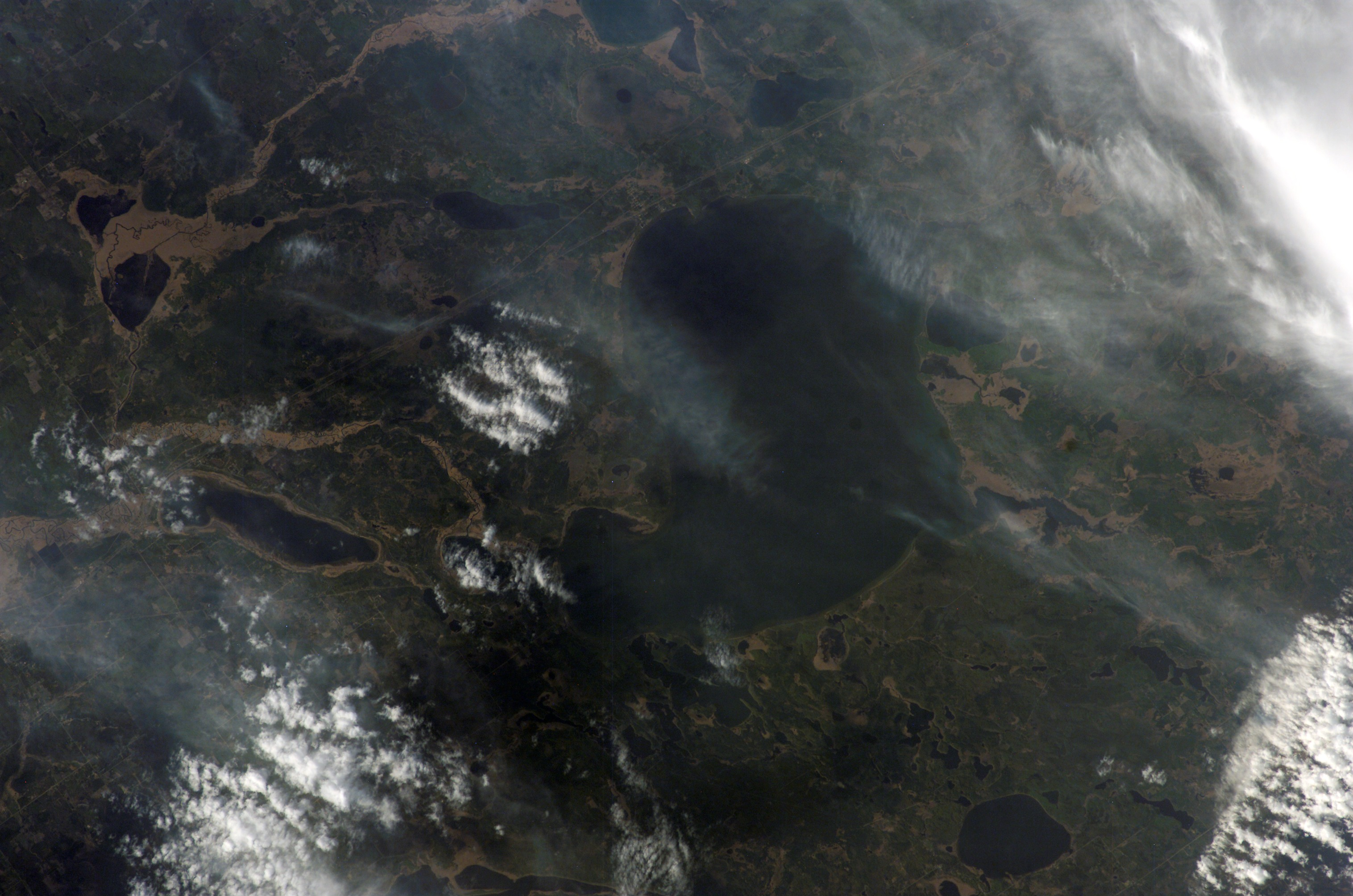
- Lake Winnibigoshish (center), as viewed from space

- Location within Minnesota Location within the United States
- Location: Leech Lake Indian Reservation, Cass / Itasca counties, Minnesota, United States
- Coordinates: 47.45°N 94.18°W
- Type: Reservoir
- Primary inflows: Mississippi River
- Primary outflows: Mississippi River
- Basin countries: United States
- Surface area: 56,471.4 acres (22,853.2 ha)
- Max. depth: 69.8 ft (21.3 m)

Lake Winnibigoshish is a body of water in north central Minnesota in the Chippewa National Forest. Its name comes from the Ojibwe language Wiinibiigoonzhish, a diminutive and pejorative form of Wiinibiig, meaning "filthy water" (i.e., "brackish water"). The name is related in structure to Lake Winnipeg and to the Algonquian name for Lake Winnebago, which the Ho-chunk (Winnebago) Nation was named after.

The Lake's area of 67,000 acres makes it the fourth largest in Minnesota. The headwaters of the Mississippi River begin at Lake Itasca (see Mississippi River Basin map); where it flows through Winnibigoshish, the Mississippi is at its widest - more than 11 miles.

The former Winnibigoshish Township (now unorganized), located on the north shore of Lake Winnibigoshish, in Itasca County, Minnesota, was named after this lake.
