= Ottawa (tug) =

Tugboat that sank in Lake Superior

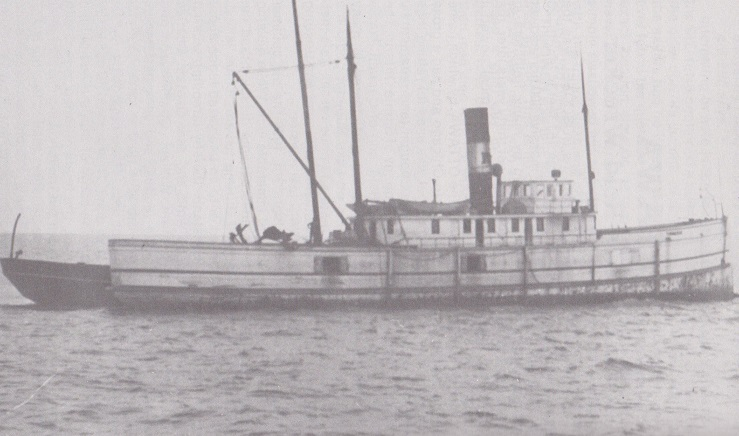
- The Ottawa

History
- Name: Ottawa
- Owner: Reid Wrecking Company, of Sarnia, Ontario (last owners)
- Port of registry: United States
- Builder: Built in 1881 at Chicago
- Laid down: November 13, 1909
- Launched: 1881
- Fate: Burned and sank 29 November 1909
- Notes: Wreck located between Basswood Island and the Bayfield Peninsula; Added to the National Register of Historic Places in 1992

General characteristics
- Type: Tugboat
- Tonnage: 610.8 gross tons
- Length: 151 feet (46 m)
- Beam: 28 ft (8.5 m)
- Depth of hold: 13 feet
- Installed power: 600 horsepower engine
- Notes: Originally named the Boscobel, renamed Ottawa when sold.
- Ottawa (Tug) Shipwreck Site
- U.S. National Register of Historic Places
- Location: Russell, Wisconsin
- Nearest city: Red Cliff, Wisconsin
- Coordinates: 46°52′59.7″N 90°45′49.2″W
- MPS: Great Lakes Shipwreck Sites of Wisconsin MPS
- NRHP reference No.: 92000594
- Added to NRHP: June 8, 1992

The Ottawa was a tugboat that sank in Lake Superior off the coast of Red Cliff in Russell, Bayfield County, Wisconsin. The wreckage site was added to the National Register of Historic Places in 1992.

== History ==
Ottawa, originally named Boscobel, was built in Chicago, Illinois. It was the largest tug ever built in Chicago at the time and remained the largest and most powerful tug on the Great Lakes until its sinking in 1909.

Originally the boat was used for rafting logs on Lake Michigan, but in 1901 was bought (and renamed) by the Reid Wrecking Company, based in Sarnia, Ontario.

On November 13, 1909, a steamboat passing the Apostle Islands became stranded on a shoal two miles off of Outer Island during a storm. The ship's first mate and other members of the crew launched the lifeboat and went to land in order to get help. Four vessels tried for a week to aid the steamboat. Eventually, three more vessels, including Ottawa, were dispatched to the scene. On November 29, they were finally able to free the steamboat. That evening, the Ottawa's crew ate dinner and retired to bed. Less than 30 minutes later, they were woken by a fire that was already out of control. Ottawa was pushed away from the steamboat that they had earlier rescued by the other vessels in efforts to stop the spread of fire and another tugboat was sent to help Ottawa. Despite the efforts, Ottawa burned to the waterline and sank. All crew members were saved.

The cause of the fire remains unknown. Theories include that the fire was a result of spontaneous combustion in the ship's coal bunkers, which contained 130 tons of fuel.

== See also ==
- Apostle Islands
- List of shipwrecks in the Great Lakes
