= Frank Koehn =

American politician from Wisconsin

- Occupation: Politician
- Known for: First Green Party candidate to be elected to office in the United States

Francis K. (Frank) Koehn is an American activist and politician in Northern Wisconsin. He became the first Green Party candidate to be elected to office in the United States when he won a seat as Bayfield County supervisor on the Lake Superior Greens ticket in 1986. Koehn's 12 years on the Board of Supervisors (1986–1998) is one of the longest tenures in elected office for any Green Party member, and after Dave Conley (22 years) is the second longest among Wisconsin Greens. Koehn has also been active in environmental, treaty rights and human rights causes including opposition to the Crandon and White Pine mines, support of Ojibwe treaty rights, and support for the proposed Seventh-Generation Amendment to the US Constitution. Koehn has paid particular efforts to preserving Lake Superior. Koehn collaborated closely with Walter Bresette on many of these initiatives. He is recognized as a founding member of the Wisconsin Green Party and remains actively involved. Koehn worked as a schoolteacher in the South Shore Schools in Port Wing, Wisconsin, until recently. He currently lives in Herbster, Wisconsin.

== See also ==
- Wisconsin Walleye War
