= Walter Bresette =

American politician

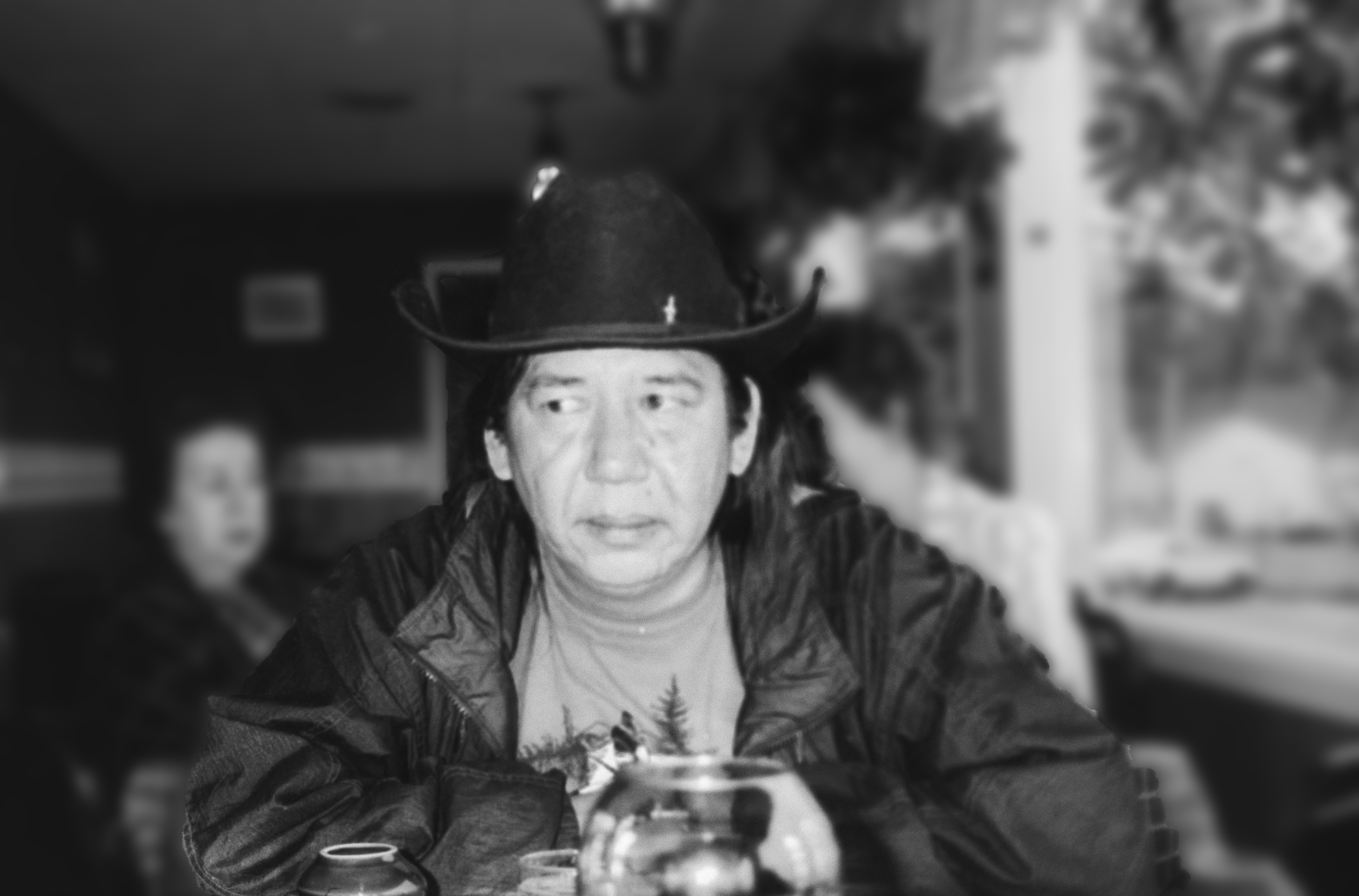
Walt Bresette

Walter Bresette (July 4, 1947 – February 21, 1999) was a prominent Ojibwe activist, politician, and author most notable for work on environmental issues and Ojibwe treaty rights in Northern Wisconsin and the Lake Superior region. He founded or co-founded several organizations including Witness for Nonviolence, the Midwest Treaty Network, and the Wisconsin Green Party.

== Early life and education ==
Walter Bresette was born in 1947 and was an enrolled member of the Red Cliff Band of Lake Superior Chippewa in Wisconsin; he was a member of the Loon clan.

He served in the United States Army and was stationed in Japan. After he returned to Red Cliff, he operated a trading-goods store.

He was a skilled graphic artist, designing a series of Ojibwe "moon cards" and other traditional art. He was a gifted oral storyteller, spiritual elder, and keeper of Gitchi Gummi.

== Protests against tribal spearfishing ==
In 1988, a US District Court ruled that the Ojibwe had treaty fishing rights to conduct traditional fishing off reservation during the spawning season of walleye. Protests in the following years became violent as sports fishermen protested what they saw as an unfair advantage, in what became known as the Wisconsin Walleye War. The Red Cliff Band was not as active as others, but Bresette emerged as among the most eloquent and outspoken defenders of the Native American cause of treaty rights fishing. To document the acts of the protesters and inaction by local law enforcement, and to protect the spearfishers, Bresette organized the group Witness for Nonviolence. They organized sympathetic "witnesses" as observers to record on video events at the boat landings, the sites of protests.

During this period, Bresette operated a retail store in a mall in Duluth, Minnesota. Esther Nahgahnub was selling dream catchers from the store, which was raided by the United States Fish and Wildlife Service personnel, who seized several feathers of migratory birds that are protected from commercial exploitation. Bresette and Nahgahnub claimed the right to possess and sell these items due to treaty rights "Bresette & Nahgahnub vs USFWS" aka "Feathergate". In a decision that helped clarify the rights of Ojibwes to possess feathers, a US District Court judge returned the feathers to her. Observers speculated that the seizures were politically motivated, but in the end, the case helped the cause of treaty rights. Bresette later wrote about these events in Walleye Warriors: An Effective Alliance Against Racism and for the Earth (1993), a book co-written with Rick Whaley.

== Mining protests ==
During the 1990s, Bresette focused on opposing proposed sulfide mines in Northern Wisconsin because of expected environmental damages. In each mining battle, Bresette pressed the case of treaty rights and of Ojibwe sovereignty over resources in ceded territory. He co-founded Anishinabe Niijii to oppose mining; he claimed it brought environmental destruction that threatened several key watersheds, including that of Lake Superior. The group unsuccessfully attempted to block operations at a sulfide mine near Ladysmith, Wisconsin. During these protests, Bresette struck mining equipment with the war club of the famous Sauk chief Black Hawk, a gift given to Bresette for his work.

The group did stop the proposed Lynne mine in Oneida County. The primary target of protest during this period was the proposed Crandon mine in Forest County. The zinc sulfide deposits were targeted for extraction by Exxon and other companies, but Bresette and others pointed out the potential danger to the Wolf River watershed and the Mole Lake Ojibwe reservation. At the height of the Crandon controversy, Bresette learned of another mining proposal.

The White Pine mine in Michigan was a mostly defunct copper mine that was to have sulfuric acid poured into its shafts to leach out remaining copper without United States Environmental Protection Agency (EPA) oversight. Citing concerns over degradation to nearby Lake Superior, Bresette resigned an EPA position he held at the time. He became a spokesperson for the group Anishinabe Ogitchida as they staged a protest stopping the tanker cars from carrying the sulfuric acid across the Bad River Ojibwe reservation in Ashland County, Wisconsin. The Bad River Train Blockade brought media scrutiny to EPA process and the eventual end to any attempts to revive the mine.

Bresette lived long enough to see the Wisconsin legislature pass a mining moratorium to postpone the Crandon project indefinitely. He died before two nearby tribes purchased the mine in 2003 to preserve it from development.

== Other political activities ==
Bresette was also highly active in politics at the local, state, and national levels. With a close associate, Frank Koehn of Herbster, Wisconsin, in the 1980s he started the Lake Superior Greens, one of the earliest green parties in the United States. It successfully ran Koehn for the Bayfield County board of supervisors in 1986. This was the first instance of a Green Party candidate winning any elected office in the United States.

Bresette and Koehn were key founding members of the Wisconsin Green Party, which held its first convention in 1988. During the 1990s, Bresette pushed for the Seventh Generation Amendment, also known as the Common Property Amendment, to the United States Constitution. To promote the amendment, Bresette helped organize several protestors to walk completely around Lake Superior. He was active in promoting environmental, treaty rights and human rights issues until his 1999 death of a heart attack in Duluth.

== See also ==
- Crandon mine
- Bad River Train Blockade
- Red Cliff Band of Lake Superior Chippewa
- Frank Koehn
- Wisconsin Green Party
