= Siskiwit Lake (Wisconsin) =

Lake in the state of Wisconsin, United States

- Location within Wisconsin Location within the United States
- Location: Bayfield County, Wisconsin
- Coordinates: 46°47′43″N 091°08′00″W
- Type: Drainage
- Basin countries: United States
- Surface area: 285 acres (1.15 km^{2})
- Max. depth: 13 ft (4.0 m)
- Surface elevation: 1,060 ft (320 m)

Siskiwit Lake is a small eutrophic lake on the Bayfield Peninsula in Bayfield County in northern Wisconsin in the United States. The lake is located about 4.5 miles (7.2 km) south of Siskiwit Bay, an arm of Lake Superior, and about 2 miles (3.2 km) north of the northern boundary of Chequamegon National Forest. Duluth-Superior is about 48 miles (77 km) to the west. Parts of the small town of Bell border the lake, and there are several houses and vacation cabins on the lake, most on the north shore. The nearest major road, Wisconsin Highway 13, is about 3.5 miles (5.6 km) to the north, and the nearest large town, Washburn, is about 14 miles (23 km) to the southeast, down County Trunk Highway C.

Siskiwit Lake is 285 acres (1.15 km^{2}) in area with a maximum depth of 13 feet (4.0 m) and a shoreline circumference of four miles (6.4 km). The lake contains a two-acre (8,100 m^{2}) island, Long Island (another small quasi-island, Round Island, is actually attached to the mainland). The deeper part of the lake is to the east, with a long narrow bay stretching northwest of Long Island. The lake drains at the eastern end into the Siskiwit River which flows (via Little Siskiwit Lake) into Siskiwit Bay at Cornucopia.

Siskiwit Lake is used for fishing. Northern pike Panfish is present. Walleye is present in abundance. Also present are Smallmouth Bass, Bluegill, Crappie, Pumpkinseed, Sucker, and Yellow Perch, and Brook Trout. There is a boat ramp.
