= Bad River train blockade =

Civil action

The Bad River train blockade was a 1996 action on the Bad River Ojibwe Reservation in Ashland County, Wisconsin, carried out by Ojibwe activists against train shipments of sulfuric acid. The activists blocked the railroad tracks that would have brought the acid to a mine in the Upper Peninsula of Michigan. The action brought national scrutiny on the United States Environmental Protection Agency (EPA) and demonstrated the power of Indigenous rights in environmentalism.

== Background ==
Copper Range Mine Company's copper mine in White Pine, Michigan, had been an employer of thousands in the Upper Peninsula until massive layoffs in the early 1990s that put the region into economic despair. In Wisconsin, several Ojibwe bands were battling to stop sulfide mining at the proposed Crandon mine with newfound political power stemming from the Walleye War.

In 1995 two Bad River tribal members, Lawrence "Butch" Stone and Alan "Buster" Couture, began having dreams that an environmental disaster was coming to the Bad River Reservation. While taking part in traditional sweats, Stone and Couture, among others who would form the Anishinabe Ogichidaa activist group, began receiving messages through dreams and visions from Native American spirits and ancestors. The messages began a year before the EPA published an announcement that sulfide would be moved by rail over the reservation on Wisconsin Central Railroad tracks.

In their dreams, Stone and Couture saw a train derail while crossing the Bad River Reservation, spilling a white powder into the river. The white powder caused disease and death of animals, plants and people, including the destruction of the sacred wild rice sloughs on the reservation at the delta where the Bad River meets Lake Superior. These sloughs had been the reason the Ojibwe settled in northern Wisconsin during their migration from the east coast four hundred years earlier. In that migration, the Ojibwe had, following a prophecy, followed a miigis (cowry) shell to a place where "food grows on water," a prophecy held to be fulfilled when they reached the wild rice waters of Wisconsin.

== History ==
Neither Stone nor Couture knew what the white powder in their dreams was until the EPA's announcement of the sulfide shipment. The Anishinabe Ogichidaa activists made a point of carrying out the blockade in a way that was consistent with their beliefs. They had prepared throughout the prior year with sweats and prayer. Before blockading the tracks, they and other Ogichidaa members consulted with spiritual leaders and tribal elders. On arriving at the tracks to begin the blockade, they prayed, and then laid out sacred ground in a way specified by spiritual leaders, to add strength to their actions, including a sacred fire near the tracks, singing and drum sessions on the tracks, tobacco placed in the four directions and eagle feather lances in the four directions on and near the tracks. Before the blockade Stone and Couture vowed to Gichi Manidoo (Great Spirit) that they would be willing to sacrifice their lives if need be to stop the train from going through.

On July 22, 1996, the activists stopped a train bound for the copper mine as it crossed the reservation. The train was carrying tankers of sulfuric acid for use in pilot solution mining. The mine had drastically scaled back operations and laid off thousands the previous year due to its diminishing profits. Inmet, a Toronto-based corporation, hoped to inject 550 million US gallons (2,100,000 m^{3}) of acid into the mine to bring out any remaining ore. This plan raised concerns among environmentalists that the acid would contaminate groundwater and nearby Lake Superior. The EPA granted permission for the experiment without requiring a hearing or an environmental impact statement. Among those astounded by this decision was Walter Bresette, a Red Cliff Ojibwe activist and Indigenous chair of the EPA'S National Environmental Justice Advisory Council. Bresette resigned his position and joined with the Native rights group Anishinabe Ogichidaa, Ojibwe for "Protector of the People," on a new course of action.

For weeks, Ogichidaa and white allies camped on the railroad tracks conducting ceremonies and protests. Initially, the focus was put on the condition of the Wisconsin Central Ltd. tracks themselves. The activists insisted they were unsafe, though the state had authorized their use provided the speed of the trains did not exceed ten miles per hour. Wisconsin Central insisted that the Ashland County sheriff arrest the protestors, but with the events taking place on the reservation and involving Native religious practices, the sheriff's office declared it a treaty issue and federal matter and therefore took no action. The protesters, in the meantime, also demanded to see the reports stating the railroad was safe to be used for hazardous materials. The United States government made a failed attempt at mediating between the two groups involved; as a result of these attempted mediations, the US government launched a full investigation of the railroad. Following the beginning of this investigation, protestors allowed two trains that did not contain sulfuric acid through to their destination. On August 19, the protest formally ended, the Ojibwe allowing all trains not containing sulfuric acid through to their destination.

There were two instances when the blockade nearly turned violent. The first involved a representative of the Wisconsin Central Railroad, a "troubleshooter" who was experienced in dealing with aboriginal conflicts throughout the world using strong-arm tactics. He approached the Ashland County Sheriff's Department and offered to make their problem go away if the Department would look the other way. Sheriff's Department representatives made it clear to the troubleshooter that such tactics would not be used in Ashland County.

The second crisis point occurred when the Ashland County Sheriff's Department went to the blockade site in force, ostensibly to review the situation and determine what, if anything, needed to be done, including the option of removing the protestors from the tracks. Approximately a dozen armed Sheriff's Department members went to the site. The sheriff spoke with protest leaders. While this went on, Stone pulled the undersheriff aside and advised him that there were armed men in the woods protecting the site, including tribal members with military training, and that if the Sheriff's Department tried to forcibly remove the protestors from the site, Stone might not able to prevent gunfire. The Sheriff's Department representatives left without taking action.

After federal involvement, it came out that the Ojibwe were not only concerned with the safety of the tracks but with the mining project as a whole. On August 2, 1996, Justice Department mediator John Terronez arrived on the scene and began negotiations with parties involved in the dispute. During these talks, Bresette and the Ogichidaa revealed their deep concerns over the solution mining and its potential effect on Lake Superior. Furthermore, they insisted the project was illegal because the EPA had given it approval without consulting affected Indian tribes who as sovereign entities were entitled to be involved in the process. An agreement was reached with the protestors agreeing to end the blockade in exchange for an EPA inquiry into the project. In September, the EPA announced they would be holding a meeting regarding this potential mining project, and were in favor of the mining. The trains hauled the acid through the reservation and the protestors switched their focus to the mine itself. However, once the EPA looked closer, it raised enough questions that, on October 14, Inmet suspended its operations, citing the extended amount of time the EPA's Environmental Analysis would take, and the uncertain future of the mine. In the face of legal battles over treaty rights, the company withdrew its mining permit application the next spring. Following its additional research, the EPA was able to announce with certainty that the railroads in Wisconsin were up to their standards, but the sulfuric acid shipments had already been discontinued.

The railroad branch remained in occasional operation until at least 2011 but was embargoed in 2012 due to structural issues on a bridge. As of 2016 the only parent line serving the branch is also out of service following a bridge collapse in a flood.

== See also ==
- Bad River Chippewa Band
- Crandon mine
- Walter Bresette
- Wisconsin Walleye War
