= Siskiwit Lake =

Siskiwit Lake may refer to:

- Siskiwit Lake (Isle Royale) in Lake Superior
- Siskiwit Lake (Wisconsin)
