= Sand Bay, Wisconsin =

- Unincorporated community
- Location within Wisconsin Location within the United States
- Coordinates: 46°56′45″N 90°53′28″W
- Country: United States
- State: Wisconsin
- County: Bayfield
- Town: Russell
- Elevation: 630 ft (190 m)
- Time zone: UTC-6 (Central (CST))
  - Summer (DST): UTC-5 (CDT)
- Area codes: 715 and 534
- GNIS feature ID: 1573653

Sand Bay is an unincorporated community in the town of Russell, Bayfield County, Wisconsin, United States. The community is located within the Red Cliff Indian Reservation.

Sand Bay is located on the South Shore of Lake Superior, 14 miles (23 km) north-northwest of the city of Bayfield. The community is also located 37 miles north-northwest of the city of Ashland.
