= Cornucopia, Wisconsin =

Census-designated place in Wisconsin, United States

- Census-designated place
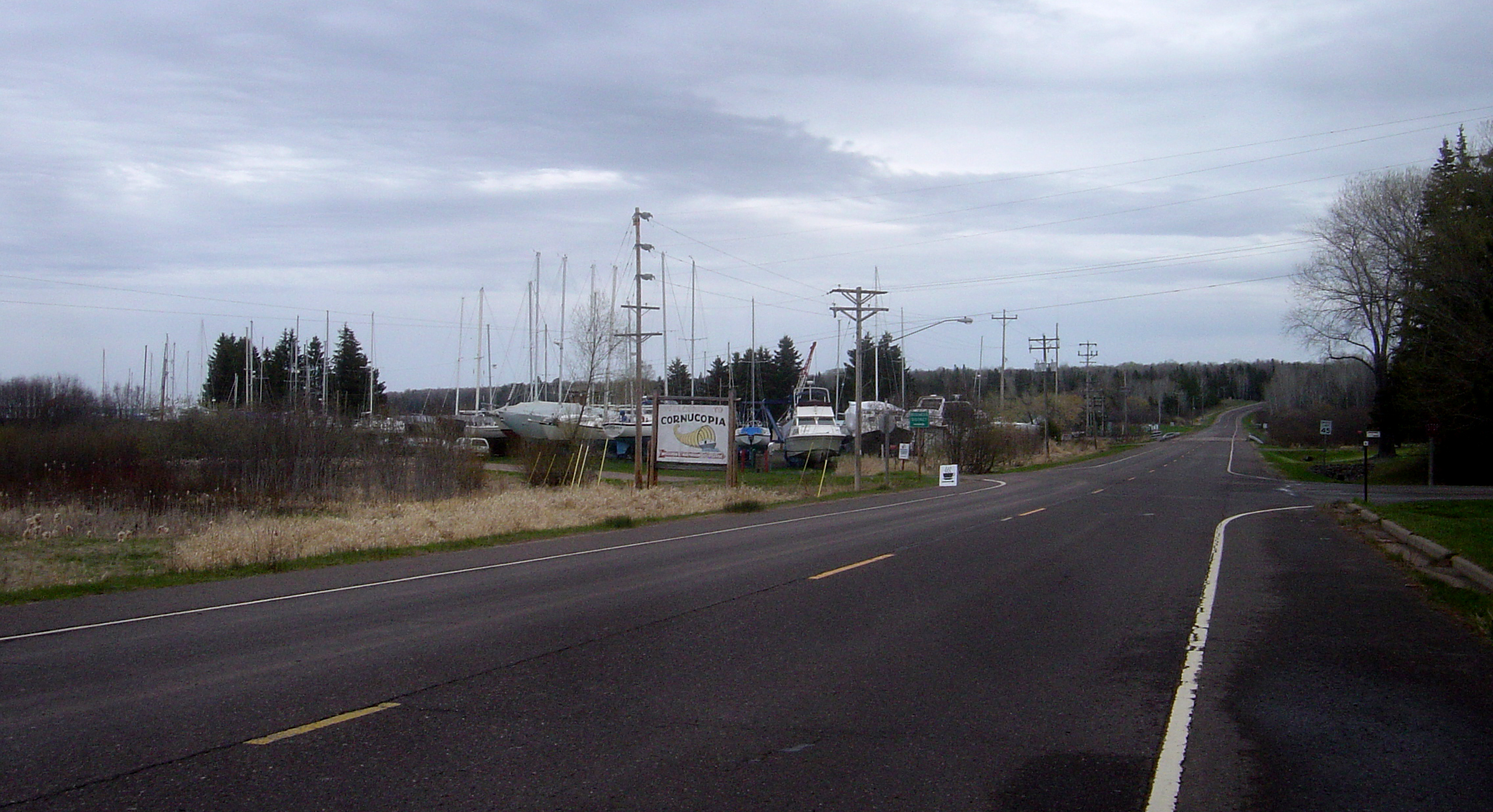
- Cornucopia along Highway 13

- Location within Wisconsin
- Coordinates: 46°51′14″N 91°06′07″W
- Country: United States
- State: Wisconsin
- County: Bayfield
- Town: Bell

Area
  - Total: 2.264 sq mi (5.86 km^{2})
  - Land: 2.264 sq mi (5.86 km^{2})
  - Water: 0 sq mi (0 km^{2})
- Elevation: 623 ft (190 m)

Population (2020)
  - Total: 103
  - Density: 45.5/sq mi (17.6/km^{2})
- Time zone: UTC-6 (Central (CST))
  - Summer (DST): UTC-5 (CDT)
- ZIP code: 54827
- Area codes: 715 and 534
- GNIS feature ID: 1579043

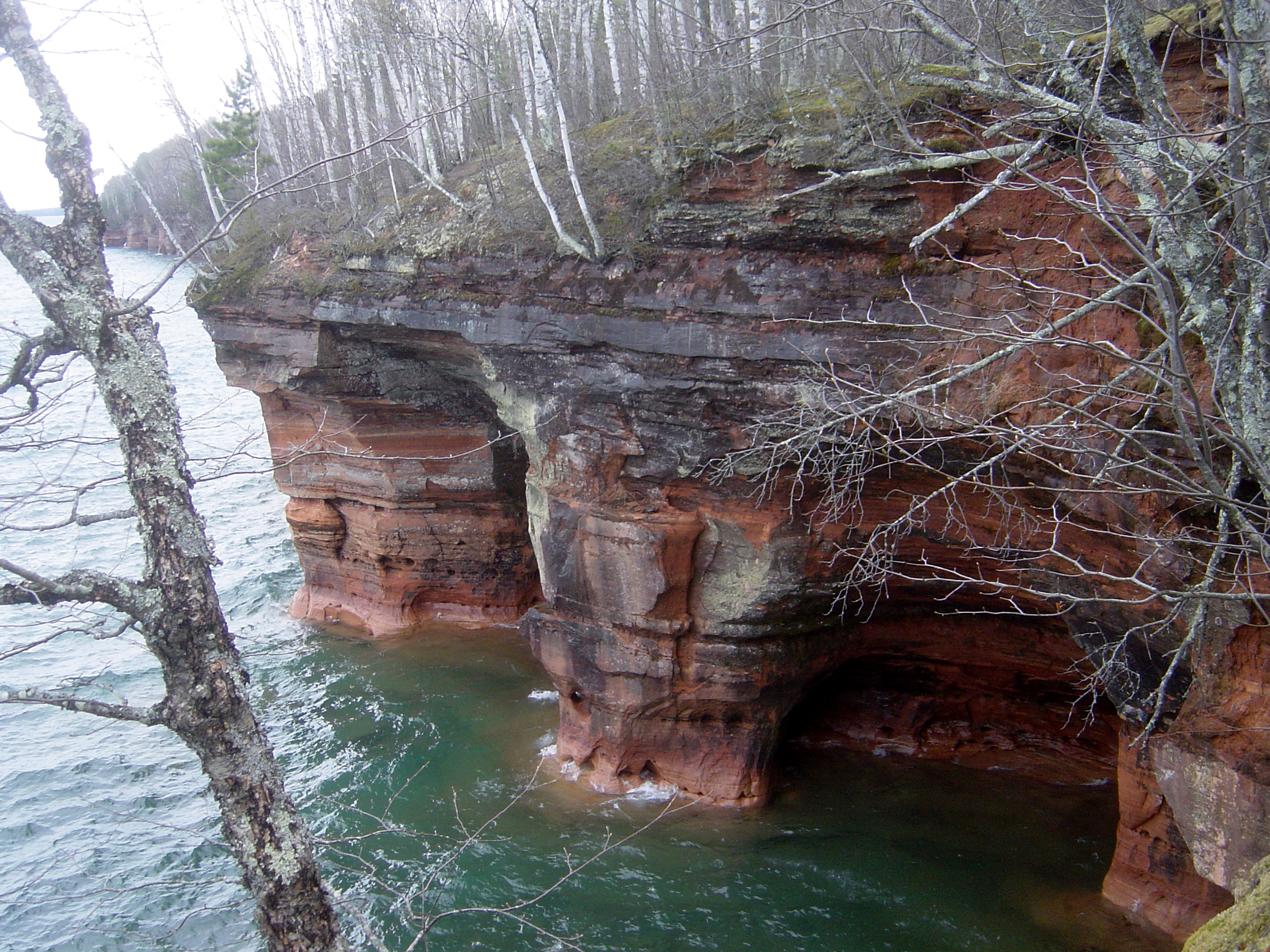
Mawikwe Bay Sea Caves, part of the Apostle Islands National Lakeshore near Cornucopia

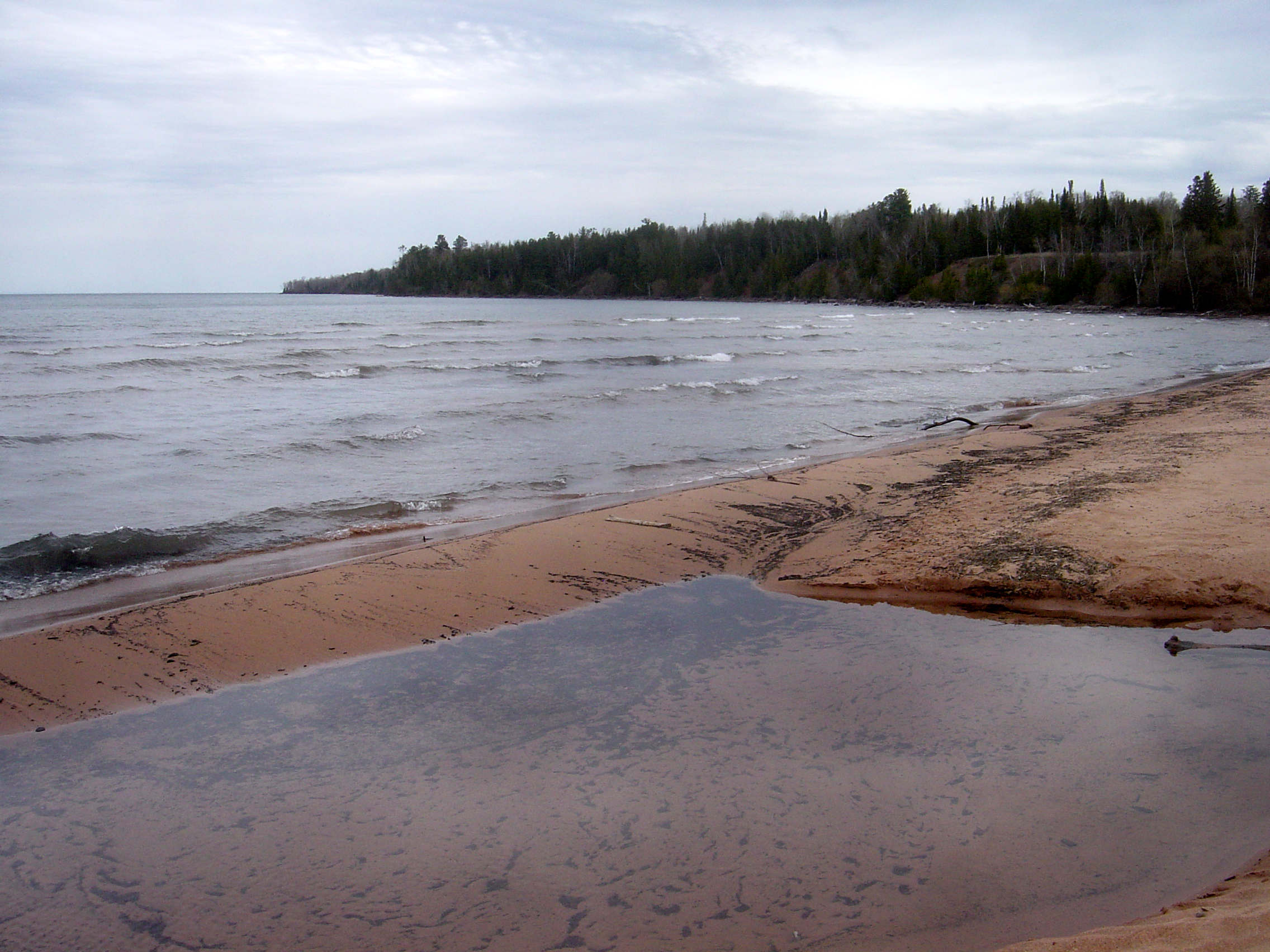
The swimming beach on Lake Superior

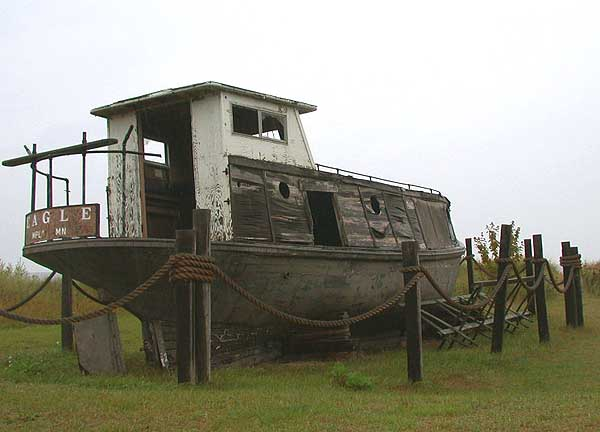
Abandoned boat along Wisconsin Highway 13 in Cornucopia

Cornucopia is an unincorporated census-designated place in the town of Bell in northern Bayfield County, Wisconsin, United States. It is situated on Lake Superior at the northern end of the Bayfield Peninsula. It is along Wisconsin Highway 13 and County Highway C. As of the 2020 census, its population was 103, an increase over the figure of 98 tabulated in 2010. The community borders the lake at Siskiwit Bay, between Roman's Point and Mawikwe (formerly Squaw) Point. It is near a mainland portion of the Apostle Islands National Lakeshore, which features the Mawikwe Bay Sea Caves.

Most residents of the Town of Bell with Cornucopia mailing addresses are considered residents of Cornucopia.

== Geography ==
Cornucopia has an area of 2.264 square miles (5.86 km^{2}), all land.

== History ==
The Ojibwe used the Siskiwit Bay area as a temporary camp and a stopover on the way to La Pointe. "Siskiwit" comes from an Ojibwe word for a subspecies of Lake trout known in English as a "fat trout". A historical marker at the Cornucopia beach tells of the Tragedy of the Siskiwit, an Ojibwe battle on that site with a band of Meskwaki that lead to several deaths and the kidnapping of a chief's son.

The first white settlers in the Siskiwit Bay area were loggers who came at the close of the nineteenth century. Remnants of this period include abandoned railroad pilings in Siskiwit Lake and a legend of stolen gold on Gold Hill at the southeastern edge of the community.

The first farmers were "Russians" who came to the Town of Bell from the Austrian Empire via Chicago. They were not Great Russians but Carpatho-Russians or Rusyns, an ethnic group found in the mountainous borderlands of Poland, Slovakia, Ukraine, and, Romania. Rusyn surnames found in Cornucopia include Kaseno, Celinsky, Sveda, Roman, and Pristash.

Commercial fishing for lake trout, whitefish, and freshwater herring has traditionally operated out of Cornucopia's harbor. The Jones, Ehlers, Johnson, and Ivanow families kept the fishing industry going during the twentieth century. Today only the Halvorson family engages in commercial fishing out of Cornucopia.

In 1903, T.J. Stevenson and Albert Wescott, two land speculators from Iowa established a post office and gave the village the name "Cornucopia" for its abundance of resources. A centennial celebration in 2003 recognized this event.

After World War II, Cornucopia's natural environment led tourism to replace logging, farming, and fishing as the dominant industry of the community. Today, most working-age residents are engaged in trades, service, or seasonal employment.

== Landmarks ==
The Bell Town Hall, a large brick building in the center of the community, was a school until the 1970s. Today children from Cornucopia attend school at the South Shore School in Port Wing, Wisconsin, 15 miles to the west. The town was awarded a grant to remodel the town hall, making it more accessible, building a new kitchen, and replacing windows. It is the site of many weddings and family gatherings and host to community events, such as the annual fish fry. The baseball diamond was the home field of the Cornucopia Little League baseball team.

Cornucopia is the home of three active churches: St. Ann's Roman Catholic, Immanuel Lutheran, and St. Mary's Orthodox Church of America. St. Mary's was originally built as a Russian Orthodox church. Its design includes an enclosed bell tower and a small onion dome.

The Cornucopia Historic (Green Shed) Museum lies on the harbor. It contains displays of photographs, family histories and historic artifacts and is open seasonally from mid June to early October.

The Cornucopia Post Office is Wisconsin’s northernmost post office.

== Economy ==
Ehlers General Store

Siskiwit Bay Marina is near the center of Cornucopia, WI where boaters from all over the midwest come to enjoy their summer times.

Lumberman Walter Flieth and fisherman Herman Ehlers started the Flieth-Ehlers Mercantile Company in 1915. Now known as Ehlers' General Store, it has been the social and commercial center of the community since its beginnings.

Cornucopia has a harbor where the Siskiwit River meets Lake Superior. Today, two marinas, one private and one municipal, operate out of Cornucopia. There is also an extensive sand swimming beach. Numerous gift shops and lodging places line the harbor.

The community was once home to the Cornucopia Yacht Club, an imaginary yacht club founded by Hale, Roger, and Scot O'Malley in 1975. The O'Malleys founded the club to gain access to yacht club marinas in other cities, which generally required a reciprocal agreement with another club. While the club printed membership cards and made its own jackets, it never had its own marina or building; its mailing address was "Pier 99", which was actually a post office box at Cornucopia's post office. Membership cost $5 a year, and members were not required to own a boat; the application instead asked what members would name their boats if they had one. The club once boasted over 700 members, including several who had never been to Cornucopia; according to the founders, this tally included former U.S. President Gerald Ford and his wife Betty.

== Annual events ==
Harold Ehlers of Cornucopia(right) is presented the annual Cribbage League trophy by Red Cliff's Mark Duffy.

Cornucopia Day takes place every year on the second Saturday in August. The event, put on for the benefit of the volunteer fire department and ambulance service, includes a 5K Run, bike ride, fish, brats & corn, parade, flea market and raffles.

The Annual Fish Fry takes place on the Sunday closest to July 4.

The Annual Turkey Dinner takes place the first Sunday of the deer hunting season, which is the Sunday before Thanksgiving.

Cribbage League is a five-week cribbage contest between the residents of Cornucopia and the nearby community of Red Cliff, Wisconsin, taking place every January and February.

An annual fly in for pilots takes place at the Cornucopia Airport each year in June during the weekend closest to the summer solstice.

== Images ==
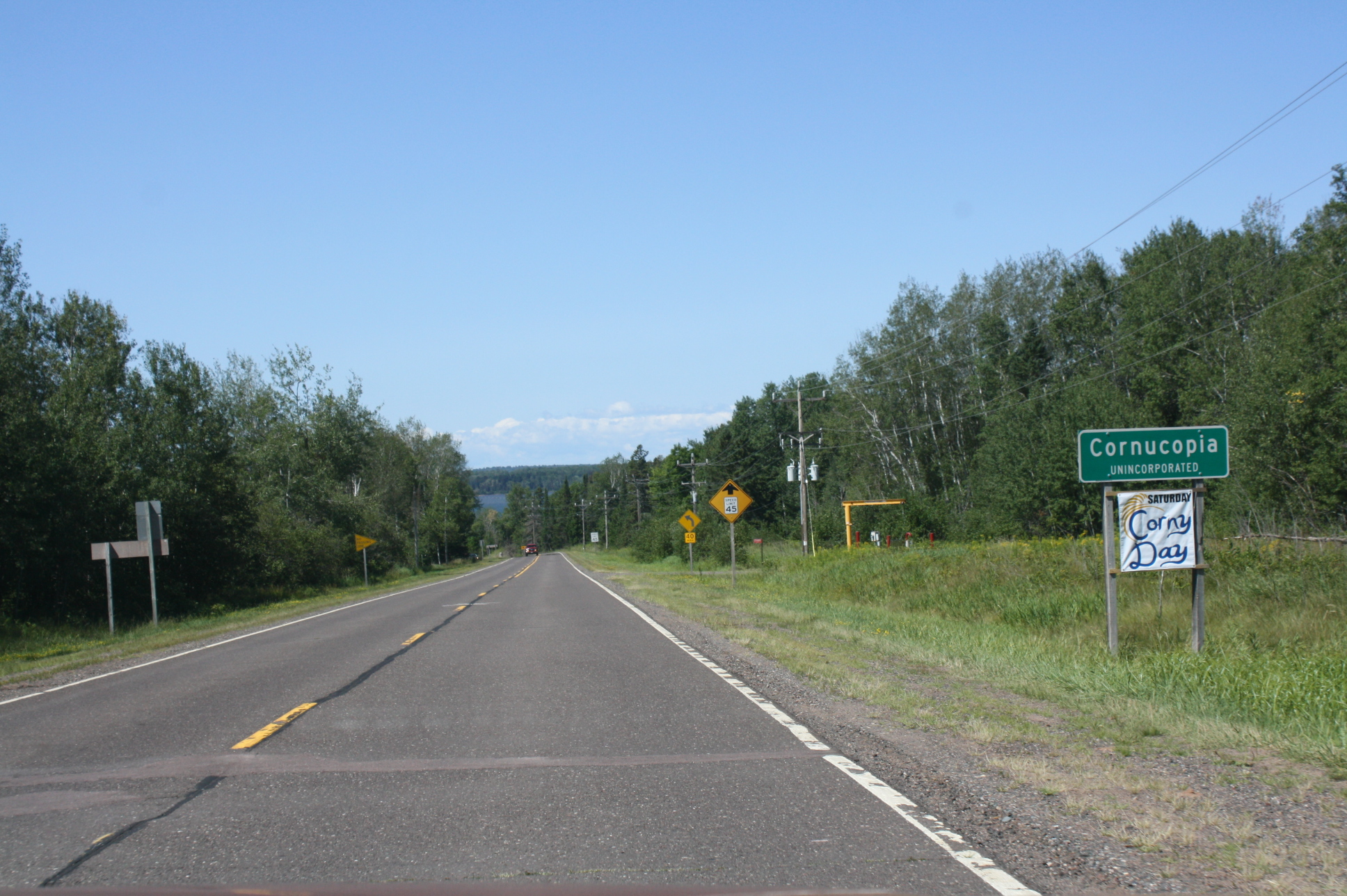
Sign on WIS 13

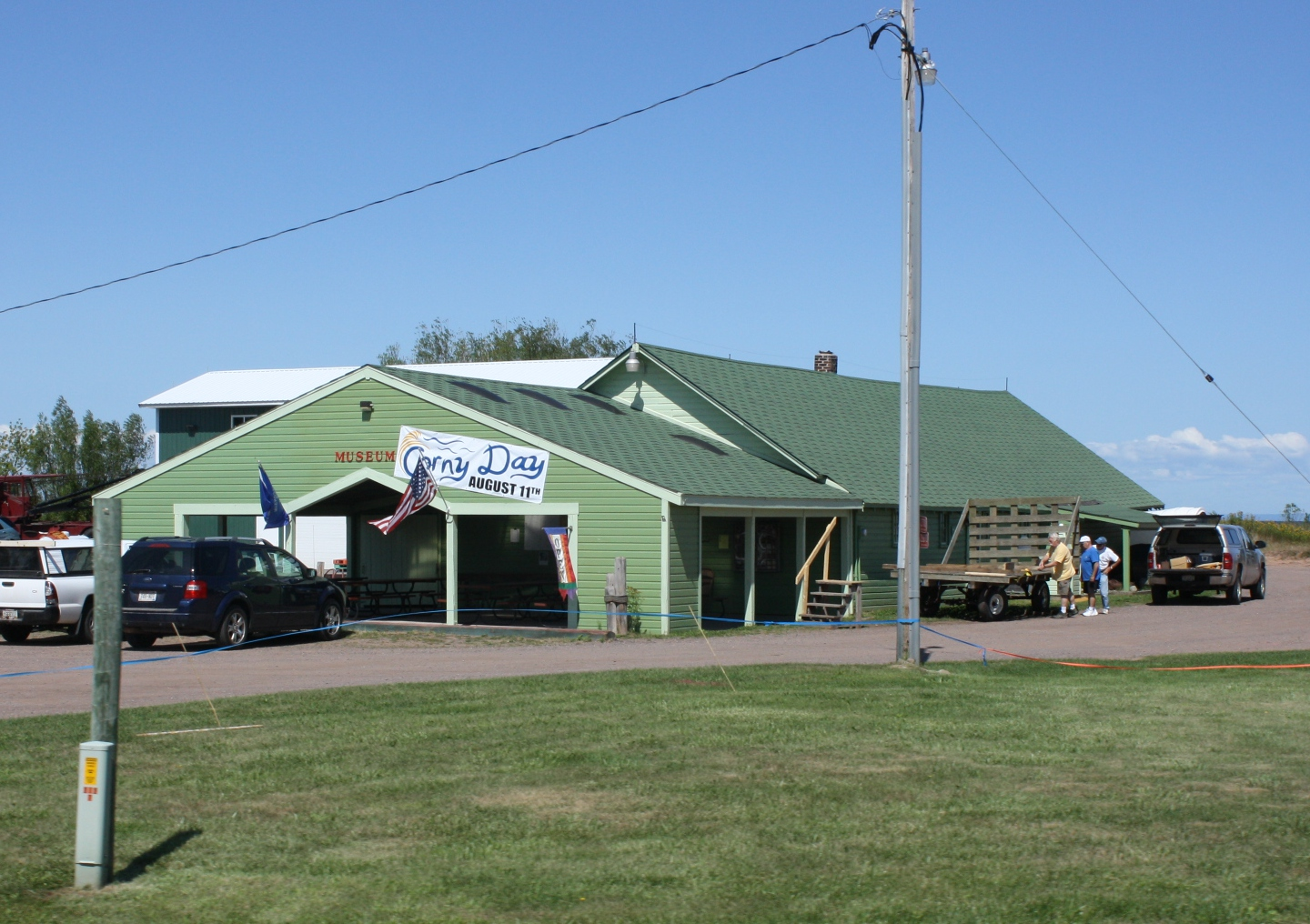
Museum

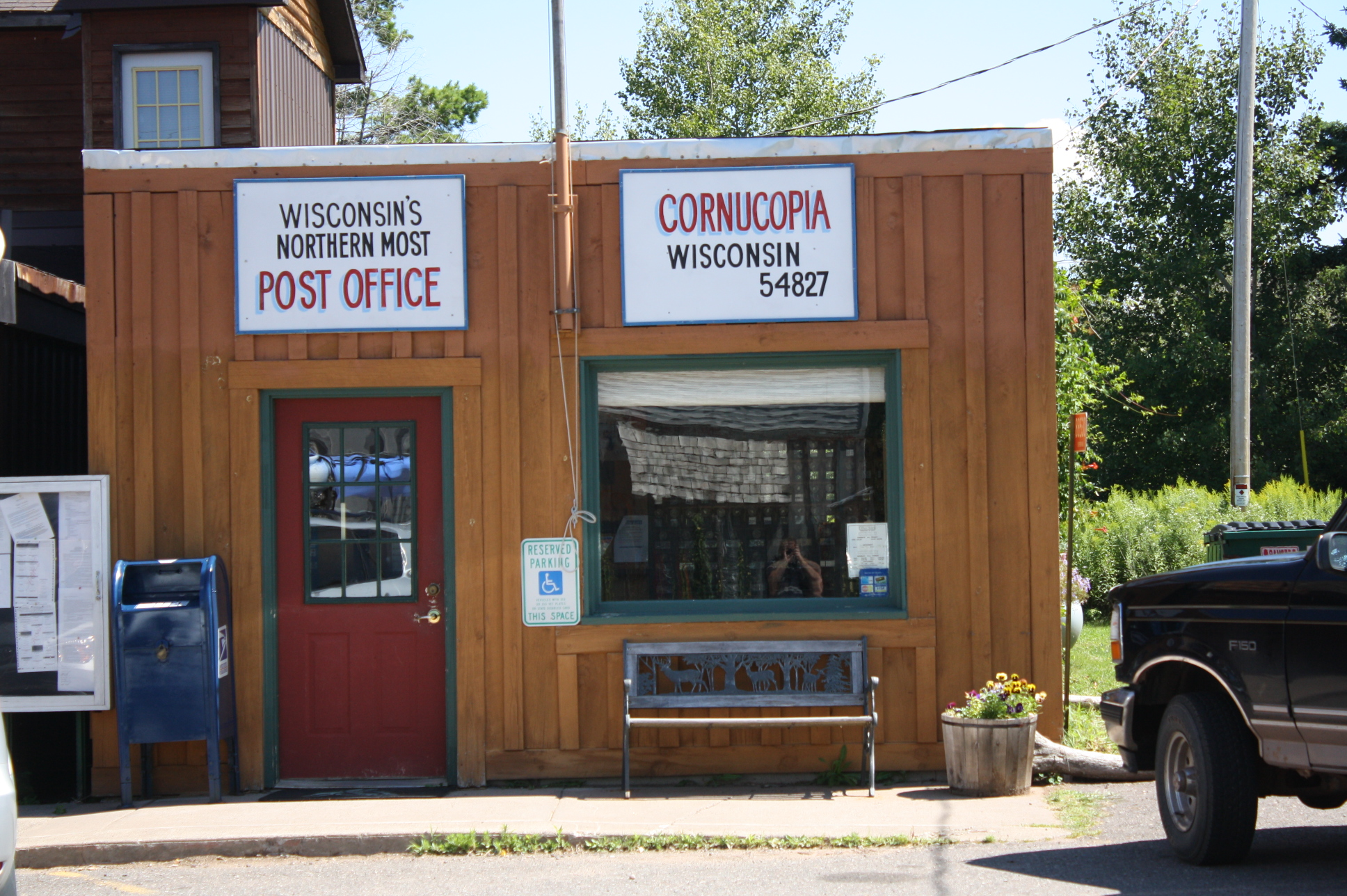
Post office

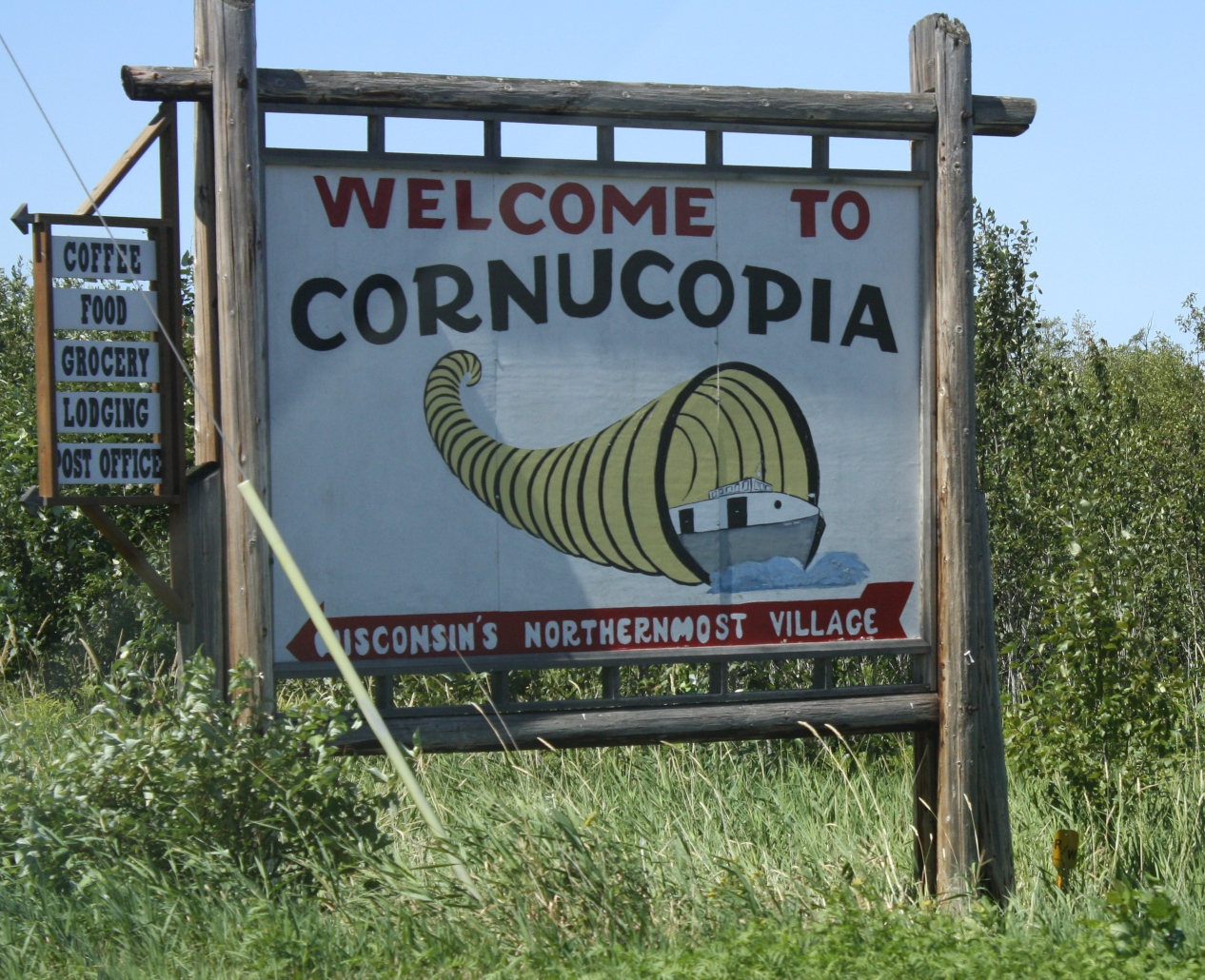
Welcome sign
