= York Island (Wisconsin) =

Island in Wisconsin, United States

Coordinates: 46°58′59″N 090°51′49″W

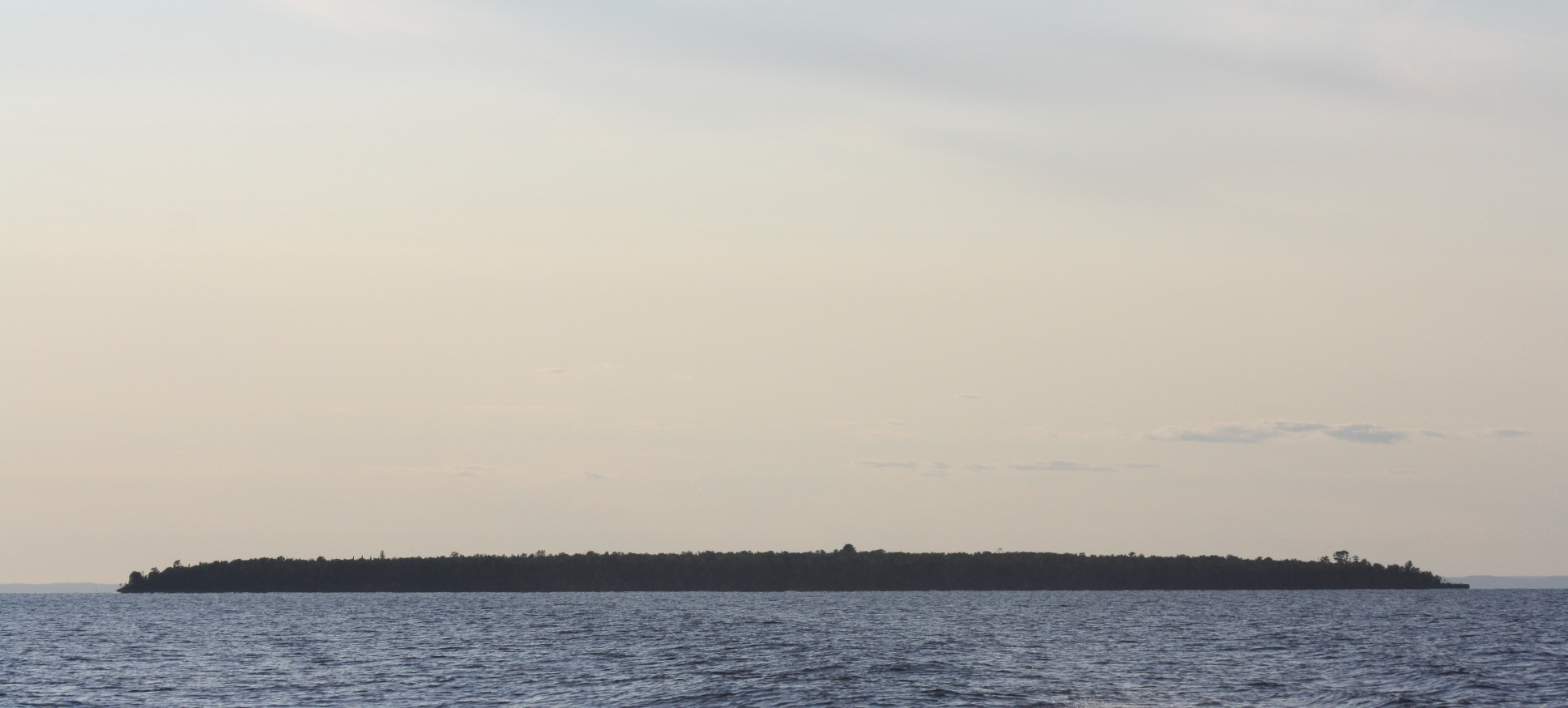
York Island at sunset

York Island is one of the Apostle Islands in northern Wisconsin, in Lake Superior, and is part of the Apostle Islands National Lakeshore. It is located in the Town of Russell in Bayfield County.
