= Wisconsin Green Party =

- Chairperson: Dave Schwab
- Founded: 1988
- Headquarters: Madison, Wisconsin
- Ideology: Green politics
- Political position: Left-wing
- National affiliation: Green Party of the United States
- Colors: Green
- State Senate: 0 / 33
- State Assembly: 0 / 99
- Wisconsin Conservation Congress: 2 / 360
- Other elected offices: 2 (June 2019)

Website
- www.wisconsingreenparty.org

The Wisconsin Green Party (WIGP) is one of five recognized political parties in the state of Wisconsin and is an active member of the Green Party of the United States.

== History ==
The Wisconsin Green Party emerged in the late 1980s when several independent local Green groups combined. Walter Bresette and Frank Koehn of the Lake Superior Greens were instrumental figures in the early years of the party's development. Koehn's election to the Bayfield County board in 1986 was the first time a Green Party candidate had ever been elected to an office in the United States. Dennis Boyer, Richard Latker, Joyce Melville and others established a large chapter in Madison that brought together veteran activists (many of them former members of the Labor-Farm Party, which disintegrated in 1987 after Greens and Marxists in the party failed to agree on a platform) and student activists affiliated with the UW-Madison Greens.

In 2006, the party helped place antiwar initiatives on the ballots in 32 towns (24 of which passed those propositions). In the spring of 2006, nine of 13 Green Party candidates won races in which they ran. John Hardin (Barron County), Ben Farrell (Winnebago County), Bob Ryan (Door County), Barbara Vedder (Dane County), John Hendrick (Dane County), and Kyle Richmond (Dane County) all won re-election to their respective county board seats. Vedder had been appointed to an open seat a few months before the election.

Jeff Peterson (Polk County) and Ashok Kumar (Dane County) took their seats as county board officials for the first time, as did Eric Krszjzaniek (Portage County) who won a recount of write-in votes with an original 5-7 loss turning into an 8-3 win.

On April 3, 2007 a further seven out of 14 Green Party candidates running for office won their elections throughout Wisconsin. This brought the total number of elected Greens in Wisconsin to 22.

The Wisconsin Green Party's headquarters are in Madison.

== Statewide nominees ==
- 2002 - Jim Young, Governor
- 2002 - Paul Aschenbrenner, Treasurer
- 2006 - Nelson Eisman, Governor
- 2006 - Leon Todd, Lieutenant Governor
- 2006 - Winston Sephus, Treasurer
- 2006 - Michael LaForest, Secretary of State
- 2006 - Rae Vogeler, U.S. Senate
- 2014 - Ron Hardy, Treasurer

== Presidential nominee results ==
Since 1996, the national Green Party has run a candidate for President of the United States. In that year, Green Party nominee, Ralph Nader was on the ballot as an independent. The party's highest vote total came in 2000, when Ralph Nader received over 94,000 votes. The lowest vote total came in 2004, when David Cobb was the nominee. His campaign received only 2,661 votes. Nader, who was also on the ballot as an independent candidate, received over 16,000 votes.

In the 2024 Presidential election, Jill Stein was the nominee for the Party but only received 12,266 (0.4%) votes in Wisconsin.

Year	Nominee	Votes
1996	Ralph Nader	28,723 (1.31%)
2000	Ralph Nader	94,070 (3.62%)
2004	David Cobb	2,661 (0.10%)
2008	Cynthia McKinney	4,216 (0.14%)
2012	Jill Stein	7,665 (0.25%)
2016	Jill Stein	31,072 (1.04%)
2024	Jill Stein	12,266 (0.4%)

== Notable Wisconsin Greens ==
- Walter Bresette
- Frank Koehn
