= Wisconsin Walleye War =

Dispute over Ojibwe fishing rights

- Date: 1987–1991
- Location: Northern Wisconsin
- Caused by: Opposition to Ojibwe (Chippewa) hunting and fishing rights
- Methods: Petitions, protests, harassment, riots, assault

Parties
Stop Treaty Abuse (STA), Protect America's Rights and Resources (PARR), Equal Rights for Everyone (ERFE), sports fishermen, resort owners	Lac Courte Oreilles, Red Cliff, Mole Lake, St. Croix, Bad River, and Lac du Flambeau Ojibwe spearfishers

Lead figures
Dean Crist	Tom Maulson

Casualties
- Arrested: Hundreds

The Wisconsin Walleye War became the name for late 20th-century events in Wisconsin in protest of Ojibwe (Chippewa) hunting and fishing rights. In a 1975 case, the tribes challenged state efforts to regulate their hunting and fishing off the reservations, based on their rights in the treaties of St. Peters (1837) and La Pointe (1842). On August 21, 1987, U.S. District Court judge Barbara Crabb ruled that six Ojibwe tribal governments had the right under these treaties for hunting and fishing throughout their former territory.

Protests erupted in Wisconsin among sports fishermen and resort owners who were opposed to tribal members spearfishing walleye during spawning season. Protests continued into 1991 against the Ojibwe walleye harvests. Tribal supporters successfully petitioned federal courts to issue an injunction against the protesters, curbing the protest events at boat landings.

The events were chronicled in a Mother Jones 1991 article, books published in 1994 and 2002, and the documentary film Lighting the Seventh Fire (1995).

== Background of court cases ==
During the 1970s, American Indian activism increased on a number of fronts, in terms of land claims, treaty rights, and tribal sovereignty to exercise traditional practices. This particular conflict started in 1973, when two members of the Lac Courte Oreilles Band of the Ojibwe Nation crossed a reservation boundary that divided Chief Lake, cut a hole in the ice, and harvested fish with spears, contrary to Wisconsin state laws. In a class taught by attorney Larry Leventhal, the members had learned their band held by treaty an unresolved claim to off-reservation hunting and fishing rights in the northern part of the state. The members were arrested and a Sawyer County judge convicted them under state law of poaching, as they were fishing out of season.

The Lac Courte Oreilles band joined the legal fight on behalf of the two tribal members, contending that they had the right to fish off the reservation without restrictions because of mid-19th-century treaties made by the bands with the U.S. government; at the time, the bands ceded hundreds of thousands of acres of land to the U.S. The case was heard in U.S. District Court as it related to treaty rights. This court upheld the band's treaty rights to traditional hunting and fishing throughout its former territories, without regulation by the state. The state appealed, and the Seventh Court of Appeals' decision also upheld the rights of the Ojibwe. The state appealed again, but the United States Supreme Court declined to hear the state's argument to reverse the lower court decision. After the highest court refused to reverse, five other Ojibwe bands joined the Lac Courte Oreilles' legal action. The Seventh Circuit sent the case back to U.S. District Court with instructions for the court to determine the scope of the treaty rights and to resolve conflicts related to regulation of off-reservation resources.

On August 21, 1987, the U.S. District Court Judge Barbara Crabb ruled that six Ojibwe tribal governments had the right under these federal treaties for hunting and fishing throughout their former territories. In settling questions about regulation of off-reservation hunting and fishing, Judge Crabb ruled the state could intervene to protect natural resources, but that tribes had the right first to establish their own regulatory system. This could prevail if they showed the court their system was as protective of the resource as was the state's system. After detailed scientific testimony, Crabb approved a natural resource code adopted by the six tribal governments, which allowed members to harvest walleye and other fish using traditional methods during the spawning season, when lakes are closed to state-licensed anglers.

== Conflict ==
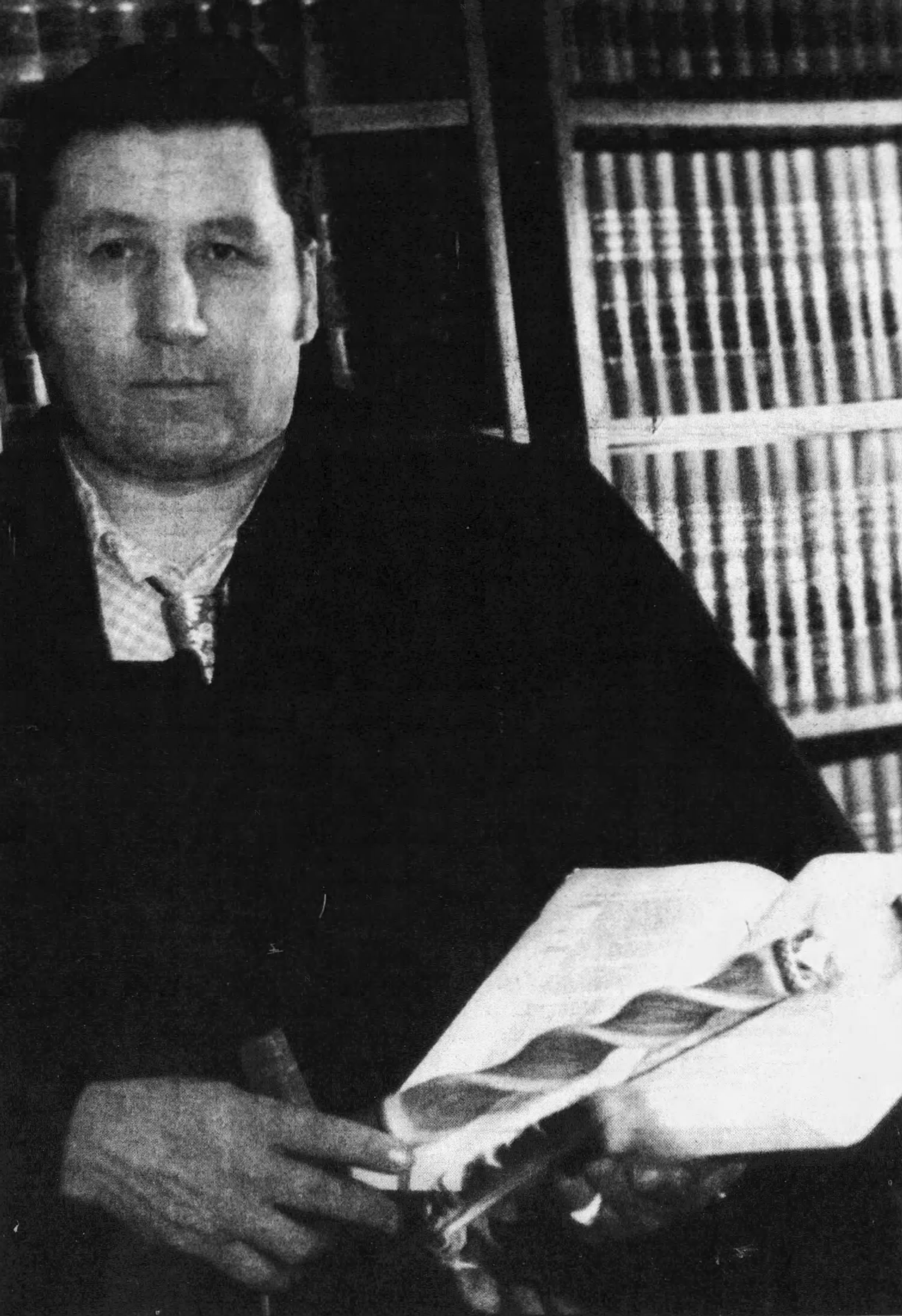
Tom Maulson in 1986

By late April 1988 of the spring spearfishing season, residents and visitors of Park Falls, Wisconsin, rallied at Butternut Lake. A band of fishers were led by Tom Maulson, a former judge and council member of the Lac du Flambeau Band. The crowd pressed against the fishers, the tribal wardens, and the few state game wardens, pushing them toward the water. Local police declined to render aid, and the standoff lasted until a convoy of officers was brought from Superior, almost 100 miles (160 km) distant. They made their way through the crowd to rescue the fishers and game wardens.

With the opening of the 1989 fishing season, the Ojibwe and other interested groups wondered what would take place. Governor Tommy Thompson, a Republican, mobilized the state's Division of Emergency Government to form a Treaty Rights Task Force. He ordered them to find a way to keep the peace. Dressed in riot gear, police stood shoulder to shoulder, often three deep, with sticks and shields ready to stop the crowd if they pressed past snow fences hastily erected for crowd control.

During the spring walleye spawning seasons of 1989, 1990, and 1991, the task force deployed hundreds of police officers from around the state to help local sheriffs maintain order at lakes where Ojibwe members began exercising their newly reaffirmed rights. Hundreds of protesters lined boat landings to make their case that tribal members enjoyed "special rights" under Crabb's decision. They shouted offensive slogans and sometimes threw rocks at the tribal fishers and the protection officials. At protests and in Park Falls itself, white townspeople disseminated racist propaganda, including posters with a mock advertisement for an "Indian Shoot" (which also included racist sentiment against Black, Hmong, and Cuban people), t-shirts and posters with the slogan "Save a Walleye, Spear an Indian" on them, and Ojibwe being lynched in effigy. To disrupt the fishing, protesters launched boats and circled the fishers at high speed, trying to upend the Ojibwe fishers, who were standing in boats to spear fish by lamplight. Other protesters joined mass arrests, at least one of which degraded into a melee when police moved to seize sound amplification devices from protest leaders.

In 1989, pro-treaty groups organized as the Midwest Treaty Network in support of the Ojibwe fishing families. Activists such as Walter Bresette of the Red Cliff Band from northern Wisconsin and Minneapolis–St. Paul asked witnesses to document by video the anti-Indian harassment and violence at the boat landings. He issued Witness for Nonviolence Reports in 1990 and 1991. Convoys of activists from the American Indian Movement in Minneapolis also joined the protests, playing native drums to sound above emergency power generators and protesters' chants.

== Resolution ==
Protests subsided in 1991 as a result of developments on several fronts.

On April 10, 1990, the first day of spearing season the previous year, Governor Tommy Thompson signed a bill authorizing a fine of as much as $1,000 for anyone preventing Ojibwe from spearfishing.

During the spring of 1991, because of a late thaw, the Vilas County Sheriff imposed weight limits on county roads that prohibited travel by the heavy satellite news vehicles sent by local and national TV news departments to cover the protests. Protesters could show up, but there was no chance of being interviewed on camera. Seeing a significant drop in heightened emotion at the boat landings. During the following years, weight limits were again imposed at the same time as spearing season.

The Lake of the Torches Casino in nearby Lac du Flambeau had recently opened. Many who lived on the reservation now had full time jobs at the gaming establishment and stopped their participation in spearing fish for fear of losing their jobs if they were absent.

Dean Crist, head of the "Stop Treaty Abuse", and Tom Maulson, tribal chairman from Lac du Flambeau were interviewed on camera, not at the boat landings, but outside their places of business during the day with no protests in the background.

Judge Crabb issued an injunction against the "Stop Treaty Abuse" group for physically harassing and blocking the exercise of treaty rights by the Lac du Flambeau Ojibwe.

The Wisconsin Department of Natural Resources and Great Lakes Indian Fish and Wildlife Commission reported that the Ojibwe speared only 3% of the walleye in treaty-ceded territory. By this time, protest leaders had lost considerable prestige by reports of their groups' racially motivated chants, gunshots, bombings, and frequent rock throwing and slingshot attacks. Also in 1991, the newly elected Wisconsin Attorney General, James Doyle, reached an agreement with the six tribes by which neither the state nor the Ojibwe would further appeal the federal court rulings.

The state legislature passed a hunters' protection law and a law requiring schools statewide to include information about local tribes in history and geography curricula. This included an explanation of the treaty rights they had acquired in exchange for ceding hundreds of thousands of acres of land to the U.S., which benefited countless European-American settlers. Later in the 1990s, some of those sportfishing groups that had originally opposed Native American fishing rights, worked with northern Wisconsin tribes to protect the fish from industry plans for metallic sulfide mining, particularly the Crandon mine.

As a result of the protests, a team of federal, state, and tribal biologists formed the Joint Assessment Steering Committee in 1990 to analyze the impact of sportfishing and spearfishing on walleye populations. More than 20 years of research by the panel of fisheries biologists has shown that the walleye resource is not harmed by spring spearing, noting that only 9% of the tribal harvest is made up of females.

== In popular culture ==
The treaty rights fishing battles captured national attention from media, including the political magazine Mother Jones. The events, issues, and people were explored in Lighting the Seventh Fire, a 1995 documentary film made by Sandra Osawa and broadcast nationally on PBS on July 4, 1995. The title refers to an Ojibwe prophecy about the seventh fire, when the people's traditions will be revived after a time of trial.

Two books have also been written about the events. The bands' legal challenges are considered to be part of a renewal of activism since the late 20th century by Native American tribes to exercise their treaty rights, pursue land claims, exercise rights to traditional hunting and fishing when not explicitly addressed in a treaty, and exercise sovereignty.

== See also ==
- Crandon mine
- Bad River Train Blockade
- Walter Bresette
