= Bayfield Peninsula =

Northern peninsula on Lake Superior, Wisconsin

Coordinates: 46°46′N 91°02′W

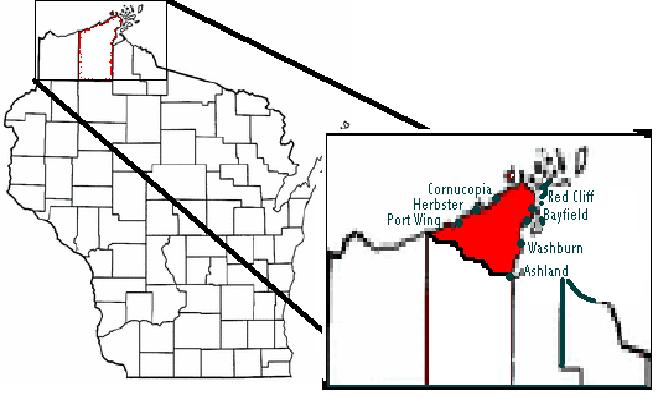
The Bayfield Peninsula

The Bayfield Peninsula is a peninsula on Lake Superior. It is located in Bayfield County, Wisconsin, United States. It is the northernmost region of mainland Wisconsin, with the south shore of Lake Superior to the west and Chequamegon Bay to the east. The peninsula is part of the Lake Superior Lowland, though the interior southeast of Cornucopia and west of Bayfield has some higher ground including Pratt's Peak, Bayfield County's second-highest point. Highway 13 runs around the peninsula along the Superior shoreline. The communities of Port Wing, Herbster, Cornucopia, Red Cliff, Bayfield, Washburn, and Ashland lie on this stretch of highway. The interior of the peninsula is mostly the northern end of the Chequamegon National Forest, an area of jackpine growth known as the Moquah Barrens. The Apostle Islands surround the end of the peninsula.
