= Russell, Bayfield County, Wisconsin =

Russell, Wisconsin
- Town
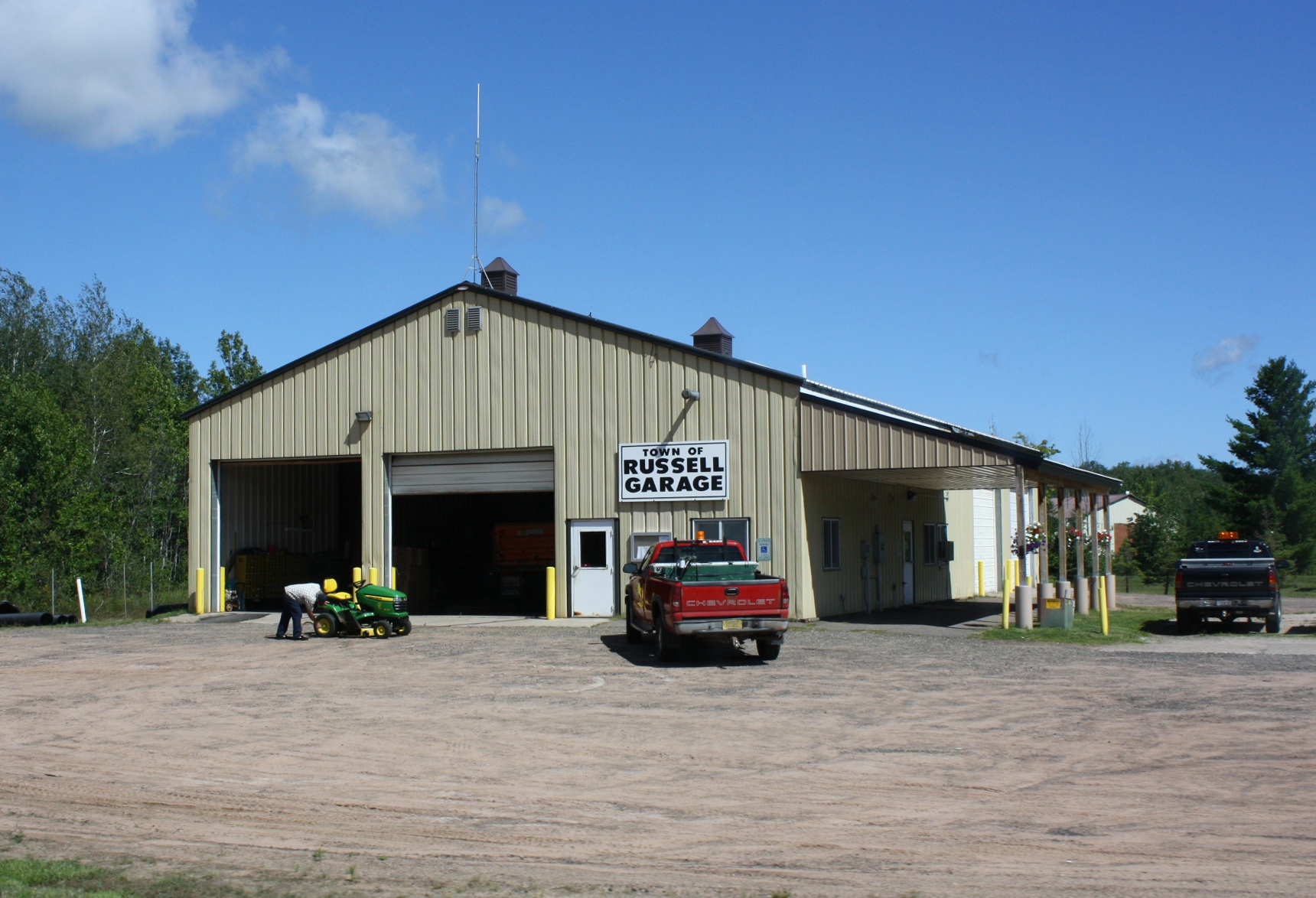
- Town hall

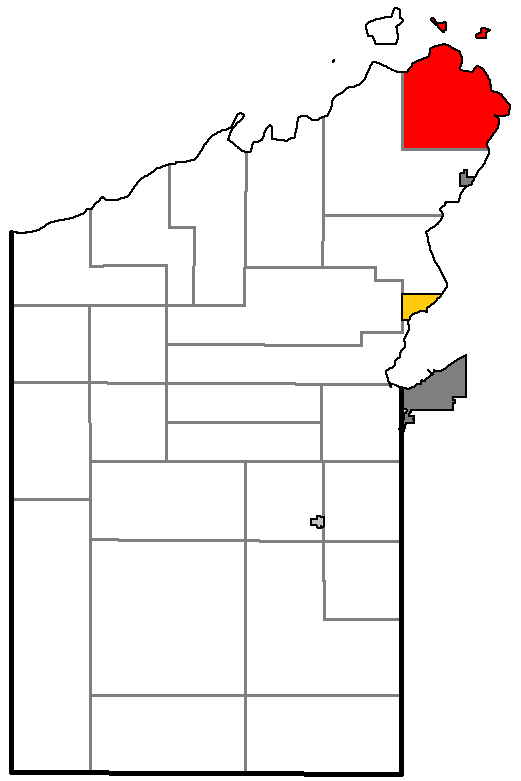
- Location of Russell, within Bayfield County
- Coordinates: 46°54′52″N 90°50′59″W
- Country: United States
- State: Wisconsin
- County: Bayfield

Area
  - Total: 100.1 sq mi (259.3 km^{2})
  - Land: 49.9 sq mi (129.2 km^{2})
  - Water: 50.2 sq mi (130.1 km^{2})
- Elevation: 790 ft (240 m)

Population (2020)
  - Total: 1,553
  - Density: 31.13/sq mi (12.02/km^{2})
- Time zone: UTC-6 (Central (CST))
  - Summer (DST): UTC-5 (CDT)
- Area codes: 715 & 534
- FIPS code: 55-70300
- GNIS feature ID: 1584080
- Website: townofrussellwi.gov

Russell is a town in Bayfield County, Wisconsin, United States. The population was 1,553 at the 2020 census, up from 1,279 at the 2010 census. The unincorporated communities of Red Cliff and Sand Bay are located in Russell. Red Cliff is the administrative center of the Red Cliff Band of Lake Superior Chippewa. York Island and Raspberry Island (of the Apostle Islands) are part of the town.

== Transportation ==
Wisconsin Highway 13 serves as a main route in the community.

== Geography ==
According to the United States Census Bureau, the town has a total area of 100.1 square miles (259.3 km^{2}), of which 49.9 square miles (129.2 km^{2}) is land and 50.2 square miles (130.1 km^{2}), or 50.17%, is water.

== Demographics ==
As of the census of 2000, there were 1,216 people, 406 households, and 306 families residing in the town. The population density was 24.4 people per square mile (9.4/km^{2}). There were 506 housing units at an average density of 10.2 per square mile (3.9/km^{2}). The racial makeup of the town was 21.13% White, 77.55% Native American, 0.08% Asian, 0.08% from other races, and 1.15% from two or more races. Hispanic or Latino of any race were 2.14% of the population.

There were 406 households, out of which 44.8% had children under the age of 18 living with them, 46.8% were married couples living together, 20.2% had a female householder with no husband present, and 24.4% were non-families. 20.9% of all households were made up of individuals, and 5.7% had someone living alone who was 65 years of age or older. The average household size was 2.95 and the average family size was 3.35.

In the town, the population was spread out, with 36.3% under the age of 18, 7.6% from 18 to 24, 28.0% from 25 to 44, 21.9% from 45 to 64, and 6.1% who were 65 years of age or older. The median age was 30 years. For every 100 females, there were 102.7 males. For every 100 females age 18 and over, there were 100.0 males.

The median income for a household in the town was $25,114, and the median income for a family was $27,308. Males had a median income of $23,125 versus $21,827 for females. The per capita income for the town was $10,387. About 22.3% of families and 28.6% of the population were below the poverty line, including 39.0% of those under age 18 and 29.5% of those age 65 or over.
