= Bell, Wisconsin =

Town in Bayfield County, Wisconsin, United States

- Town
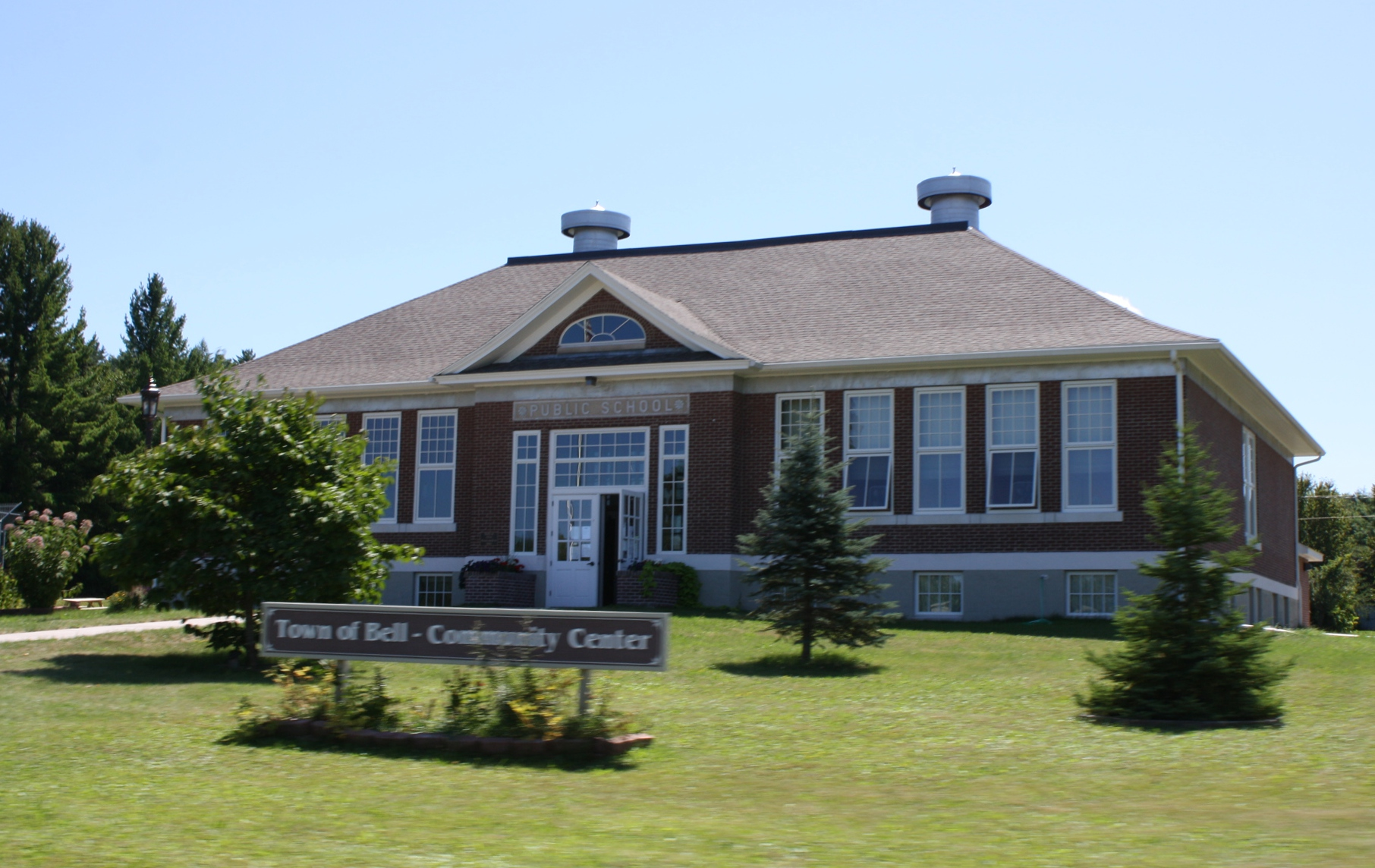
- Community center

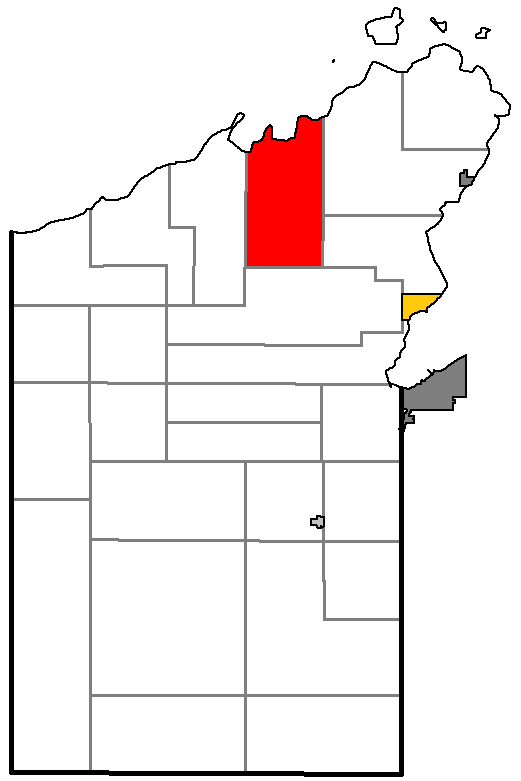
- Location of Bell, within Bayfield County
- Coordinates: 46°48′10″N 91°6′34″W
- Country: United States
- State: Wisconsin
- County: Bayfield

Area
  - Total: 60.5 sq mi (156.6 km^{2})
  - Land: 59.7 sq mi (154.6 km^{2})
  - Water: 0.77 sq mi (2.0 km^{2})
- Elevation: 1,112 ft (339 m)

Population (2020)
  - Total: 355
  - Density: 5.95/sq mi (2.30/km^{2})
- Time zone: UTC-6 (Central (CST))
  - Summer (DST): UTC-5 (CDT)
- Area codes: 715 & 534
- FIPS code: 55-06200
- GNIS feature ID: 1582783
- Website: https://bellwi.gov/

Bell is a town in Bayfield County, Wisconsin, United States. The population was 355 at the 2020 census, up from 263 at the 2010 census. The unincorporated community of Cornucopia is located within the town.

Wisconsin Highway 13 and County Highway C are the main routes in the community.

== Geography ==
According to the United States Census Bureau, the town has a total area of 60.5 square miles (156.6 km^{2}), of which 59.7 square miles (154.6 km^{2}) is land and 0.77 square miles (2.0 km^{2}), or 1.25%, is water.

== Demographics ==
At the 2000 census there were 230 people in 115 households, including 77 families, in the town. The population density was 3.9 people per square mile (1.5/km^{2}). There were 412 housing units at an average density of 6.9 per square mile (2.7/km^{2}). The racial makeup of the town was 93.91% White, 4.35% Native American, and 1.74% from two or more races. Of the 115 households 20.9% had children under the age of 18 living with them, 56.5% were married couples living together, 6.1% had a female householder with no husband present, and 33.0% were non-families. 29.6% of households were one person and 11.3% were one person aged 65 or older. The average household size was 2.00 and the average family size was 2.42.

The age distribution was 14.8% under the age of 18, 3.0% from 18 to 24, 25.2% from 25 to 44, 34.8% from 45 to 64, and 22.2% 65 or older. The median age was 50 years. For every 100 females, there were 105.4 males. For every 100 females age 18 and over, there were 104.2 males.

The median household income was $29,688 and the median family income was $41,000. Males had a median income of $33,750 versus $22,083 for females. The per capita income for the town was $18,683. About 13.6% of families and 17.1% of the population were below the poverty line, including 14.3% of those under the age of eighteen and 18.6% of those sixty five or over.
