= Red Cliff Band of Lake Superior Chippewa =

Band of Ojibwe Native Americans based in Wisconsin, United States

Coordinates: 46°56′49″N 90°52′20″W

Red Cliff Band Band of Lake Superior Chippewa
Gaa-Miskwaabikaang
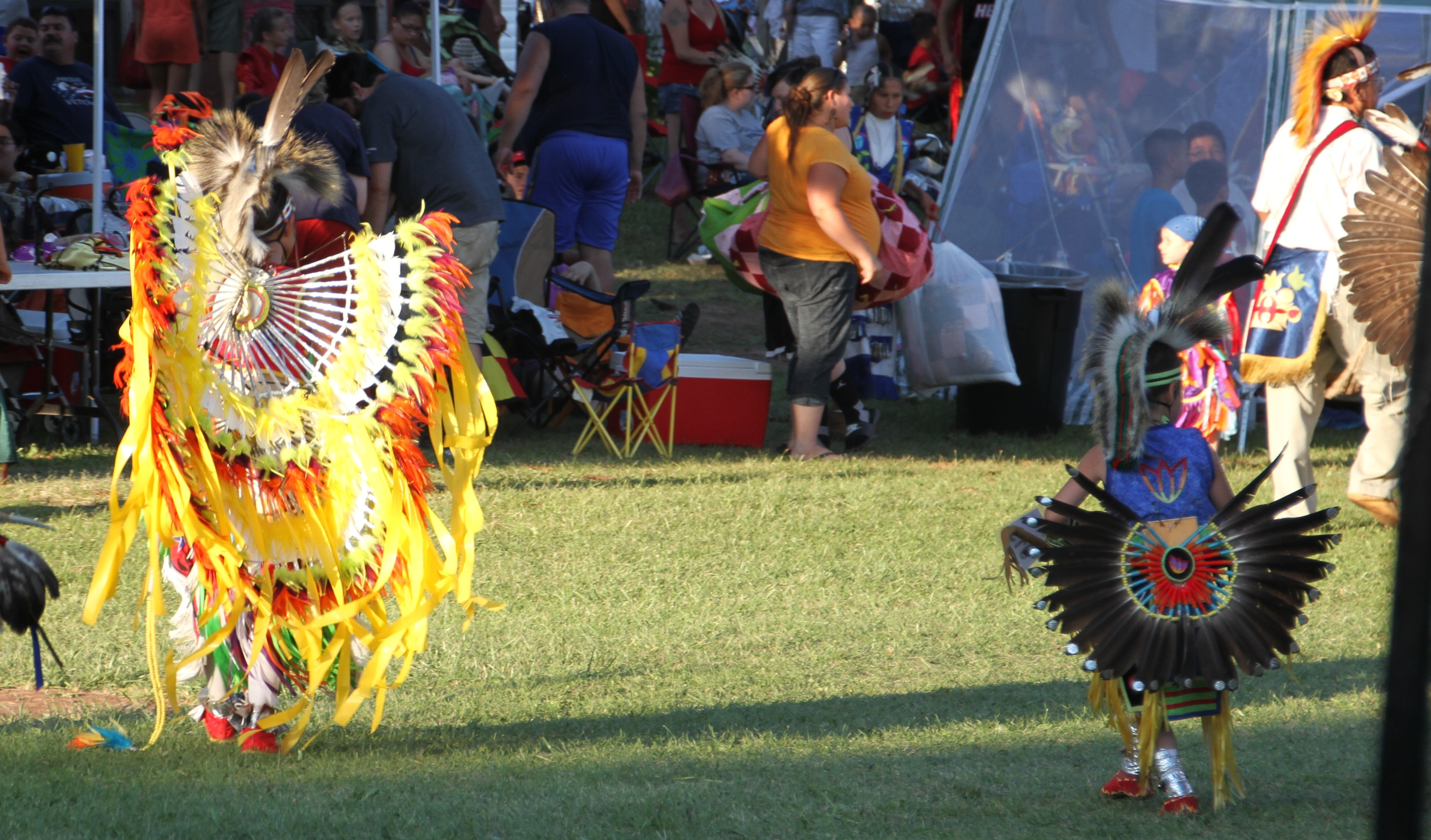
- Red Cliff members in a powwow

Total population
- 5,312 (2010)

Regions with significant populations
- United States (Wisconsin)

Languages
- English, Ojibwe

Related ethnic groups
- other Ojibwe people

Red Cliff Band of Lake Superior Chippewa (Ojibwe: Gaa-Miskwaabikaang) is a band of Ojibwe Native Americans. The Red Cliff Band is located on the Red Cliff Indian Reservation, on Lake Superior in Bayfield County, Wisconsin. Red Cliff, Wisconsin, is the administrative center. Red Cliff is notable for being the band closest to the spiritual center of the Ojibwe nation, Madeline Island. As of November 2010, there were 5,312 enrolled members, with about half living on the reservation and the rest living in the city of Bayfield or the Belanger Settlement.

== History ==
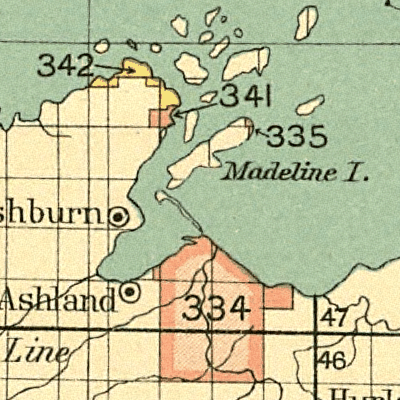
1899 map of Chippewa reservations, Red Cliff is shown as #342

The Red Cliff Band is one of the successors of the Lake Superior Chippewa the group of Ojibwe that moved west along the south shore of Lake Superior from Sault Ste. Marie. According to tradition, the Ojibwe came from the Atlantic coast via several stopping places to Chequamegon Bay directed by the Great Spirit {Gichi Manidoo} to find the "food that grows on water" (wild rice). Madeline Island represented the final stopping place.

During the 17th century, French fur traders and Jesuits arrived on Madeline Island and set up a trading post at La Pointe with a Catholic mission. In the 18th century, the La Pointe Ojibwe spread throughout the mainland of what would become Wisconsin and Minnesota. The Ojibwe who remained in the vicinity of Madeline Island were referred to as the La Pointe Band.

After a disastrous 1850 attempt at removing the Lake Superior bands resulting in the Sandy Lake Tragedy, the US government agreed to setting up permanent reservations in Wisconsin with the Treaty of La Pointe (1854). At this point, the La Pointe band split with Roman Catholic members under the leadership of Chief Buffalo taking a reservation at Red Cliff, and those maintaining traditional Midewiwin beliefs settling at Bad River. The two bands, however, maintain close relations to this day.

During the early reservation period, most tribal members were forced to make their living working for white employers in nearby Bayfield, Wisconsin. The commercial fishing industry drew many of these workers.

At the turn of the 19th century, the Commission of Indian Affairs allowed lumbering companies to cut most of the timber on the reservation. Many tribal members found work in logging, but the tribe itself received few benefits from the financial profits.

== Revival ==
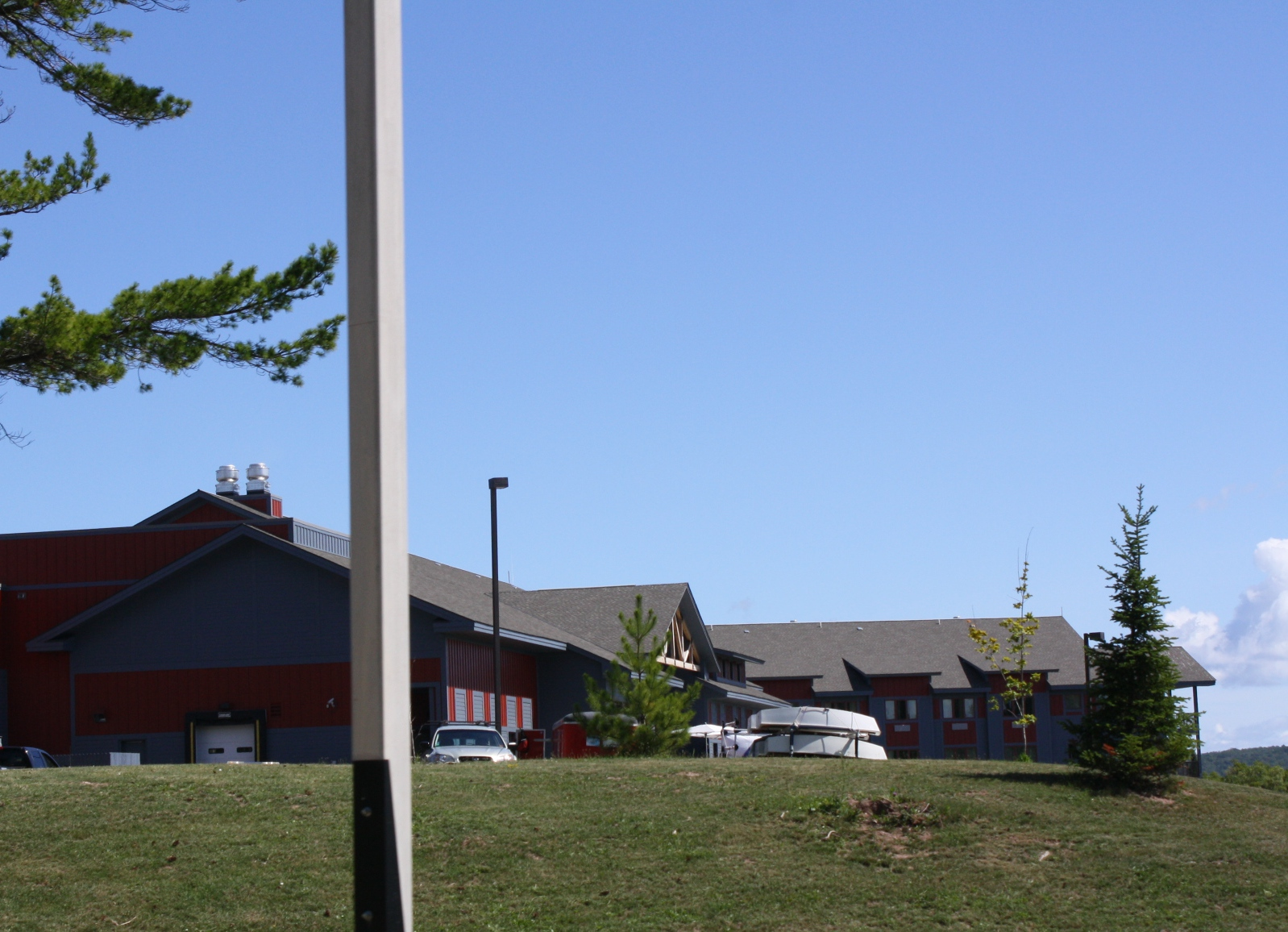
Legendary Waters Resort and Casino

During the 20th century, commercial fishing in Lake Superior sustained many Red Cliff families. Despite the fact that the Ojibwe had reserved the rights to hunt, fish, and gather in treaties signed in Wisconsin Supreme Court case Gurnoe vs. Wisconsin (1972), the court found in favor of a Red Cliff tribal member upholding that the tribe reserved the right to harvest reasonable amounts of fish. This was an important precedent for the Voigt decision.

During the Wisconsin Walleye War (1987–1991), Red Cliff was not a site of violence in the way other Lake Superior bands were. However, Red Cliff tribal members began exercising treaty rights, and member Walter Bresette emerged as a major leader of the treaty-rights movement.

== Today ==
Today, Red Cliff is the site of a fish hatchery run by the Red Cliff Band of Lake Superior Chippewa. Red Cliff also runs Legendary Waters Resort and Casino, which sits on the shore of Lake Superior. The band has also taken control of the reservation's Head Start program, and offers an Ojibwe language immersion program for young children. Tribal member Rabbett Strickland is a highly prolific contemporary artist. Frank Anakwad Montano, a Red Cliff tribal member is an internationally known musician. He is fluent in the making and playing of Ojibwe flutes. He has also mastered the guitar over the years, starting out in Milwaukee, Wisconsin, and continuing when he moved back to the Reservation in the 1970s.

== Reservation ==
Location of the Red Cliff Indian Reservation

The Red Cliff Reservation is located on the shore of Lake Superior in the Town of Russell and the Town of Bayfield, north and northwest of the city of Bayfield, Wisconsin. The band's administrative headquarters are in Red Cliff. According to the U.S. Census Bureau, the reservation had a total area of 22.08 square miles (57.2 km^{2}) in 2020. The band also administered 0.83 square miles (2.1 km^{2}) of off-reservation trust land. The combined reservation and off-reservation trust land have a total area of 22.91 square miles (59.35 km^{2}), of which 22.78 square miles (59.0 km^{2}) is land and 0.14 square miles (0.35 km^{2}) is water.

As of the census of 2020, the combined population of Red Cliff Reservation and Off-Reservation Trust Land was 1,403. The population density was 61.6 inhabitants per square mile (23.8/km^{2}). There were 610 housing units at an average density of 26.8 per square mile (10.3/km^{2}). The racial makeup of the reservation and off-reservation trust land was 82.8% Native American, 11.4% White, 0.1% Black or African American, 0.1% Asian, 0.3% from other races, and 5.3% from two or more races. Ethnically, the population was 5.4% Hispanic or Latino of any race.

According to the American Community Survey estimates for 2016-2020, the median income for a household (including the reservation and off-reservation trust land) was $40,000, and the median income for a family was $41,667. Male full-time workers had a median income of $32,841 versus $34,643 for female workers. The per capita income was $15,950. About 32.5% of families and 34.9% of the population were below the poverty line, including 45.0% of those under age 18 and 11.8% of those age 65 or over. Of the population age 25 and over, 87.3% were high school graduates or higher and 6.2% had a bachelor's degree or higher.

=== Frog Bay Tribal National Park ===
The Red Cliff Band established the Frog Bay Tribal National Park on the reservation in 2012. It is the first tribal national park open to the public in the United States. The park protects about 175 acres (0.71 km^{2}) of boreal forest, wetland, and undeveloped Lake Superior coastline.

== Notable members ==
- Kechewaishke (Chief Buffalo)
- Walter Bresette, environmental and Native American rights activist
