= Crandon mine =

Proposed mine for northeastern Wisconsin

Crandon mine was a mine proposed for northeastern Wisconsin, USA. It was to be situated near the town of Crandon and the Mole Lake Ojibwe Reservation in Forest County. The mine was the center of a multi-decade political and regulatory battle between environmentalists, American Indian tribes, sportfishing groups, and the State of Wisconsin and several large mining corporations. The purchase of the mine site in 2003 by the Sokaogon Ojibwe and Forest County Potawatomi marked a major victory for the tribes and environmental activists, and raised questions about the future of mining, economics, and tribal power in Wisconsin.

== Background ==
The Crandon site was the location of one of several deposits of metallic sulfide ore found in northern Wisconsin during the 1970s, and its estimated 60 million tons of copper, zinc and other metallic sulfides was thought to hold the highest potential for profit. Three sites in all were proposed for digging. From the outset, environmental groups opposed the process of extracting metals from the sulfide ore, which if not properly handled may create sulfuric acid as a waste product. Each of the three sites was sufficiently close to an Ojibwe reservation to attract tribal opposition as well.

As news of the proposed mine spread, many environmental groups such as the Sierra Club sprang into action. Other groups formed in opposition to the mine, such as Protectors of the Wolf River (POW'R), and eventually worked with Al Gedicks on coordinating environmentalist efforts. Among their fears was the potential for acid mine drainage that results from sulfides mixing with air or water. Sulfide rock can produce high levels of poisonous heavy metals such as mercury, lead, zinc, arsenic, copper, and cadmium. This process is the single largest cause of negative environmental impact resulting from mining. This was of particular concern because the proposed mining area was in extremely close proximity to the Wolf River. Furthermore, environmentalists were not pleased about the discharge into that river, which would contain heavy metals. The estimate of the density of these heavy metals varied range depending on who made the estimation. Lastly, there was a concern about the amount of waste that the mine would create and how it would be contained from adversely affecting the natural world. Over its lifetime of production, the mine would generate about 44 million tons of waste. Half would be rocky "coarse tailings", which would be dumped to fill the mine shafts, while the other half would be powdery "fine tailings", which would be dumped into a waste pond equivalent to the size of 340 football fields with a plastic liner separating the tailings from the environment.

Proposals by Kennecott Minerals Company to mine a metal sulfide deposit near Ladysmith, Wisconsin were initially rejected by the Wisconsin Department of Natural Resources. However, after Kennecott's buyout by Rio Tinto Zinc, and the governorship of the pro-business Tommy Thompson, the mine was allowed to open in face of the opposition, and operated from 1993 to 1997. The site has since been reclaimed.

A similar proposal by the Canadian company Noranda to mine a deposit in Oneida County failed in part because of heavy opposition by the Lac du Flambeau Ojibwe.

These smaller battles set the stage and prepared both sides in the larger fight over the Crandon proposal.

== Potential opposition ==
Although the mine was known by the name of the nearby town of Crandon, the site lay adjacent to the Mole Lake reservation of the Sokaogon Ojibwe. The Ojibwe feared the consequences that runoff from the sulfide mine could have on the reservation's Rice Lake, a site of immense cultural and historical importance to the band. Five miles east, the Forest County Potawatomi had similar fears that the wind would carry air pollution from the mine to their reservation. Furthermore, its location on a tributary of the Wolf River meant that any liquid waste escaping the mine threatened one of the National Wild and Scenic Rivers in the state. In addition to non-Indian residents all along the bank, the Menominee and Mohican (Stockbridge-Munsee) reservations lay downstream and brought more concerns of indigenous people to the table.

== History ==
The first proposal to mine the Crandon site was put forth by Exxon in the late 1970s. In the summer of 1975, they had conducted test drilling of 25 electro-magnetic areas, which confirmed that there was indeed a mineral deposit. The Mole Lake community opposed it from the start, which put them at odds with many in nearby towns who hoped that mining jobs would provide steady employment for the depressed region. The Sierra Club, the Wisconsin Resources Protection Council, a non-profit environmental group dedicated to providing information about large scale metallic sulfide mining, and the Mining Impact Coalition, a grassroots organization dedicated to protecting and preserving natural and cultural communities, were among the many groups in opposition to the mine. The proposed mine would be near the headwaters of the Wolf River and environmentalists claimed that there was a high potential for damage to the water quality, as well as the living things that reside in the river. In addition to the negative environmental effects on the Wolf River, the Sokaogon Chippewa, as well as the Menominee, who resided directly downstream from the proposed mine, were facing the potential for their food sources to be contaminated. Already facing an increased threat of illness and health problems because of a cultural diet of fish, deer, and other wildlife already contaminated by industrial pollutants, they faced the risk of having their lands and everything living on them further tainted. As fishing groups became aware of this issue and feared the degradation of their quarry in world-class trout fishing waters, they too joined in opposition of the mine. With an alliance of opposition created, a strong force was rendered. Exxon, after working in the state since 1975 performing environmental assessments and working to be granted a mining permit, withdrew from the permit process in 1986 stating that it was due to "depressed metal prices". Strong local opposition may have also been a factor. By the time they returned in 1994, the alliance of sport fisherman, environmentalists, and Native Americans were waiting in opposition.

In the late 1980s and 1990s, clashes over spearfishing and the experience of other mining conflicts resulted in a broad-based coalition prepared to use treaty rights to stop the mine at any cost. The Ojibwe joined with the Potawatomi, Menominee, and Mohican to lobby against the mine in the capital at Madison and in the courts. In doing so, they secured numerous protective designations for the Wolf, which made the standards for pollution harsher on a mine. In addition, the spearing conflict and an educational campaign undertaken by the four tribes to raise awareness of Native issues, had the effect of showing white residents the value of the treaty rights possessed by the Indians. As a result, the tribes and Wolf River locals formed a much more unified opposition than had been seen in the other conflicts. Coming off a 1996 victory in the Bad River Train Blockade, this coalition's greatest success came when Governor Thompson was forced by political pressure to sign a mining moratorium into state law on Earth Day 1998. The bill had gone through the assembly 77 days earlier when Representatives voted 91–6 in favor of the bill. The moratorium mandated that mining companies prove similar mines had existed safely before the state would grant permits.

== Conclusion ==
In a mid-1990s lawsuit finally decided by the U.S. Supreme Court in 2002, the right of Indian nations to have "Treatment as a State" status on applicable issues was interpreted to apply to setting and enforcing clean air and water standards. This meant the tribes could set their own, potentially far more restrictive limits than those of the state Department of Natural Resources, essentially meaning a potential Crandon mine would have to be completely free of pollution. This was the end of the economic viability of the project, and on October 28, 2003, the Mole Lake Ojibwe and Forest County Potawatomi used $16.5 million worth of casino revenue to purchase the mine site and Nicolet Minerals Inc., its latest owner. Neither tribe has plans to develop the site in the foreseeable future. The death of the Crandon project disappointed many in the area who had hoped it would bring an economic boost to the depressed region, instead of what a former Crandon project manager referred to as the "end of mining in the state". Mining publications consistently rank the anti-mining climate in Wisconsin as the most hostile to the industry.

== See also ==
- Back Forty Mine
- Bad River Train Blockade

== Notes ==
- Bergquist, Lee. 2002. "Decision puts water quality in tribe's hands; Sokaogon can set standard near mine." Milwaukee Journal Sentinel, 6/4/2002, 1A.
- Gedicks, Al. 1993. The New Resource Wars: Native and Environmental Struggles Against Multinational Corporations. Boston: South End Press.
- Grossman, Zoltan C.. 2017. Unlikely Alliances: Native Nations and White Communities Join to Defend Rural Lands. Seattle: University of Washington Press / Indigenous Confluences.
- Imrie, Robert. 2003. "Former mining project manager says Crandon mine is dead." Associated Press, 8/29/2003. Viewed 7/30/04 on database LexisNexis.
- Loew, Patty. 2001. Indian Nations of Wisconsin: Histories of Endurance and Renewal." Madison: Wisconsin Historical Society Press.
- Meersman, Tom. 1996. "A conflict of environment and economics; Chemical shipments spur safety concerns and a tribal protest." Star Tribune (Minneapolis, MN), 8/3/1996, 3B.
- Midwest Treaty Network. 2003. "International Mining Journals Assess Wisconsin Opposition." Web site viewed on July 30, 2004.
- Rinard, Amy and Meg Jones. 2003. "Tribes' purchase ends Crandon mine tussle; Mining company says 'hostile political climate' doomed project." Milwaukee Journal Sentinel, 10/29/2003, 1A.
- Seely, Ron. 2003. "Tribes Will Pay $16.5 million for Mine Site: The Sokaogon Mole Lake Chippewa and Forest County Potawatomi are Elated by the Deal." Wisconsin State Journal, 10/29/2003, A1.
