= Red Cliff, Wisconsin =

- Unincorporated community
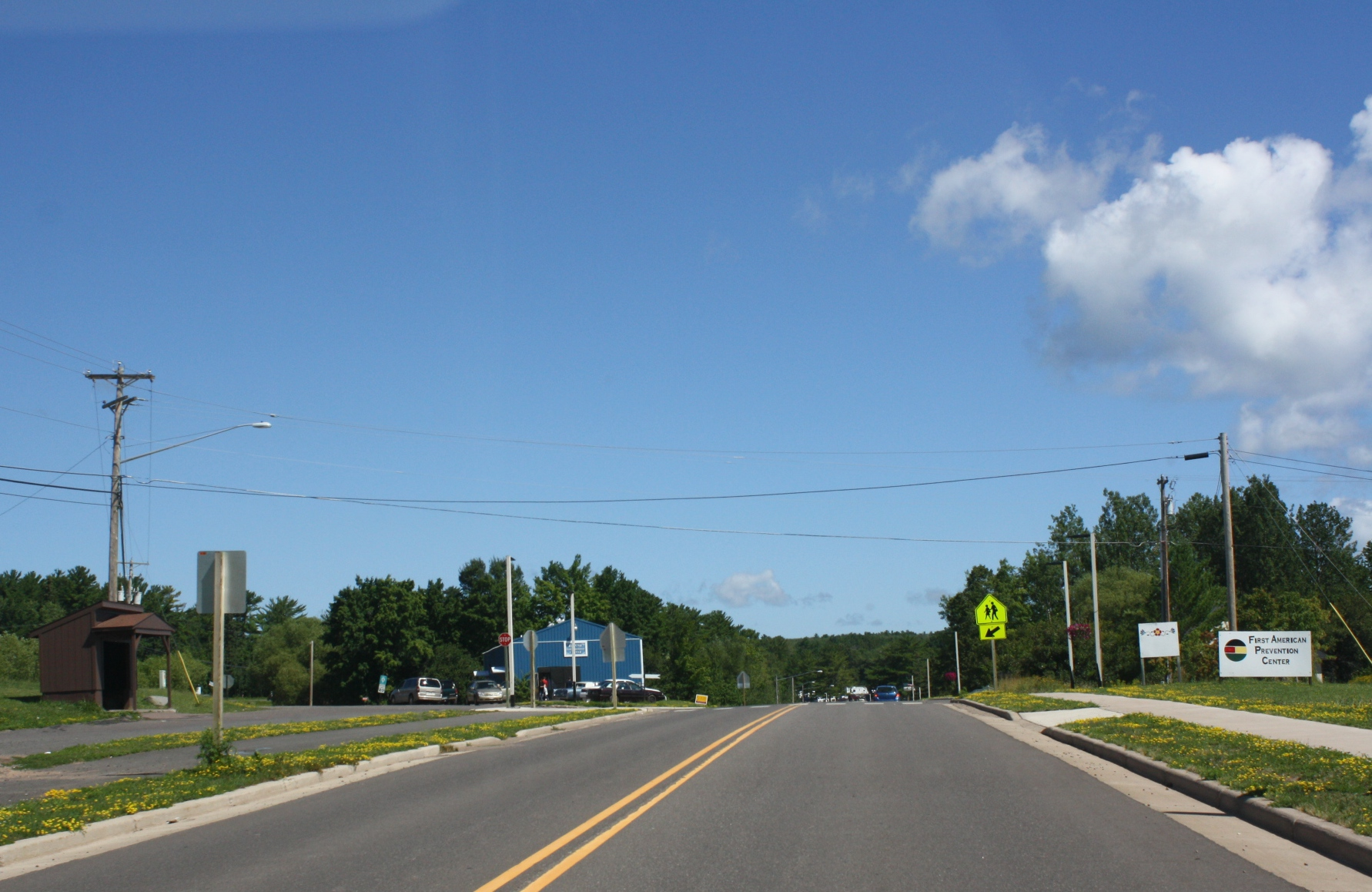
- Downtown Red Cliff

- Location within Wisconsin Location within the United States
- Coordinates: 46°51′20″N 90°47′17″W
- Country: United States
- State: Wisconsin
- County: Bayfield
- Elevation: 640 ft (200 m)
- Time zone: UTC-6 (Central (CST))
  - Summer (DST): UTC-5 (CDT)
- Area codes: 715 and 534
- GNIS feature ID: 1572135

Red Cliff, also known as Gaa-Miskwaabikaang, is a Tribal Nation in the town of Russell, Bayfield County, Wisconsin, United States. Red Cliff is the administrative center of the Red Cliff Band of Lake Superior Chippewa. The reservation population is 1,353, primarily Native American.

== The Red Cliff Reservation ==
The Red Cliff Reservation was created through a series of treaties between the U.S. Government and the Red Cliff Band of Lake Superior Chippewa Indians (Red Cliff Band), the most recent being the treaty of 1854. The reservation is approximately one mile (1.6 km) wide and 14 miles (23 km) long, located at the top of the Bayfield Peninsula, on the shores of Lake Superior in northern Wisconsin.

The community of Red Cliff, the location of tribal offices and businesses, is three miles (4.8 km) north of the city of Bayfield, a popular tourist community adjacent to the Apostle Islands National Lakeshore.

Frog Bay Tribal National Park (FBTNP) is located in Red Cliff. It is the first Tribal National Park in the United States. The original 89-acre parcel of former Red Cliff Reservation land was successfully reacquired in 2012 and a second, 86-acre private parcel was acquired in 2017. This 175-acre area comprises FBTNP and permanently protects a large tract of at-risk boreal forest, the lower estuary and mouth of Frog Creek, and restored former reservation lands back to tribal ownership.

== Transportation ==
Wisconsin Highway 13 serves as a main route in the community.

Bus service is provided by Miskwaabekong Transit in partnership with Bay Area Rural Transit.

== Images ==
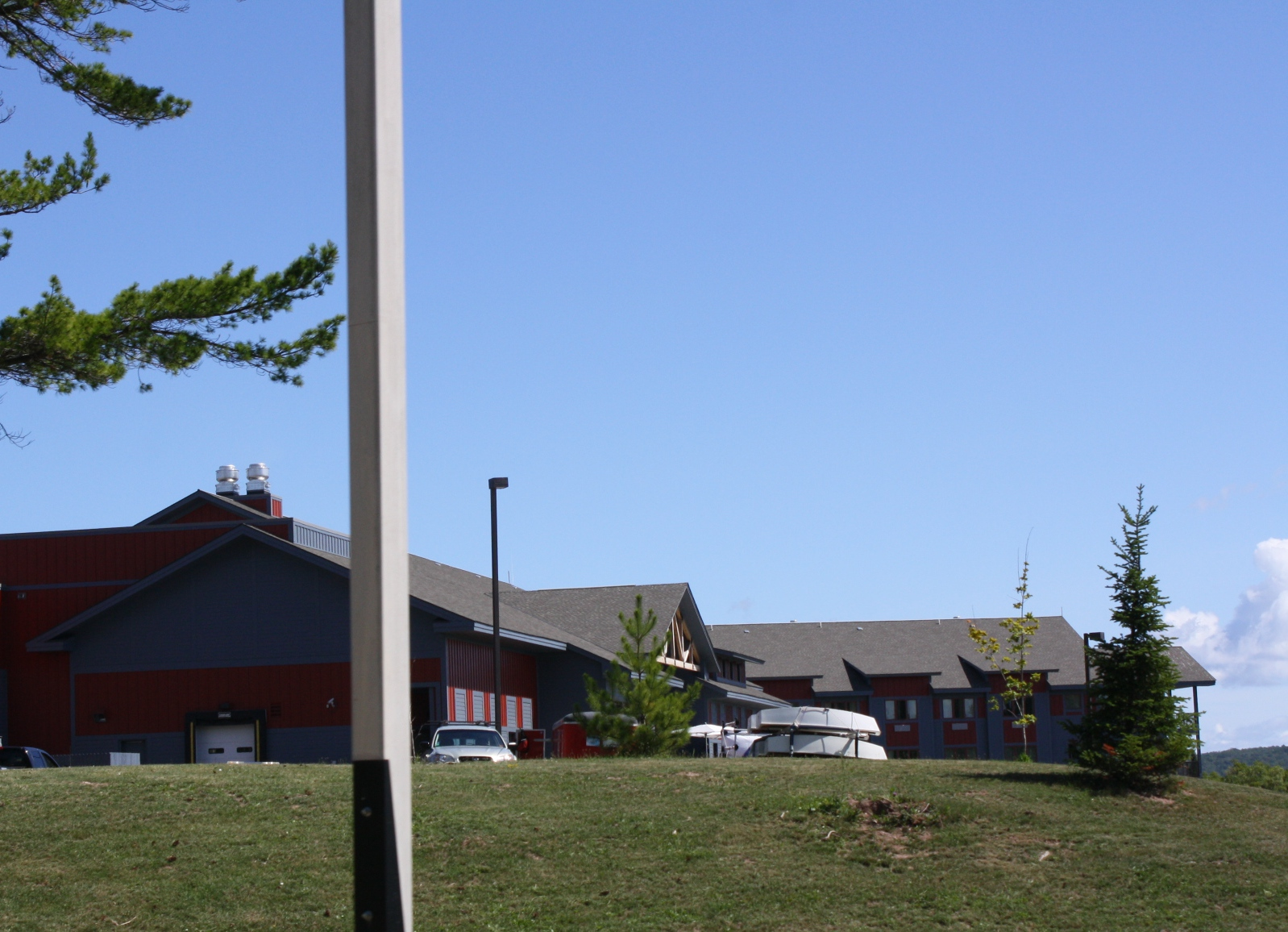
Legendary Waters Resort and Casino
